= Borsec =

Borsec Borszék
- Town
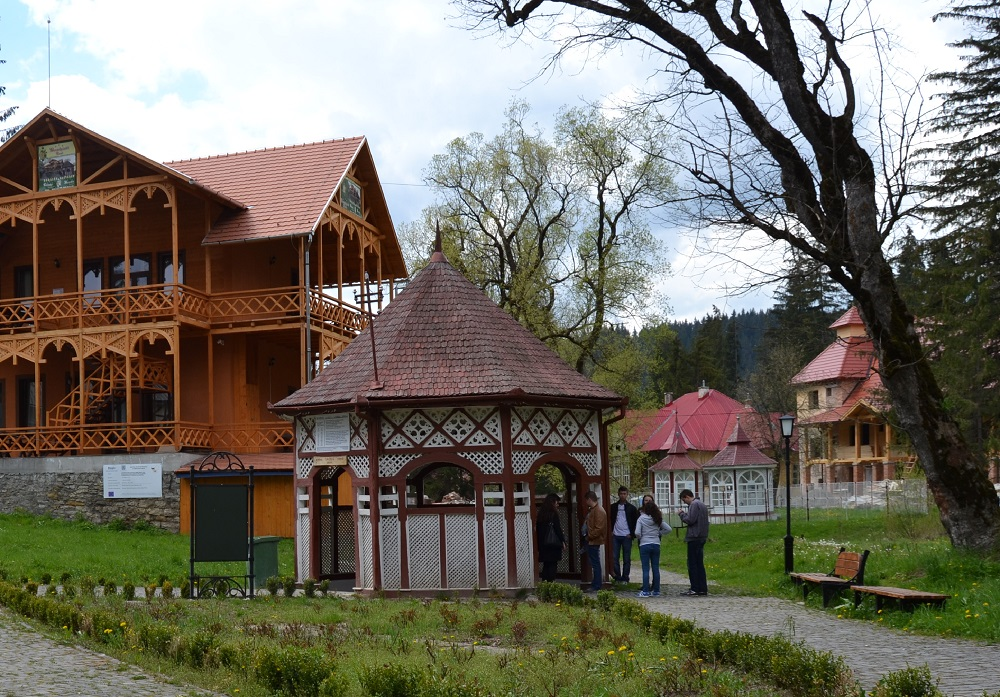

- Coat of arms

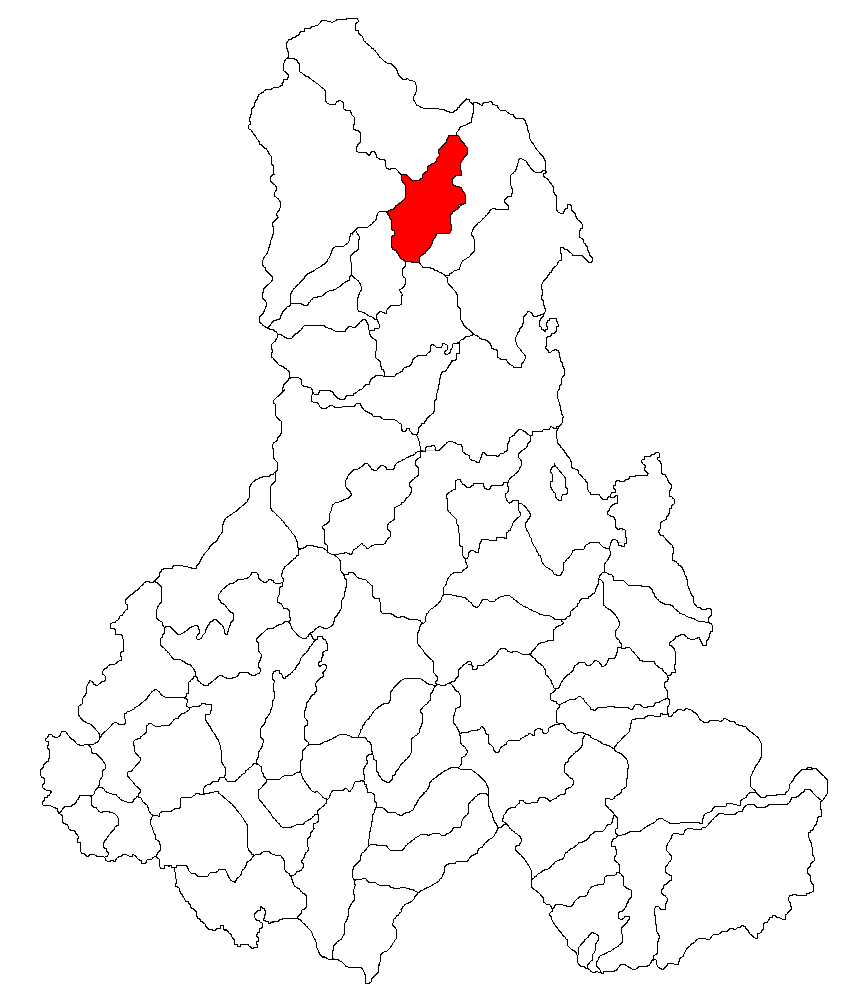
- Location in Harghita County

- Location in Romania
- Coordinates: 46°58′0″N 25°34′12″E
- Country: Romania
- County: Harghita

Government
  - Mayor (2024–2028): József Mik (UDMR)
- Area: 96 km^{2} (37 sq mi)
- Elevation: 900 m (3,000 ft)
- Population (2021-12-01): 2,391
  - Density: 25/km^{2} (65/sq mi)
- Time zone: UTC+02:00 (EET)
  - Summer (DST): UTC+03:00 (EEST)
- Postal code: 535300
- Area code: (+40) 02 66
- Vehicle reg.: HR
- Website: www.borsec.ro

Borsec (Hungarian: Borszék, pronounced [ˈborseːk]) is a town in Harghita County, Transylvania, Romania. The town and the surrounding areas are well known for their spas and mineral waters. It has a population of 2,585, with a majority of ethnic Hungarians (more specifically Szeklers).

== History ==
The town was historically part of the Székely Land area of Transylvania. Administratively, it belonged to Csíkszék until the administrative reform of Transylvania in 1876, when it fell within the Csík County in Austria-Hungary. After the Hungarian–Romanian War of 1919 and the Treaty of Trianon of 1920, it became part of the Kingdom of Romania and fell within Ciuc County during the interwar period. In 1940, the Second Vienna Award granted Northern Transylvania to Hungary and the settlement was held by Hungary until October 1944. After Soviet occupation, the Romanian administration returned in March 1945. Between 1952 and 1960, the town fell within the Magyar Autonomous Region, between 1960 and 1968 the Mureș-Magyar Autonomous Region.

== Geography ==
Borsec, a resort chiefly known for its mineral water and favourable climate, is situated in the intracarpatic depression of the same name, at an altitude of 900 m (3,000 ft). The Borsec Depression has an oval shape and is northeast oriented, being separated from the hilltop of the Rotunda Chair in two subunits. The locality is composed of two areas that correspond geographically to the two small depression areas that join: The Upper Borsec (Borsec de Sus) and The Lower Borsec (Borsec de Jos). The latter is southwest along national road DN15 at its junction with county road DJ128 Borsec-Ditrău, and Borsec de Sus (or the resort itself) is located on the plateau located northeast of the primary settlement, which is at higher altitude on average with 80–100 m. In the west, at a short distance, one can reach Toplița, the Pass of Creangă and to the east the Bistricioara valley. The Borsec depression is located at a higher altitude to that of Giurgeu but lower than that of Bilbor. Within the resort there are alleys and tourist trails, most of which are located in the outskirts of the resort, especially for visiting the nature monuments from the reservation of the Scaunul Rotund and Făget (Bükkhavas). They have the necessary arrangements to perform the field treatment under appropriate conditions, including tourist markings.

== Mineral water springs – the main resource of Borsec ==
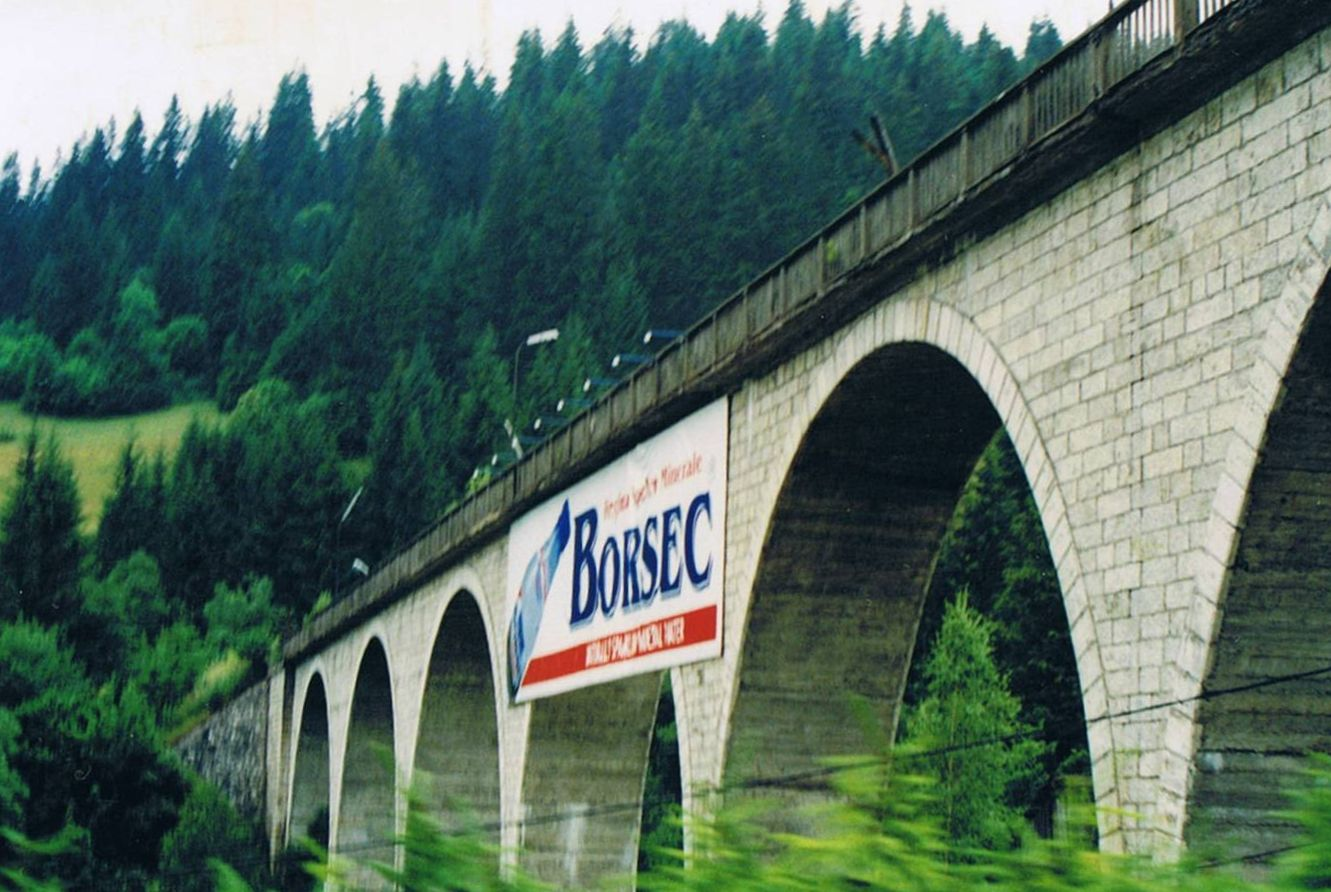
Viaduct support of mineral water supply for the bottling plant

Mineral water springs are numerous, with a close and stable chemical composition over time, with variable but sufficient flows to be economically used and are currently the main economic engine of the resort. The mineralization characters fall into the group of bicarbonate, calcium, magnesium, carbonate and hypotonic mixed mineral waters. The springs of the Borsec Depression occur in two groups - the northern one of greater importance - the springs line having originating from dolomitic crystalline limestone, sources characterized by the accumulation of water in the cracks and the karstic voids (springs 1, 2, 3, 5, 6); and the southern group - the line of springs cantonated in calcareous tuff with a restricted circulation of water through cracks and areas of alteration (springs 10, 11, 15). The most important springs qualitative and as flow of the resort are the springs 1 and 2. Both are captured, their carbonated water - bicarbonated being used for bottling, external and internal cures.

== Indications of treatment (hydromineral, peloid, balneoclimatic) ==
It is not advisable to use mineral water in the form of a cleanse without medical indication. In the internal cure (through the direct consumption of mineral water), the springs in Borsec are indicated:

- In diseases of the digestive tract and the adjacent glands: chronic hypo- or normoacid gastritis, dyspepsia, mild enteritis, enterocolitis, fermentation colitis.
- In chronic hepatitis, posthepatitis states, biliary disorders, sequelae after on the bile ducts surgery.
- In nutrition diseases: compensated and balanced diabetes mellitus type 2, gout and uterine diathesis.
- Endocrine diseases: mild hyperthyroid.
- In diseases of the kidneys and urinary tract: chronic nephritis without kidney failure, pyelonephritis, chronic cystitis, acid urinary lithiasis, sequelae after operations on the urinary tract.

In external treatment (through bathing) the Borsec mineral waters can be used in:

- cardiovascular diseases: chronic myocarditis - no cardiac failure phenomena; valvulopathies - compensated; coronary insufficiency - with mild access, essential hypertension - in the early stages, obliterating arteriopathies - in early stages, sequelae after thrombophlebitis.

In the Upper Borsec in the wet areas formed on a clayey layer located on the right side of the Usturoi brook there is a peat (in some parts the thickness exceeds 10 m). The chemical composition gives it qualities of therapeutic sludge that makes it possible to use it in rheumatic diseases. Unfortunately, nowadays the Medical Recovery activity is stopped as a result of the closure of the Treatment Base.

== Name ==
Its name is derived from Hungarian "borvizszék" meaning "Seat of Mineral Water".

== Tourism ==
Borsec owes its fame to its mineral waters, known for their curing properties. Natural cures (the healing properties of the microclimate, surrounding air, soil and water) and physiotherapeutic properties are reputedly able to improve nutrition and heal a host of metabolic disorders.

One famous visitor to Borsec was Moldavian writer Vasile Alecsandri, who wrote the following in 1845: "at Borsec they all are brothers, if not in Jesus then in mineral water [...] one of the most important merits of Borsec is that it gives people human feelings!"

Nearby locations include the monasteries of Moldavia (Neamț, Secu, Văratec, Agapia, Durău, Sihăstria), the Lázár Castle, Lacul Roșu, the Bicaz Gorge, Lake Bicaz, the Durău resort, the Praid salt mine, Sovata, and the ceramics centre of Corund.

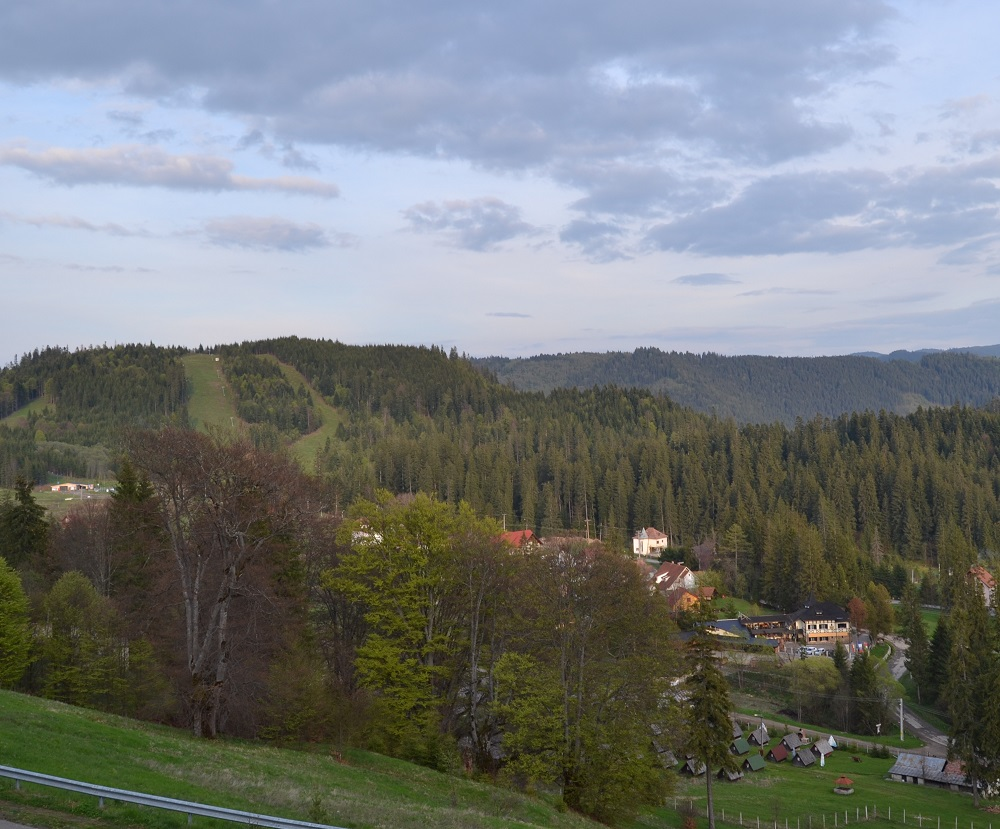
Borsec ski slope in spring.

== Demographics ==
Historical population
Year	Pop.	±%
1956	2,318	—
1966	2,750	+18.6%
1977	2,999	+9.1%
1992	3,074	+2.5%
2002	2,864	−6.8%
2011	2,573	−10.2%
2021	2,391	−7.1%
Source: Census data

According to the 2002 census, the town's population was 2,864, of whom 2,240 (78.2%) ethnic Hungarians, 607 (21.2%) ethnic Romanians, and 0.6% others. The 2011 census revealed the population dropped by 10.2%, to 2,573, with an ethnic makeup as follows: 1,975 (76.8%) Hungarians, 584 (22.7%) Romanians, and 0.5% others. At the 2021 census, Borsec had a population of 2,391.

== Exports ==
"Borsec, Queen of Mineral Waters" (since 1806) is bottled there and exported to nations such as Hungary, Italy, Germany, France, United Kingdom, United States, Canada, Israel, South Africa, Sweden, Jordan, Greece, Lebanon, Emirates.
