= Gheorgheni =

Gheorgheni Gyergyószentmiklós
- Municipality
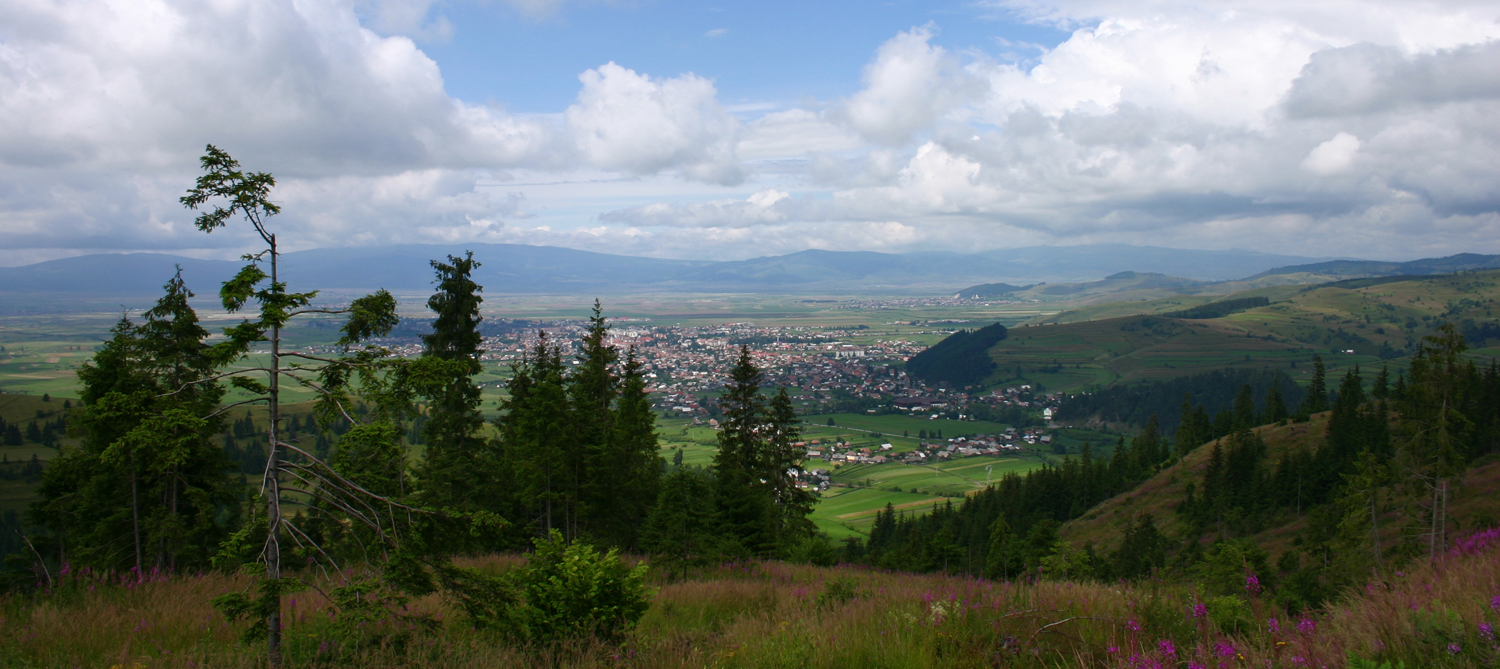

- Flag Coat of arms

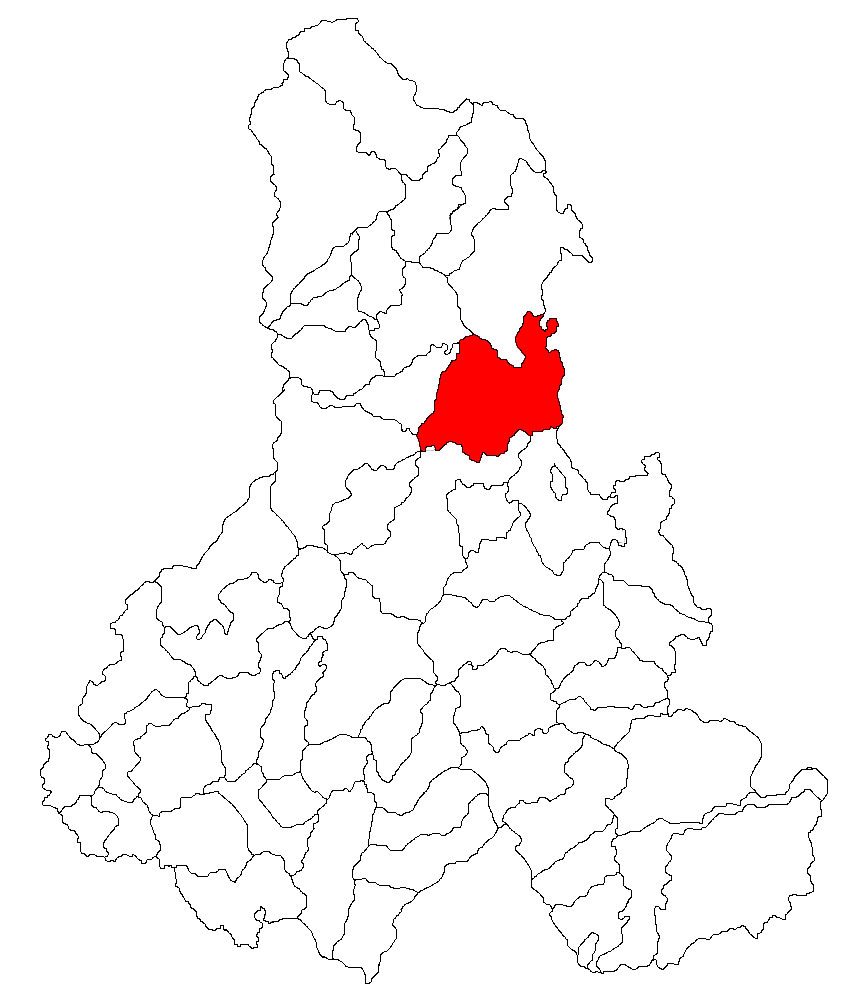
- Location in Harghita County

- Location in Romania
- Coordinates: 46°43′12″N 25°35′24″E
- Country: Romania
- County: Harghita

Government
  - Mayor (2024–2028): Zoltán Nagy
- Area: 90.17 km^{2} (34.81 sq mi)
- Elevation: 816 m (2,677 ft)
- Population (2021-12-01): 15,884
  - Density: 176.2/km^{2} (456.2/sq mi)
- Time zone: UTC+02:00 (EET)
  - Summer (DST): UTC+03:00 (EEST)
- Postal code: 535500
- Area code: (+40) 02 66
- Vehicle reg.: HR
- Website: www.gheorgheni.ro

Gheorgheni (Romanian pronunciation: [ɡe̯orˈɡenʲ]; Hungarian: Gyergyószentmiklós Hungarian pronunciation: [ˈɟɛrɟoːsɛntmikloːʃ]) is a city in Harghita County, Romania, with a population of 15,844, as of 2021. It lies in the Székely Land, an ethno-cultural region in eastern Transylvania. The city administers four villages: Covacipeter (Kovácspéter), Lacu Roșu (Gyilkostó), Vargatac (Vargatag), and Visafolio (Visszafolyó).

== Geography ==
The city is located in the northeastern part of Harghita County, 57 km (35 mi) north of the county seat, Miercurea Ciuc. It is situated in a mountainous region, at an altitude of 810 m (2,660 ft), and it is crossed east to west by the river Belcina, a right tributary of the river Mureș. Nearby are two natural sites, the Red Lake and Cheile Bicazului, a narrow canyon through the Eastern Carpathian Mountains forming the border with Neamț County.

== History ==
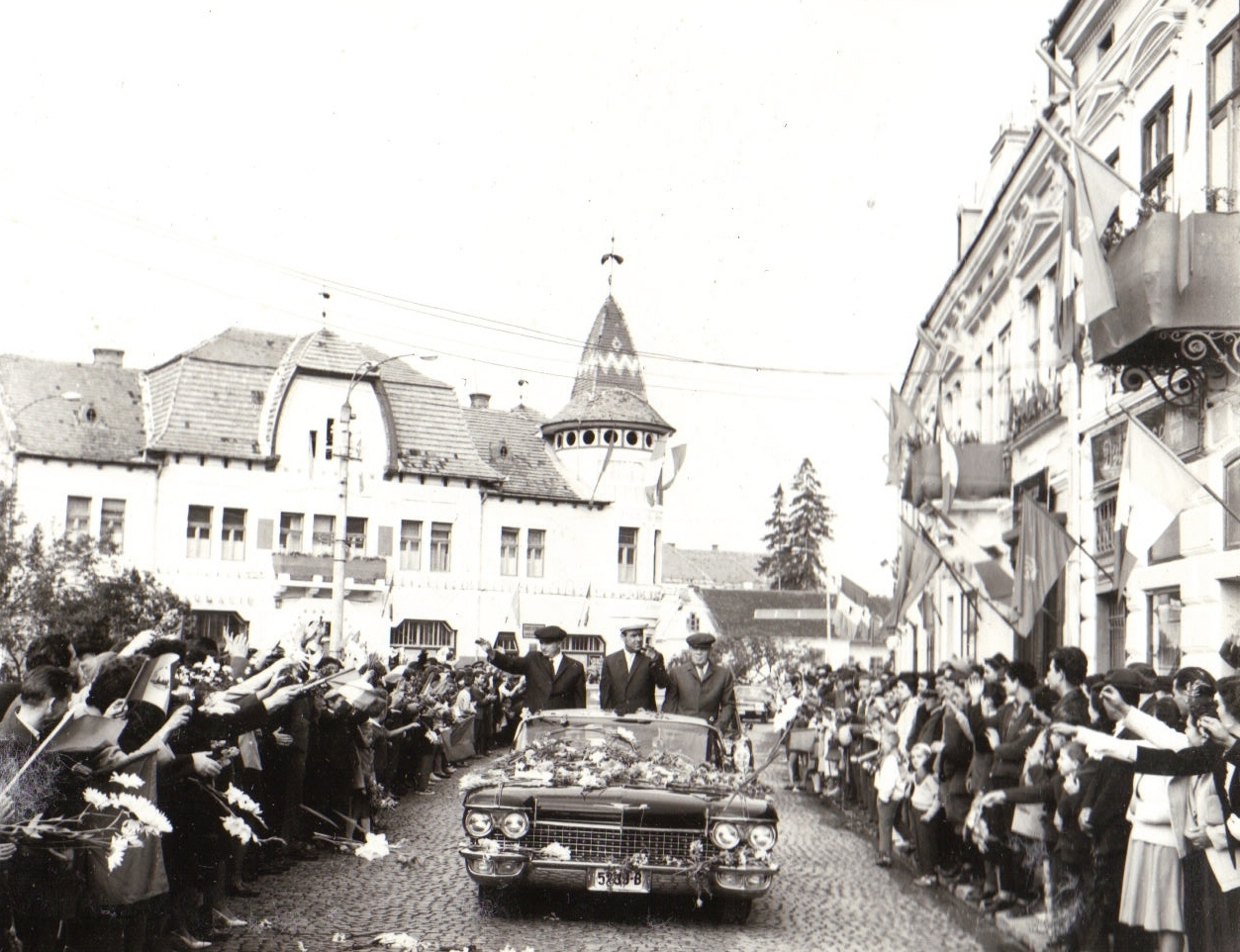
Visit of Communist Party leaders in 1966

Gheorgheni historically formed part of the Székely Land region of Transylvania. It was first mentioned in 1332. It belonged to the Kingdom of Hungary with several interruptions, the Eastern Hungarian Kingdom and the Principality of Transylvania, administratively the town belonged to Gyergyószék. Between 1867 and 1918 it fell within Csík County, in the Kingdom of Hungary.

In the aftermath of World War I, the Union of Transylvania with Romania was declared in December 1918. At the start of the Hungarian–Romanian War of 1918–1919, the town passed under Romanian administration. After the Treaty of Trianon of 1920, it became part of the Kingdom of Romania and fell within Ciuc County. In 1940, the Second Vienna Award granted Northern Transylvania to Hungary. Towards the end of World War II, Romanian and Soviet armies entered the town in October 1944. The territory of Northern Transylvania remained under Soviet military administration until March 9, 1945, after which it again became part of Romania. Between 1952 and 1960, Gheorgheni was part of the Magyar Autonomous Region, and between 1960 and 1968 part of the Mureș-Magyar Autonomous Region. After the administrative reform of 1968, the region was abolished, and since then, the city has been part of Harghita County.

== Demographics ==
Ethnic composition of Gheorgheni municipality
1. Hungarian (83.7%)
2. Romanian (9.05%)
3. Romi (2.37%)
4. Unknown (4.76%)
5. Another ethnicity (0.07%)
The confessional composition of the municipality of Gheorgheni
1. Roman Catholics (76.6%)
2. Orthodox (8.73%)
3. Reformed (5.81%)
4. Baptists (1.08%)
5. Unknown (5.04%)
6. Another religion (2.67%)

At the 2021 census, Gheorgheni had a population of 15,884. At the 2011 census, the city had a population of 17,705, of which 86.13% (15,250) were Hungarians and 1,988 (11.22%) Romanians.

Demographic movement according to the censuses:

For Armenian Catholics, see Ordinariate for Armenian Catholics of Romania.

== Politics ==
The town council has 19 members as follows:

Party	Seats	Current Council
Hungarian Civic Party (PCM/MPP)	10	
Democratic Alliance of Hungarians in Romania (UDMR/RMDSZ)	6	
Independent politician	2	
National Liberal Party (PNL)	1	

== Natives ==
- Zsolt Antal (born 1972), cross-country skier
- Mihály Fogarasy (1800–1882), bishop of the Catholic Church
- Réka Forika (born 1989), biathlete
- Ștefan Gal (born 1951), gymnast
- Mónika György (born 1982), cross-country skier
- Tímea Lőrincz (born 1992), cross-country skier
- Katalin Marosi (born 1979), tennis player
- Endre Molnár (born 1945), water polo player
- Pál Sajgó (1922–2016), cross-country skier and biathlete
- László Sólyom (born 1955), ice hockey player
- Virgil Șotropa (1867–1954), teacher, honorary member of the Romanian Academy
- Ágnes Szatmári (born 1987), tennis player
- Csaba Szekely (born 1990), ice hockey coach and goaltender
- László Tamás (born 1988), footballer
- Elemer-György Tanko (born 1968), cross-country skier
- Andrei Țepeș (born 1991), footballer

== Twinnings ==
- Békés, Hungary
- Erzsébetváros, Hungary
- Rákosmente, Hungary
- Cegléd, Hungary
- Eger, Hungary
- Kiskunmajsa, Hungary
- Siófok, Hungary
- Szigetszentmiklós, Hungary
- Bačka Topola, Serbia
- Alaverdi, Armenia
