= Bălan =

Town in Harghita County, Romania

Bălan Balánbánya
- Town
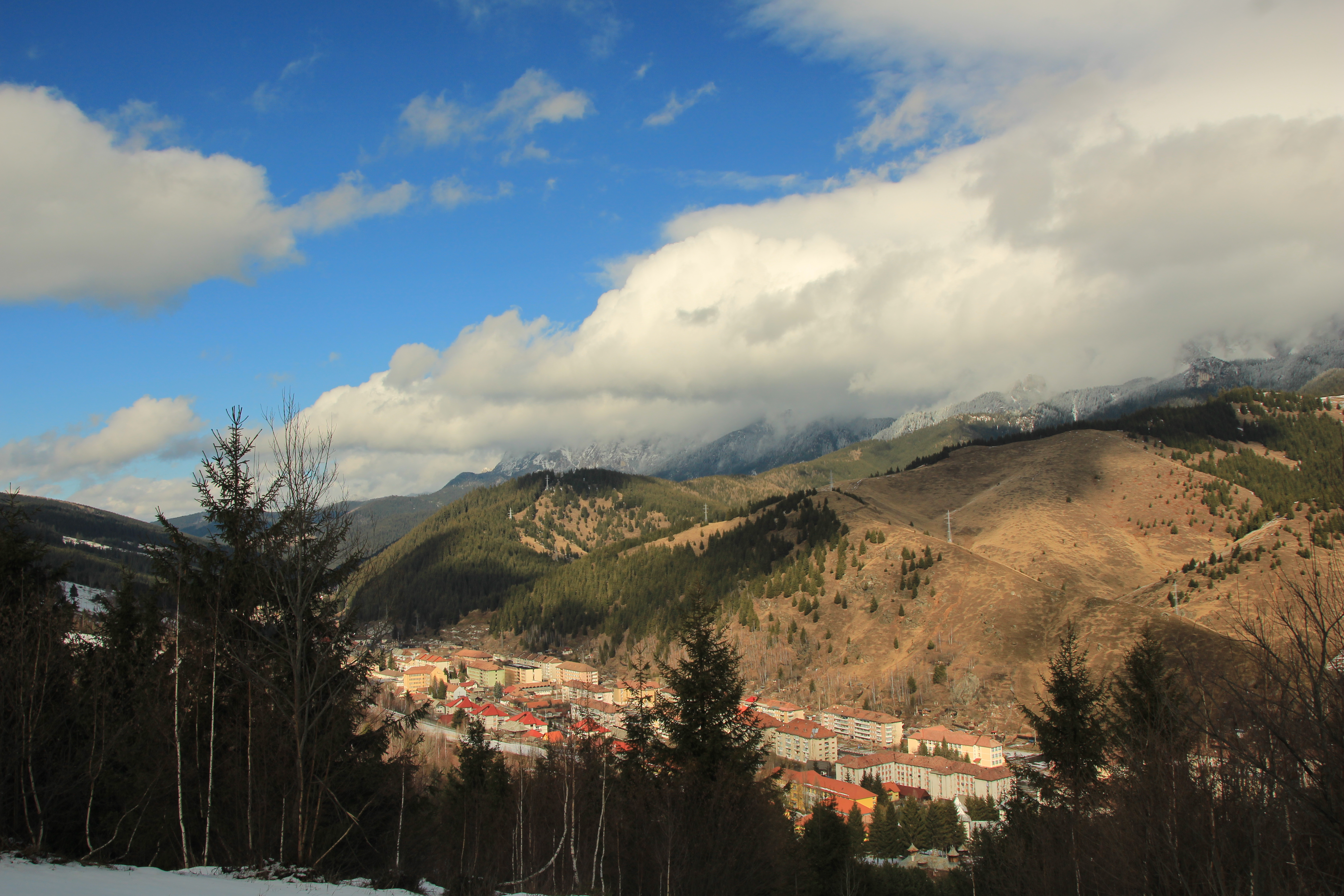
- View of Bălan

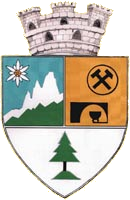
- Coat of arms

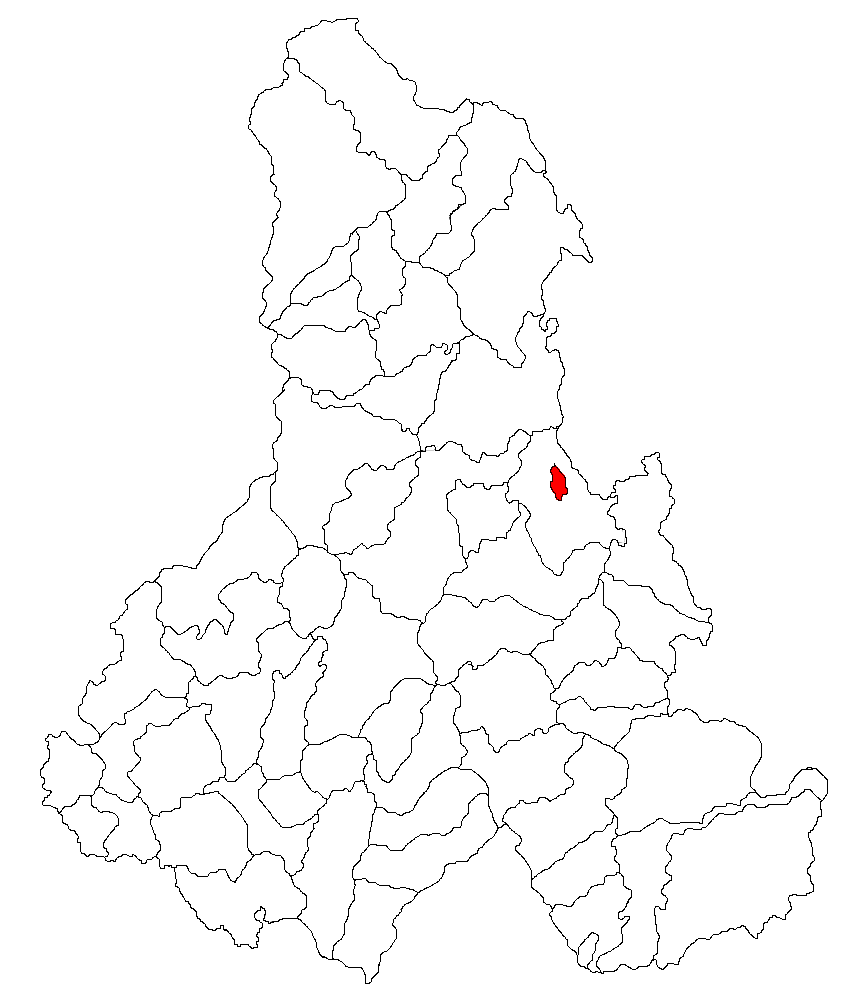
- Location in Harghita County

- Location in Romania
- Coordinates: 46°38′59″N 25°48′36″E
- Country: Romania
- County: Harghita

Government
  - Mayor (2024–2028): Gheorghe Iojiban (Ind.)
- Area: 2.33 km^{2} (0.90 sq mi)
- Elevation: 850 m (2,790 ft)
- Highest elevation: 1,792 m (5,879 ft)
- Population (2021-12-01): 5,414
  - Density: 2,320/km^{2} (6,020/sq mi)
- Time zone: UTC+02:00 (EET)
  - Summer (DST): UTC+03:00 (EEST)
- Postal code: 535200
- Area code: +(40) 266
- Vehicle reg.: HR
- Website: www.orasulbalan.ro/en/

Bălan (German: Kupferbergwerk; Hungarian: Balánbánya, pronounced [ˈbɒlaːmbaːɲɒ]) is a town in Harghita County, Transylvania, Romania. It has historically been one of Transylvania and Romania's most important centers for copper mining, but its mines are no longer operational. Its Romanian name means "blond", the German name means "copper mine" while the Hungarian name means "Balán mine".

== History ==
Bălan was the site of iron mining during the 17th century, but by 1702 the iron stores had been depleted. The copper deposits were discovered in 1785 by János Opra; production began in 1803, and by 1853 six mines were in operation. From that period, the village gradually began to develop into a town. Until 1967, Bălan remained part of the commune of Sândominic, finally gaining official town status in 1968. In 2006 all mining-related activities were stopped by the Romanian government and nowadays the city is counting on ecotourism and small businesses as main economical activities.

== Demographics ==
According to the census from 2011, Bălan had a population of 5,864, of which 3,625 (61.82%) were Romanians and 2,124 (36.22%) were Hungarians. At the 2021 census, the town had a population of 5,414; of those, 59.89% were Romanians, 36.19% Hungarians, and 0.75 Roma.

Historical population
Year	Pop.	±%
1977	12,161	—
1992	10,937	−10.1%
2002	9,295	−15.0%
2011	5,864	−36.9%
2021	5,414	−7.7%
Source: Census data

== Points of interest ==
Bălan's main architectural site is the Roman Catholic Church, consecrated in 1869. Despite the environmental blight of the mining, the surrounding area is uncommonly beautiful, taking in the nearby mountains of Hășmașul Mare and Tarcău, the former a popular hiking destination. The river Olt, one of Romania's most significant, originates in the mountains near the town.

== Geography ==
The town lies in the Ciuc Depression (Romanian Depresiunea Ciucului, Hungarian: Csíki-medence). It is surrounded by the Hășmaș Mountains (Hășmașul Mare and Hășmașul Mic). The town's altitude is 850 m (2,790 ft); this rises to 1,792 m (5,879 ft) at the highest peak of the Hășmaș Mountains. Bălan is crossed by the river Olt.

=== Flora, fauna, and funga ===
Most of the forests around Bălan are spruce forests, but there are also fir, larch and maple forests. There are some flowers species in the area like edelweiss and sweet pea which are protected by law. In the forests there are some edible mushrooms species and fruits like blueberries, raspberries and cranberries.

=== Climate ===
The temperate continental climate has an average temperature of 7 °C (45 °F), falling to −10 °C (14 °F) in winter. There are 1,300–1,400 sunny hours per year. Wind gusts are rare due to the surrounding mountains and forests.

Climate data for Bălan (1979-2025)
Month	Jan	Feb	Mar	Apr	May	Jun	Jul	Aug	Sep	Oct	Nov	Dec	Year
Mean daily maximum °C (°F)	−2.0 (28.4)	0.0 (32.0)	5.0 (41.0)	11.0 (51.8)	16.0 (60.8)	20.0 (68.0)	22.0 (71.6)	22.0 (71.6)	17.0 (62.6)	11.0 (51.8)	6.0 (42.8)	−1.0 (30.2)	10.6 (51.1)
Daily mean °C (°F)	−5.5 (22.1)	−4.0 (24.8)	0.5 (32.9)	6.5 (43.7)	10.5 (50.9)	14.5 (58.1)	16.5 (61.7)	16.0 (60.8)	11.5 (52.7)	6.5 (43.7)	1.5 (34.7)	−4.0 (24.8)	5.9 (42.6)
Mean daily minimum °C (°F)	−9.0 (15.8)	−8.0 (17.6)	−4.0 (24.8)	0.0 (32.0)	5.0 (41.0)	9.0 (48.2)	11.0 (51.8)	10.0 (50.0)	6.0 (42.8)	2.0 (35.6)	−2.0 (28.4)	−7.0 (19.4)	1.3 (34.3)
Source: meteoblue.com
