= Cheile Bicazului-Hășmaș National Park =

National Park in Romania

Coordinates: 46.81198°N 25.81894°E

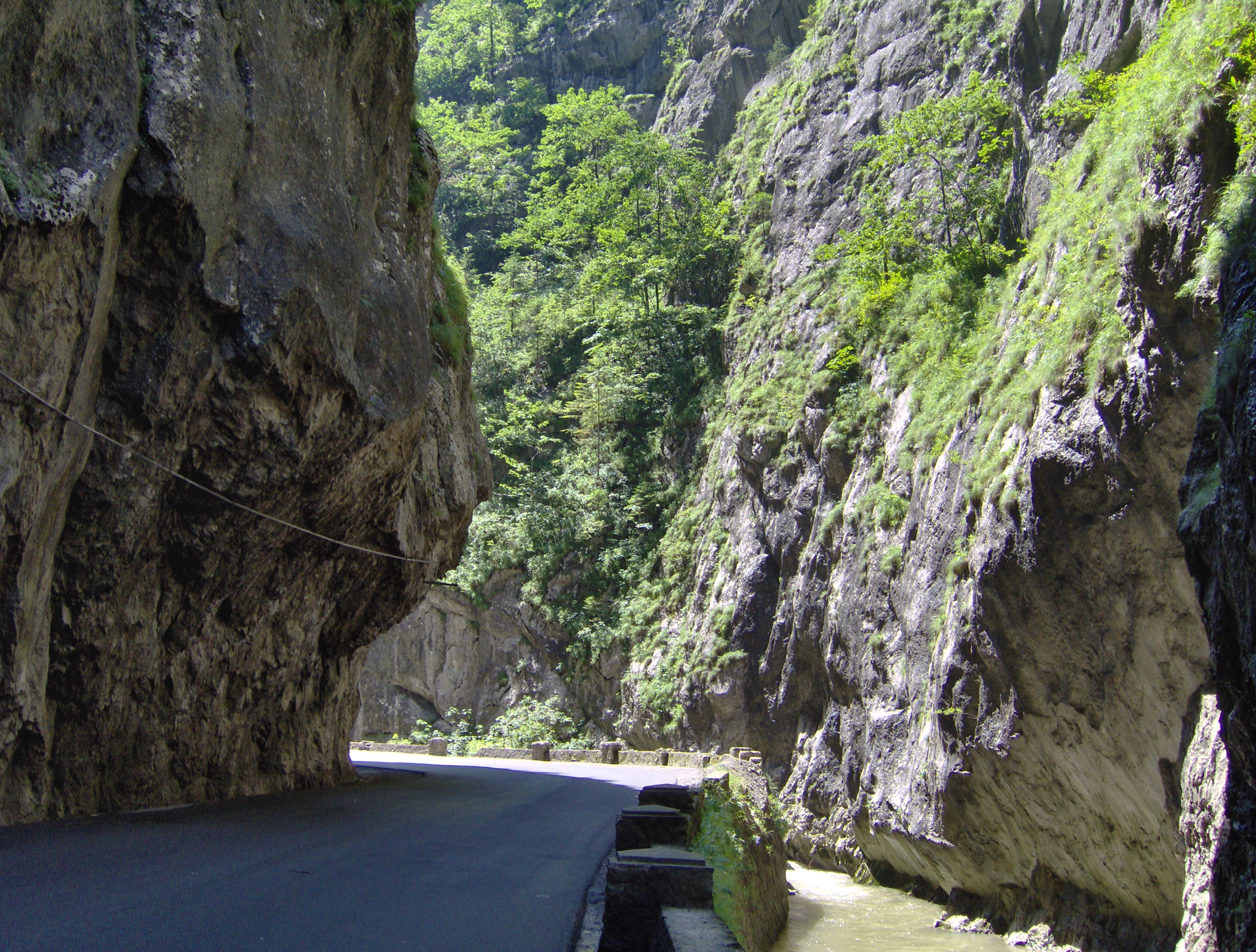
The Bicaz Canyon

The Cheile Bicazului - Hășmaș (Bicaz Gorges - Hășmaș Mountains) National Park is located in north-eastern Romania, in the Eastern Carpathians mountain chain. The reservation territory is part of Neamț and Harghita counties.

The park administration is located in Izvoru Mureșului, in Harghita County.

== Geologic features ==
The park's most important geologic features are:

- Cheile Bicazului (Bicaz Gorges), a deep canyon dug by the river Bicaz
- Lacu Roșu (the Red Lake) – a natural dam lake
- Hășmaș Mountains

Most of the park's territory coincides with the syncline of the Hășmaș Massif, over whose crystalline base lies a stack of sediments from the Mesozoic.

In the Paleozoic, orogeny and tectonic shifts processes pushed older rocks formed in the Proterozoic over more recent rocks formed in the Cambrian. The end of the Paleozoic brings with it the formation of a geosyncline, which in the Triassic is covered by transgression of the sea waters.Thus, on the preexisting crystalline base (which currently appears on the periphery of the massif on the surface), a covering of conglomerates and hard limestone sediments was deposited in the Mesozoic seas over 6 major phases interrupted by terrestrial stages (when the area became temporarily dry land).These intermittent stages denuded the sediment thickness by subaerial erosion and shaped the landscape. The accumulation of sediments in the geosyncline was accompanied by their penetration by volcanic rocks at the end of the Lower Cretaceous. The marine species that lived in the Jurassic and Cretaceous seas left traces in the form of fossils, which are abundant in this area.

== Diversity ==
=== Landscape diversity ===
The landscape of the Hășmaș Mountains takes the form of rounded limestone ridges with a peneplain appearance, from which the walls of the gorges drop away in the form of a precipice. The water of Bicaz, which springs from Lacul Roșu (Red Lake) flows through the cliffs, covering while descending a big level difference. The landscape there features monumental vertical rock walls with trees growing occasionally in the small available habitats. The tributaries of the Bicaz have carved their own gorges in the area - such as those of Lapoșului, Cupașului, Șugăului and Bicăjelului, embellished by rapids, waterfalls or series of potholes.

The subalpine meadow-covered ridges combine with patches of grassy vegetation on slopes and terraces. Viewpoints are formed by the intersection of cliffs with quasi-vertical walls and forests. The latter, sometimes compact spruce or mixed with beech, fir or larch (less common), cover steep conglomerate slopes, whilst spruce or pine trees sometimes grow in rock crevices.

In the park there are various karst landscapes (vertical and overhanging walls, towers (Piatra Altarului, Piatra Singuratică) and limestone needles, chimneys, diaclastic blocks almost detached, rocky peaks, clints or fields of clints (Poiana Tarcău), ridges, karst saddles, scree, gorges, erosion potholes, sinkholes, pit caves (Licaș), caves, petrifying springs with deposits of calcareous tuff and travertine (Cheile Șugăului).

== Zones ==
The park's area of 6,575 ha (16,250 acres) is divided into two zones: the special conservation zone (78%), and the protection zone (22%).

Natural reserves:

- Bicaz Gorge (Neamț County – 1,600 hectares and Harghita County – 2,128 hectares)
- Lacu Roșu
- Cheile Șugăului (10 hectares)
- Avenul Licaș (5 hectares)
- Hășmașul Mare Massif, Piatra Singuratică (the Lonely Stone) and Hășmașul Negru (800 hectares)

== Gallery ==
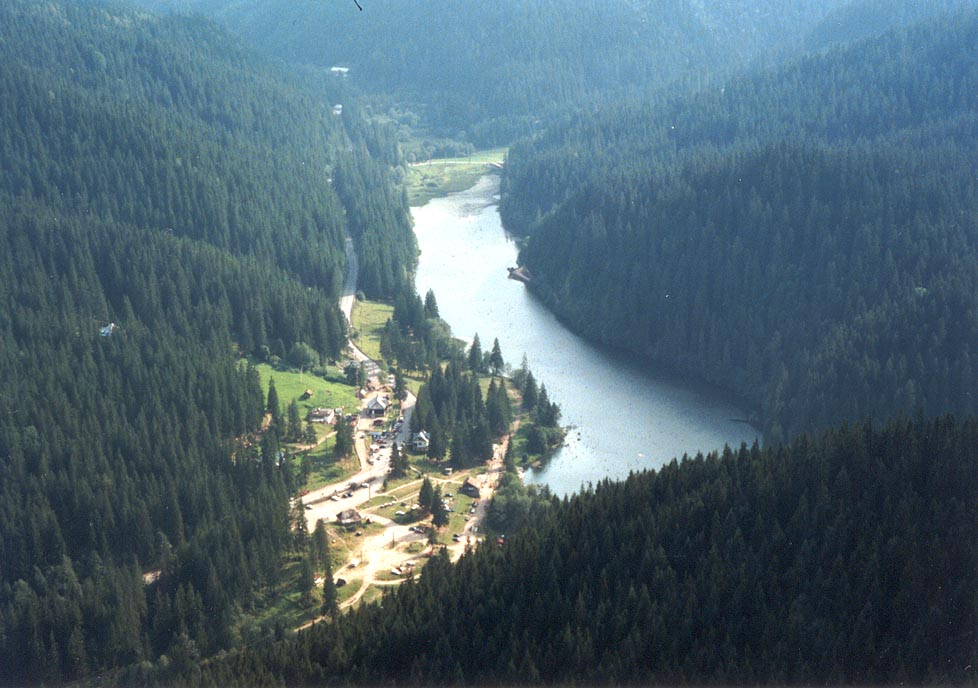
Red Lake

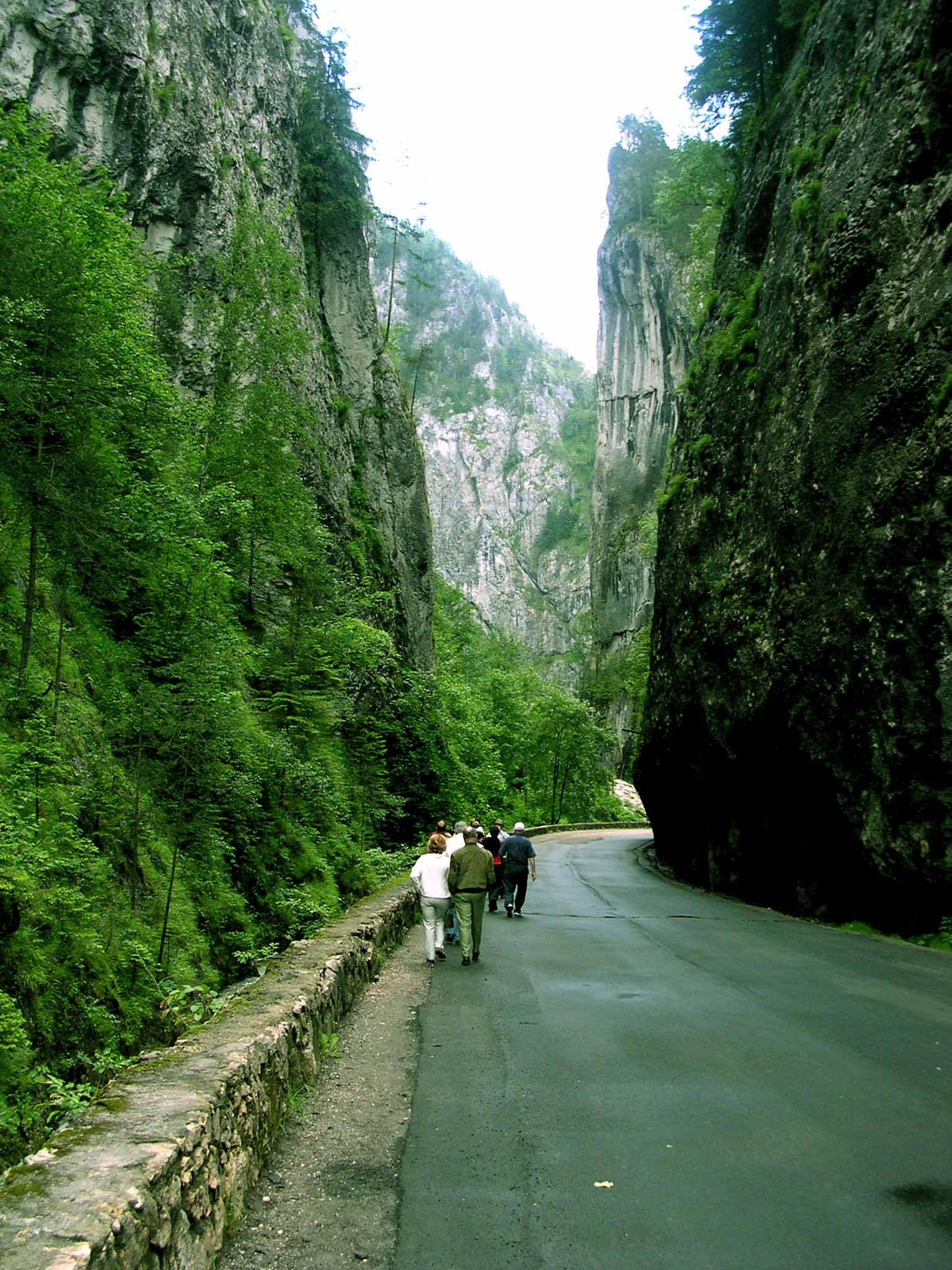
Bicaz Gorge

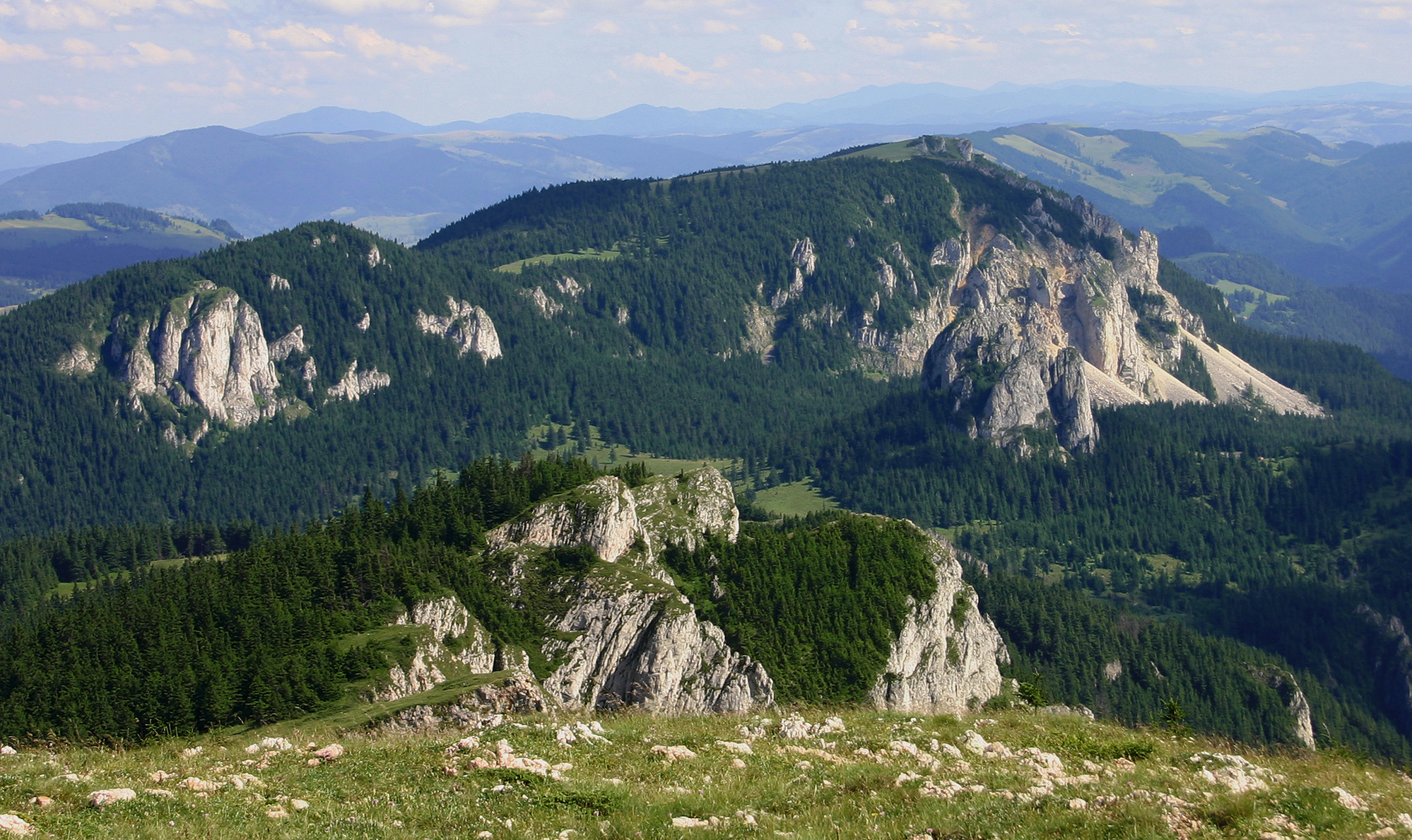
Hășmaș Mountains

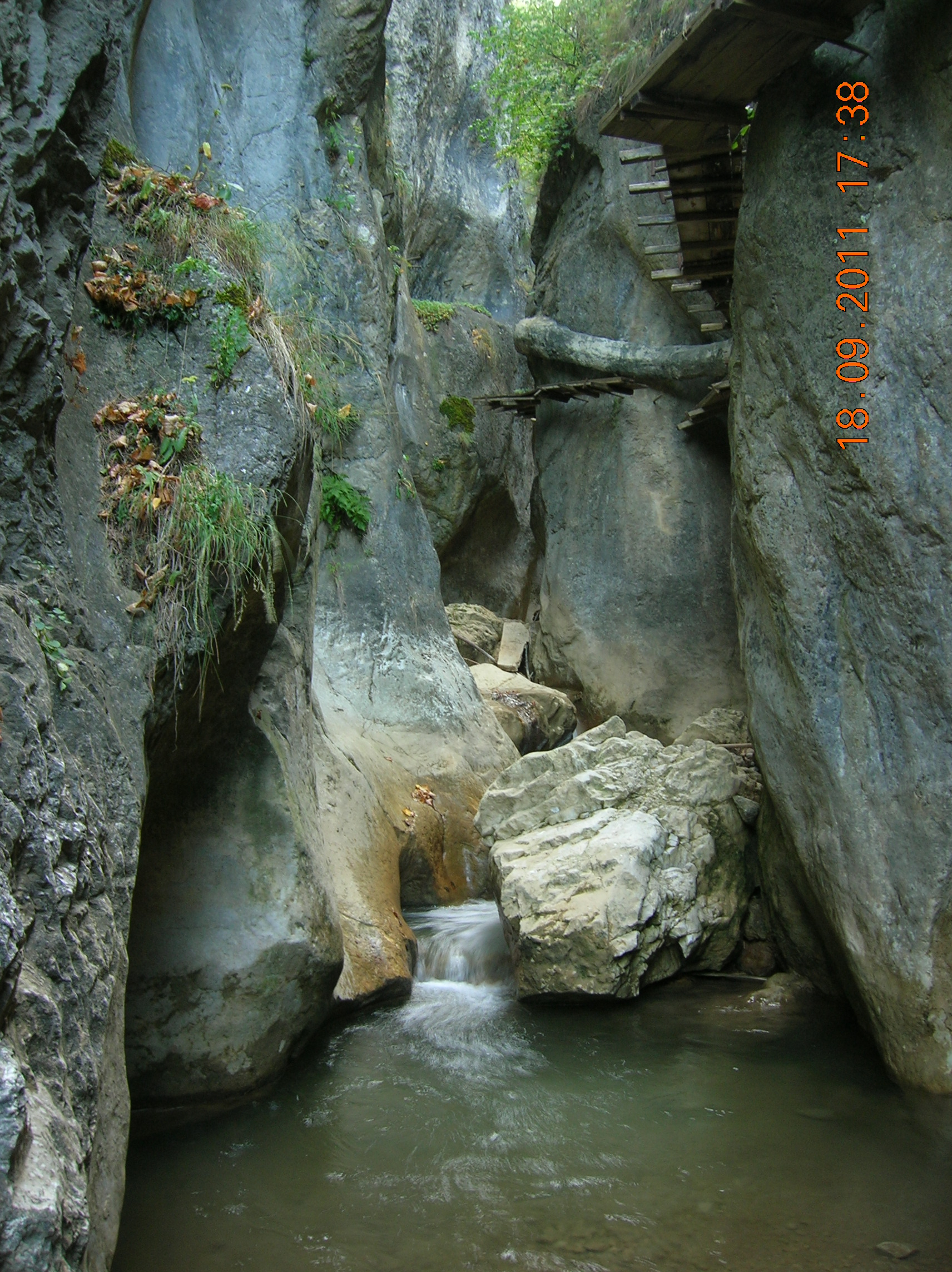
Cheile Șugăului
