= Red Lake (Romania) =

Lake in Lacul Roșu, Neamt County, Romania

Lacul Roșu (Gyilkos-tó)
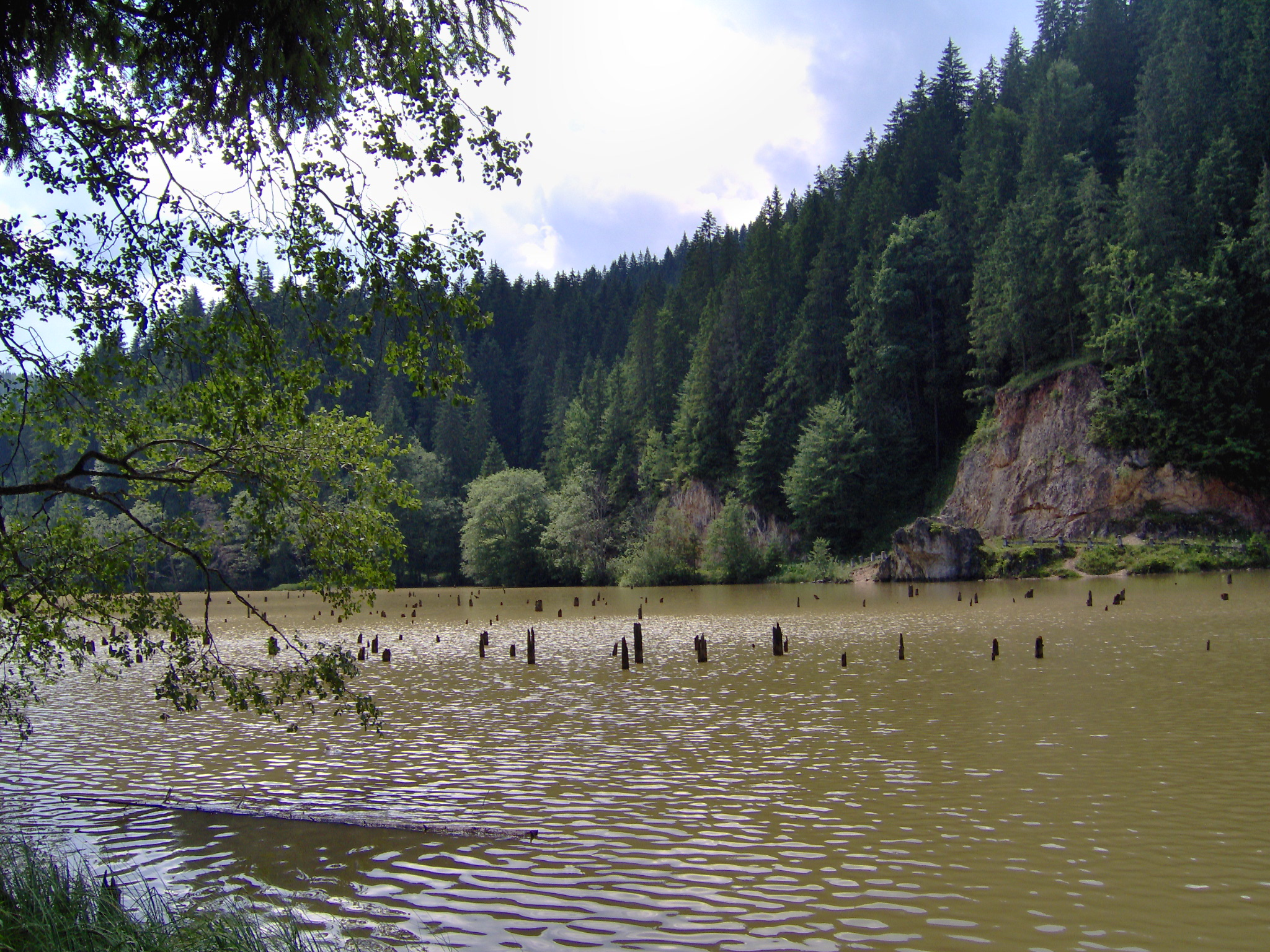

- Location within Romania
- Location: Eastern Carpathians
- Coordinates: 46.78931°N 25.7869°E
- Basin countries: Romania
- Max. length: 8 kilometres (5.0 mi)
- Max. width: 300 metres (980 ft)
- Surface area: 11.47 hectares (28.3 acres)
- Average depth: 9.7 m (32 ft)
- Max. depth: 12.5 metres (41 ft)
- Water volume: 587,500 cubic metres (476.3 acre⋅ft)
- Surface elevation: 983 metres (3,225 ft)

Red Lake 3D

Red Lake is a natural dam lake in Harghita County, Romania. It is located in the Hășmaș Mountains, on the upper course of the Bicaz River, and lies at the foot of the Hășmașul Mare Peak, near the Bicaz Gorge, at a distance of 26 km (16 mi) from Gheorgheni and 30 km (19 mi) from Bicaz.

The lake formed following the collapse of a slope due to the earthquake of January 23, 1838 at 18:45, measuring 6.9 magnitude on the Richter scale, VIII intensity. The landslide blocked the course of the Bicaz River and the lake formed behind this dam.

According to measurements in 1987, the lake has a perimeter of 2,830 m (9,280 ft), and covers an area of 11.4676 ha (28.337 acres); the volume of water that accumulates is 587,503 cubic metres (768,425 yd^{3}). The lake was formed at an altitude of 983 m (3,225 ft), in a depression with a predominant subalpine climate.

== Location ==
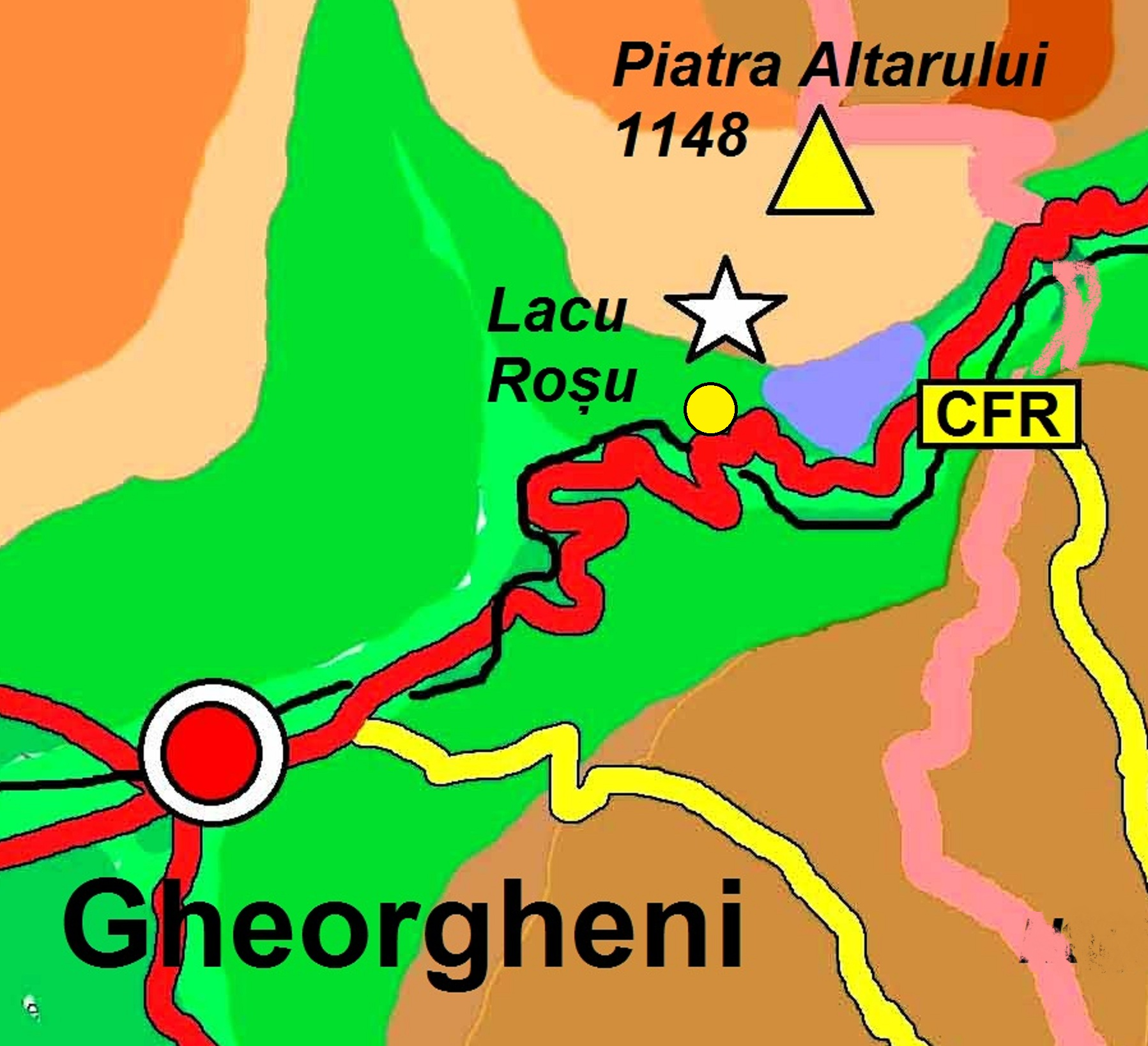
Location of the Red Lake

The Red Lake is located between Suhardul Mic and Suhardul Mare peaks on the north side, the Podu Calului Mountains to the south-west, the Licaș and Chișhovoș Mountains to the north-west, the Făgetul Ciucului peak to the north-east, and Muntele Ucigaș (The Killer Mount) to the east.

The lake is powered by four large streams and 12 temporary water courses, of which the most important are Vereșchiu, Licaș, Suhardul, and Pârâul Oii (Oaia). The Bicaz River streams out of the Red Lake and continues towards the Bicaz Gorge, about 4 km (2.5 mi) to the north-east.

== Lake formation ==
Although the Red Lake is a young formation, the conditions and time of the lake formation are very much discussed. During the forming, the lake area was a hardly accessible area, economically unexplored. According to Franz Herbich, the Red Lake was formed in 1838. This is also justified by the earthquake of January 23, 1838, which was repeated in February and could have caused a landslide. Another year of forming is 1837, which can be argued by very violent storms and heavy rains. About this period writes Ditrói Puskás Ferenc in his work, "The History of Borsec". It is essential that the lake was formed by moving the clay mass deposited during the last ice age on the north-western slope of Mount Ghilcoș.

Soon after the valley had been closed, the fir forest was flooded, and the trees were petrified, giving a rare peculiarity to the whole landscape. In the first years of forming, the lake has expanded further - about a kilometer higher in the valley of the stream, but over time the natural dam eroded, the water level stabilizing at the current level.

== Tourism ==
The surroundings of the lake have a pleasant microclimate. The average multiannual temperature is 8 °C (46 °F), above the 6 °C (43 °F) average of the intramontane depressions. The valley is virtually free of winds, very clean air rich in natural aerosols, scenic surroundings provide excellent conditions for those who are seeking for sources of rapid regeneration naturally. Since the 1900s, it has been the recreational spa tourism that has brought development to the tourist services of this area.

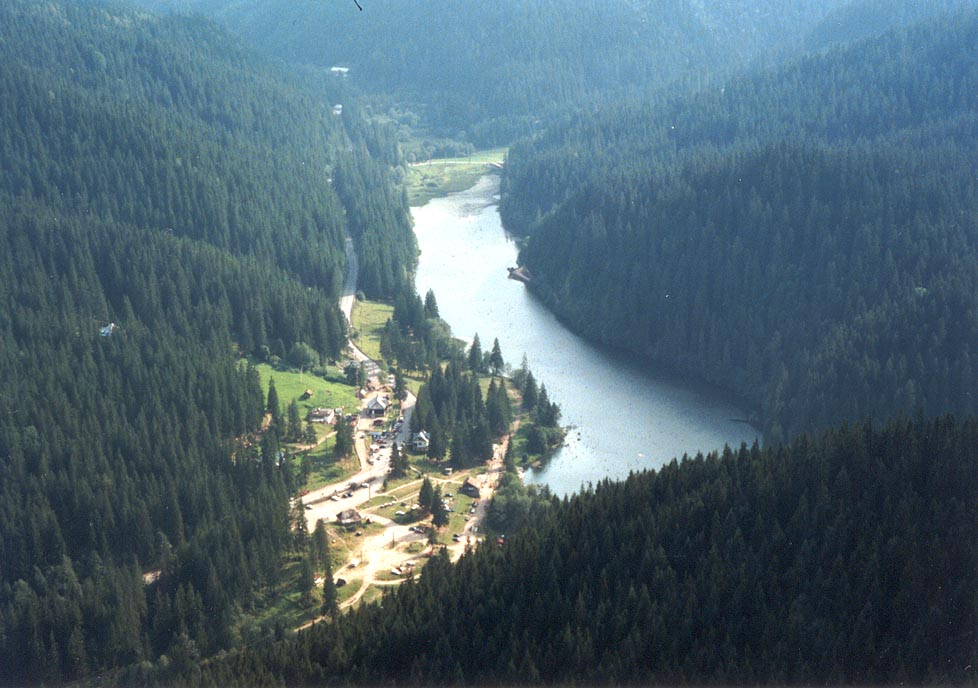

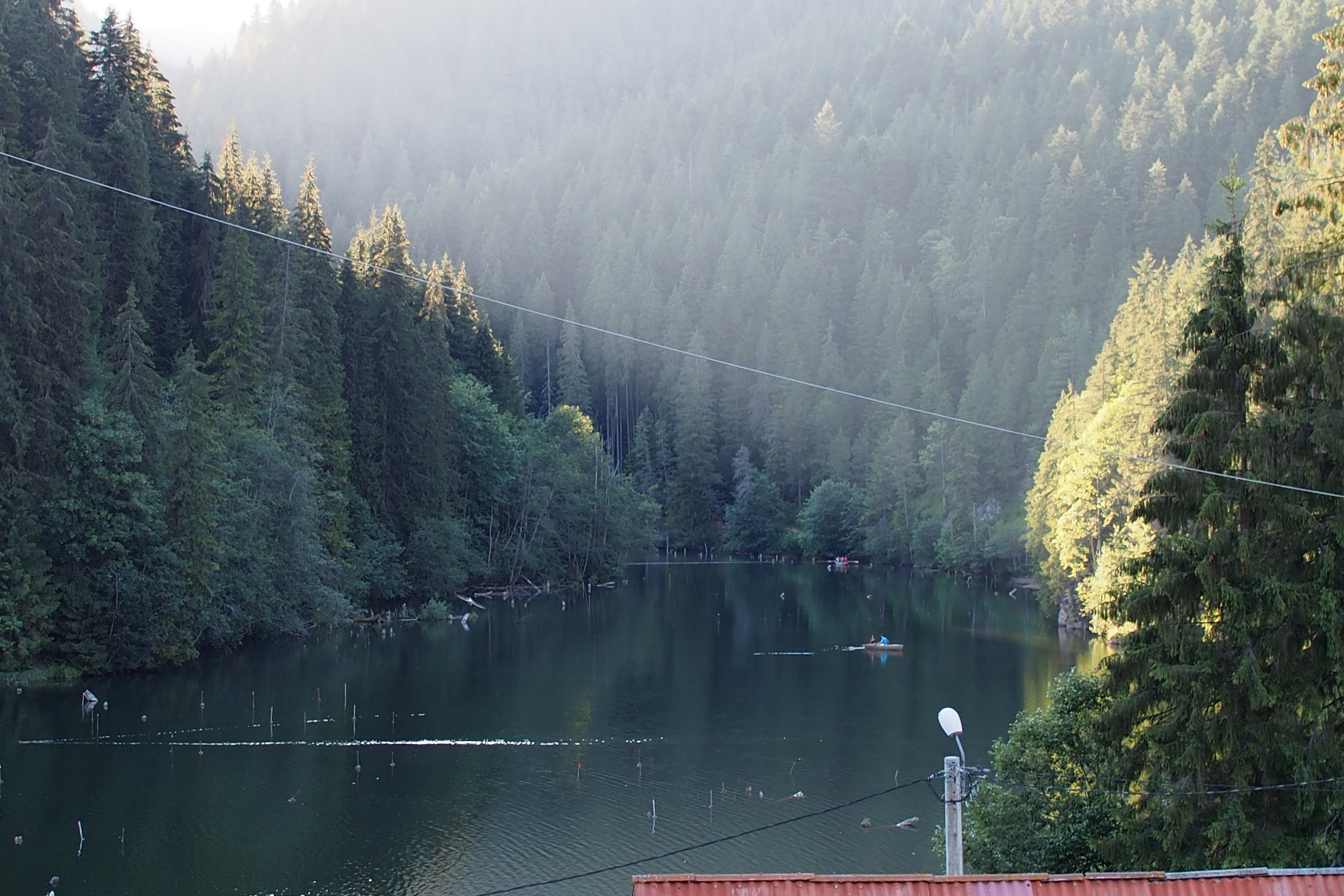

== See also ==
- Bicaz Gorge
- Cheile Bicazului-Hășmaș National Park
