= Voșlăbeni =

Voșlăbeni Vasláb
- Commune
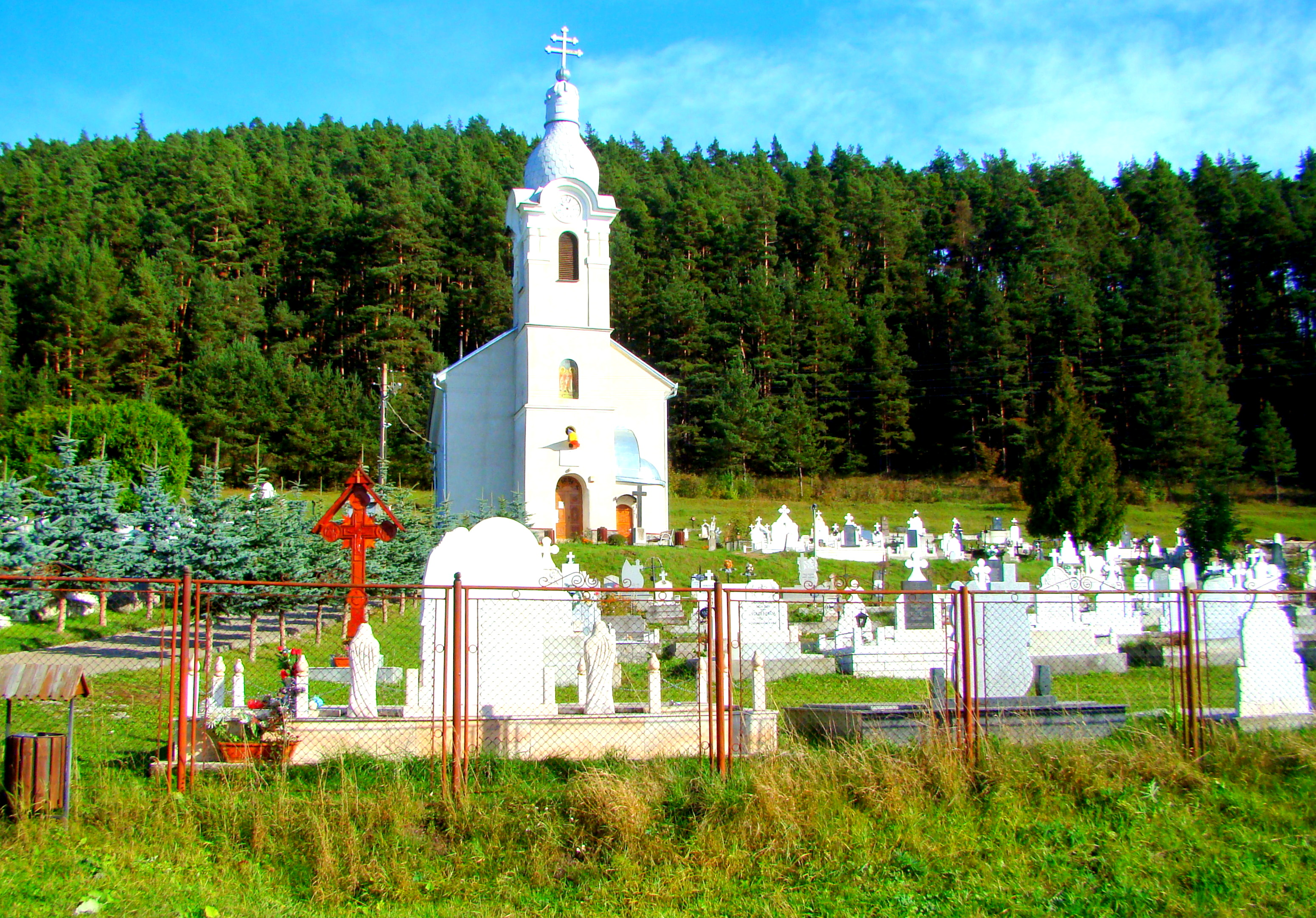
- Church of the Archangels in Voșlăbeni

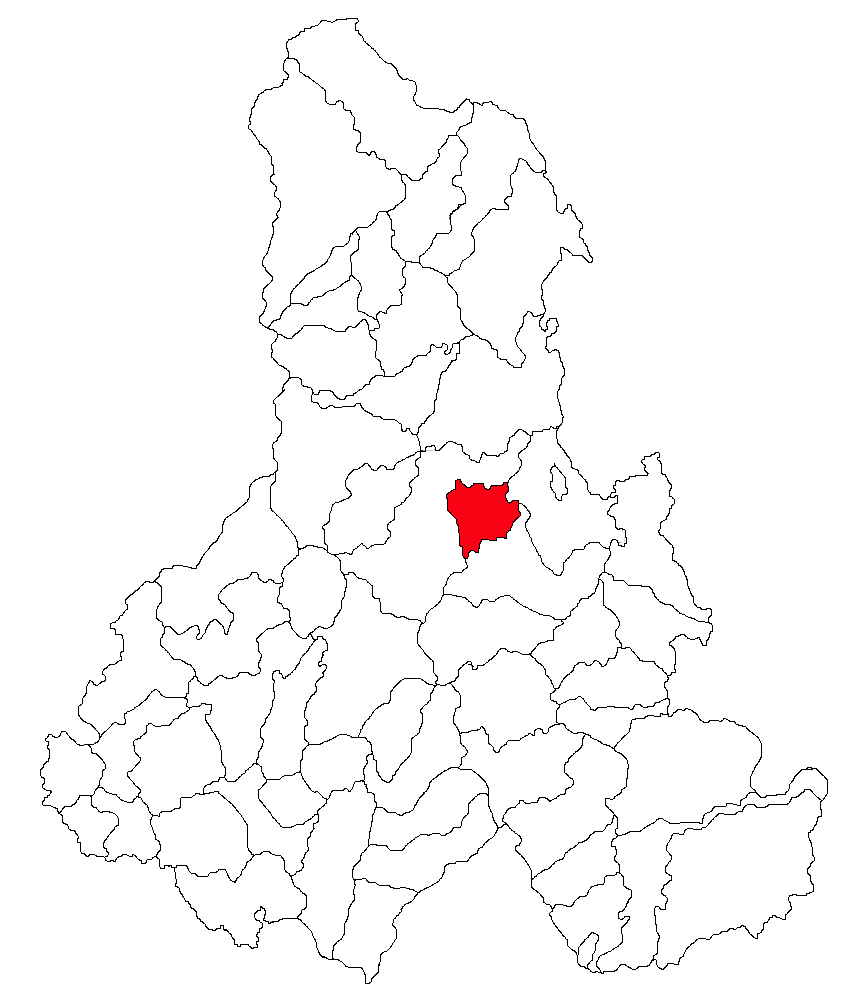
- Location in Harghita County

- Location in Romania
- Coordinates: 46°39′N 25°38′E
- Country: Romania
- County: Harghita

Government
  - Mayor (2020–2024): Mihail Dumitru Tinca (PSD)
- Area: 59.52 km^{2} (22.98 sq mi)
- Elevation: 786 m (2,579 ft)
- Population (2021-12-01): 1,815
  - Density: 30.49/km^{2} (78.98/sq mi)
- Time zone: UTC+02:00 (EET)
  - Summer (DST): UTC+03:00 (EEST)
- Postal code: 537355
- Area code: +40 266
- Vehicle reg.: HR
- Website: voslobeni.ro

Voșlăbeni (also Voșlobeni; Hungarian: Vasláb, Hungarian pronunciation: [ˈvɒʃlaːb]) is a commune in Harghita County, Transylvania, Romania composed of two villages: Izvoru Mureșului (Marosfő) and Voșlăbeni.

The river Mureș has its source in Izvoru Mureșului, at an altitude of 866 m (2,841 ft). The Chindeni joins the Mureș near Voșlăbeni. The administration of the Cheile Bicazului-Hășmaș National Park is located in Izvoru Mureșului.

== Demographics ==
In 2011, 1,921 people lived in the commune, of which 1,127 or 58.67% are Romanians, 771 or 40.14% are Hungarians. Of the latter, around half live in the village of Izvoru Mureșului, which has a Hungarian majority of 58.75%.
