= Hășmaș Mountains =

Scenic mountain range in Romania

Coordinates: 46°45′N 25°45′E

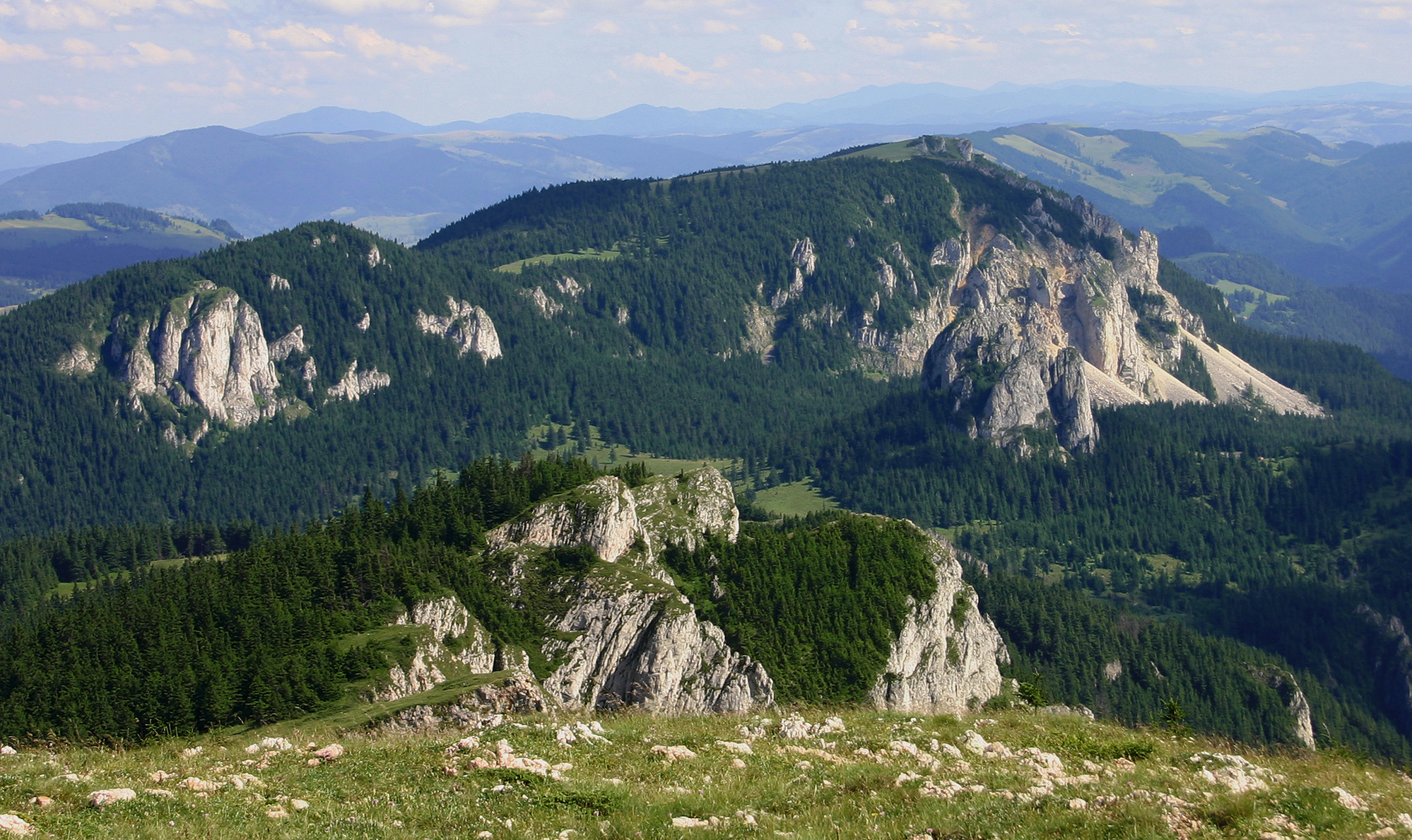
The Hășmaș Mountains

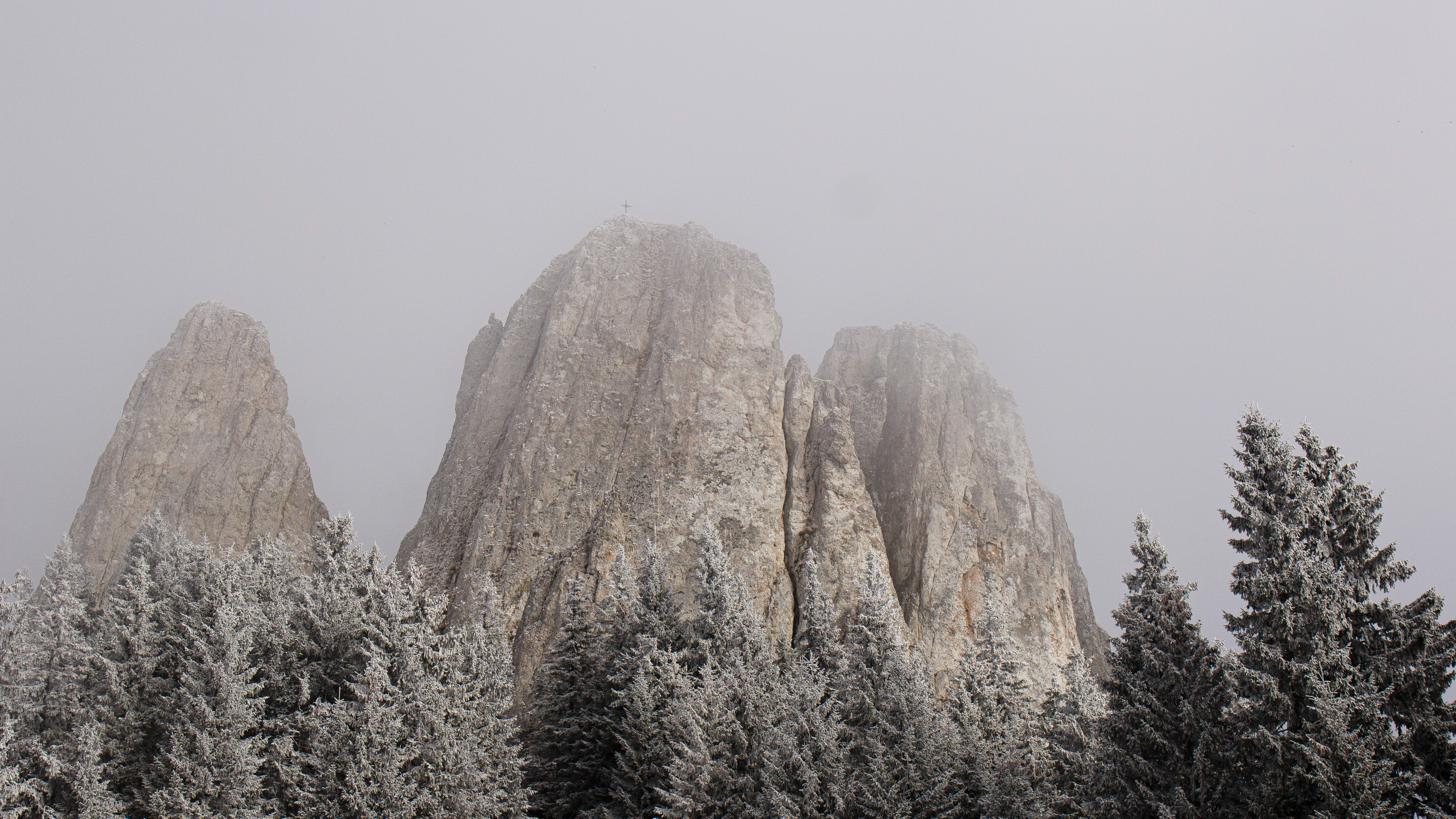
Staggering cliffs such as this one define the mountain range

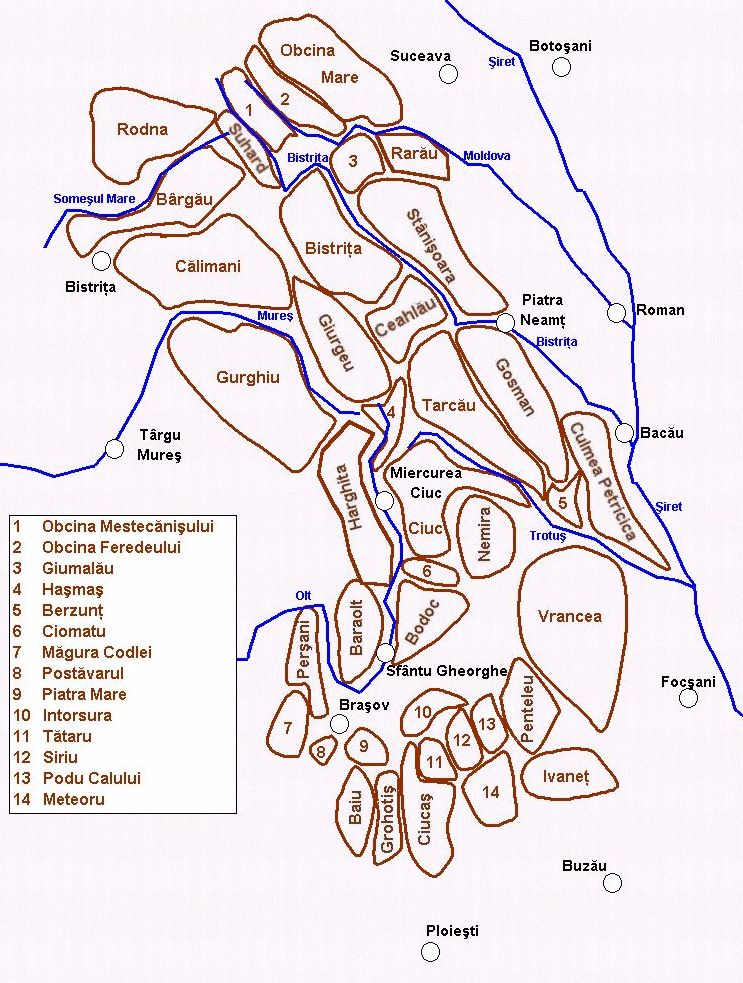
Map of the Eastern Carpathians, with the Hășmaș Mountains in the center

The Hășmaș Mountains (Romanian: Munții Hășmaș; Hungarian: Hagymás-hegység) are limestone and sandstone massifs located in Romania, in the Inner Eastern Carpathians group of the Eastern Carpathian Mountains. They belong to the Bistrița Mountains range, and are bordered by the Giurgeu Mountains to the north, the Tarcău Mountains to the east, the Ciuc Mountains to the south, and the Harghita Mountains to the west.

The Hășmaș Mountains include many cliffs and gorges, such as the Bicaz Gorge and the Panaghia Cliff. The highest peak is Hășmașul Mare Peak, at 1,793 m (5,883 ft).

The mountains contain the Cheile Bicazului-Hășmaș natural reserve. There is a lake known as the Lacul Roșu ("Red Lake"), named after the red clay that lay there.
