= Harghita County =

County of Romania

Coordinates: 46.36°N 25.80°E

Harghita County Județul Harghita Hargita megye
- County
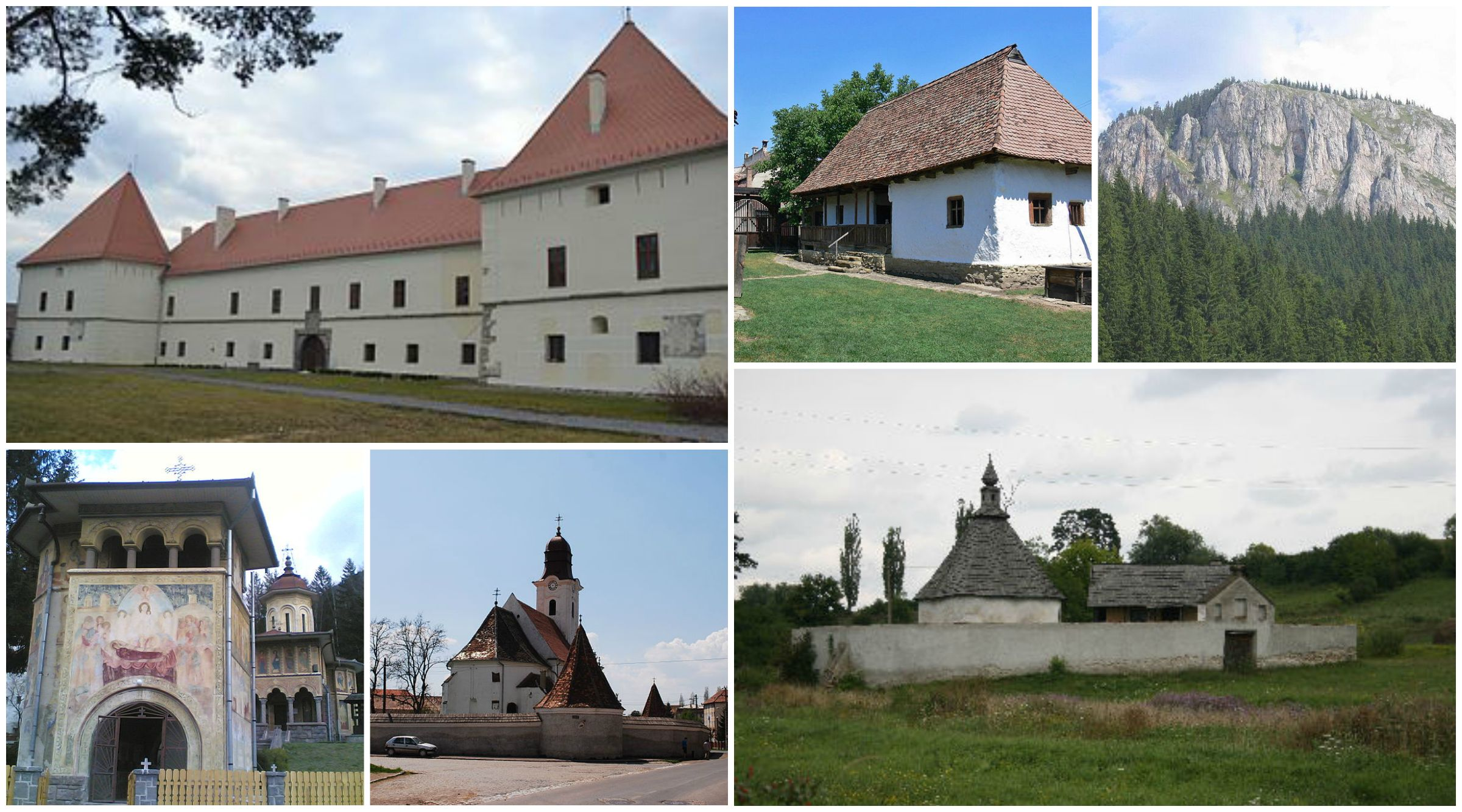

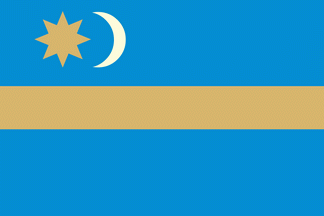
- Flag Coat of arms

- Harghita county, territorial location
- Country: Romania
- Development region^{1}: Centru
- Historic region: Transylvania
- Capital city (Reședință de județ): Miercurea Ciuc

Government
  - Type: County Council
  - President of the County Council: Barna-Botond Bíró (RMDSZ)
  - Prefect^{2}: Sándor Petres

Area
  - Total: 6,639 km^{2} (2,563 sq mi)
  - Rank: 13th in Romania

Population (2021-12-01)
  - Total: 291,950
  - Rank: 33rd in Romania
  - Density: 46/km^{2} (120/sq mi)
- Time zone: UTC+2 (EET)
  - Summer (DST): UTC+3 (EEST)
- Postal Code: 53wxyz^{3}
- Area code: +40 x66^{4}
- Car Plates: HR^{5}
- GDP: US$4.450 billion (2025)
- GDP per capita: US$15,242 (2025)
- Website: County Council; County Prefecture
- ^{1}The developing regions of Romania have no administrative role. They were formed just to attract funds from the European Union^{2} as of 2007, the Prefect is not a politician, but a public functionary. The Prefect is not allowed to be a member of a political party, and is banned from having any political activity in the first six months after the resignation (or exclusion) from the public functionary corps^{3}w, x, y, and z are digits that indicate the city, the street, part of the street, or even the building of the address^{4}x is a digit indicating the operator: 2 for the former national operator, Romtelecom, and 3 for the other ground telephone networks^{5}used on both the plates of the vehicles that operate only in the county limits (like utility vehicles, ATVs, etc.), and the ones used outside the county

Harghita County (Romanian: Județul Harghita, Romanian pronunciation: [harˈɡita] and Hungarian: Hargita megye, pronounced [ˈhɒrɡitɒ]) is a county (județ) in the center of Romania, in eastern Transylvania, with the county seat at Miercurea Ciuc.

== Demographics ==
=== 2002 census ===
In 2002, Harghita County had a population of 326,222 and a population density of 52/km^{2}.

- Hungarians – 84.62% (or 276,038)
- Romanians – 14.06% (or 45,870)
- Romani – 1.18% (or 3,835)
- Others – 0.14%

=== 2011 census ===
In 2011, it had a population of 302,432 and a population density of 46/km^{2}.

- Hungarians – 85.21% (or 257,707)
- Romanians – 12.6% (or 39,119)
- Romani – 1.71% (or 5,326)
- Others – 0.09% (or 278).

=== 2021 census ===
In 2021, it had a population of 291,950, and a population density of 43/km^{2}.

- Hungarians – 85.67% (or 232,157)
- Romanians – 12.41% (or 33,634)
- Romani - 1.82% (or 4,928)
- Others – 0.1% (or 282).

Harghita county has the highest percentage of Hungarians in Romania, just ahead of Covasna county. The Hungarians form the majority of the population in most of the county's municipalities, with Romanians concentrated in the northern and eastern part of the county (particularly Toplița and Bălan), as well as in the enclave of Voșlăbeni. Harghita and neighboring Covasna County are the only two counties in Romania that do not have an ethnic Romanian majority.

The Székelys of Harghita are mostly Roman Catholic, with Reformed and Unitarian minorities, while the ethnic Romanians are primarily Orthodox. Catholicism is strongest in the east, in the former Csíkszék, while Protestants are concentrated in the south and west of Odorheiu Secuiesc. By religion, the county is divided roughly as follows:

- Roman Catholic (65%)
- Orthodox (13%)
- Reformed (13%)
- Unitarian (7%)
- Other (2%)

Historical population
Year	Pop.	±% p.a.
1930	250,194	—
1948	258,495	+0.18%
1956	273,964	+0.73%
1966	282,392	+0.30%
1977	326,310	+1.32%
1992	347,637	+0.42%
2002	326,222	−0.63%
2011	304,969	−0.75%
2021	291,950	−0.44%

== Geography ==
Harghita County has a total area of 6,639 km^{2}.

Harghita consists primarily of mountains, connected to the Eastern Carpathians, such as the Ciuc and Harghita Mountains; volcanic plateaux, foothills, and the more densely populated river valleys.

The mountains are volcanic in origin, and the region is known for its excellent hot mineral springs. Harghita is known as one of the coldest regions in Romania, although summers can be quite warm.

It is in this county that two of the most important rivers in Romania, the Mureș and the Olt, originate. These rivers' origins, near the villages of Izvoru Mureșului and Sândominic, are only a few miles apart; yet the Mureș flows west to the Tisza, while the Olt flows south to the Danube. In the western part of the county the two Târnava rivers (Târnava Mare and Târnava Mică) flow to the Târnava Plateau, which is part of the Transylvanian Plateau.

Harghita's spectacular natural scenery includes Sfânta Ana Lake, a volcanic crater lake near the town of Băile Tușnad; Lacul Roșu a mountain lake in the northeast near the town of Gheorgheni, and Cheile Bicazului, a dramatic, narrow canyon formed by the Bicaz stream. The county is renowned for its spa resorts and mineral waters.

=== Neighbours ===
- Neamț County and Bacău County to the East.
- Mureș County to the West.
- Suceava County to the North.
- Brașov County and Covasna County to the South.

== Economy ==
The county's main industries:

- Wood industry – up to 30%;
- Foods and beverages industry;
- Textile and leather processing;
- Mechanical components.

== Tourism ==
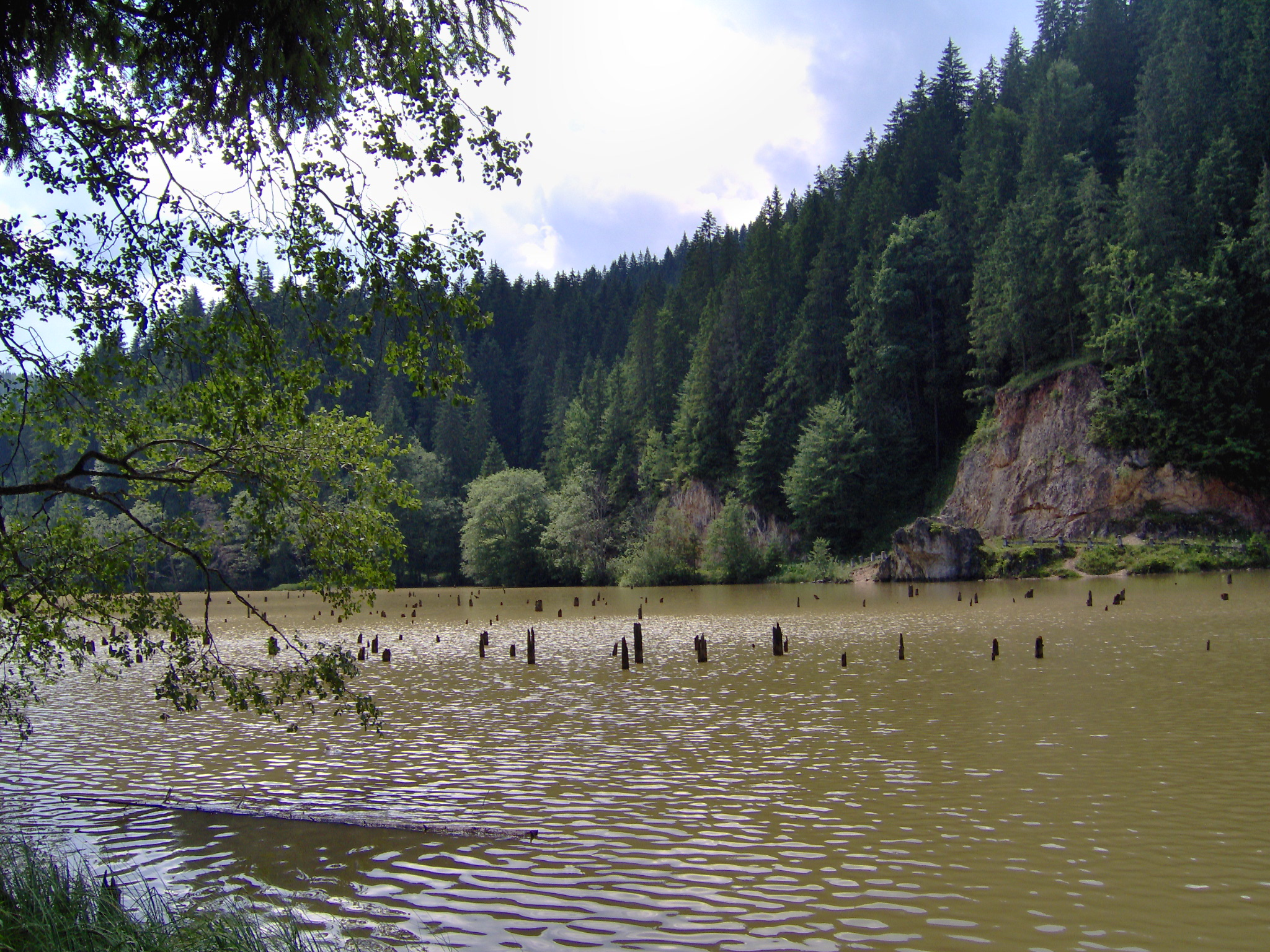
Lacul Roșu

The main tourist attractions in Harghita county are

- The cities of Miercurea Ciuc, Odorheiu Secuiesc, Gheorgheni, Toplița.
- The mountain resorts of
  - Băile Tușnad
  - Borsec
  - Lacul Roșu
  - Izvorul Mureşului
  - Harghita Băi
- Lake Sfânta Ana (crater lake)
- The Via Transilvanica long-distance hiking and biking trail, which crosses the county

== Politics ==
The Harghita County Council, renewed at the 2024 local elections, consists of 30 councilors, with the following party composition:

Party	Seats	Current Council
Democratic Alliance of Hungarians in Romania (UDMR/RMDSZ)	23	
Hungarian Alliance Of Transylvania	3	
Social Democratic Party (PSD)	2	
National Liberal Party (PNL)	2	

== Administrative divisions ==
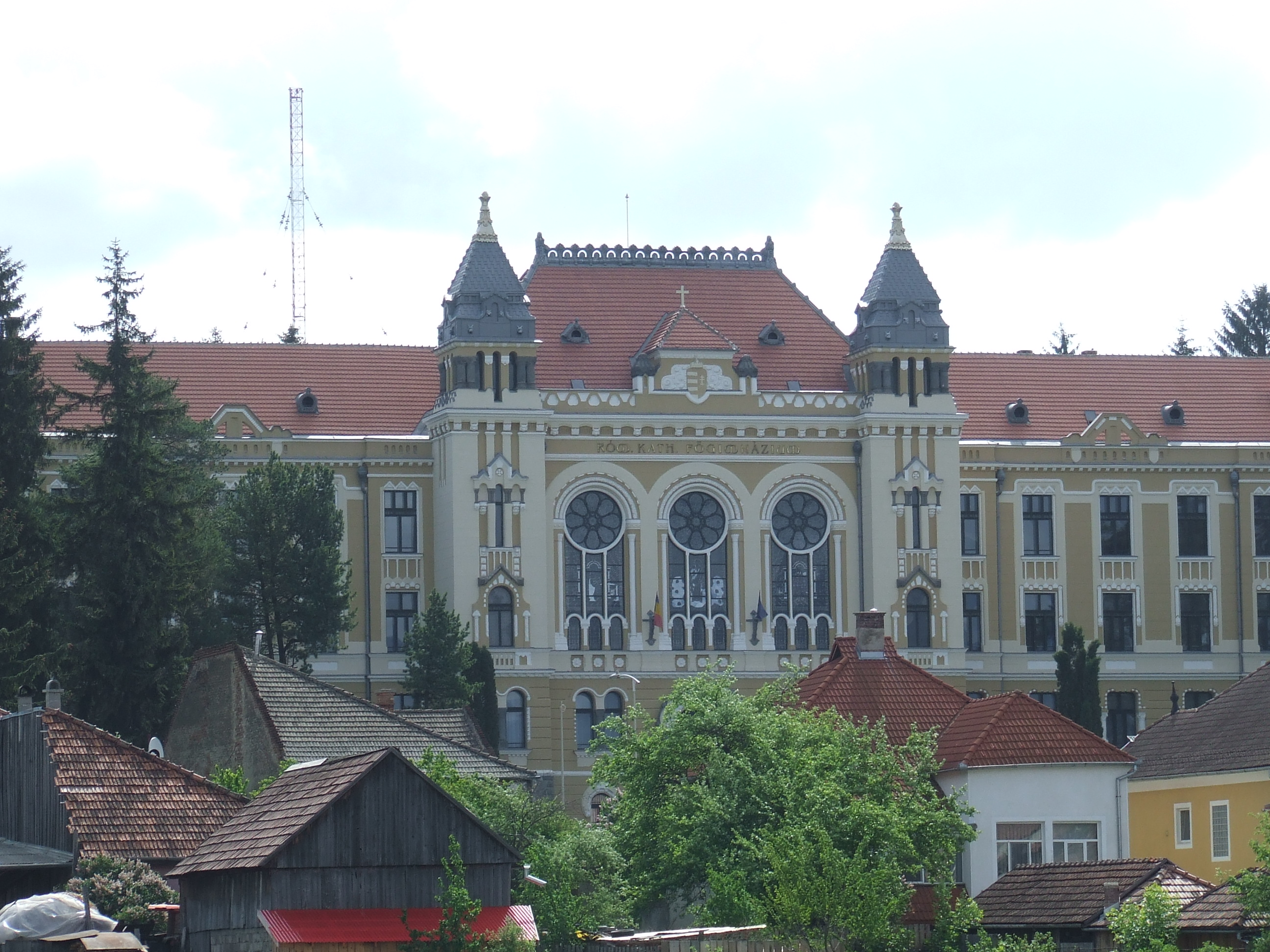
Miercurea Ciuc

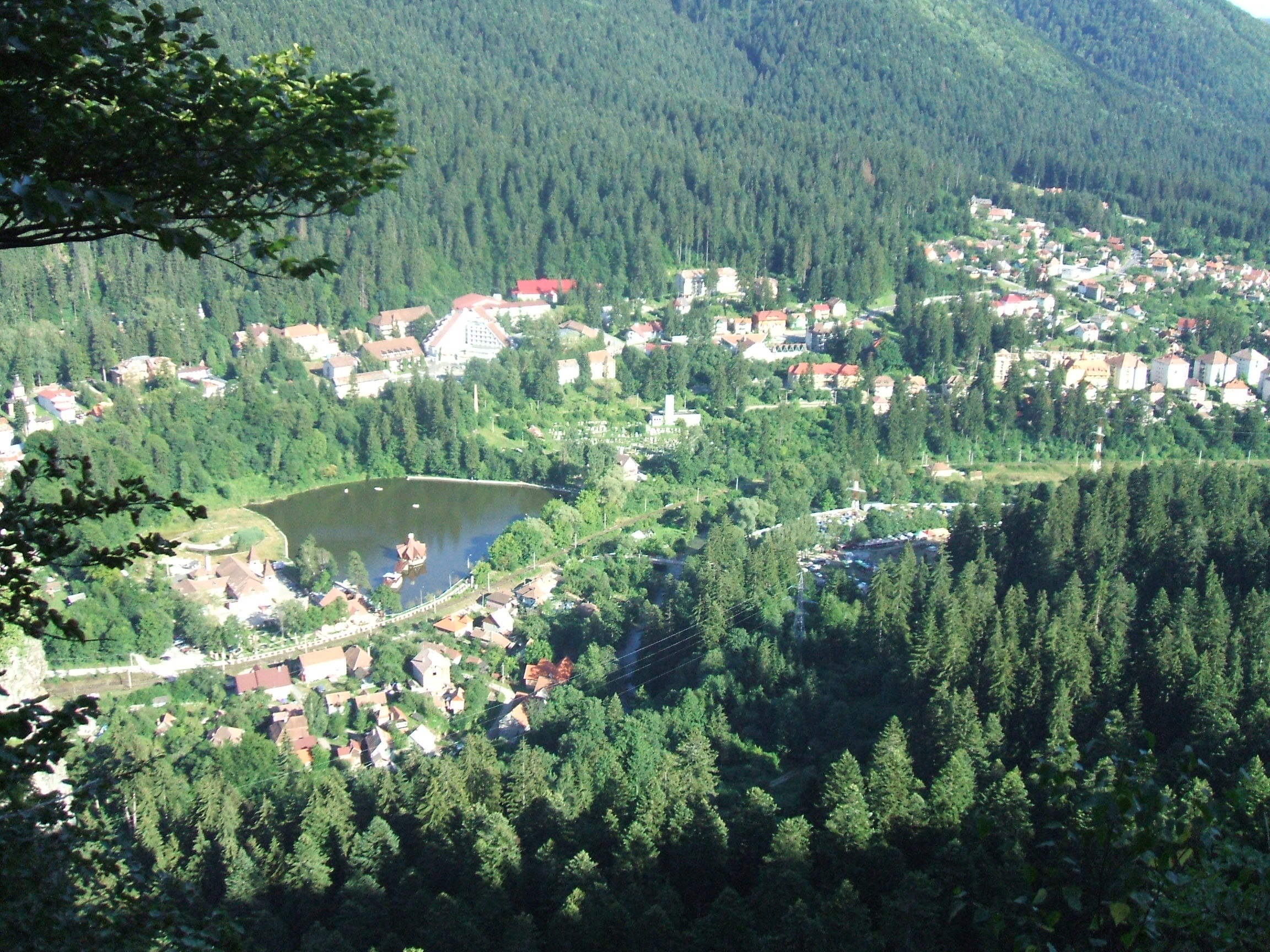
Băile Tușnad

Harghita County has 4 municipalities, 5 towns and 58 communes

Municipalities:

- Gheorgheni
- Miercurea Ciuc – county seat; population: 37,980 (as of 2011)
- Odorheiu Secuiesc
- Toplița

Towns:

- Băile Tușnad
- Bălan
- Borsec
- Cristuru Secuiesc
- Vlăhița

Communes:

- Atid
- Avrămești
- Bilbor
- Brădești
- Căpâlnița
- Cârța
- Ciceu
- Ciucsângeorgiu
- Ciumani
- Corbu
- Corund
- Cozmeni
- Dănești
- Dârjiu
- Dealu
- Ditrău
- Feliceni
- Frumoasa
- Gălăutaș
- Joseni
- Lăzarea
- Leliceni
- Lueta
- Lunca de Jos
- Lunca de Sus
- Lupeni
- Mădăraș
- Mărtiniș
- Merești
- Mihăileni
- Mugeni
- Ocland
- Păuleni-Ciuc
- Plăieșii de Jos
- Porumbeni
- Praid
- Racu
- Remetea
- Săcel
- Sâncrăieni
- Sândominic
- Sânmartin
- Sânsimion
- Sântimbru
- Sărmaș
- Satu Mare
- Secuieni
- Siculeni
- Șimonești
- Subcetate
- Suseni
- Tomești
- Tulgheș
- Tușnad
- Ulieș
- Vărșag
- Voșlăbeni
- Zetea

== See also ==
- Former Csík County of the Kingdom of Hungary
