= Corund =

Corund Korond
- Commune
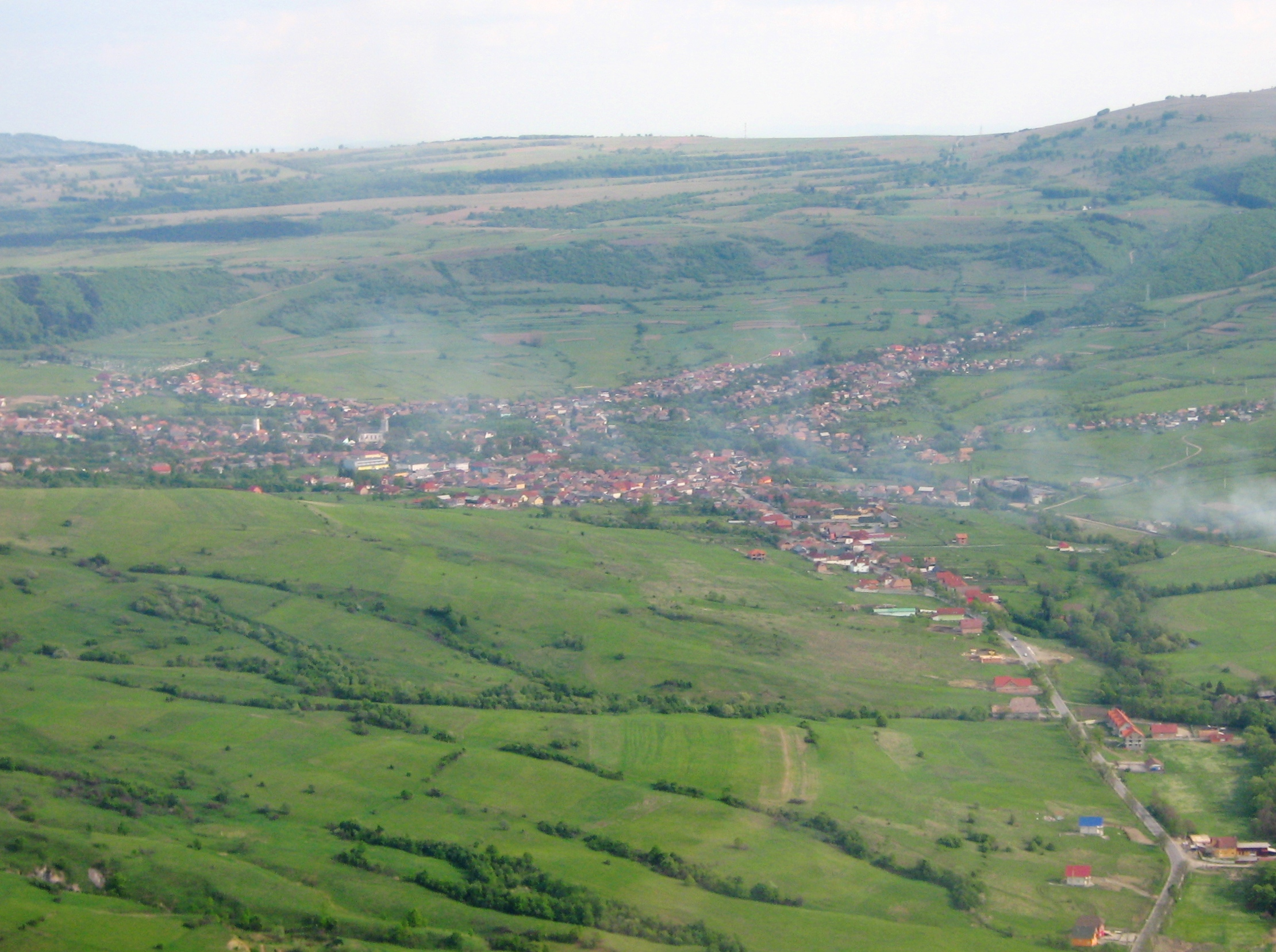

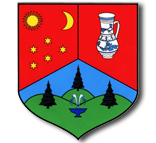
- Coat of arms

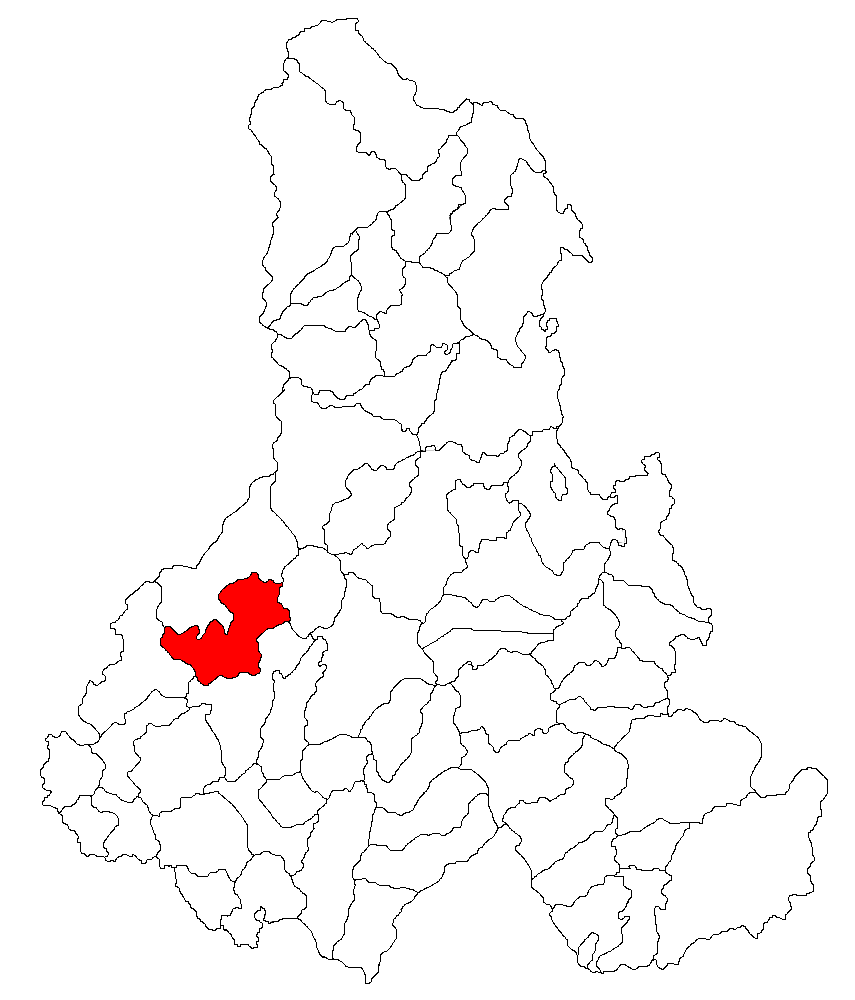
- Location in Harghita County

- Location in Romania
- Coordinates: 46°28′N 25°11′E
- Country: Romania
- County: Harghita

Government
  - Mayor (2020–2024): Mihály Katona (UDMR)
- Area: 113.51 km^{2} (43.83 sq mi)
- Population (2021-12-01): 6,394
  - Density: 56.33/km^{2} (145.9/sq mi)
- Time zone: UTC+02:00 (EET)
  - Summer (DST): UTC+03:00 (EEST)
- Postal code: 537060
- Area code: +40 266
- Vehicle reg.: HR
- Website: www.korond.ro

Corund (Hungarian: Korond, Hungarian pronunciation: [ˈkorond] ) is a commune in Harghita County, Romania. It lies in the Székely Land, an ethno-cultural region in eastern Transylvania, in the "Salt Region" (Ținutul Sării or Sóvidék), and is formed of five villages: Atia (Atyha), Calonda (Kalonda), Corund (Korond), Fântâna Brazilor (Fenyőkút), and Valea lui Pavel (Pálpataka).

While the village of Corund is renowned for its pottery and ceramics, the village of Atia is on the route of the Via Transilvanica long-distance trail.

== Governance ==
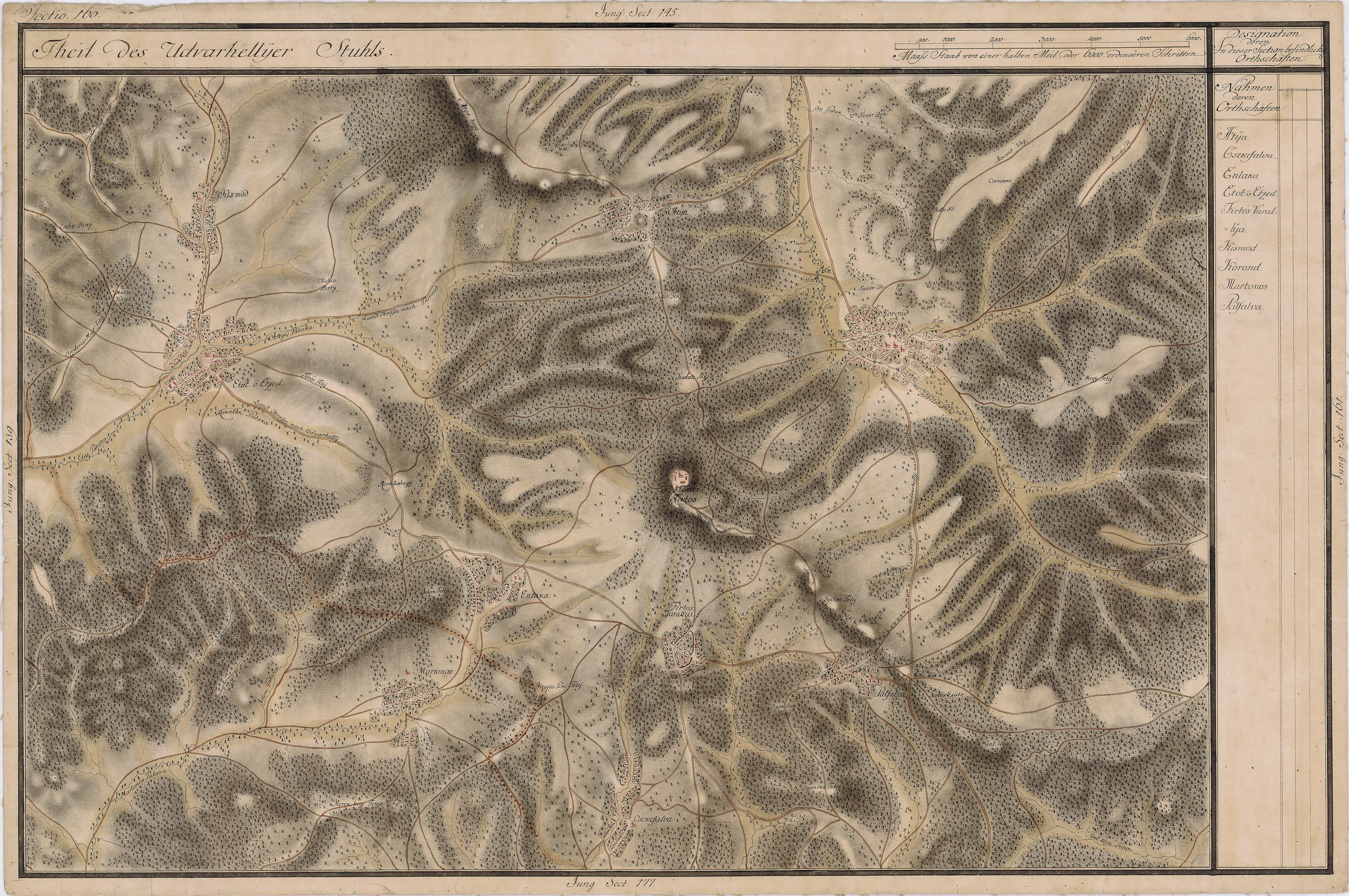
18th century map

The village historically formed part of the Székely Land region of Transylvania province. It belonged to Udvarhelyszék, then, from 1876 until 1918, to Udvarhely County in the Kingdom of Hungary. After World War I, by the terms of the Treaty of Trianon of 1920, it became part of Romania. As a result of the Second Vienna Award, it was ceded to Hungary between 1940 and 1944. After World War II, it came under Romanian administration and became part of Romania in 1947. Between 1952 and 1960, it formed part of the Hungarian Autonomous Province, then, of the Mureș-Hungarian Autonomous Province until it was abolished in 1968. Since then, the commune has been part of Harghita County.

== Demographics ==
At the 2011 census, the commune had a population of 6,135; out of them, 94% were Hungarian, 2.6% were Roma and 0.3% were Romanian.

== Twin town ==
- Taksony, Hungary, 2022

== Gallery ==
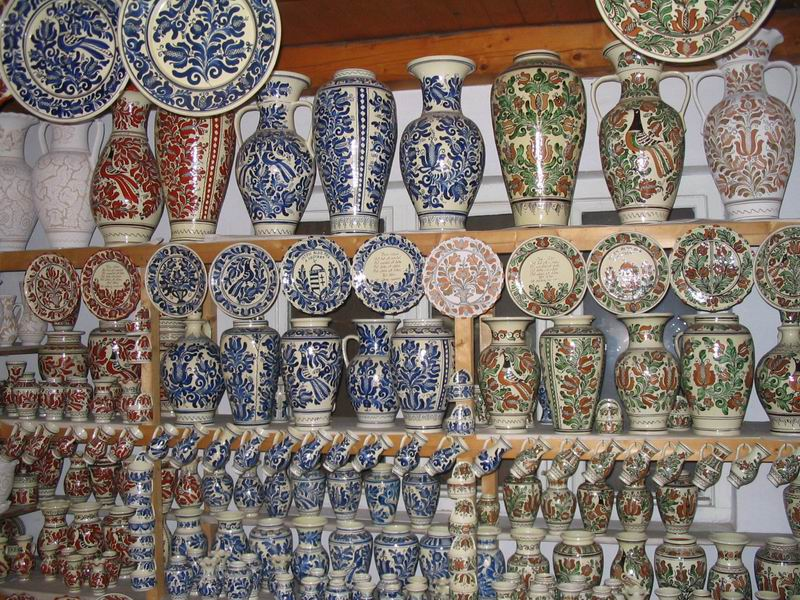
Korond pottery

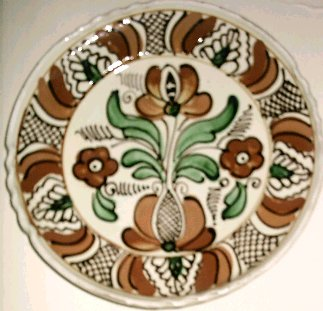
Korond plate

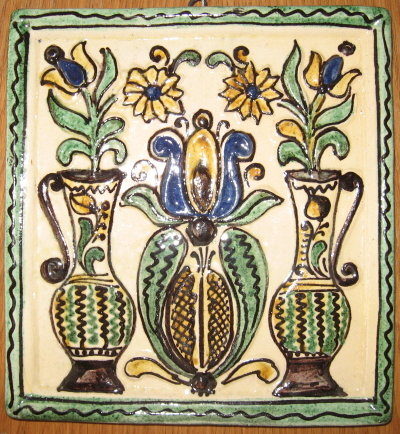
Stove tile
