= Secu =

- Commune
- Location in Romania
- Coordinates: 44°29′N 23°18′E
- Country: Romania
- County: Dolj

Government
  - Mayor (2020–2024): Victor-Marian Dan (PSD)
- Area: 27.5 km^{2} (10.6 sq mi)
- Elevation: 222 m (728 ft)
- Population (2021-12-01): 1,041
  - Density: 38/km^{2} (98/sq mi)
- Time zone: EET/EEST (UTC+2/+3)
- Postal code: 207530
- Area code: +(40) 251
- Vehicle reg.: DJ
- Website: primariasecu.ro

Secu is a commune in Dolj County, Oltenia, Romania with a population of 1,041 people as of 2021. It is composed of four villages: Comănicea, Secu, Smadovicioara de Secu, and Șumandra.
