= Bicaz Gorge =

Gorge in Romanian

Coordinates: 46.81198°N 25.81894°E

The Bicaz Gorge (Romanian: Cheile Bicazului, Hungarian: Békás-szoros) is a gorge in northeast Romania, in Neamț and Harghita counties. It is in the central part of the Hășmaș Mountains, and is part of the Cheile Bicazului-Hășmaș National Park.

The gorge was excised by the waters of the river Bicaz and is a passageway between the Romanian provinces of Moldova and Transylvania.

National road DN12C runs through the gorge along the 8 kilometres (5 mi) of ravines. Also in the gorge is Lacul Roșu (the Red Lake).

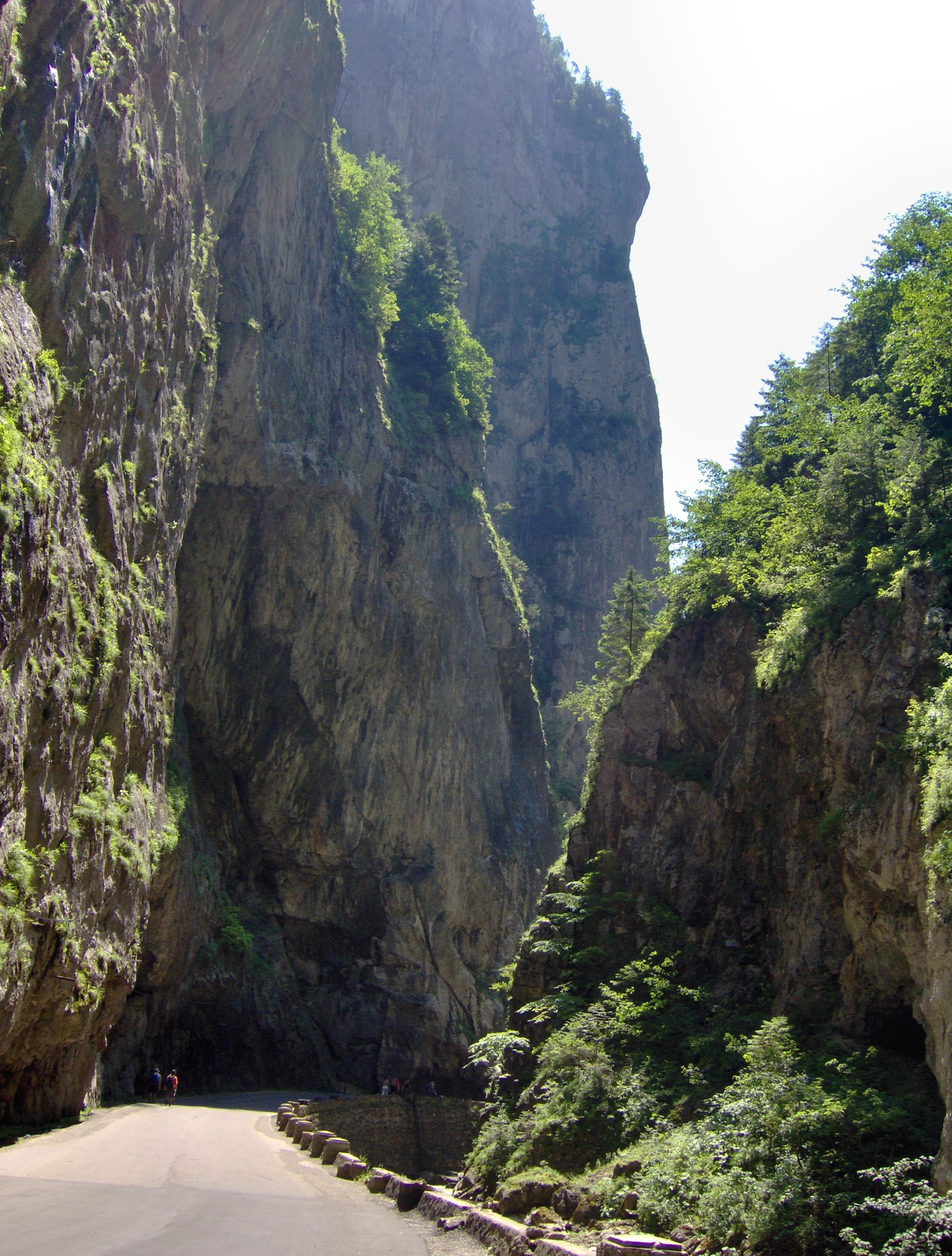

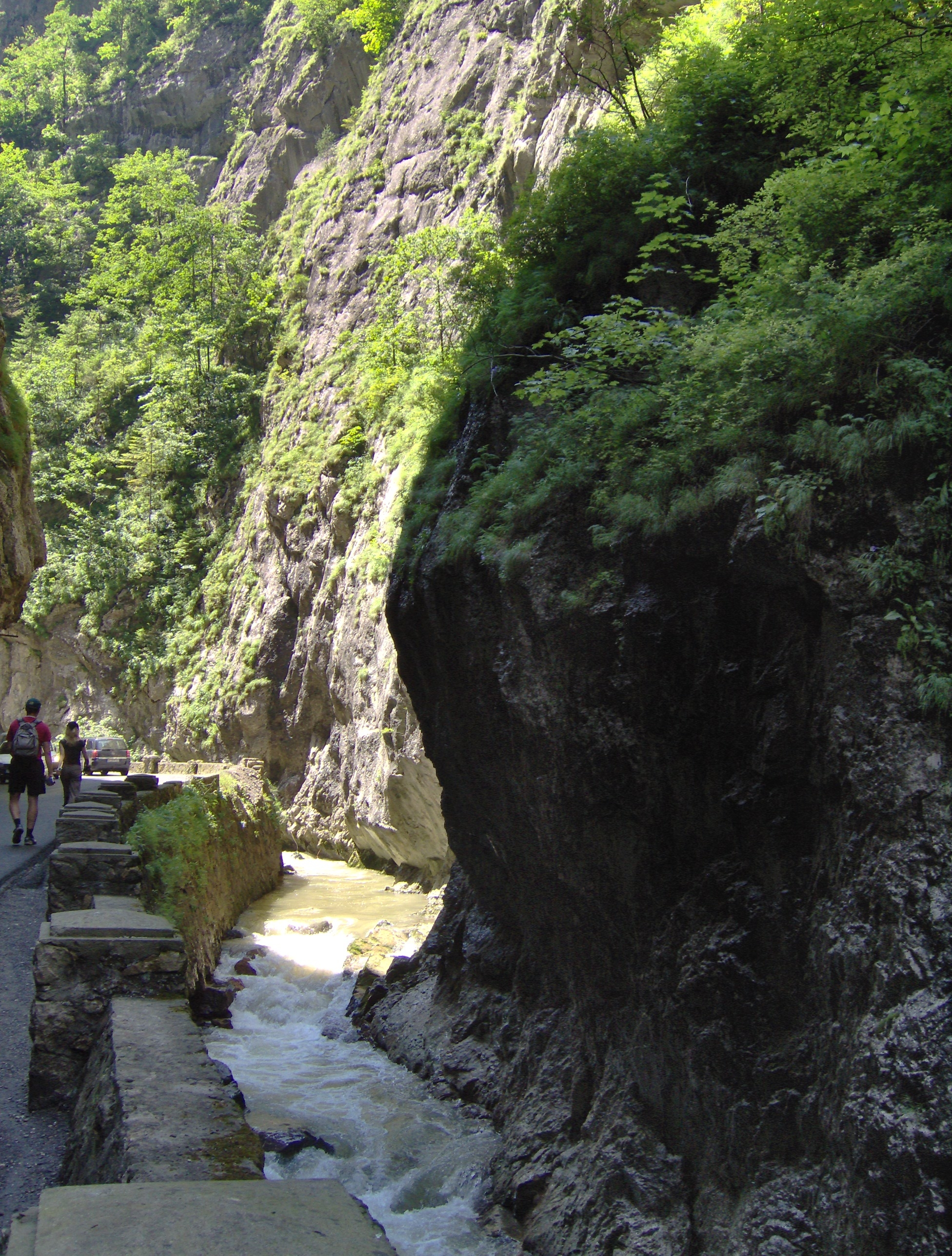

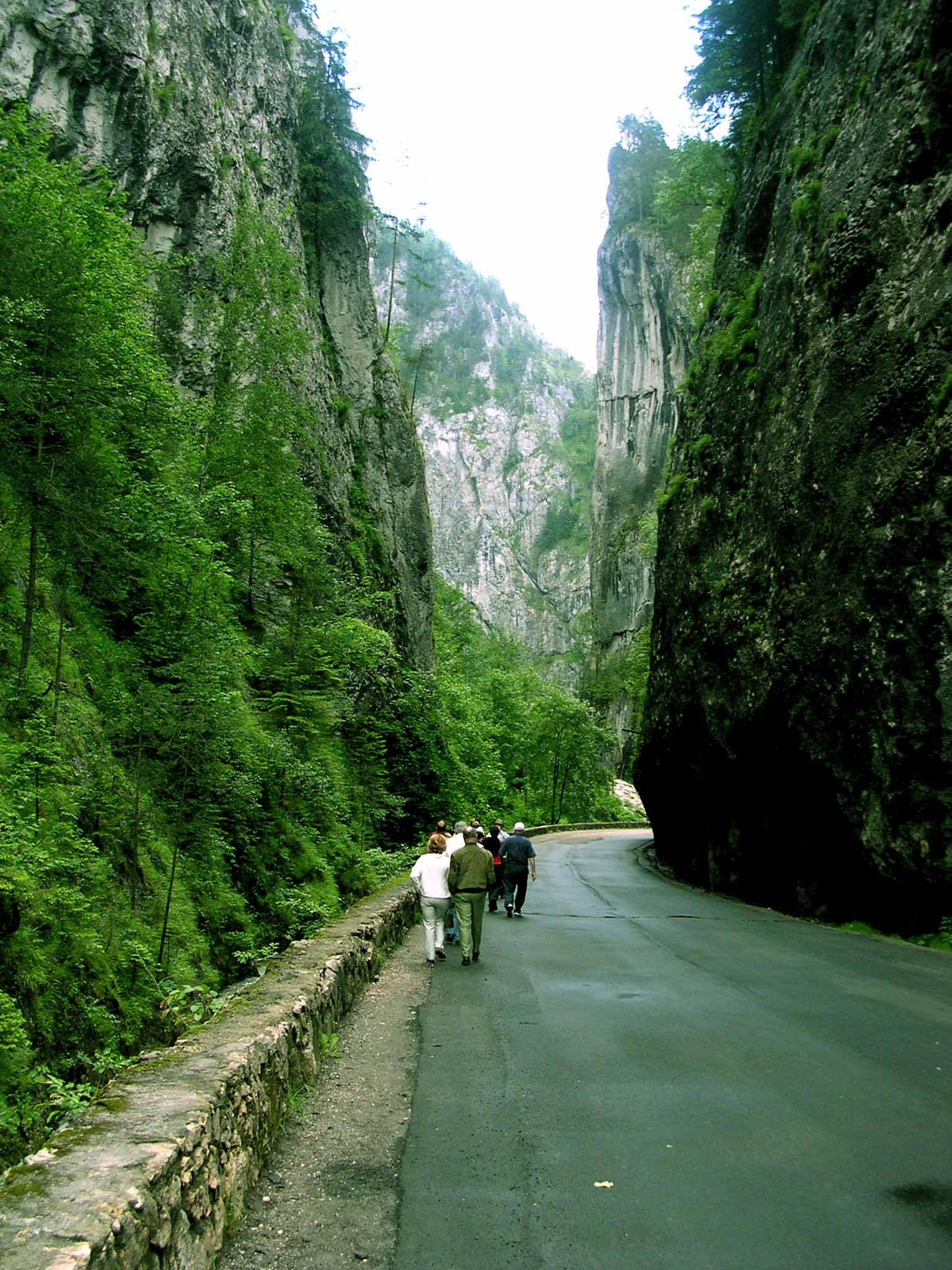

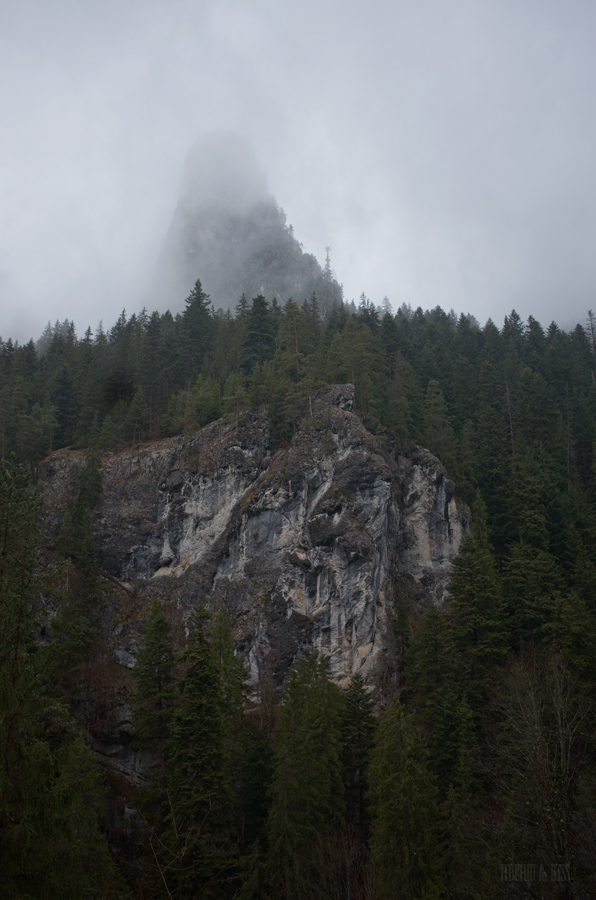

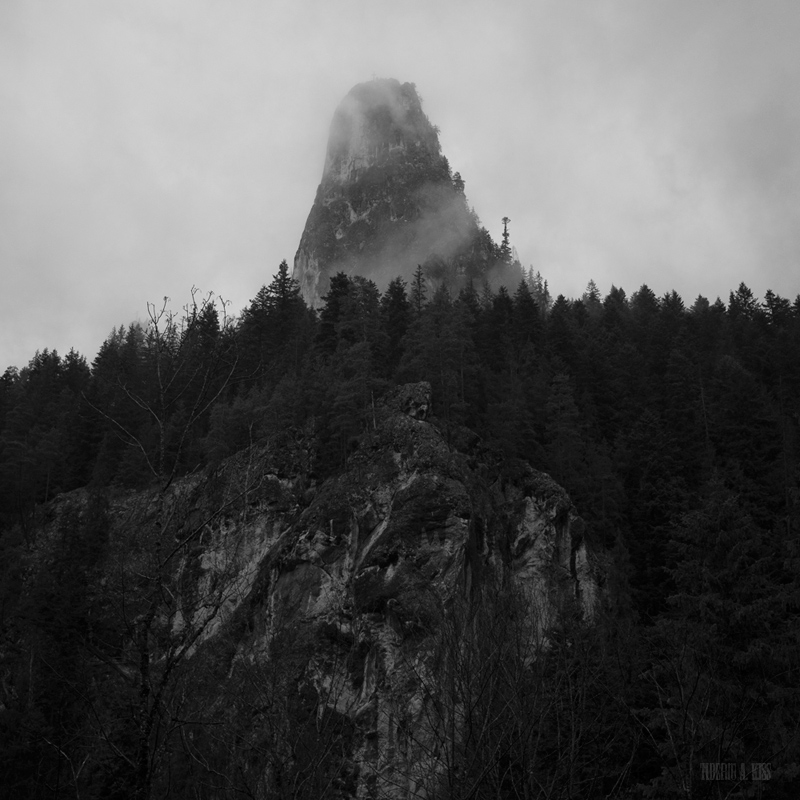

== See also ==
- Bicaz
- Cheile Bicazului-Hășmaș National Park
- Lacu Roşu
- Cheile Turzii
- Tourism in Romania
