= AGAS =

Agas or AGAS may refer to:

- Agăș, a commune in Bacău County, Romania
- Agăș River, Romania
- Amino-acid N-acetyltransferase, an enzyme
- Neoabietadiene synthase, an enzyme
- Ralph Agas (1540–1621), English land surveyor
- Agas operations, Australian reconnaissance commandos operations in Borneo during World War II
- Agha (Ottoman Empire)
