= Izvorul Negru (Uz) =

- Location within Romania

Location
- Country: Romania
- Counties: Bacău County
- Villages: Sălătruc

Physical characteristics
- Mouth: Uz
  - coordinates: 46.3549°N 26.4441°E
- Length: 16 km (9.9 mi)
- Basin size: 31 km^{2} (12 sq mi)

Basin features
- Progression: Uz→ Trotuș→ Siret→ Danube→ Black Sea

The Izvorul Negru is a right tributary of the river Uz in Romania. It discharges into the Uz in Sălătruc near Dărmănești. Its length is 16 km (9.9 mi) and its basin size is 31 km^{2} (12 sq mi).
