= Balca =

Balca may refer to:

- Balca, Bayburt, a village in the district of Bayburt, Bayburt Province, Turkey
- Bâlca, a village in the commune Coțofănești, Bacău County, Romania
- Bâlca, a tributary of the Trotuș in Bacău County, Romania
