= Câmp (river) =

- Location within Romania

Location
- Country: Romania
- Counties: Bacău County

Physical characteristics
- Mouth: Uz
  - location: Sălătruc
  - coordinates: 46.3520°N 26.4353°E
- Length: 7 km (4.3 mi)
- Basin size: 14 km^{2} (5.4 sq mi)

Basin features
- Progression: Uz→ Trotuș→ Siret→ Danube→ Black Sea

The Câmp is a left tributary of the river Uz in Romania. It flows into the Uz in Sălătruc. Its length is 7 km (4.3 mi) and its basin size is 14 km^{2} (5.4 sq mi).
