= Camenca (disambiguation) =

Camenca may refer to:

- Camenca, a town in Transnistria, Moldova
- Camenca, Glodeni, a commune in Glodeni District, Moldova
- Camenca, a village in Brusturoasa Commune, Bacău County, Romania
- Camenca, a Romanian name for Kamianka, Chernivtsi Oblast, Ukraine
- Camenca (Prut), a river in Moldova, tributary of the Prut
- Camenca (Trotuș), a river in Romania, tributary of the Trotuș
