= Anghelești =

Angheleşti may refer to several villages in Romania:

- Angheleşti, a village in Bucium, Alba
- Angheleşti, a village in Bucșani, Giurgiu
- Angheleşti, a village in Ruginești Commune, Vrancea County
