= Bașca =

- Location within Romania

Location
- Country: Romania
- Counties: Harghita County

Physical characteristics
- Mouth: Uz
  - coordinates: 46.3145°N 26.2215°E
- Length: 10 km (6.2 mi)
- Basin size: 25 km^{2} (9.7 sq mi)

Basin features
- Progression: Uz→ Trotuș→ Siret→ Danube→ Black Sea

The Bașca is a right tributary of the river Uz in Romania. It flows into the Uz upstream from Valea Uzului. Its length is 10 km (6.2 mi) and its basin size is 25 km^{2} (9.7 sq mi).
