= Secu (disambiguation) =

Secu may refer to:

Places in Romania

- Secu, a commune in Dolj County
- Secu, a village in Reșița, Caraș-Severin County
- Secu, a village in Toplița, Harghita County
- Secu, a village in Bicaz, Neamț County
- Secu, a tributary of the Bârzava in Caraș-Severin County
- Pârâul Sec, a tributary of the Neagra Broștenilor in Harghita County
- Secu, a tributary of the Popeni in Bacău County
- Secu, a tributary of the Bistrița in Neamț County
- Secu (Neamț), a tributary of the Neamț in Neamț County
- Secu, a tributary of the Botiza in Maramureș County
- Secu, a tributary of the Pogăniș in Caraș-Severin County

People

- Serghei Secu, Moldovan football manager and former footballer

Other

- State Employees Credit Union
- Contraction of Securitate, former Romanian secret police agency
- the official acronym for the Canadian House of Commons Standing Committee on Public Safety and National Security
