= Delnița River =

Delniţa River may refer to the following rivers in Romania:

- Delnița River (Moldova) - tributary of the Moldova River
- Delnița - tributary of the Olt in Harghita County
- Delnița River (Sulța) - tributary of the Sulța River

== See also ==
- Delnița (disambiguation)
