= Apa Mare =

Apa Mare may refer to:

- Apa Mare (Bega) or Vâna Ciurei River or Apa Neagră River, a tributary of the Bega Veche in western Romania
- Apa Mare, a tributary of the Apa Lină in Harghita County, Romania
