= Țiganca River =

Țiganca River may refer to:

- Țiganca, a tributary of the Gelug in Caraș-Severin County, Romania
- Țiganca River (Siret), in Neamț County, Romania
- Țiganca, a tributary of the Bărzăuța in Covasna and Bacău Counties, Romania
