= Ugra River =

Ugra River may refer to

- Ugra River (Oka), a river in Russia, tributary of the Oka River
- Ugra River (Trotuș), a river in Romania, tributary of the Trotuş River
