= Apa Lină =

- Location within Romania

Location
- Country: Romania
- Counties: Covasna, Harghita
- Villages: Cărpinenii

Physical characteristics
- Mouth: Bărzăuța
  - coordinates: 46.2349°N 26.2501°E
- Length: 15 km (9.3 mi)
- Basin size: 48 km^{2} (19 sq mi)

Basin features
- Progression: Bărzăuța→ Uz→ Trotuș→ Siret→ Danube→ Black Sea
- Tributaries
  - left: Apa Mare

The Apa Lină is a left tributary of the river Bărzăuța in Romania. It flows through the Nemira Mountains. Its length is 15 km (9.3 mi) and its basin size is 48 km^{2} (19 sq mi).
