= Apa Roșie River =

Apa Roșie River may refer to:

- Apa Roșie, another name for the upper course of the Bărzăuța in Covasna County
- Apa Roșie, a tributary of the Ozunca in Covasna County
