= PtTPS-LAS =

PtTPS-LAS may refer to:

- Levopimaradiene synthase, an enzyme
- Neoabietadiene synthase, an enzyme
