= Șugura =

- Location within Romania

Location
- Country: Romania
- Counties: Bacău County
- Villages: Buruienișu de Sus, Buruieniș

Physical characteristics
- Source: Tarcău Mountains
- Mouth: Trotuș
  - coordinates: 46.5002°N 26.2046°E
- Length: 7 km (4.3 mi)
- Basin size: 12 km^{2} (4.6 sq mi)

Basin features
- Progression: Trotuș→ Siret→ Danube→ Black Sea
- Tributaries
  - right: Târsocul Mic

The Șugura is a left tributary of the river Trotuș in Romania. It flows into the Trotuș near Agăș. Its length is 7 km (4.3 mi) and its basin size is 12 km^{2} (4.6 sq mi).
