= Iavardi =

- Location within Romania

Location
- Country: Romania
- Counties: Harghita County
- Villages: Valea Rece

Physical characteristics
- Mouth: Valea Rece
  - coordinates: 46.6228°N 25.9555°E
- Length: 8 km (5.0 mi)
- Basin size: 19 km^{2} (7.3 sq mi)

Basin features
- Progression: Valea Rece→ Trotuș→ Siret→ Danube→ Black Sea

The Iavardi is a river in Romania, right tributary of the Valea Rece. It flows into the Valea Rece in the village Valea Rece. Its length is 8 km (5.0 mi) and its basin size is 19 km^{2} (7.3 sq mi). A major feature of the river is the 7-metre-high Zógó waterfall.

The river's valley is notable for its lower Triassic limestone formations, and is regarded as one of the most beautiful valleys in the region.
