= Agăș (river) =

River in Bacău, Romania

- Location within Romania

Location
- Country: Romania
- Counties: Bacău County
- Villages: Agăș

Physical characteristics
- Source: Tarcău Mountains
- Mouth: Trotuș
  - coordinates: 46.4844°N 26.2167°E
- Length: 9 km (5.6 mi)
- Basin size: 16 km^{2} (6.2 sq mi)

Basin features
- Progression: Trotuș→ Siret→ Danube→ Black Sea

The Agăș (Hungarian: Ágas) is a left tributary of the river Trotuș in Romania. It flows into the Trotuș in the village Agăș. Its length is 9 km (5.6 mi) and its basin size is 16 km^{2} (6.2 sq mi). The Agăș is the source of the water supply system of the village of Agăș.
