= Delnița =

Delniţa may refer to several villages in Romania:

- Delniţa, a village in Păuleni-Ciuc Commune, Harghita County
- Delniţa, a village in Fundu Moldovei Commune, Suceava County

== See also ==
- Delnița River (disambiguation)
