= Lunca de Sus =

Lunca de Sus Gyimesfelsőlok
- Commune
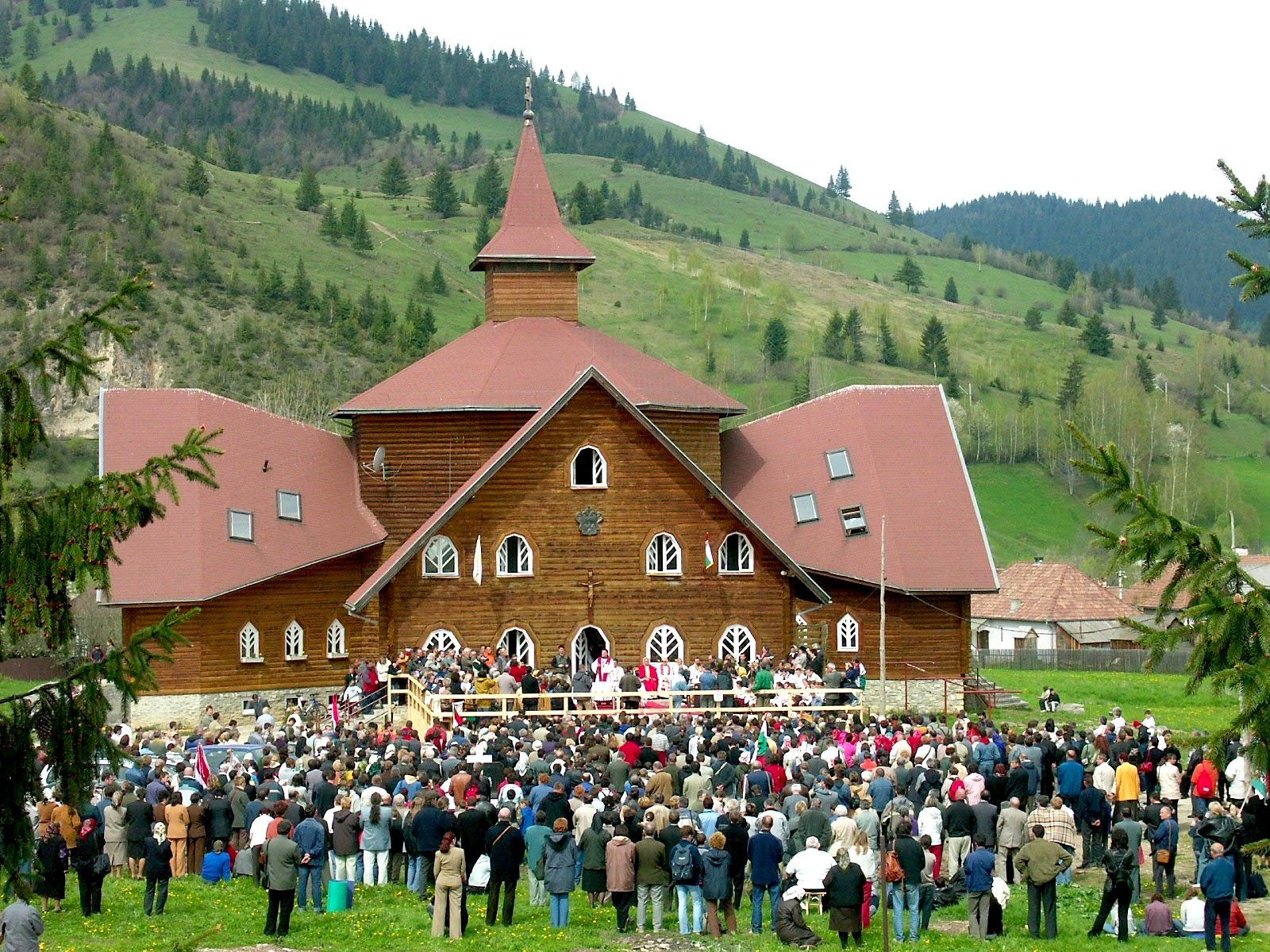
- St. Elisabeth of Hungary School, 'The House built on the Rock'

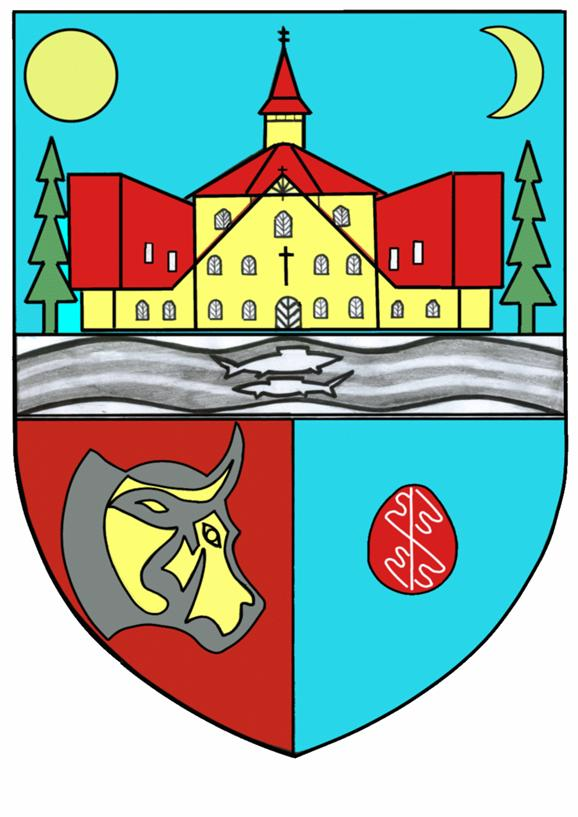
- Coat of arms

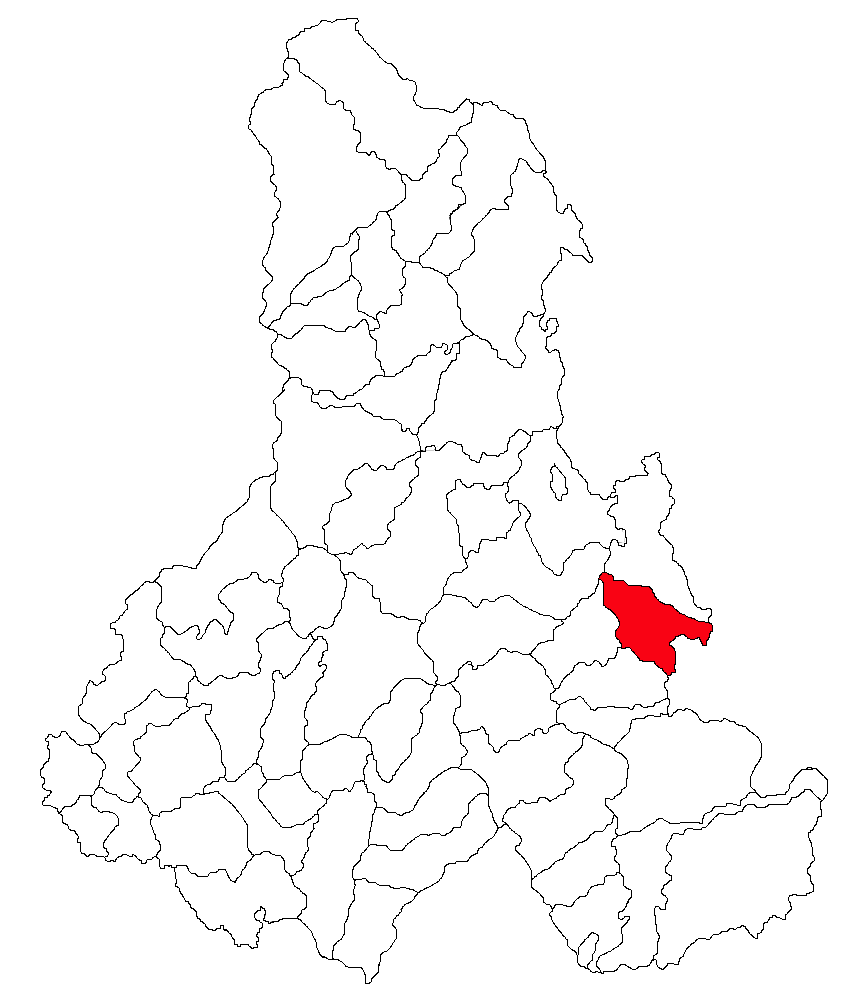
- Location in Harghita County

- Location in Romania
- Coordinates: 46°32′N 25°58′E
- Country: Romania
- County: Harghita

Government
  - Mayor (2020–2024): Imre Pap (UDMR)
- Area: 82.6 km^{2} (31.9 sq mi)
- Population (2021-12-01): 3,218
  - Density: 39.0/km^{2} (101/sq mi)
- Time zone: UTC+02:00 (EET)
  - Summer (DST): UTC+03:00 (EEST)
- Postal code: 537155
- Area code: +40 266
- Vehicle reg.: HR
- Website: www.gyimesfelsolok.ro

Lunca de Sus (Hungarian: Gyimesfelsőlok; Hungarian pronunciation: [ˈɟimɛʃfɛlʃøːlok] or colloquially Felsőlok) is a commune in Harghita County, Romania. It lies in the Szekely Land, an ethno-cultural region in eastern Transylvania.

== Component villages ==
The commune is composed of six villages:

In Romanian	In Hungarian
Comiat	Komjátpataka
Izvorul Trotușului	Sántatelek
Lunca de Sus	Gyimesfelsőlok
Păltiniș-Ciuc	Nyíresalja
Valea Gârbea	Görbepataka
Valea Ugra	Ugrapataka

Izvorul Trotușului also includes Ciherek-pataka, Bothavas-pataka and Farkas-pataka, while the Lunca de Sus village also includes Nyíresalja and Libaváros ("Goose-city").

== History ==
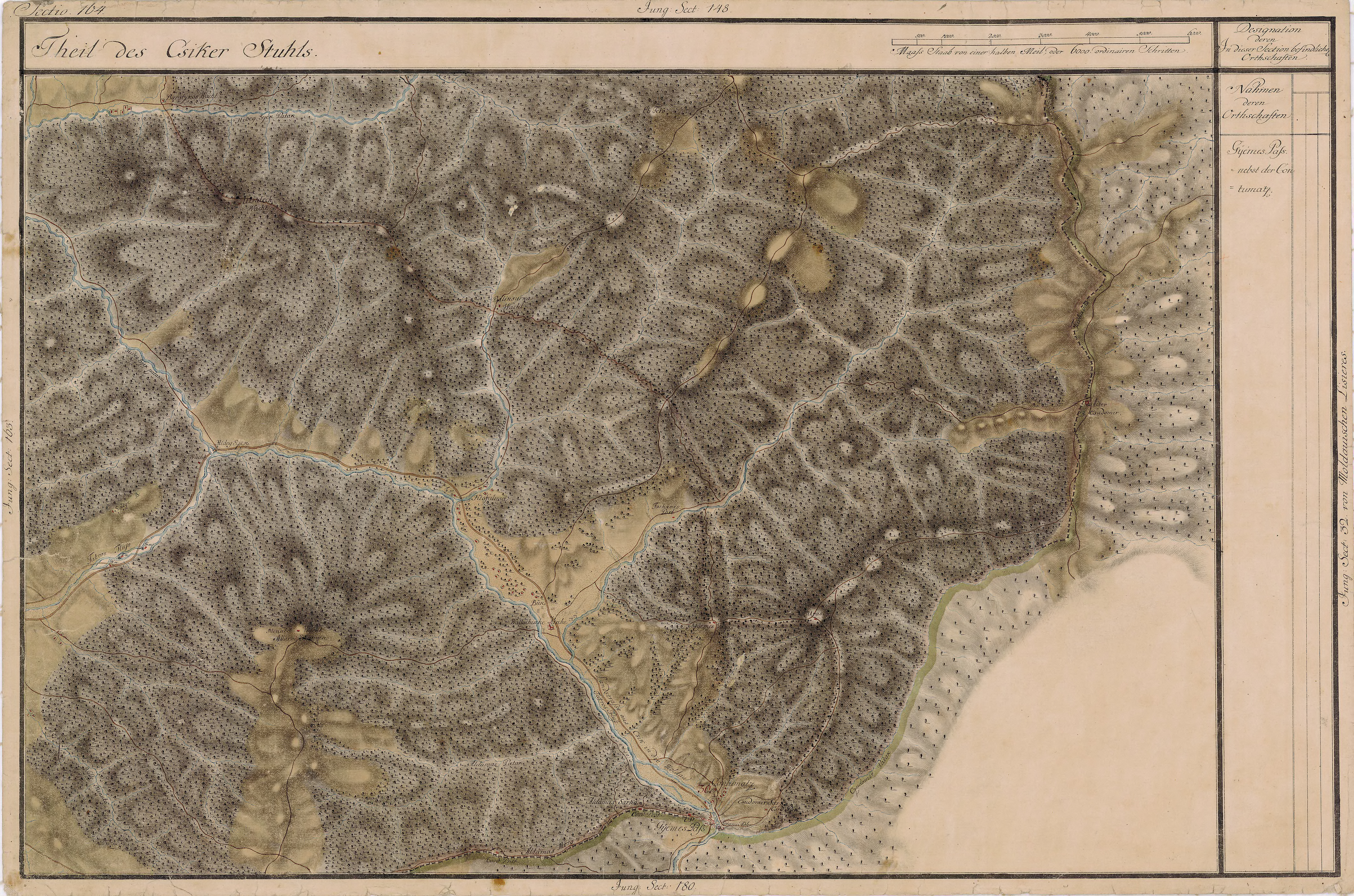
Joseph II's Military Map 1769-73

The settlement came into being out of the outer areas of Szépvíz and Csíkszentmihály villages, but became a separate village only as late as around 1850.

The village is situated near the old Hungarian border, and therefore protection had to be provided. The Tartar invasions through the valley left many victims behind. In the end, in 1701–1702, the construction of a moat was commenced on Csapó-hill next to the village. The traces of the earthworks can still be seen these days at a length of 120–150 meters.

According to the tradition, the first family that settled into the valley was the Tankó-family.

The village administratively belonged to Csíkszék, then, from 1876 until 1918 to the Csík County in the Kingdom of Hungary. After World War I, by the terms of the Treaty of Trianon of 1920, it became part of Romania. As a result of the Second Vienna Award, it belonged to Hungary again between 1940 and 1944. After World War II, it came under Romanian administration and became part of Romania in 1947. Between 1952 and 1960, it formed part of the Magyar Autonomous Region, then, of the Mureș-Hungarian Autonomous Province until it was abolished in 1968. Since then, the commune has been part of Harghita County.

== Demographics ==
At the 2011 census, the commune had a population of 3,242; out of them, 97% were Hungarian and 1.0% were Romanian. 98% of the commune population are Roman Catholic, 0.5% are Orthodox and 0.2% are Reformed.

== Geography ==
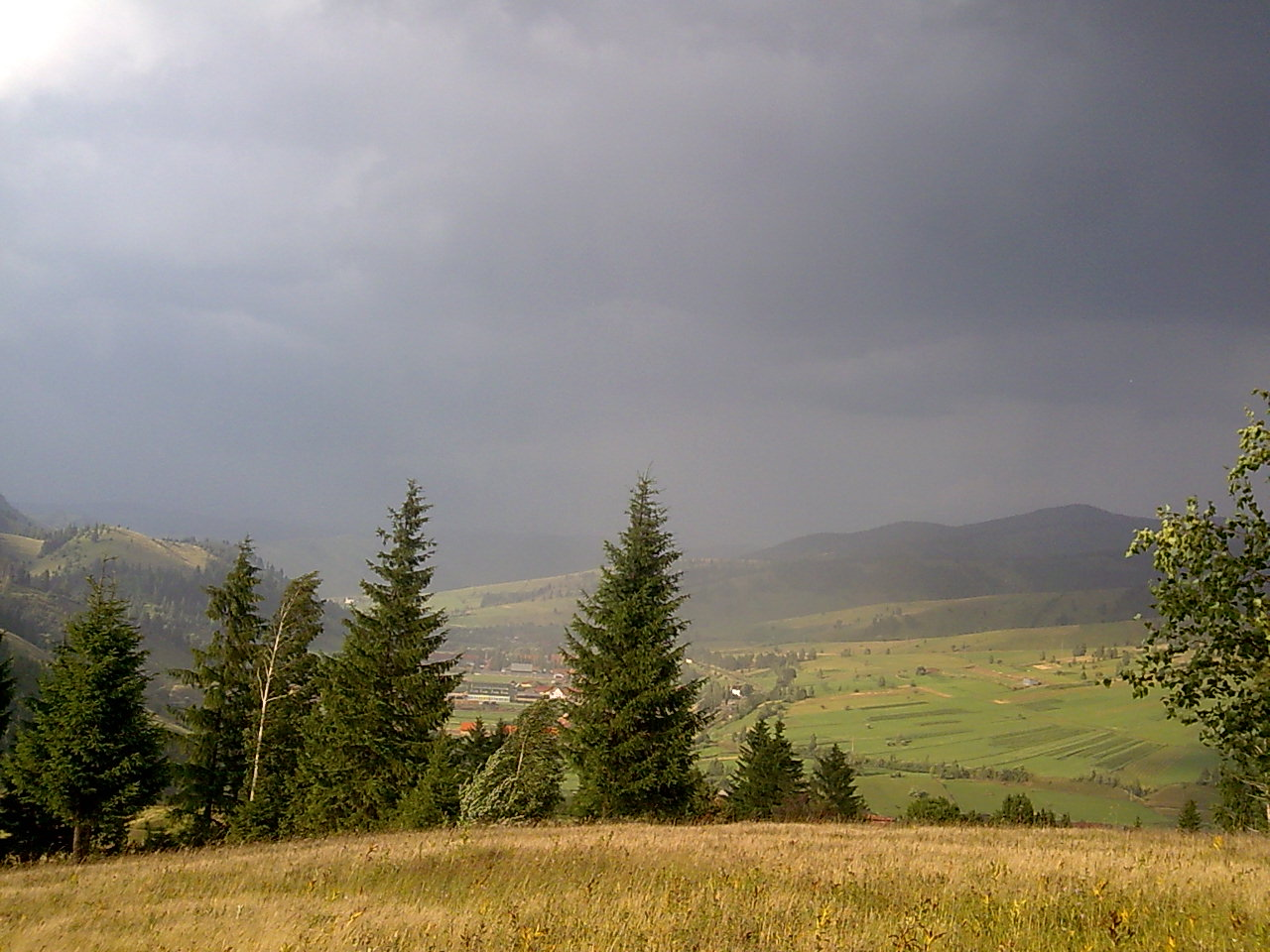
The village from the Őrhegy ('Guardhill')

The village is the first of the three Csángó settlements as the Gyimes Valley (Valea Ghimeşului) descends from its head.

It lies along the Trotuş River and its tributaries as the sub-settlements, the "creeks" (Hungarian: patakok), were formed in the valleys of the tributaries.

=== Stream regulation ===
With financial support of the European Union became completed by November 2009 the stream regulation and flood control works on Gârbea Creek. The regulation was said to be necessary as the water catchment area of the stream is large and the bed quickly filled up with rainwater with at times of rains which flooded from time to time the plots and the public road along the stream. Under the stream regulation works a 1400 meter long section of the stream has been embedded in a 2 m wide and 2.5 meter deep concrete bed. The bottom of the bed has also been covered with stones and concrete. Wide wooden bridges with yellow metal rails have been made by the brookside making easier the access by vehicle to the real estates along the river. The road has been fitted with metal railings used at motorways.

Although for most of the year, only water a few inches deep trickles in the stream, experts of the Water Department of Bacău County considered that prevention of sudden floodings of the stream may only be solved by converting it into a drainage channel. According to environmentalists, life of birds, fish, frogs and other species is affected by the concrete stream-bed solution. The mayor's office and the local population, however, is satisfied with the chosen solution and consider it a sign of progress. Besides, as they say, life already died out from the stream anyway because of the waste water trickling into the stream from the neighboring cesspools.

It is envisaged by local officials that the Trotuş River and some of the mountain brooks flowing into the river will also be regulated in a similar way, if the necessary financial resources are available.

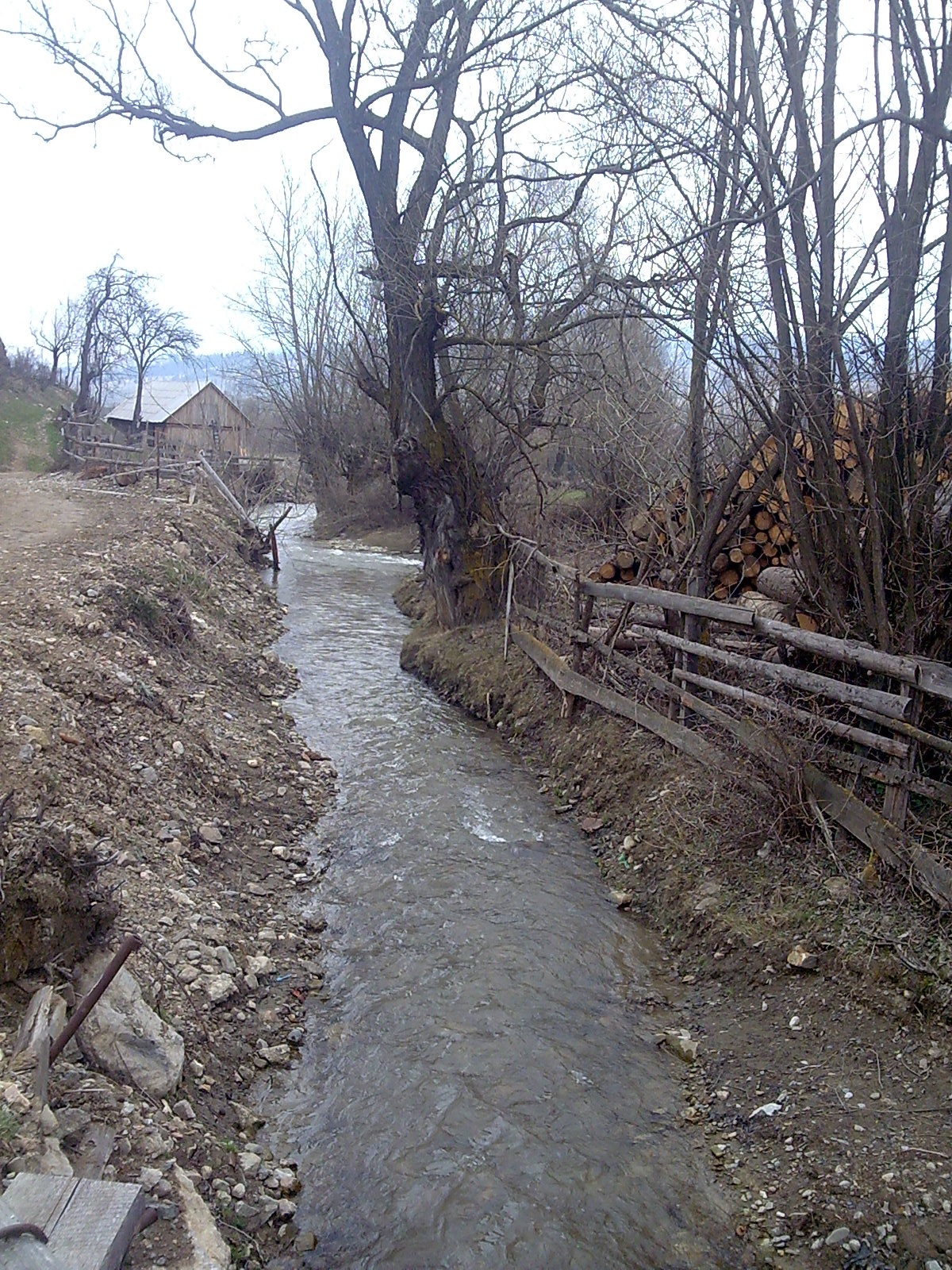
The unregulated stream

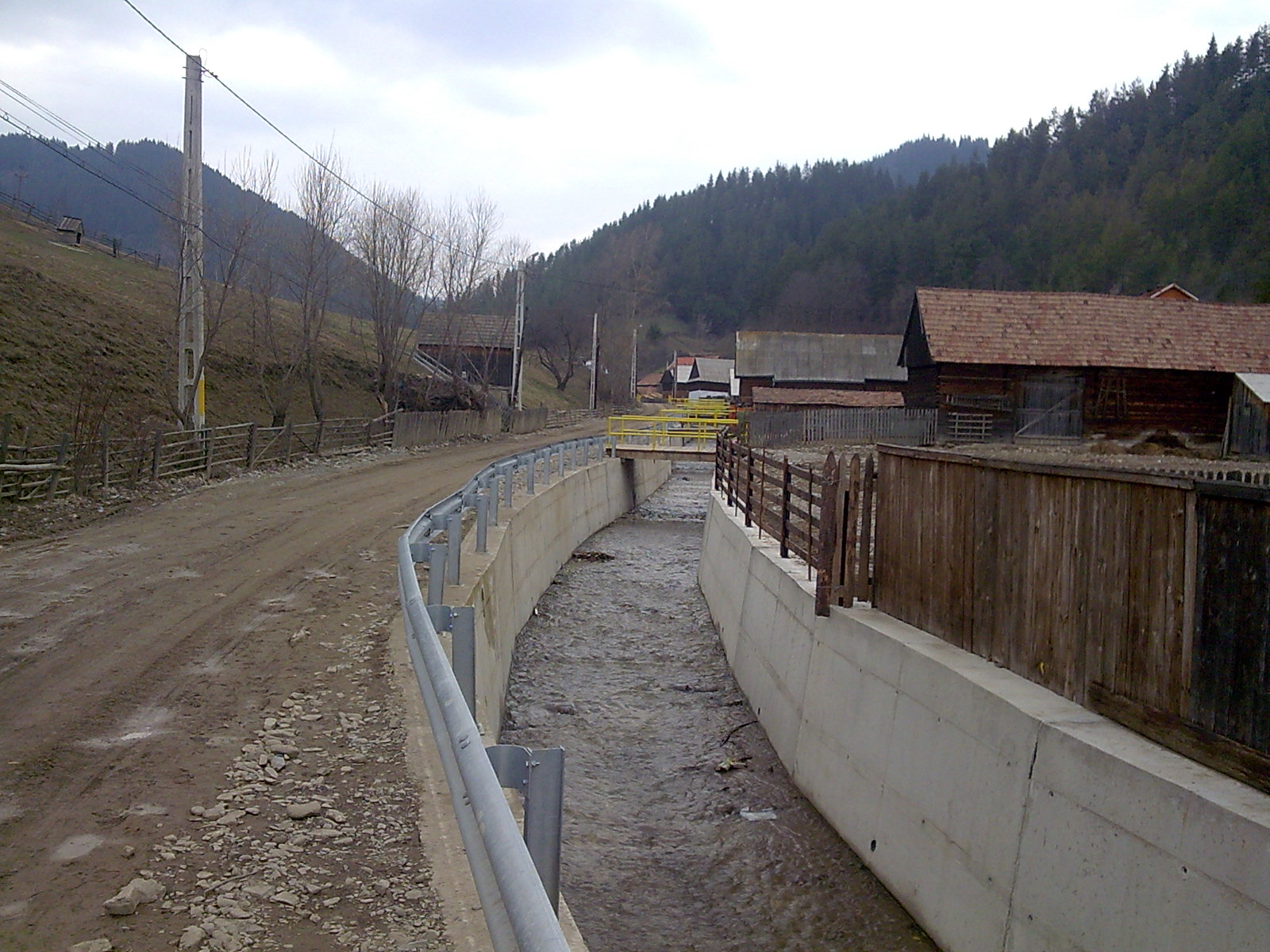
The regulated stream

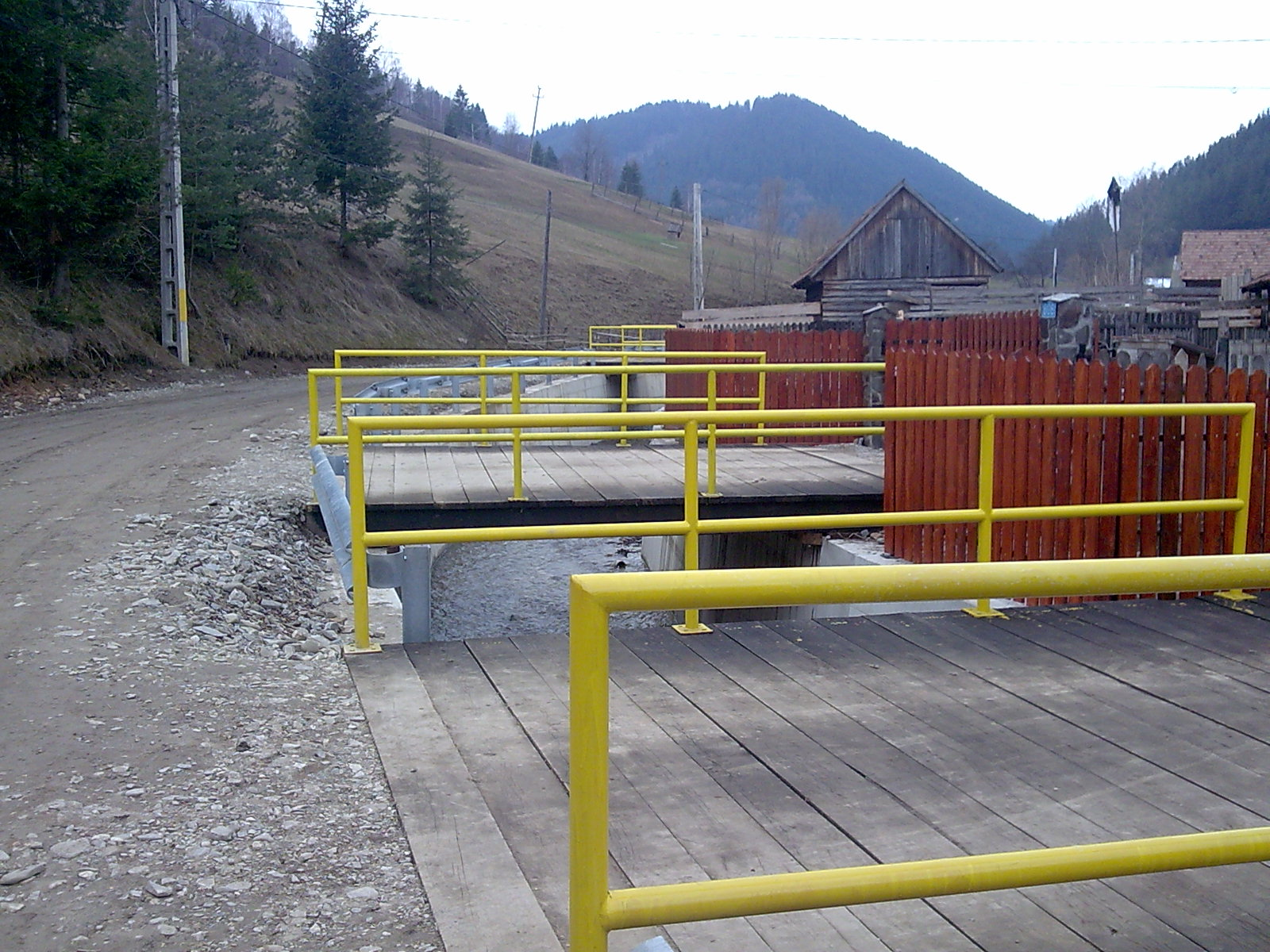
Street view from Valea Gârbea / Görbepataka

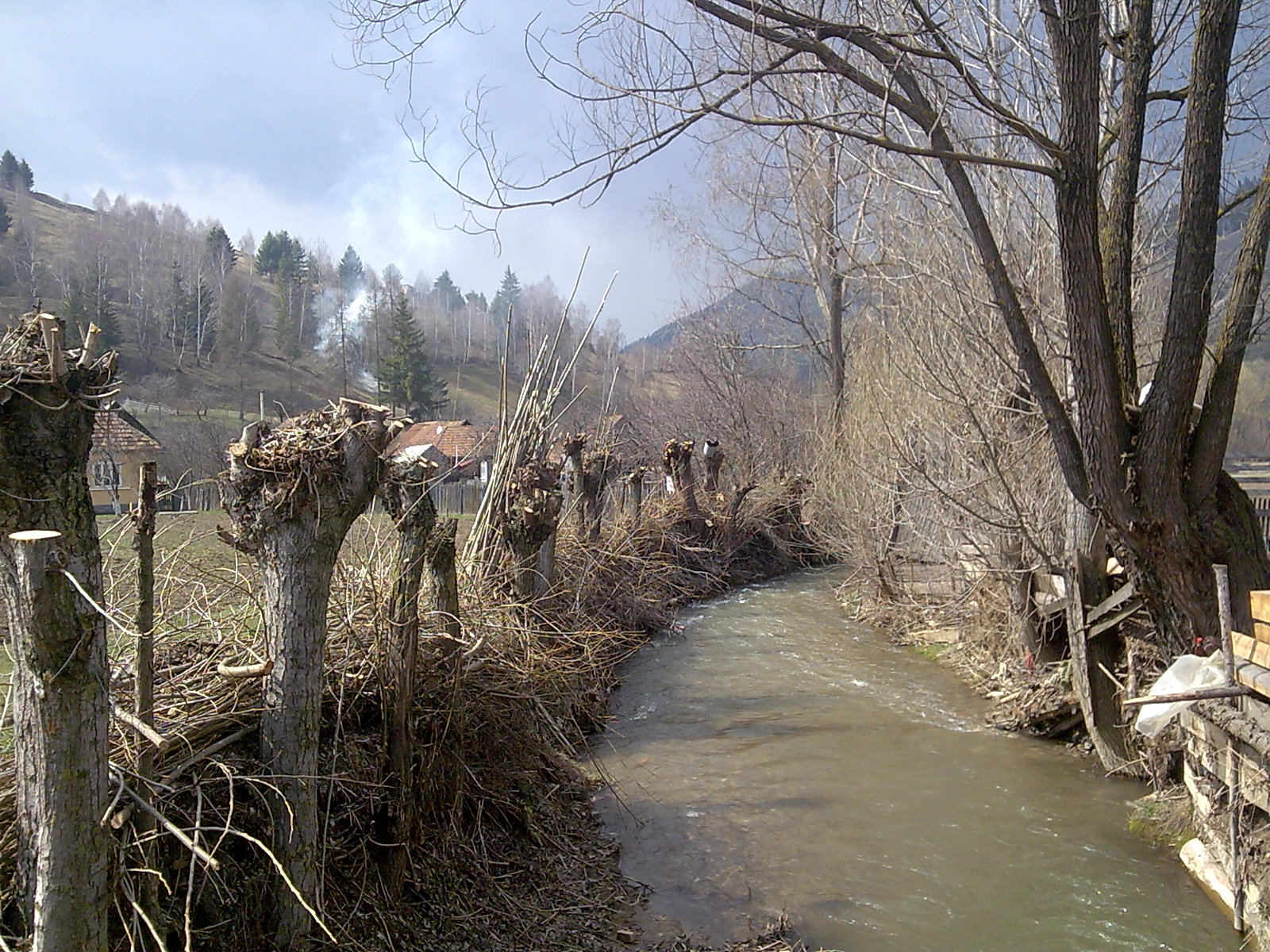
Traditional flood protection on the Trotuş River

== Education ==
Since 1994, the St. Elisabeth Catholic Grammar School has provided education not only for local students, but also for many ethnic Hungarian Csángós from Moldova. It was established by parish priest Lajos Berszán, and in the beginning the building of the Pilgrim's House named "The House built on the Rock" was used for the school's purposes.

== Tourist attractions ==
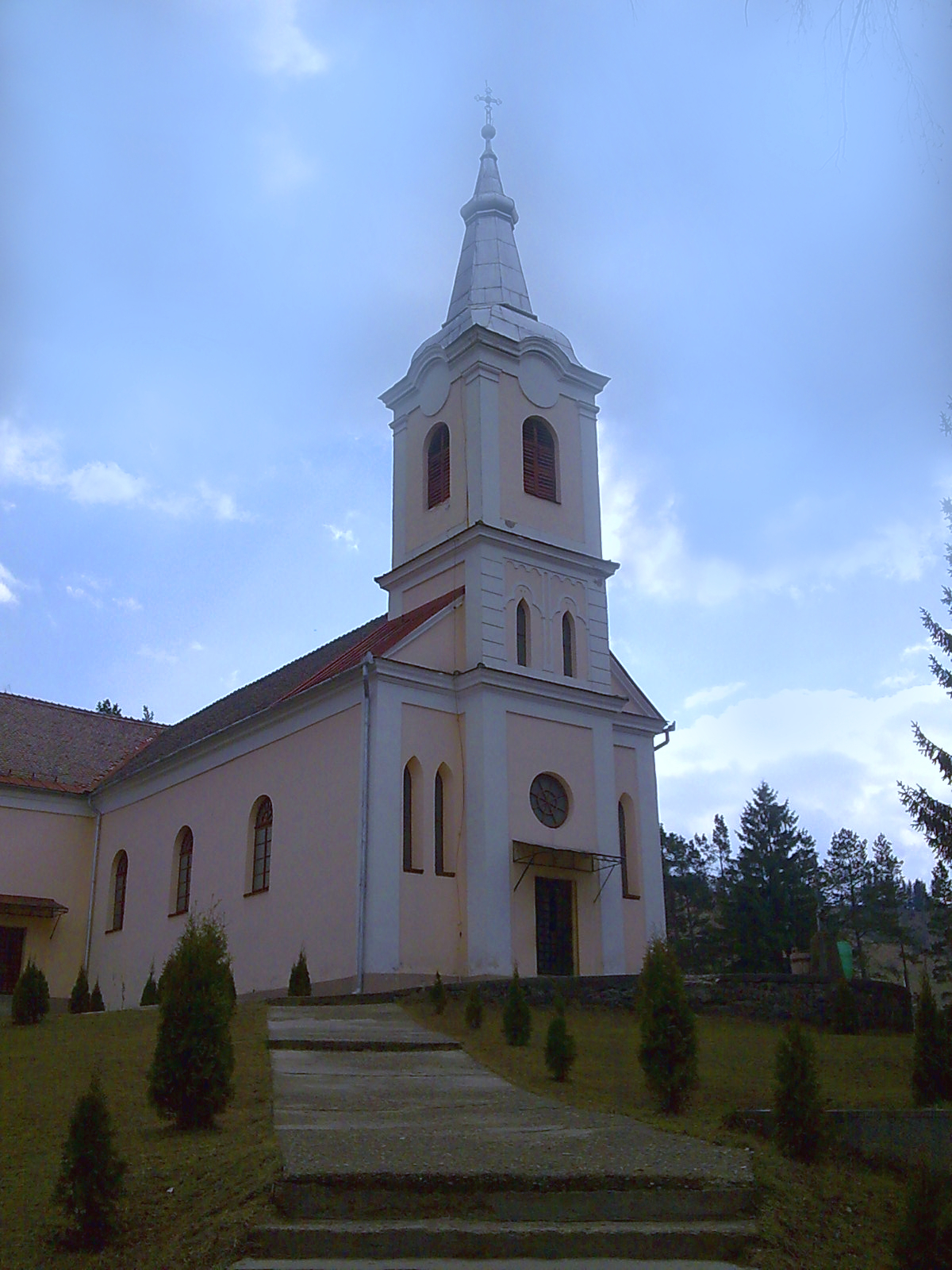
St. Andrew Parish Church

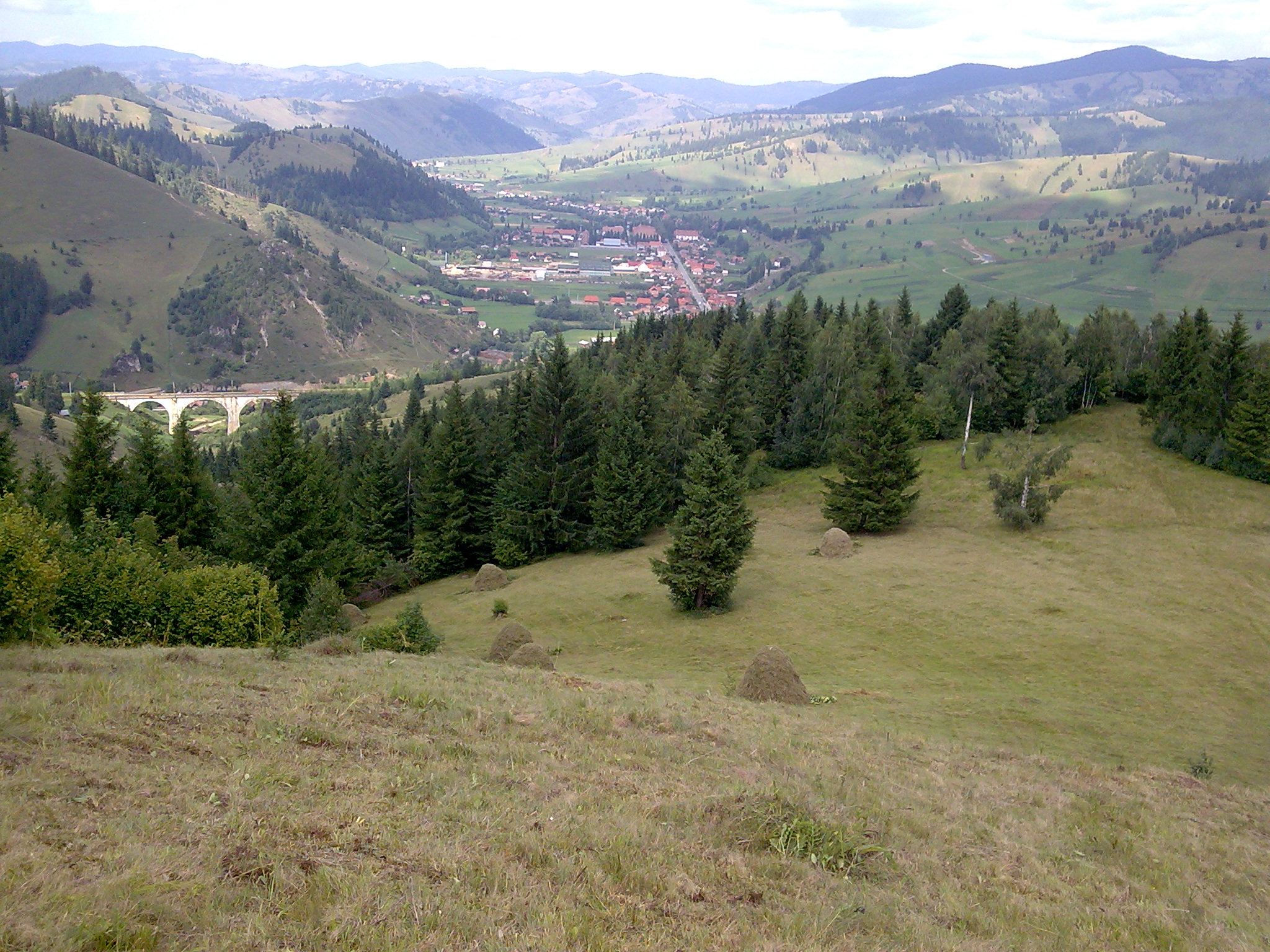
The valley from the peak Hegyes Bitkó meaning Sharp Peak

In 1941, a military complex consisting of barracks and officer houses was built by the Hungarian army, based on the plans of architect István Mátyás. The buildings were built of stones and logs in the style of a mountain rest-house and provide a picturesque sight along the main road. The complex, referred to as by locals as the "colony" ("kolónia"), later served as a prison and is now used by the Romanian military.

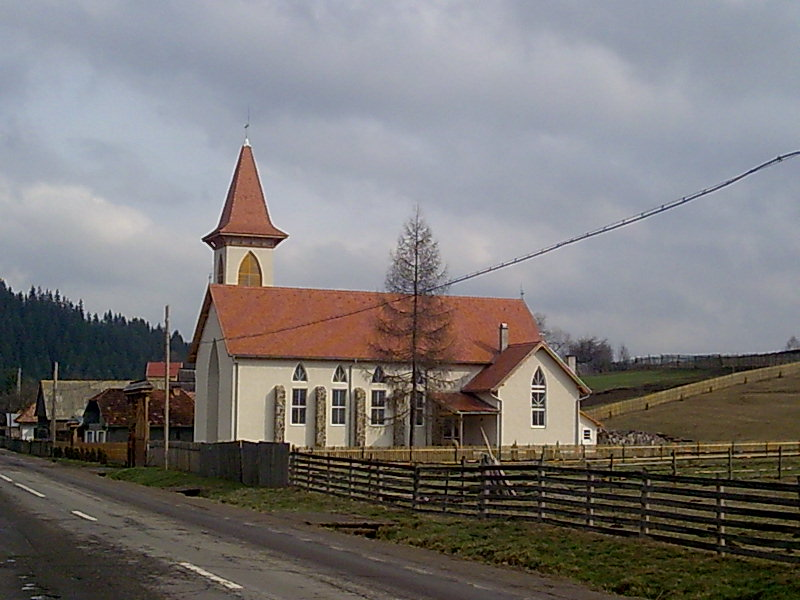
Our Lady of the Mount Carmel Church

The parish of the village is named in the honor of St Andrew, the apostle. In 2009, a chapel was built in Comiat by parish priest Géza Tankó.

Catholic pilgrims gather each year in the village and embark on the Pentecost Pilgrimage, held since 1567, with the Franciscan Church in Şumuleu Ciuc as their destination.
