= Sulța =

- Location within Romania

Location
- Country: Romania
- Counties: Bacău County
- Villages: Coșnea, Sulța

Physical characteristics
- Source
  - elevation: 1,300 m (4,300 ft)
- Mouth: Trotuș
  - location: Sulța
  - coordinates: 46.4730°N 26.2480°E
  - elevation: 525 m (1,722 ft)
- Length: 26 km (16 mi)
- Basin size: 118 km^{2} (46 sq mi)

Basin features
- Progression: Trotuș→ Siret→ Danube→ Black Sea

The Sulța is a right tributary of the river Trotuș in Romania. It discharges into the Trotuș in the village Sulța. Its length is 26 km (16 mi) and its basin size is 118 km^{2} (46 sq mi).

== Tributaries ==
The following rivers are tributaries to the river Sulța:

- Left: Morăreni, Valea Lupului, Hotar, Cotumbița
- Right: Delnița, Pietrosul, Burda, Agărașul, Burda Nouă, Cristeșul, Șolintari (or Cărunta)
