= Domoșița =

- Location within Romania

Location
- Country: Romania
- Counties: Bacău, Vrancea
- Villages: Anghelești, Ruginești

Physical characteristics
- Mouth: Trotuș
  - coordinates: 46.0772°N 27.1752°E
- Length: 20 km (12 mi)
- Basin size: 61 km^{2} (24 sq mi)

Basin features
- Progression: Trotuș→ Siret→ Danube→ Black Sea

The Domoșița is a right tributary of the river Trotuș in Romania. It discharges into the Trotuș in Văleni, near Adjud. Its length is 20 km (12 mi) and its basin size is 61 km^{2} (24 sq mi).
