= Căiuți (river) =

- Location within Romania

Location
- Country: Romania
- Counties: Bacău County
- Villages: Căiuți

Physical characteristics
- Mouth: Trotuș
  - location: Căiuți
  - coordinates: 46.1941°N 26.9369°E
- Length: 14 km (8.7 mi)
- Basin size: 28 km^{2} (11 sq mi)

Basin features
- Progression: Trotuș→ Siret→ Danube→ Black Sea

The Căiuți is a right tributary of the river Trotuș in Romania. It discharges into the Trotuș in the village Căiuți. Its length is 14 km (8.7 mi) and its basin size is 28 km^{2} (11 sq mi).
