= Valea Rece (Trotuș) =

Valea Rece Hidegség
- Location within Romania

Location
- Country: Romania
- Counties: Harghita, Bacău
- Villages: Răchitiș, Poiana Fagului, Valea Rece, Lunca de Jos

Physical characteristics
- Mouth: Trotuș
  - coordinates: 46.5890°N 26.0070°E
- Length: 23 km (14 mi)
- Basin size: 121 km^{2} (47 sq mi)

Basin features
- Progression: Trotuș→ Siret→ Danube→ Black Sea
- Tributaries
  - right: Aprieș, Poiana Fagului, Iavardi, Sălămaș

The Valea Rece (Hungarian: Hidegség-pataka, meaning Coldness Creek) is a left tributary of the river Trotuș in Romania. It discharges into the Trotuș in Făgetu de Sus. Its length is 23 km (14 mi) and its basin size is 121 km^{2} (47 sq mi).
