= Slănic (Trotuș) =

Romanian river

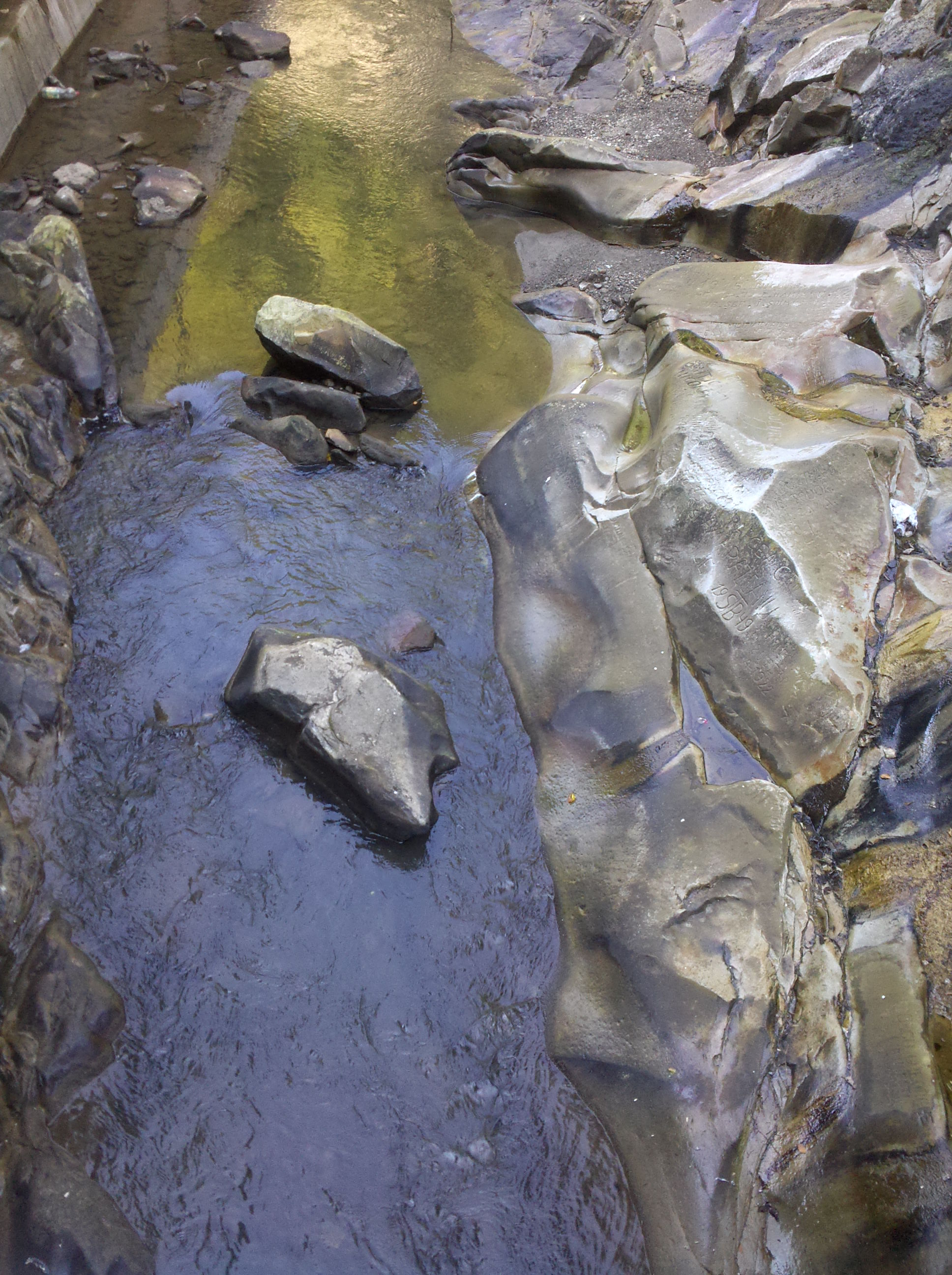

- Location within Romania

Location
- Country: Romania
- Counties: Bacău County
- Villages: Slănic-Moldova, Cerdac

Physical characteristics
- Mouth: Trotuș
  - location: Târgu Ocna
  - coordinates: 46.2770°N 26.6038°E
- Length: 28 km (17 mi)
- Basin size: 126 km^{2} (49 sq mi)

Basin features
- Progression: Trotuș→ Siret→ Danube→ Black Sea
- Tributaries
  - left: Slănicel, Pufu, Piatra
  - right: Dobru

The Slănic is a right tributary of the river Trotuș in Romania. It discharges into the Trotuș in Târgu Ocna. Its length is 28 km (17 mi) and its basin size is 126 km^{2} (49 sq mi).
