= Caminca =

Caminca Camenca
- Location within Romania

Location
- Country: Romania
- Counties: Bacău County
- Villages: Camenca

Physical characteristics
- Source: Tarcău Mountains
- Mouth: Trotuș
  - location: Brusturoasa
  - coordinates: 46.5139°N 26.1865°E
- Length: 29 km (18 mi)
- Basin size: 75 km^{2} (29 sq mi)

Basin features
- Progression: Trotuș→ Siret→ Danube→ Black Sea
- Tributaries
  - left: Paloșu
  - right: Stâna, Duruitoarea, Pârâul Luncii, Dranița, Făgețel

The Caminca (also: Camenca) is a left tributary of the river Trotuș in Romania. It discharges into the Trotuș in Brusturoasa. Its length is 29 km (18 mi) and its basin size is 75 km^{2} (29 sq mi).
