= Urmeniș (Trotuș) =

- Location within Romania

Location
- Country: Romania
- Counties: Bacău County
- Cities: Moinești

Physical characteristics
- Source: Tarcău Mountains
- Mouth: Trotuș
  - coordinates: 46.4092°N 26.4606°E
- Length: 12 km (7.5 mi)
- Basin size: 38 km^{2} (15 sq mi)

Basin features
- Progression: Trotuș→ Siret→ Danube→ Black Sea
- Tributaries
  - left: Iordana

The Urmeniș is a left tributary of the river Trotuș in Romania. Its source is near Moinești, at the southern end of the Tarcău Mountains. It flows into the Trotuș in Comănești. Its length is 12 km (7.5 mi) and its basin size is 38 km^{2} (15 sq mi).
