= Jeremiah of Wallachia =

Catholic friar

Blessed Jeremiah of Wallachia OFMCap
- Born: Ioan Costişte; 29 June 1556; Târgu Trotuș, Principality of Moldavia
- Died: 26 February 1625 (aged 68); Naples, Kingdom of Naples, Crown of Aragon
- Venerated in: Roman Catholic Church (Capuchin Friars Minor & Romania)
- Beatified: 30 October 1983, Vatican City by Pope John Paul II
- Major shrine: Church of the Immacolata Concezione, Naples, Italy
- Feast: 26 February

Jeremiah of Wallachia (born 29 June 1556 - 26 February 1625) was a Romanian-born Capuchin lay brother who spent his entire adult life serving as an infirmarian of the Order in Italy. He was beatified by Pope John Paul II on 30 October 1983, the first of his nation to be so honored. Born Ion Costist or Ioan (John) Costişte, he emigrated to Naples during his adolescence. Also known as Geremia from Wallachia, he became noted for his careful attention to the merciful works and to the care of the poor. His vision of the Blessed Mother resulted in one of the best known images created of him.

== Life ==
He was born Ioan Costişte in a village in the Principality of Moldavia (Wallachia) to Margareta Bărbat and Stoica Costişte (Kostist), who were prosperous farmers. Few details have survived of his childhood and youth, other than that as a child he had developed the conviction that he wanted to go to Italy because that was where the best Christians were to be found. His mother told him it was a place "where the monks were all holy and there was the pope, the Vicar of Christ"; the fact that he was illiterate and knew his own dialect and no other language did not hinder his decision.

At the age of 19, Costişte left home with his parents' permission to carry out his dream. After a long journey during which he served as a physician's assistant, he arrived in Bari, Italy, where he settled at the age of 22. He began to serve the celebrated doctor Pietro Lo Iacono. After five years of life there, he determined that he was not finding what he sought; he was then resolved to go back home. However, on 8 May 1579 he was admitted into the novitiate of the Capuchin friars for the Province of Naples, where he was given the religious name Jeremiah on 8 May 1579. After his profession of religious vows a year later, he was assigned to a number of friaries in the province between 1579 and 1584; among those positions was in 1585 acting as a medical assistant at the Capuchin medical centre in their convent of Saint Eframo Nuovo in Naples.

In 1585, Jeremiah was assigned to the infirmary of the Monastery of St. Ephrem the Old in Naples, where he would live out the rest of his life. There he cared for the sick friars of the community, as well as for the poor and sick of the city. He seemed born for this task, becoming noted for his compassion for the suffering. For him, people were "part of the suffering Jesus and he saw them like Jesus himself". He came to serve even lepers, for whom he would prepare an herbal preparation to cover the stench of their decaying flesh. Miraculous cures began to be associated with his nursing and prayers. He also cared for the insane, becoming the sole caretaker of one friar who was so violent that he drove everyone else away. He cared for that friar for nearly five years, and later called him his "recreation". Jeremiah felt such a commitment to the poverty that is a hallmark of the Franciscan Order that he is said to have spent 35 years wearing the same habit. In a like manner, his ration of food generally went to others.

On 14 August 1608, the eve of the Feast of the Assumption, he had a vision of the Blessed Mother in which he enquired to her the reason she did not wear a crown; she responded with: "Here is my crown: my son". He confided this vision to his friend and friar Pacifico da Salerno and soon the tale spread from person to person. An artist even made an icon that depicted this event. He would refer to her as "Mammarella Nostra".

In 1625, Jeremiah, by then aged 69 years, was becoming aware of his approaching death. With that his spirit of self-sacrifice grew. On 26 February of that year, a great personage at the Spanish royal court (Torre del Greco) was seriously ill, and summoned Jeremiah to care for him. Jeremiah did not understand why he was not sent a means of transport. On a long walk from the monastery a woman tells him:

"We have to come Wednesday to the friary."
"You will have to find me."
"But where will you be?"
"I want to go to my homeland."

His return to Naples witnessed him contracting pleuropneumonia; he died of that on 5 March 1625. His final words were "Yes, Jesus, come! Thank you!" After his death he was clothed in the habit six times since the faithful snipped parts of it off for themselves as relics. He is buried in the church of the Immaculate Conception in Naples.

== Contemporary reputation ==
A particular phrase common among his peers was: "who can achieve the charity of Brother Geremia?" He was known to act on all the merciful acts both corporal and spiritual; these acted as his vision for his life and indeed the core of his own characteristics. He believed that God was merciful love but also applied this to the Trinity, the Passion of Jesus Christ, the Eucharist, the Blessed Virgin Mary and the Universal Church; he extended this with his belief that humankind was the gift of the Lord's merciful love.

Costist was known to his peers for his insightful discussions and for his natural talents at consoling those who suffered. He was perceived to radiate personal warmth and an aura of being a simple friar. He spent his nights in the cells of the ill or of other friars and even said himself that he was so poor he could not even hope to afford the rent of a cell for himself. Costist would proclaim thanks: "Lord, I thank You because I have always served and have never been served. I have always been subject and have never been commanded".

== Veneration ==
The beatification process commenced in Naples after the cause received the papal approval of Pope Urban VIII on 25 September 1627 and a move that designated the late religious with the title Servant of God as the first stage in the process. The cause for Jeremiah's beatification was started on 3 September 1687, but remained stalled until 1905, at which time a biography of his life was published in Naples, entitled Vita di Fra Geremia Valacco. In 1914 he became a topic of study by the Romanian Academy, and in 1944 Professor Grigore Manoilescu (who was an Orthodox Christian) released a short biography of him in the Romanian language, Români dăruiţi altor neamuri.

On 14 October 1947, Jeremiah was declared a Servant of God by Pope Pius XII and venerable through a proclamation of his heroic virtue issued by Pope John XXIII on 18 December 1959. He was beatified by Pope John Paul II on 30 October 1983 following the recognition of a singule miracle attributed to his intercession.
