= Bâlca =

- Location within Romania

Location
- Country: Romania
- Counties: Bacău County
- Villages: Bâlca, Coțofănești

Physical characteristics
- Mouth: Trotuș
  - coordinates: 46.1523°N 27.0122°E
- Length: 13 km (8.1 mi)
- Basin size: 40 km^{2} (15 sq mi)

Basin features
- Progression: Trotuș→ Siret→ Danube→ Black Sea
- Tributaries
  - right: Bâlca Tulbure

The Bâlca is a right tributary of the river Trotuș in Romania. It discharges into the Trotuș in Coțofănești. Its length is 13 km (8.1 mi) and its basin size is 40 km^{2} (15 sq mi).
