= Popeni (river) =

Popeni Ursoaia
- Location within Romania

Location
- Country: Romania
- Counties: Bacău County
- Villages: Popeni

Physical characteristics
- Mouth: Trotuș
  - location: Boiștea
  - coordinates: 46.1929°N 26.9587°E
- Length: 22 km (14 mi)
- Basin size: 65 km^{2} (25 sq mi)

Basin features
- Progression: Trotuș→ Siret→ Danube→ Black Sea
- Tributaries
  - right: Secul

The Popeni (also: Ursoaia) is a right tributary of the river Trotuș in Romania. It discharges into the Trotuș in Boiștea. Its length is 22 km (14 mi) and its basin size is 65 km^{2} (25 sq mi).
