= Târgu Trotuș =

- Commune
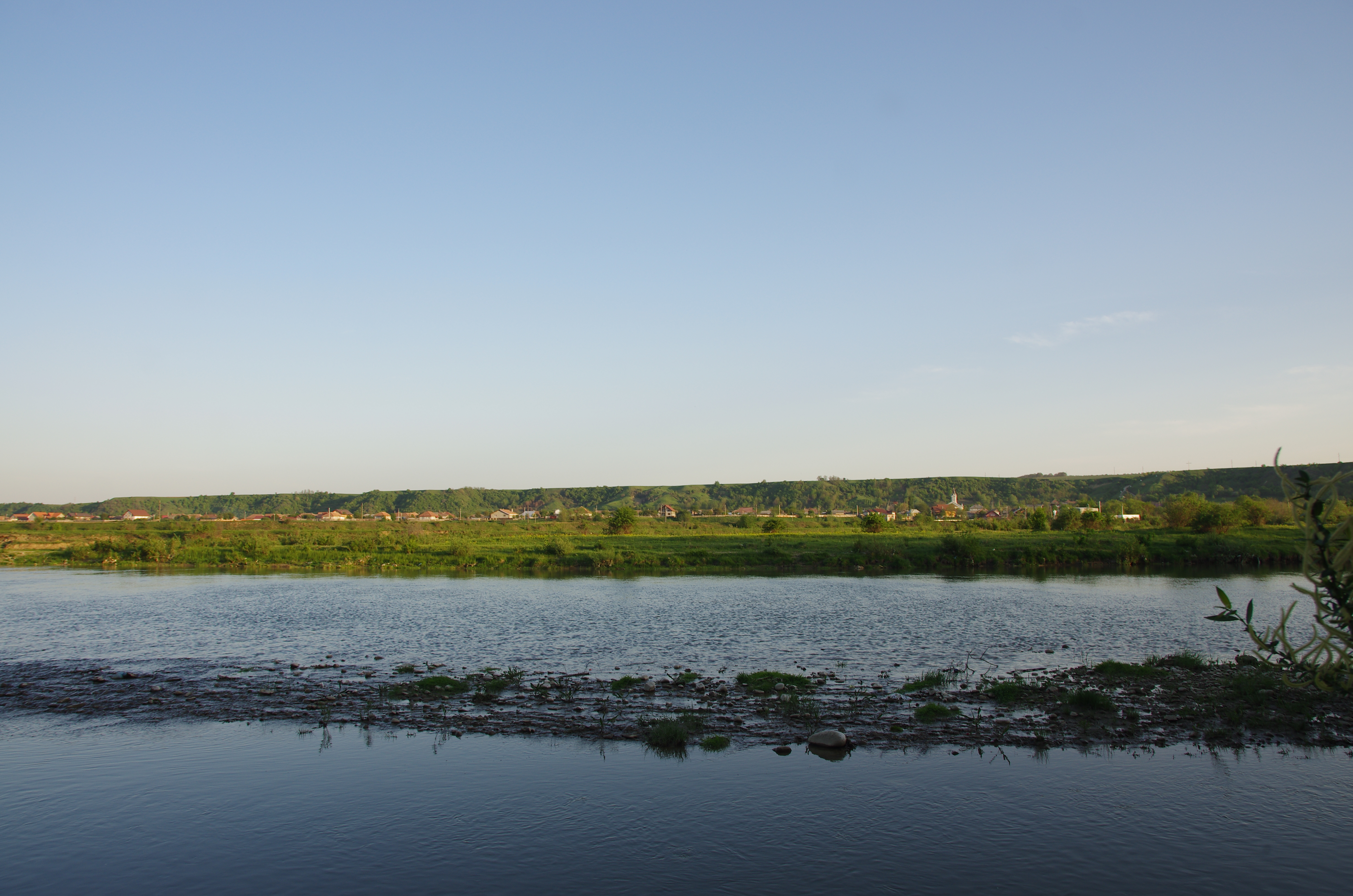
- The river Trotuș in Târgu Trotuș

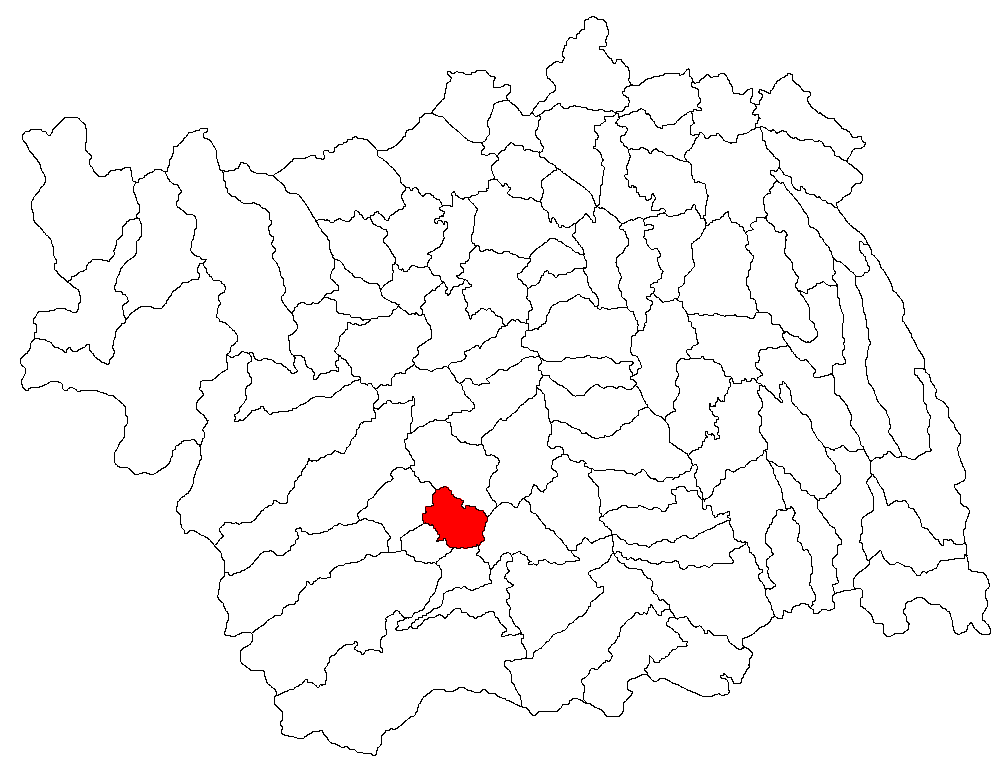
- Târgu Trotuș within Bacău County

- Location in Romania
- Coordinates: 46°16′N 26°40′E
- Country: Romania
- County: Bacău

Government
  - Mayor (2024–2028): Cătălin Sabău (PSD)
- Area: 32.1 km^{2} (12.4 sq mi)
- Elevation: 237 m (778 ft)
- Population (2021-12-01): 5,330
  - Density: 166/km^{2} (430/sq mi)
- Time zone: UTC+02:00 (EET)
  - Summer (DST): UTC+03:00 (EEST)
- Postal code: 607630
- Area code: +(40) 0234
- Vehicle reg.: BC
- Website: primariatgtrotus.ro

Târgu Trotuș (Hungarian: Tatros) is a commune in Bacău County, Western Moldavia, Romania. It is composed of three villages: Târgu Trotuș, Tuta (Diószeg), and Viișoara (Viszóra).

Historical population
Year	Pop.	±%
2002	5,354	—
2011	4,969	−7.2%
2021	5,330	+7.3%
Source: Census data

At the 2021 census, the commune had a population of 5,330, an increase from the 2011 census, when the population was 4,969. At the 2002 census, 99.9% of inhabitants were ethnic Romanians; 63.3% were Roman Catholic and 36.5% Romanian Orthodox.

== Natives ==
- Jeremiah of Wallachia (1556–1625), Capuchin lay brother
