= Sava Athanasiu =

Romanian geologist and paleontologist

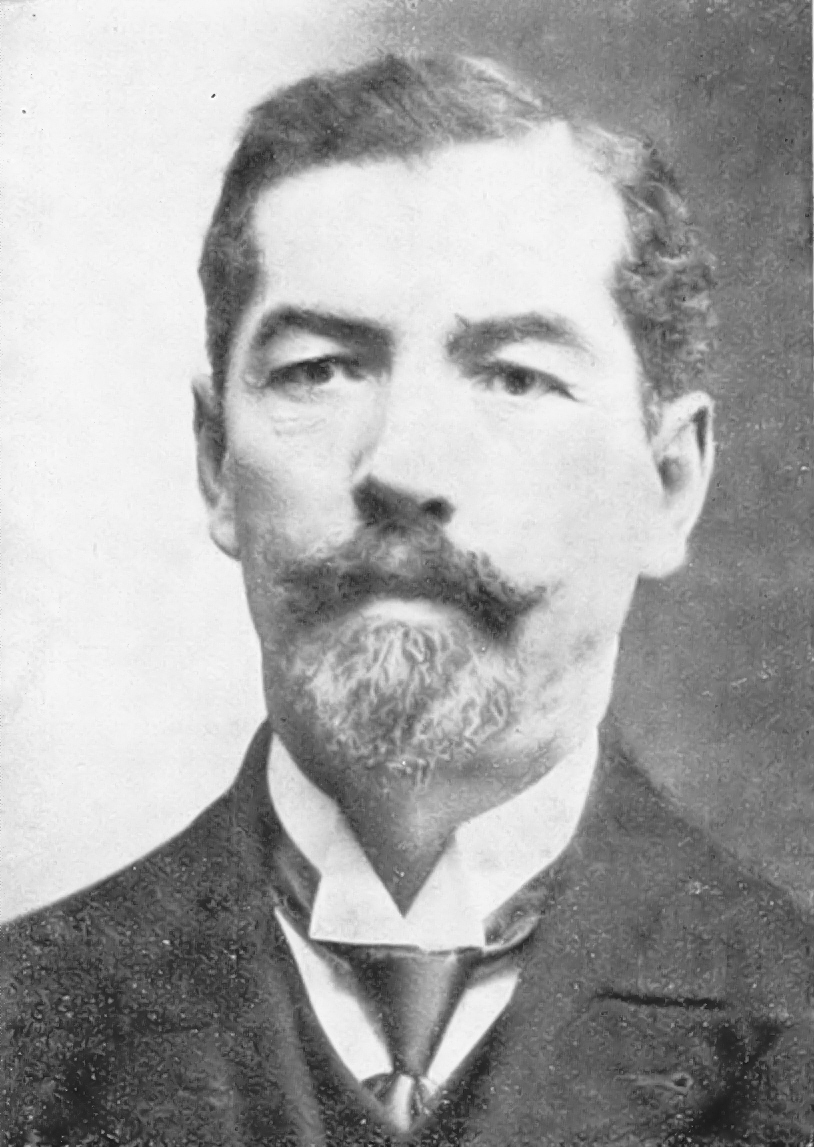
- Sava Athanasiu
- Born: April 28, 1861; Ruginești, Moldavia
- Died: April 8, 1946 (aged 84); Bucharest, Kingdom of Romania
- Education: University of Iași; University of Vienna
- Children: Ion Atanasiu; Gheorghe Atanasiu
- Parent(s): Costachi and Paraschiva Athanasiu
- Scientific career
- Fields: Paleontology
- Workplaces: University of Iași; Matei Basarab High School; Geological Institute of Romania; University of Bucharest
- Thesis: Geologische Studien in den nordmoldauischen Karpathen (1899)
- Academic advisors: Grigore Cobălcescu

Sava Athanasiu (28 April 1861 – 8 April 1946) was a Romanian geologist and paleontologist.

He was born in Ruginești, Vrancea County (at the time in Putna County), the first of Costachi and Paraschiva Athanasiu's four children. He first studied at the local school and at the Theological Seminary in Roman, and later completed a private high school in Iași, where he was attracted to the natural sciences by his teacher, Grigore Cobălcescu. He then entered the natural sciences faculty of the University of Iași, where Cobălcescu continued as his professor. From 1888 to 1892, he was Cobălcescu's assistant at the University of Iași. Aside from teaching younger students, one of his tasks was to organize the extensive collections his mentor had purchased, with a view to setting up a museum. After the latter's 1892 death, he was selected as a substitute professor. In 1890, he was hired by his former high school, and in 1891, by the Iași commercial school. In 1895, he enrolled in the University of Vienna, where his professors included Eduard Suess and Albrecht Penck. He obtained a doctorate in 1899 regarding geological studies of the northern Carpathians. From 1900 to 1909, he taught at Matei Basarab High School in Bucharest. He was a professor at the University of Bucharest from 1910 to 1936, and also worked at the Geological Institute of Romania from 1906 to 1930. He undertook a wide array of field research, writing numerous books and studies about his discoveries. Elected a corresponding member of the Romanian Academy in June 1920, he was made honorary member in June 1945. He died in Bucharest the next year.

Two of his sons were also elected to the Romanian Academy: Ion Atanasiu became a corresponding member in 1940 and Gheorghe Atanasiu became a titular member in 1963. An effort started in 2021 to name the school in Ruginești after him, but the proposal has not been approved as of 2023.

== Writings ==
- "Asupra presenței petroleului în Suceava", Buletinul Societății de Științe din București–România (in Romanian), 10 (1/2): 183–188, 1901
- "Studii geologice în districtul Suceava", Buletinul Societății de Științe din București–România (in Romanian), 7 (1): 61–84, 1898
- Contribuțiuni la studiul faunei terțiare de mamifere din România (PDF) (in Romanian), București: Institutul de arte Grafice Carol Göbl S-Sor I. St. Rasidescu, 1907
