= Căiuți =

- Commune
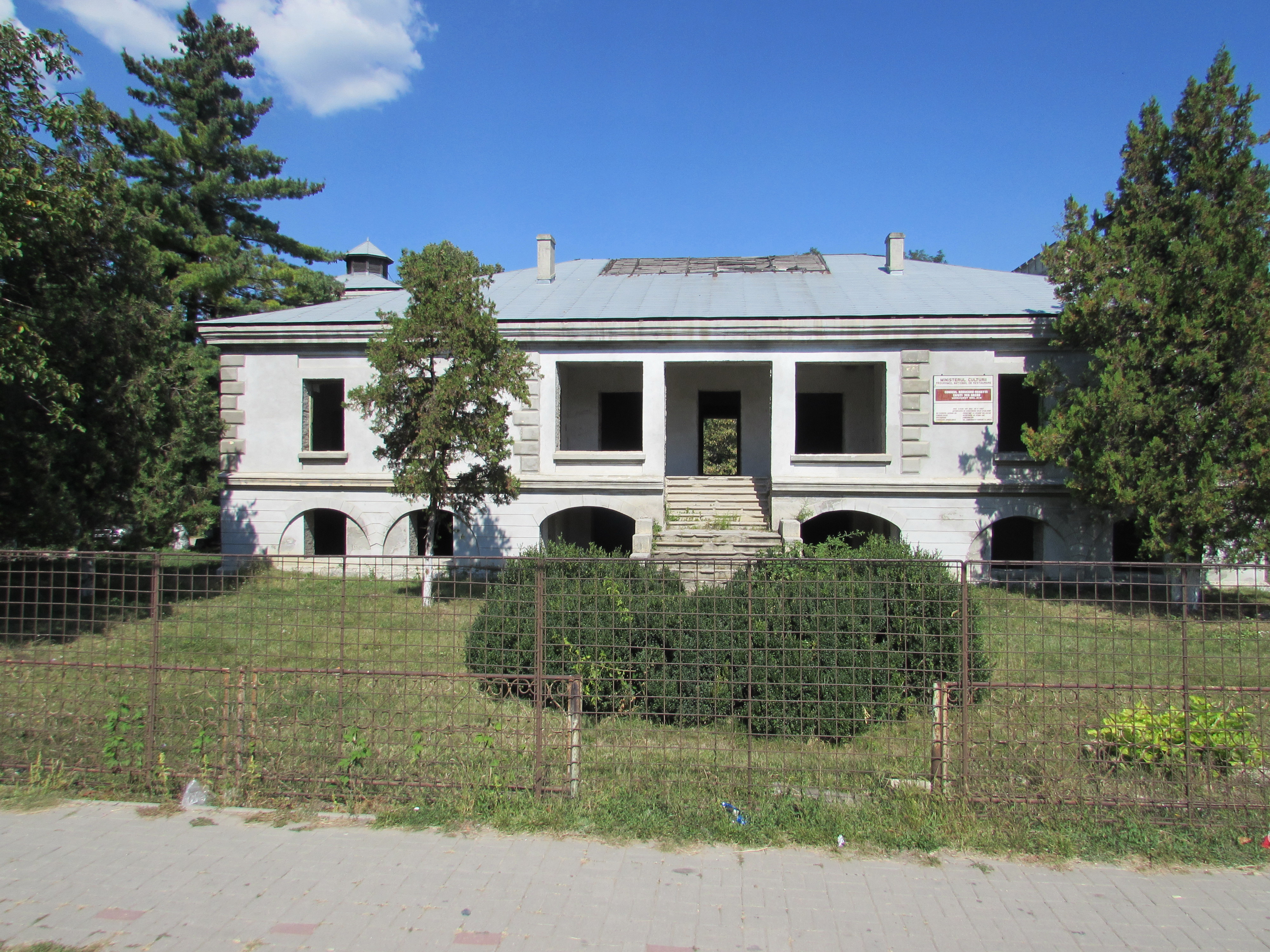
- Răducanu-Rosetti mansion in Căiuți

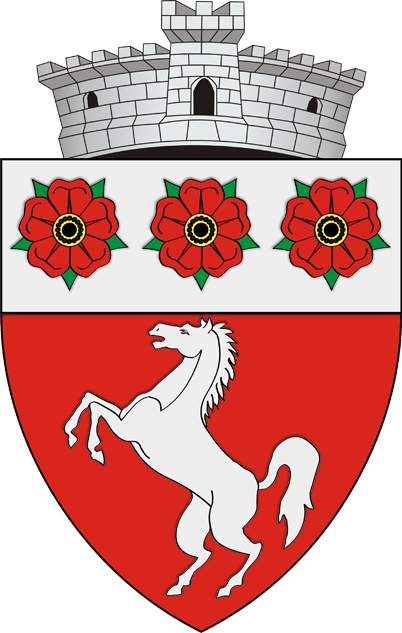
- Coat of arms

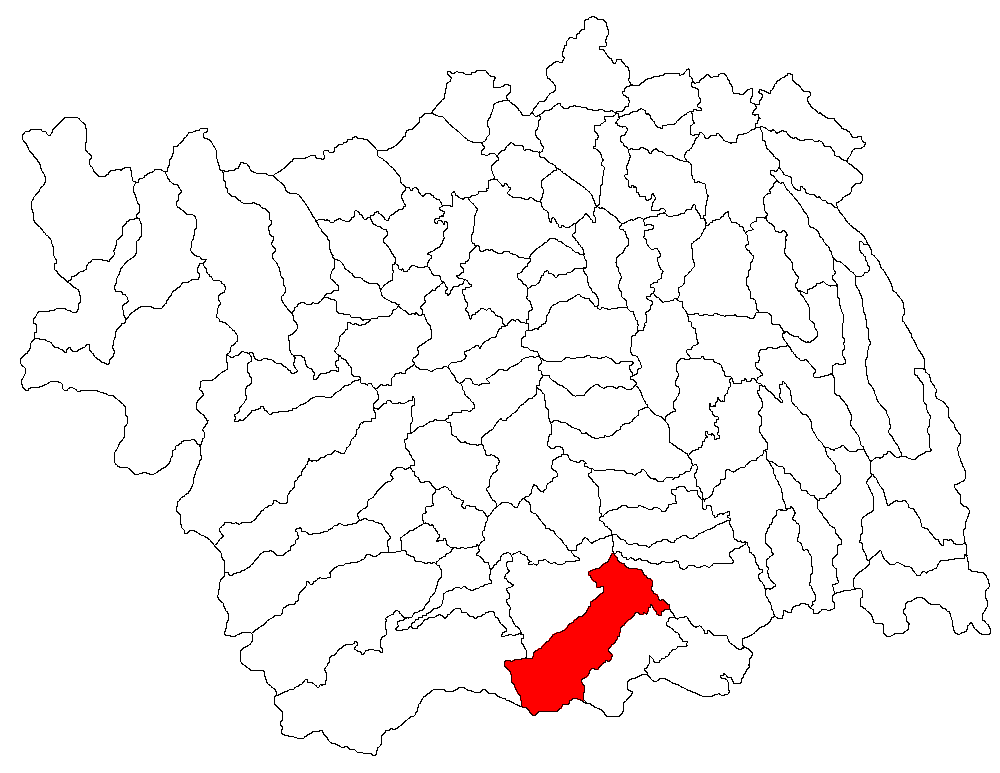
- Location in Bacău County

- Location in Romania
- Coordinates: 46°11′N 26°56′E
- Country: Romania
- County: Bacău

Government
  - Mayor (2020–2024): Gabriel Orândaru (PSD)
- Area: 46.85 km^{2} (18.09 sq mi)
- Elevation: 168 m (551 ft)
- Population (2021-12-01): 4,766
  - Density: 101.7/km^{2} (263.5/sq mi)
- Time zone: UTC+02:00 (EET)
  - Summer (DST): UTC+03:00 (EEST)
- Postal code: 607095
- Area code: +(40) 234
- Vehicle reg.: BC
- Website: www.primariacaiuti.ro

Căiuți is a commune in Bacău County, Western Moldavia, Romania. It is composed of nine villages: Blidari, Boiștea, Căiuți, Florești, Heltiu, Mărcești, Popeni, Pralea, and Vrânceni.

The commune is situated on the Moldavian Plateau, at an altitude of 168 m (551 ft), on the banks of the Trotuș River and its right tributary, the Căiuți. It is located in the southern part of Bacău County, 55 km (34 mi) south of the county seat, Bacău, on the border with Vrancea County. Căiuți is crossed by national road DN11A, which connects Onești to Bârlad.

Historical population
Year	Pop.	±%
2002	5,416	—
2011	5,252	−3.0%
2021	4,766	−9.3%
Source: Census data

== Natives ==
- Lavinia Agache (born 1968), artistic gymnast
- Radu R. Rosetti (1877–1949), brigadier general, military historian, librarian, and a titular member of the Romanian Academy
