= Caraclău =

- Location within Romania

Location
- Country: Romania
- Counties: Bacău County

Physical characteristics
- Mouth: Trotuș
  - coordinates: 46.2620°N 26.7277°E
- Length: 15 km (9.3 mi)
- Basin size: 26 km^{2} (10 sq mi)

Basin features
- Progression: Trotuș→ Siret→ Danube→ Black Sea

The Caraclău is a left tributary of the river Trotuș in Romania. It discharges into the Trotuș near Onești. Its length is 15 km (9.3 mi) and its basin size is 26 km^{2} (10 sq mi).
