= Tărhăuș =

Tărhăuș Tarhavas
- Location within Romania

Location
- Country: Romania
- Counties: Bacău County
- Villages: Tărhăuși

Physical characteristics
- Source: Tarcău Mountains
- Mouth: Trotuș
  - location: Tărhăuși
  - coordinates: 46.5695°N 26.0754°E
- Length: 12 km (7.5 mi)
- Basin size: 43 km^{2} (17 sq mi)

Basin features
- Progression: Trotuș→ Siret→ Danube→ Black Sea

The Tărhăuș (Hungarian: Tarhavas-pataka, meaning Bold Alp's Creek) is a left tributary of the river Trotuș in Romania. It discharges into the Trotuș in Tărhăuși. Its length is 12 km (7.5 mi) and its basin size is 43 km^{2} (17 sq mi).
