= Bărzăuța =

- Location within Romania

Location
- Country: Romania
- Counties: Covasna, Harghita, Bacău

Physical characteristics
- Source: Nemira Mountains
- Mouth: Uz
  - coordinates: 46.3344°N 26.2930°E
- Length: 26 km (16 mi)
- Basin size: 156 km^{2} (60 sq mi)

Basin features
- Progression: Uz→ Trotuș→ Siret→ Danube→ Black Sea
- Tributaries
  - left: Apa Lină
  - right: Romanul, Vale Mare, Țiganca, Chilișca

The Bărzăuța (in its upper course also: Apa Roșie) is a right tributary of the river Uz in Romania. It discharges into the Uz near Valea Uzului. Its length is 26 km (16 mi) and its basin size is 156 km^{2} (60 sq mi).
