= Brusturoasa =

- Commune
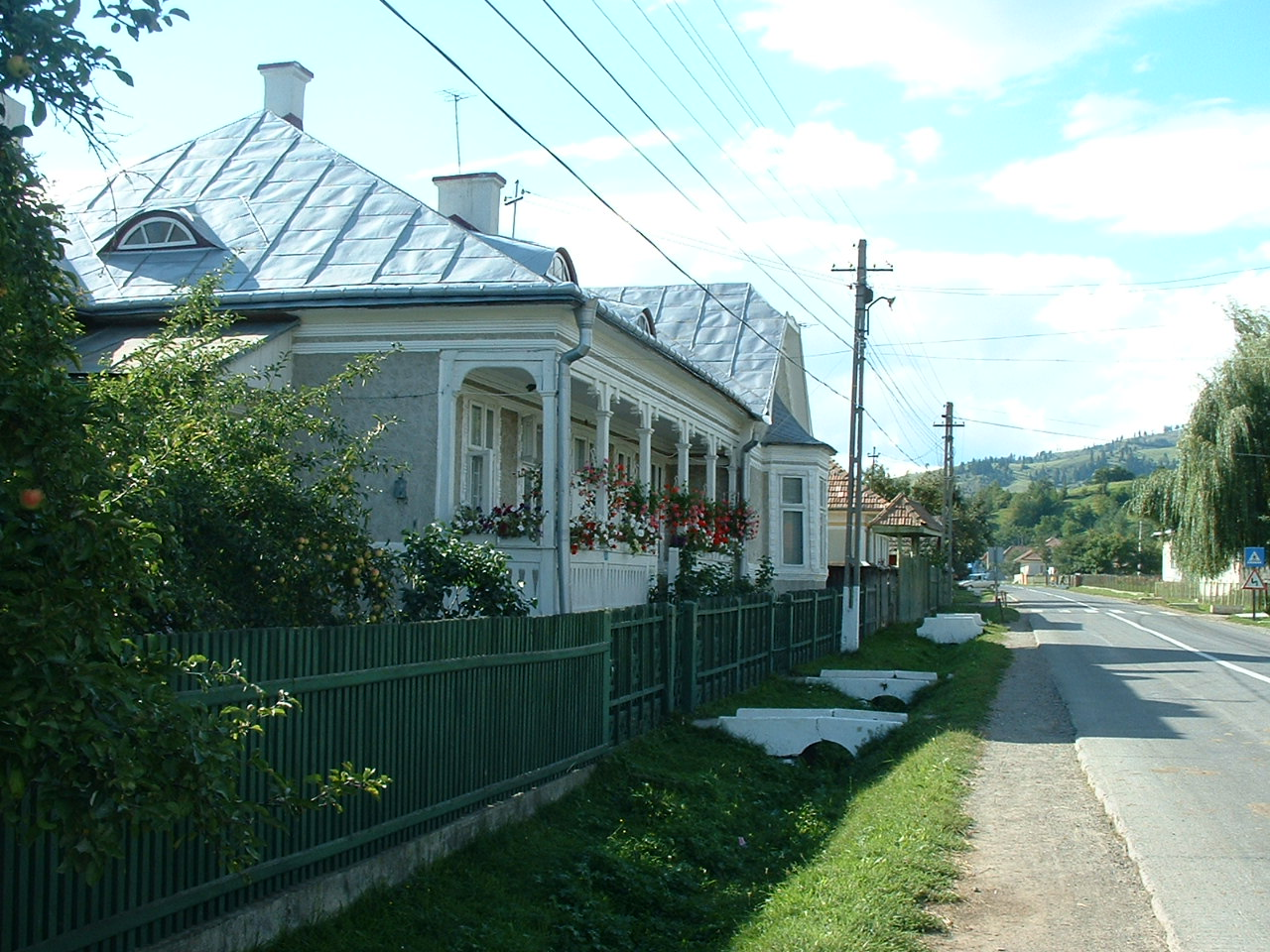
- Brusturoasa village

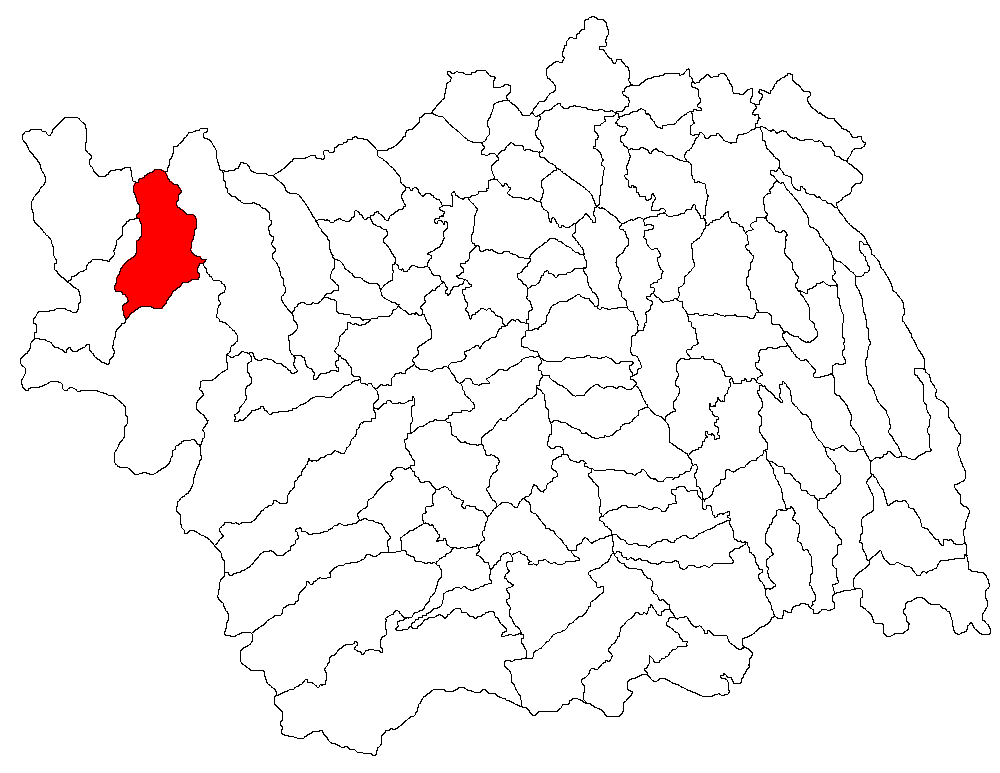
- Location in Bacău County

- Location in Romania
- Coordinates: 46°31′N 26°12′E
- Country: Romania
- County: Bacău

Government
  - Mayor (2020–2024): Valeriu Atudorei (PSD)
- Area: 109.9 km^{2} (42.4 sq mi)
- Elevation: 605 m (1,985 ft)
- Population (2021-12-01): 3,120
  - Density: 28.4/km^{2} (73.5/sq mi)
- Time zone: UTC+02:00 (EET)
  - Summer (DST): UTC+03:00 (EEST)
- Postal code: 607075
- Area code: +(40) 234
- Vehicle reg.: BC
- Website: www.brusturoasa.ro

Brusturoasa is a commune in Bacău County, Western Moldavia, Romania. It is composed of six villages: Brusturoasa, Buruieniș, Buruienișu de Sus, Camenca, Cuchiniș, and Hângănești.

The commune is situated in the southern foothills of the Tarcău Mountains. It lies at altitude of 605 m (1,985 ft), on the banks of the river Trotuș and its left tributary, the Șugura.

Brusturoasa is located in the northwestern part of Bacău County, 76 km (47 mi) from the county seat, Bacău, on the border with Neamț County. It is traversed by national road DN12A, which starts in Onești, 63 km (39 mi) to the southeast, continues over the Ghimeș-Palanca Pass, and ends in Miercurea Ciuc. The Brusturoasa halt serves the CFR railway line 501, which runs parallel with the road and connects Adjud to Siculeni.

Historical population
Year	Pop.	±%
2002	3,532	—
2011	3,138	−11.2%
2021	3,120	−0.6%
Source: Census data
