= Ruginești =

- Commune
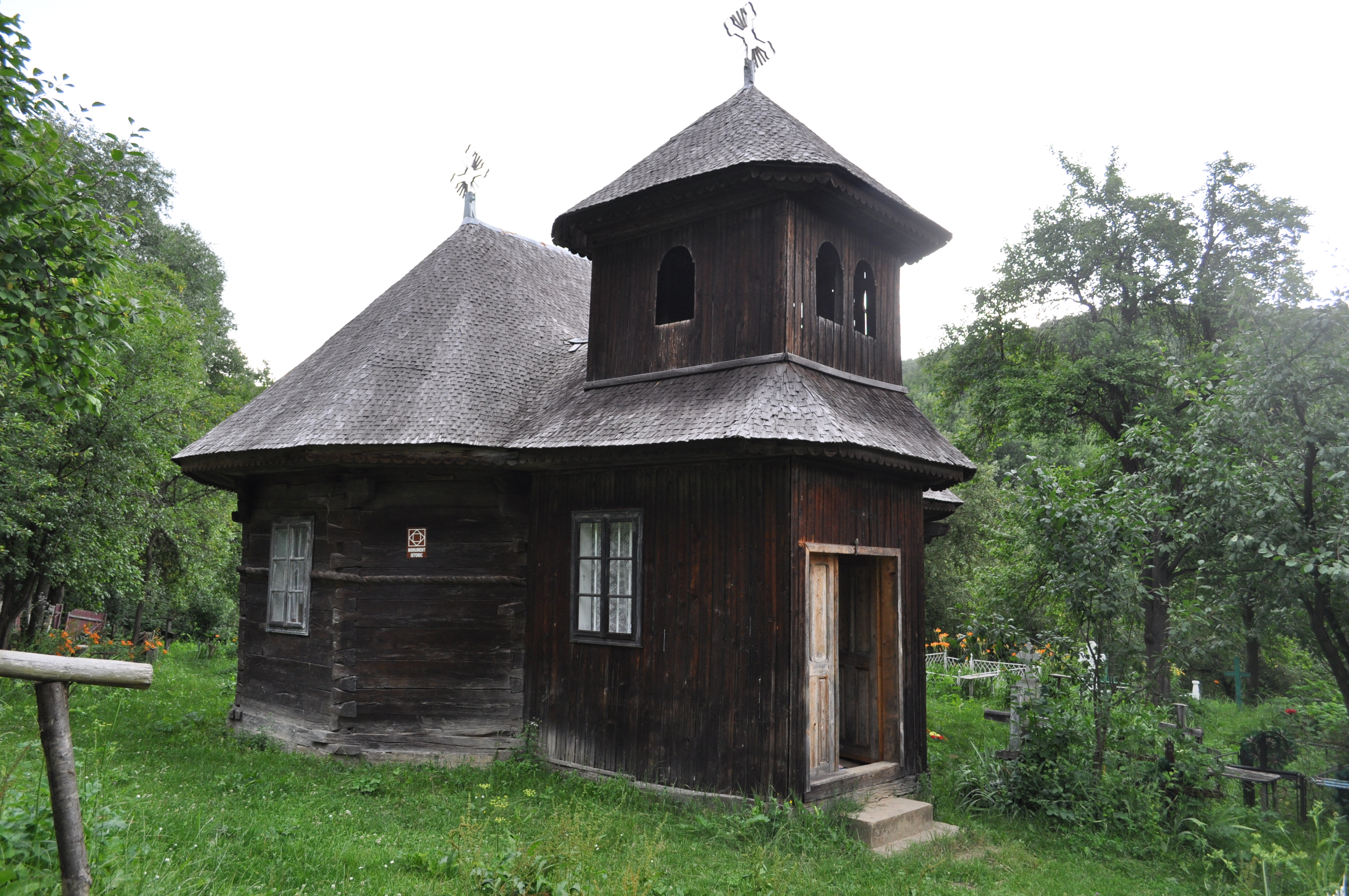
- Wooden church in Anghelești

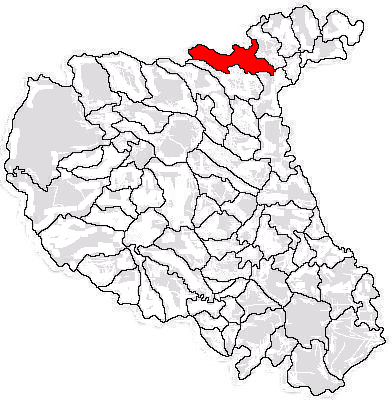
- Location in Vrancea County

- Location in Romania
- Coordinates: 46°04′N 27°08′E
- Country: Romania
- County: Vrancea

Government
  - Mayor (2024–2028): Ion Avram (PSD)
- Area: 63.37 km^{2} (24.47 sq mi)
- Elevation: 170 m (560 ft)
- Population (2021-12-01): 4,129
  - Density: 65.16/km^{2} (168.8/sq mi)
- Time zone: UTC+02:00 (EET)
  - Summer (DST): UTC+03:00 (EEST)
- Postal code: 627295
- Area code: +(40) 237
- Vehicle reg.: VN
- Website: www.ruginesti.ro

Ruginești is a commune located in Vrancea County, Romania. It is composed of four villages: Anghelești, Copăcești, Ruginești, and Văleni.

The commune lies on the right bank of the Domoșița River. It is located in the northern part of Vrancea County, 46 km (29 mi) from the county seat, Focșani, on the border with Bacău County.

Historical population
Year	Pop.	±%
2002	4,444	—
2011	3,497	−21.3%
2021	4,129	+18.1%
Source: Census data

== Natives ==
- Sava Athanasiu (1861 – 1946), geologist and paleontologist
- Marius Bostan (born 1970), economist and politician
