= Lunca de Jos =

Lunca de Jos Gyimesközéplok
- Commune
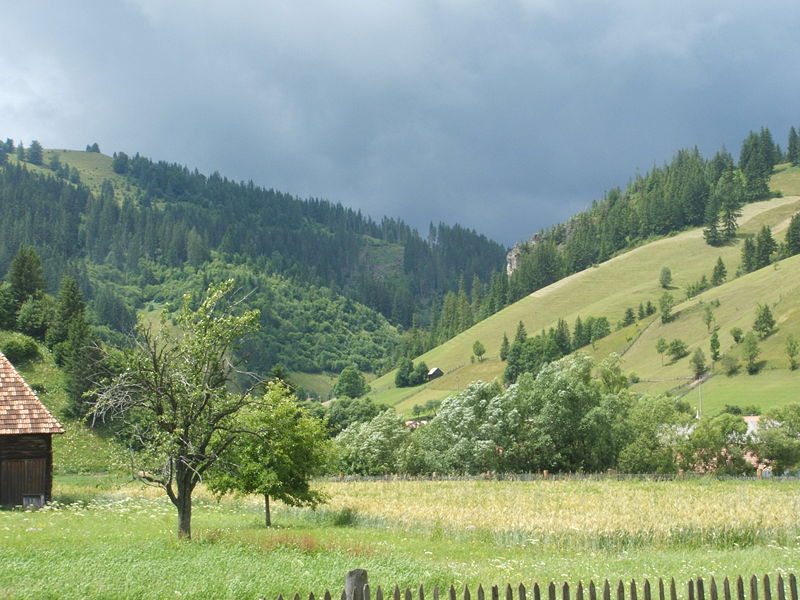

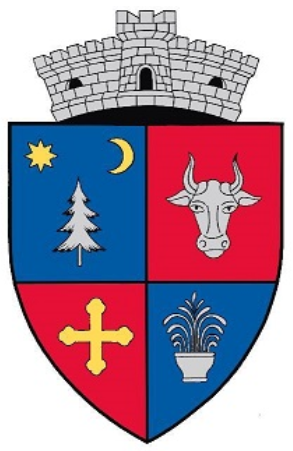
- Coat of arms

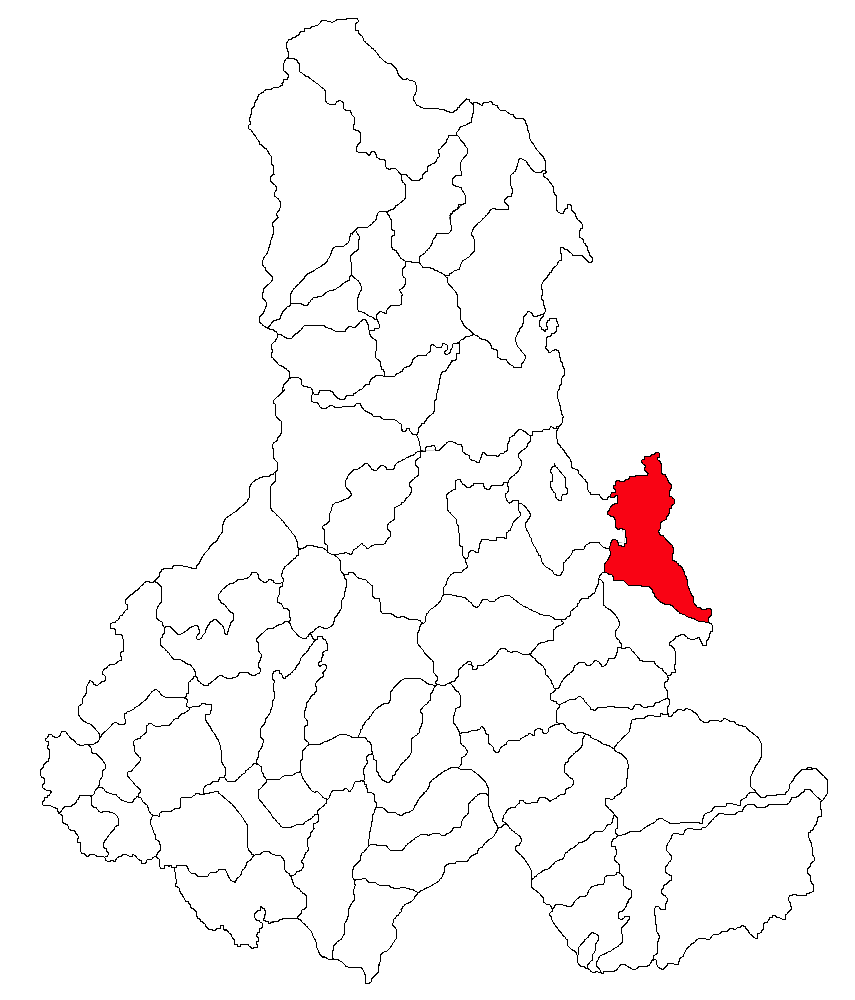
- Location in Harghita County

- Location in Romania
- Coordinates: 46°34′N 25°59′E
- Country: Romania
- County: Harghita

Government
  - Mayor (2020–2024): Karoly Gergely (UDMR)
- Area: 59.06 km^{2} (22.80 sq mi)
- Elevation: 930 m (3,050 ft)
- Population (2021-12-01): 5,093
  - Density: 86.23/km^{2} (223.3/sq mi)
- Time zone: UTC+02:00 (EET)
  - Summer (DST): UTC+03:00 (EEST)
- Postal code: 537145
- Area code: +(40) 266
- Vehicle reg.: HR
- Website: gyimeskozeplok.ro

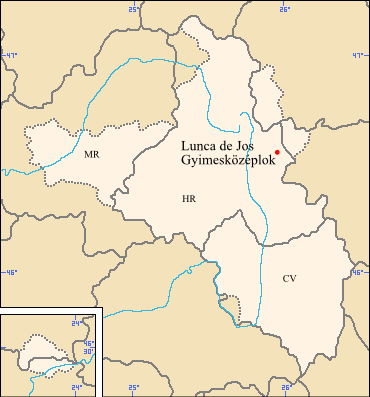
Location of Lunca de Jos in the historic Székely Land

Lunca de Jos (Hungarian: Gyimesközéplok, Hungarian pronunciation: [ˈɟimɛʃkøzeːplok], colloquially Középlok) is a commune in Harghita County, Transylvania, Romania. It lies in the ethno-cultural region Székely Land. The commune is composed of nine villages: Barațcoș (Barackospatak), Lunca de Jos, Puntea Lupului (Farkaspalló), Poiana Fagului (Bükkhavaspataka), Valea Boroș (Borospataka), Valea Capelei (Kápolnáspataka), Valea Întunecoasă (Sötétpataka), Valea lui Antaloc (Antalokpataka), and Valea Rece (Hidegség).

== Geography ==
Lunca de Jos is situated at the foot of the Ciuc Mountains, at an altitude of 930 m (3,050 ft), on the banks of the river Dămuc and the river Valea Rece and its right tributary, the Iavardi. It is located in the eastern part of Harghita County, 37 km (23 mi) northeast of the county seat, Miercurea Ciuc, on the border with Bacău and Neamț counties.

The commune is crossed by the national road DN12A, which connects Miercurea Ciuc with Onești, Bacău County, crossing the Eastern Carpathians through the nearby Ghimeș-Palanca Pass. The Lunca de Mijloc train station serves the CFR railway line 501, which runs parallel with the road and connects Siculeni to Adjud, Vrancea County.

== History ==
The village was historically part of the Székely Land region of Transylvania province. The first reports of settlers in the area was from 1721. It became independent from Gyimesbükk in 1795. The birth registry starts from 1854. The village belonged to Csíkszék district until the administrative reform of Transylvania in 1876, when they fell within the Csík County in the Kingdom of Hungary. In the aftermath of World War I, the Union of Transylvania with Romania was declared in December 1918. At the start of the Hungarian–Romanian War of 1918–1919, the locality passed under Romanian administration. After the Treaty of Trianon of 1920, it became part of the Kingdom of Romania and fell within plasa Frumoasa of Ciuc County during the interwar period.

In 1940, the Second Vienna Award granted Northern Transylvania to Hungary. Towards the end of World War II, Romanian and Soviet armies entered the area in September 1944. The territory of Northern Transylvania remained under Soviet military administration until 9 March 1945, after which it became again part of Romania. In 1950, after Communist Romania was established, Lunca de Jos became part of the Ciuc Raion of Stalin Region. Between 1952 and 1960, the commune fell within the Magyar Autonomous Region, between 1960 and 1968 the Mureș-Magyar Autonomous Region. After the administrative reform of 1968, the region was abolished, and since then, the commune has been part of Harghita County.

== Demographics ==
Historical population
Year	Pop.	±%
1850	770	—
1857	1,113	+44.5%
1881	1,824	+63.9%
1890	1,984	+8.8%
1900	2,628	+32.5%
1910	3,080	+17.2%
1930	4,870	+58.1%
1941	5,366	+10.2%
1981	5,528	+3.0%
1992	5,317	−3.8%
2002	5,227	−1.7%
2011	5,328	+1.9%
2021	5,093	−4.4%
Source: Census data

At the 2011 census, the commune had a population of 5,328; out of them, 97.84% were Hungarians and 0.7% were Romanians. At the 2021 census, Lunca de Jos had 5,093 inhabitants; of those, 92.72% were Hungarians and 1.47% Roma.

== Economy ==
Until 1989, it was the center of local timber manufacturing with a board and since 1976 a furniture factory. The main activity of the villagers is cattle herding and potato production. Industrial activity has decreased significantly after 1990.
