= Uz (river) =

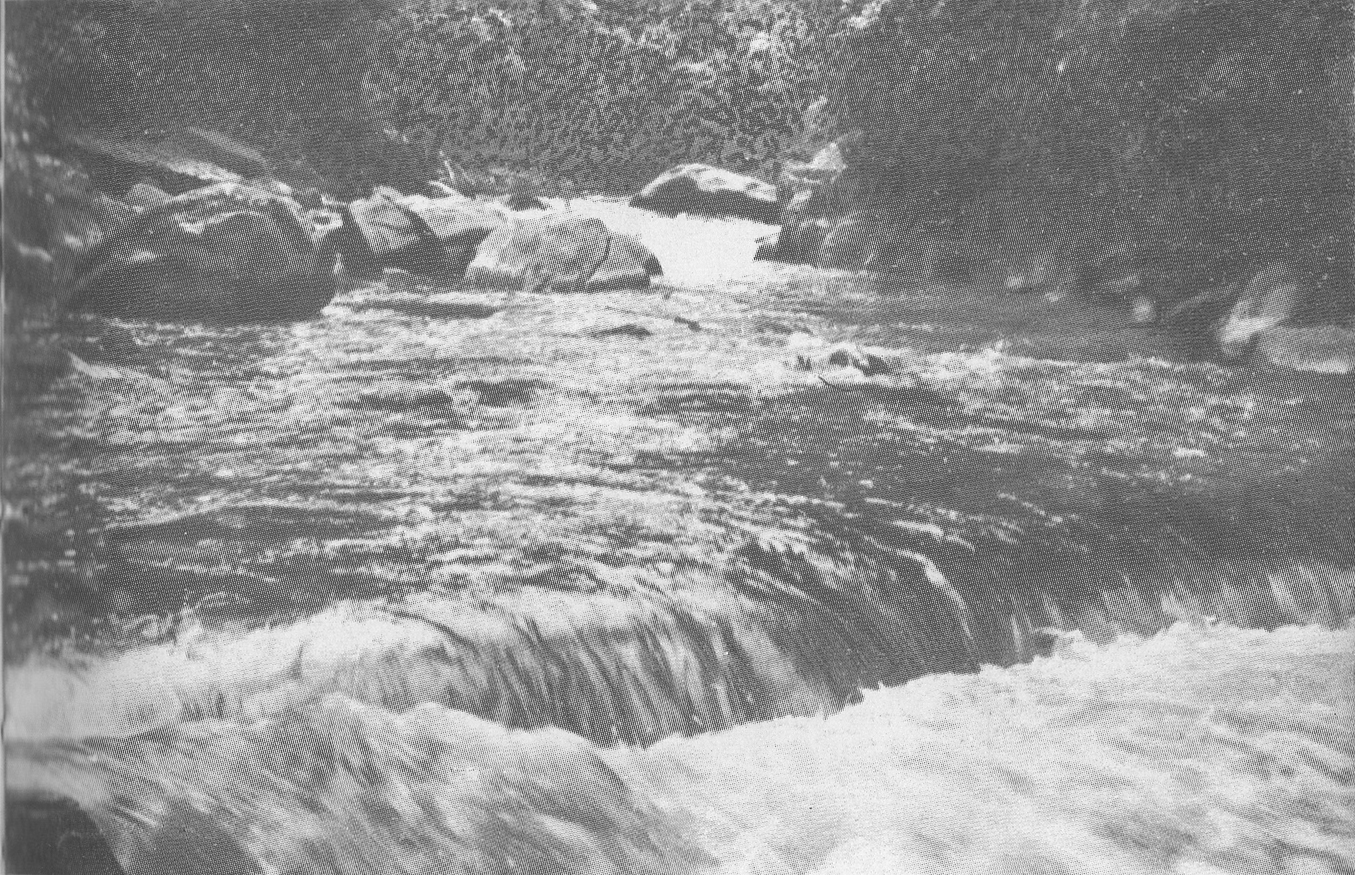

- Location within Romania

Location
- Country: Romania
- Counties: Harghita, Bacău
- Villages: Eghersec, Valea Uzului, Dărmănești

Physical characteristics
- Source: Ciuc Mountains
- Mouth: Trotuș
  - location: Dărmănești
  - coordinates: 46.3645°N 26.5152°E
- Length: 50 km (31 mi)
- Basin size: 469 km^{2} (181 sq mi)

Basin features
- Progression: Trotuș→ Siret→ Danube→ Black Sea

The Uz (Hungarian: Úz) is a right tributary of the river Trotuș in Romania. It discharges into the Trotuș in Dărmănești. The Poiana Uzului Dam is located on the river Uz. Its length is 50 km (31 mi) and its basin size is 469 km^{2} (181 sq mi).

== Tributaries ==
The following rivers are tributaries to the river Uz (from source to mouth):

- Left: Eghersec, Oreg, Rața, Soveto, Mogheruș, Copuria, Răchitiș, Câmp
- Right: Bașca, Bărzăuța, Izvorul Alb, Groza, Tulburea, Izvorul Negru
