= Dărmănești =

- Town
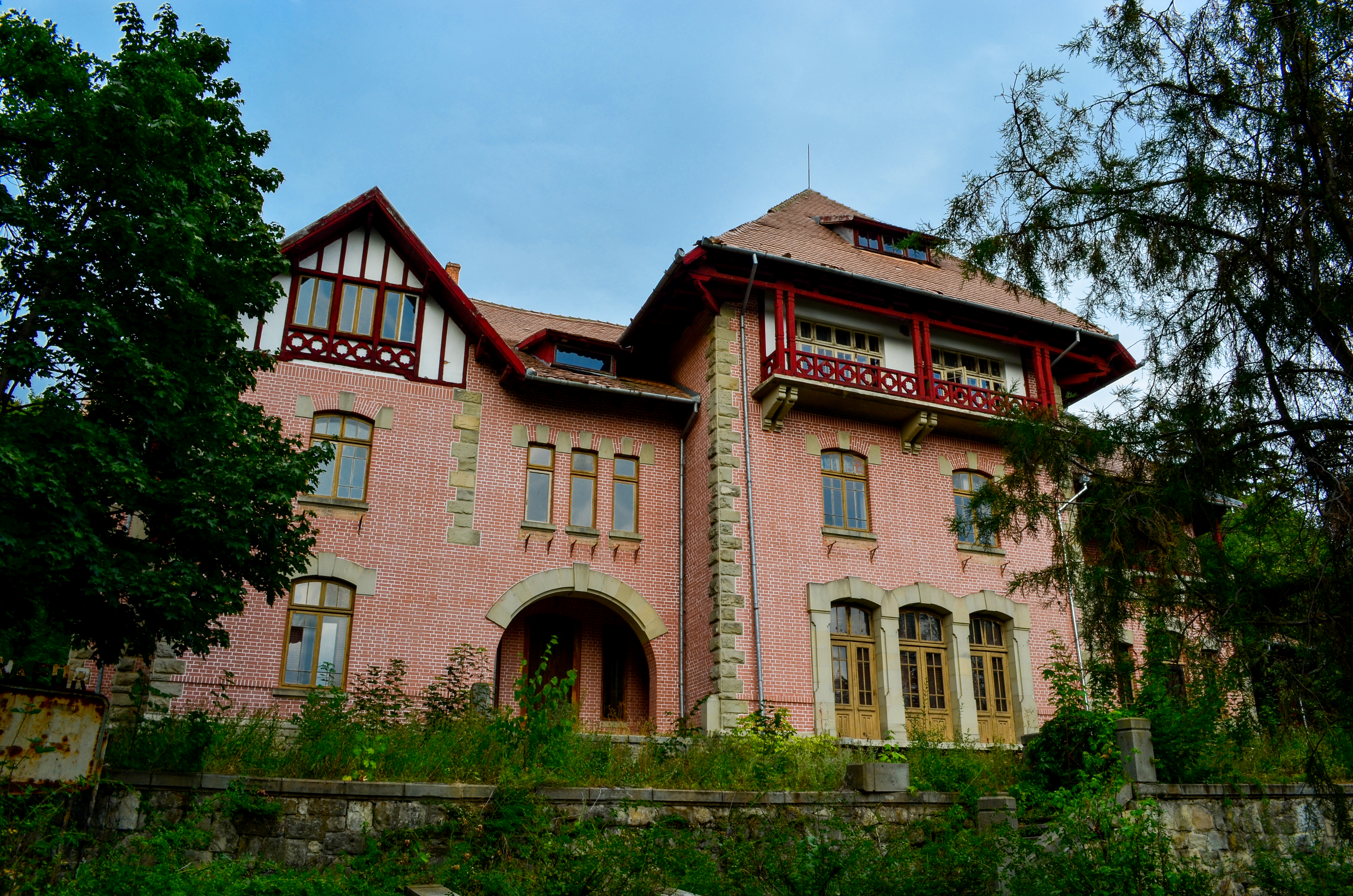
- Știrbei Palace

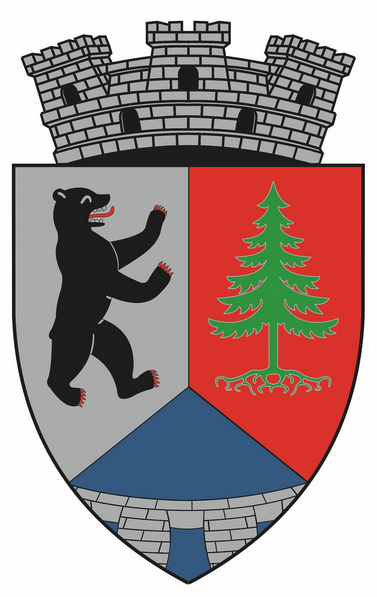
- Coat of arms

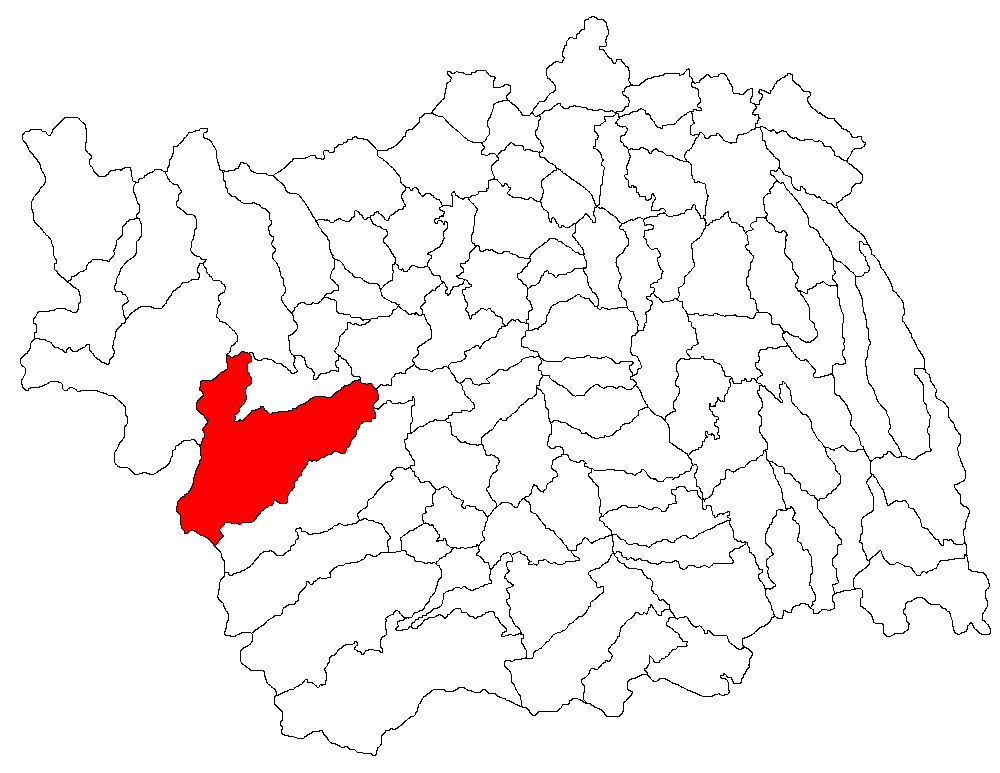
- Location in Bacău County

- Location in Romania
- Coordinates: 46°22′12″N 26°28′47″E
- Country: Romania
- County: Bacău

Government
  - Mayor (2024–2028): Toma Constantin (PNL)
- Area: 270.43 km^{2} (104.41 sq mi)
- Elevation: 350 m (1,150 ft)
- Population (2021-12-01): 13,069
  - Density: 48.327/km^{2} (125.17/sq mi)
- Time zone: UTC+02:00 (EET)
  - Summer (DST): UTC+03:00 (EEST)
- Postal code: 605300
- Area code: (+40) 02 34
- Vehicle reg.: BC
- Website: orasuldarmanesti.ro

Dărmănești (Romanian pronunciation: [dərməˈneʃtʲ]; Hungarian: Dormánfalva) is a town in eastern Romania, in Bacău County, in the valleys of the Trotuș and Uz rivers. The town is named after one of its leaders, "Dărman" and the earliest reference to the town is from the 16th century. As of 2021, it has a population of 13,069. It officially became a town in 1989, as a result of the Romanian rural systematization program.

The town administers five villages: Dărmăneasca, Lapoș, Păgubeni, Plopu, and Sălătruc.

Dărmănești is located in the western part of Bacău County, on the border with Harghita County.

== Natives ==
- Relu Fenechiu (born 1965), businessman and former politician
- Anamaria Vartolomei (born 1999), actress

Historical population
Year	Pop.	±%
1992	13,883	—
2002	14,232	+2.5%
2011	12,247	−13.9%
2021	13,069	+6.7%
Source: Census data
