= Neoabietadiene synthase =

Enzyme

Identifiers
- EC no.: 4.2.3.132

Databases
- IntEnz: IntEnz view
- BRENDA: BRENDA entry
- ExPASy: NiceZyme view
- KEGG: KEGG entry
- MetaCyc: metabolic pathway
- PRIAM: profile
- PDB structures: RCSB PDB PDBe PDBsum
Search
- PMC: articles
- PubMed: articles
- NCBI: proteins

Neoabietadiene synthase (EC 4.2.3.132, AgAS, PtTPS-LAS) is an enzyme with systematic name (+)-copaly-diphosphate diphosphate-lyase (cyclizing, neoabietadiene-forming). This enzyme catalyses the following chemical reaction:

(+)-copalyl diphosphate $\rightleftharpoons$ neoabietadiene + diphosphate

This enzyme is isolated from Abies grandis (grand fir).
