= Coțofănești =

- Commune
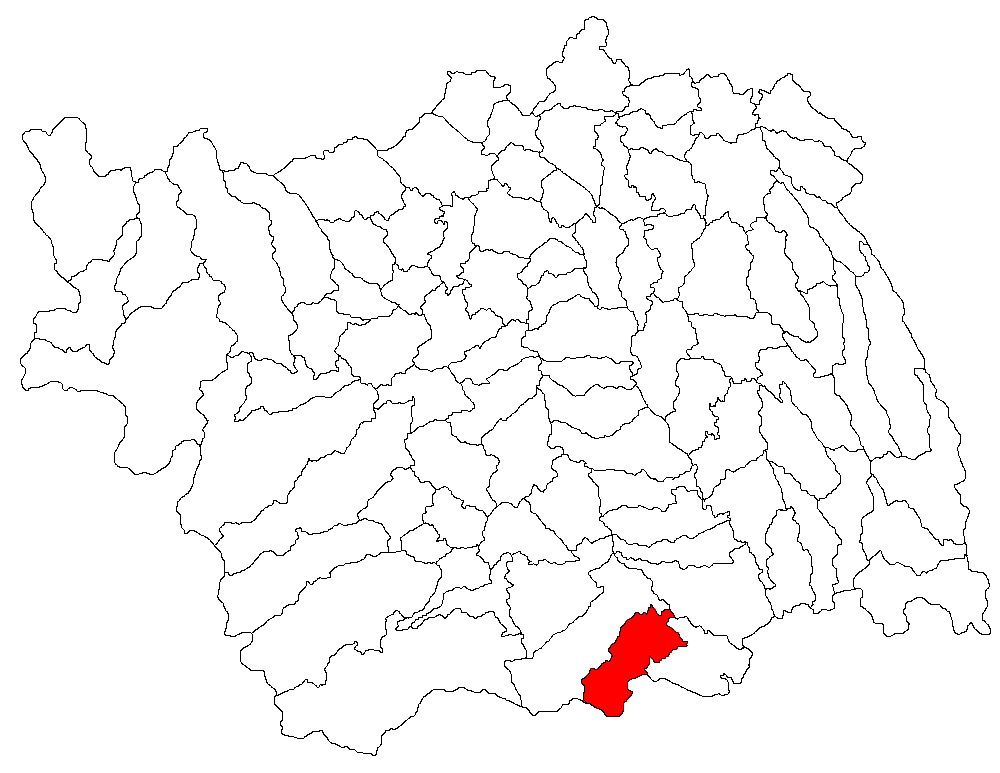
- Location in Bacău County

- Location in Romania
- Coordinates: 46°09′N 26°59′E
- Country: Romania
- County: Bacău

Government
  - Mayor (2024–2028): Viorel Olariu (PSD)
- Elevation: 162 m (531 ft)
- Population (2021-12-01): 3,306
- Time zone: EET/EEST (UTC+2/+3)
- Postal code: 607130
- Area code: +(40) 234
- Vehicle reg.: BC
- Website: comunacotofanesti.ro

Coțofănești is a commune in Bacău County, Western Moldavia, Romania. It is composed of five villages: Bâlca, Boiștea de Jos, Borșani, Coțofănești, and Tămășoaia.

Historical population
Year	Pop.	±%
2002	3,321	—
2011	3,199	−3.7%
2021	3,306	+3.3%
Source: Census data
