= Agăș =

- Commune
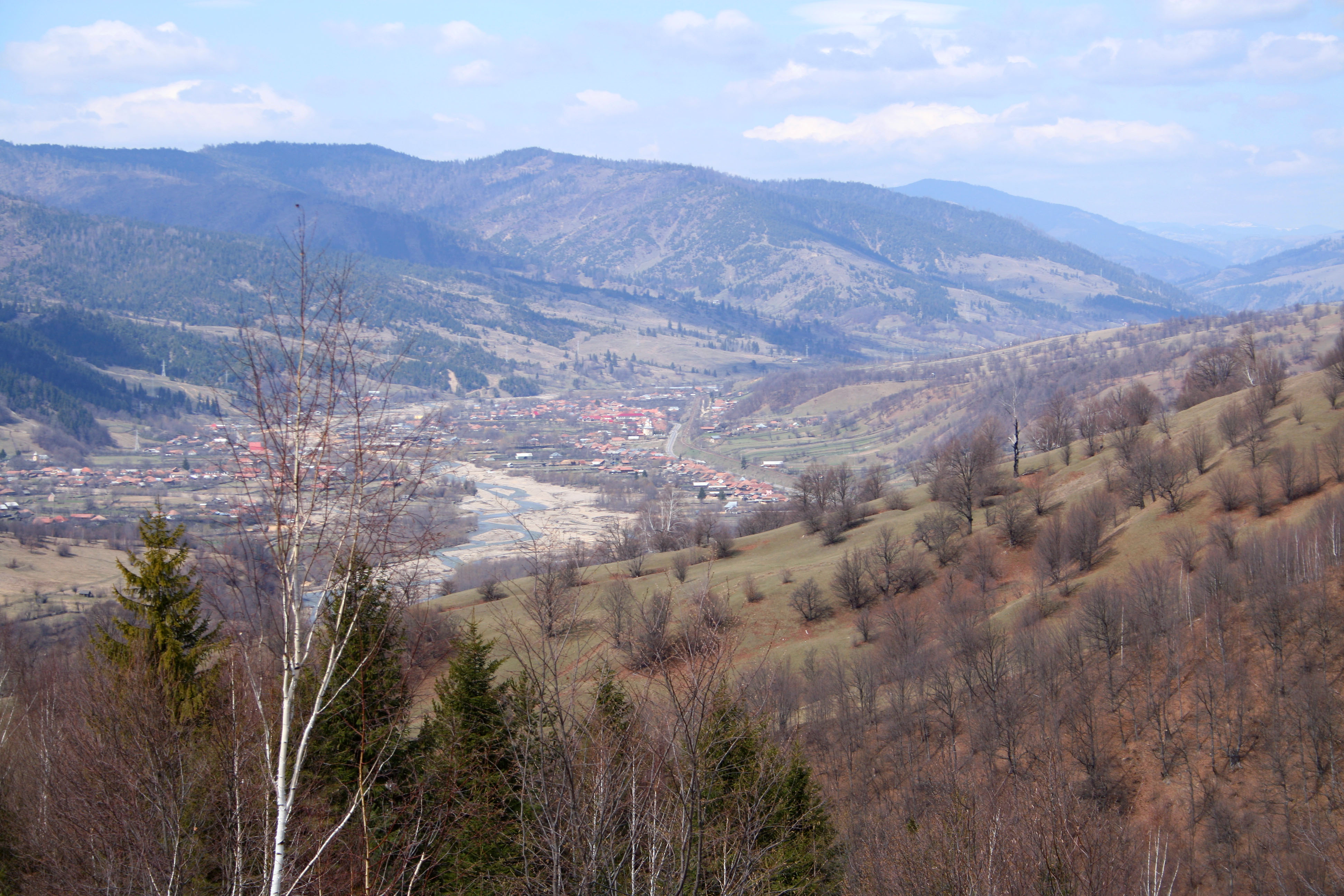
- View of Preluci

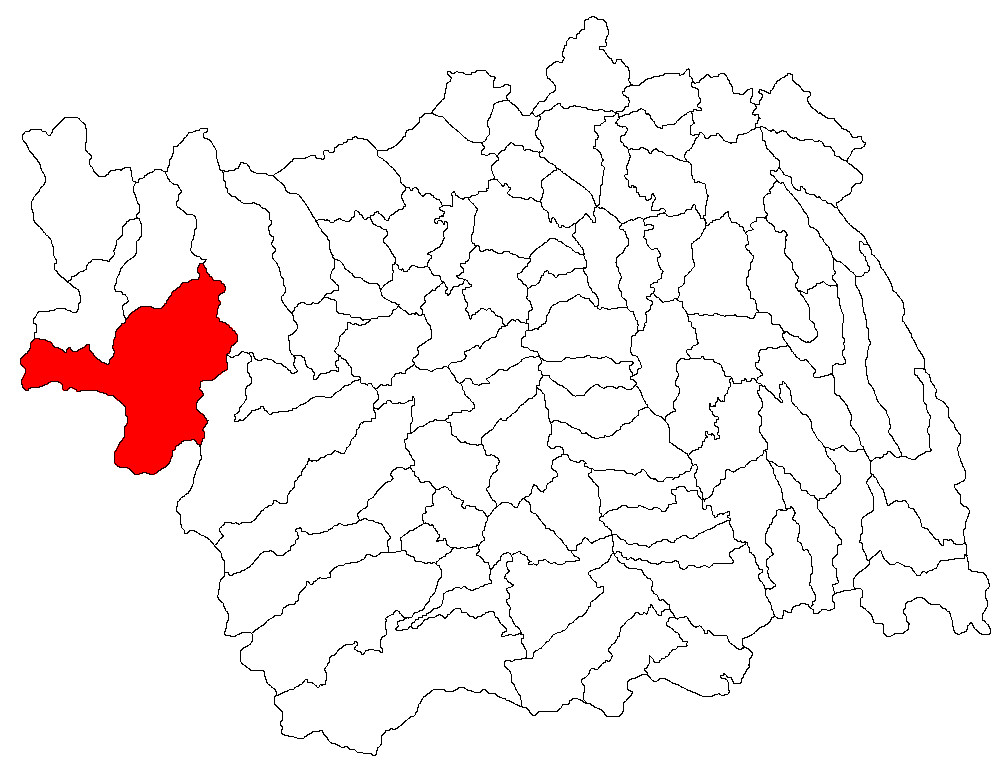
- Location in Bacău County

- Location in Romania
- Coordinates: 46°29′N 26°13′E
- Country: Romania
- County: Bacău

Government
  - Mayor (2024–2028): Nicușor Cernea (PSD)
- Area: 210.4 km^{2} (81.2 sq mi)
- Elevation: 561 m (1,841 ft)
- Population (2021-12-01): 5,247
  - Density: 24.94/km^{2} (64.59/sq mi)
- Time zone: UTC+02:00 (EET)
  - Summer (DST): UTC+03:00 (EEST)
- Postal code: 607005
- Area code: +(40) 234
- Vehicle reg.: BC
- Website: primaria-agas.ro

Agăș is a commune in Bacău County, Western Moldavia, Romania. It is composed of eight villages: Agăș, Beleghet, Coșnea, Cotumba, Diaconești, Goioasa, Preluci, and Sulța.

Historical population
Year	Pop.	±%
2002	6,668	—
2011	5,884	−11.8%
2021	5,247	−10.8%
Source: Census data
