= Trotuș =

Trotuș Tatros
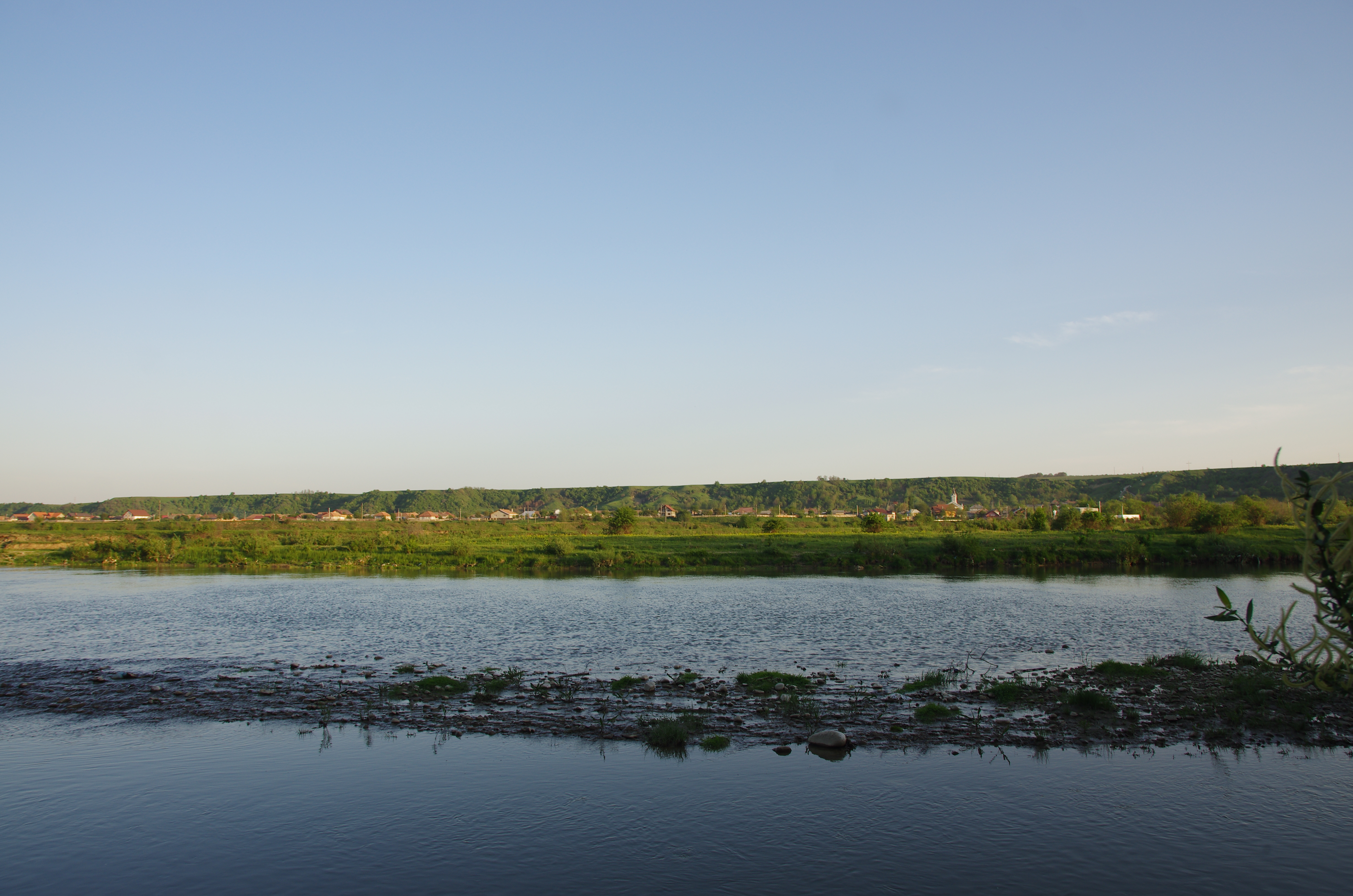
- The river Trotuș in Târgu Trotuș, Bacău County

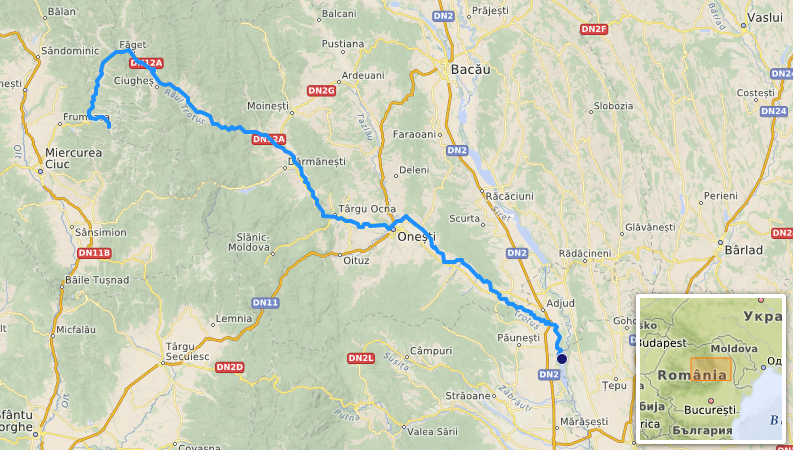
- Path of the river Trotuș

Location
- Country: Romania
- Counties: Harghita, Bacău, Vrancea
- Towns: Comănești, Onești, Adjud

Physical characteristics
- Source: Ciuc Mountains
- Mouth: Siret
  - location: Adjud
  - coordinates: 46°00′40″N 27°12′33″E
- Length: 162 km (101 mi)
- Basin size: 4,456 km^{2} (1,720 sq mi)

Basin features
- Progression: Siret→ Danube→ Black Sea
- Tributaries
  - left: Asău, Tazlău
  - right: Uz

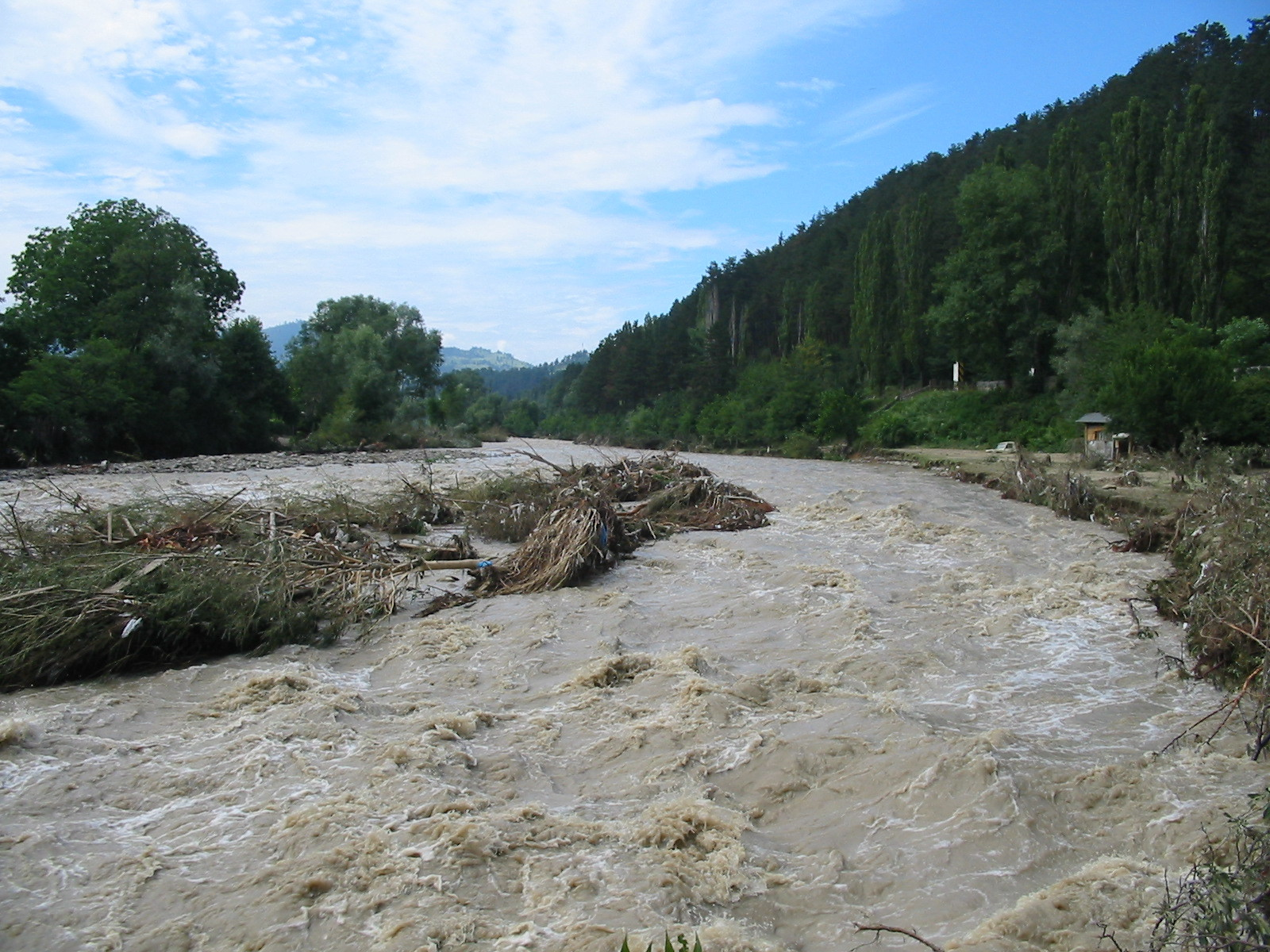
Trotuș flood in Comănești (2004)

The Trotuș (Hungarian: Tatros) is a river in eastern Romania, a right tributary of the river Siret. It emerges from the Ciuc Mountains in the Eastern Carpathians and joins the Siret in Domnești-Sat near Adjud after passing through Comănești and Onești in Bacău County. The total length of the Trotuș from its source to its confluence with the Siret is 162 km (101 mi). Its basin area is 4,456 km^{2} (1,720 sq mi).

== Towns and villages ==
The following towns and villages are situated along the river Trotuș, from source to mouth: Lunca de Sus, Lunca de Jos, Ghimeș-Făget, Palanca, Agăș, Comănești, Dărmănești, Târgu Ocna, Onești, and Adjud.

== Tributaries ==
The following rivers are tributaries to the Trotuș (from source to mouth):

Left: Gârbea, Valea Întunecoasă, Antaloc, Valea Rece, Bolovăniș, Tărhăuș, Șanț, Cuchiniș, Brusturoasa, Caminca, Șugura, Dracău, Agăș, Seaca, Ciungi, Asău, Urmeniș, Plopul, Larga, Cucuieți, Vâlcele, Gălian, Caraclău, Tazlău, and Pârâul Mare.

Right: Comiat, Bothavaș, Ugra, Boroș, Valea Capelei, Aldămaș, Popoiul, Ciugheș, Cotumba, Grohotiș, Sulța, Ciobănuș, Șopan, Uz, Dofteana, Slănic, Nicorești, Oituz, Cașin, Găureana, Gutinaș, Bogdana, Gârbovana, Căiuți, Popeni, Bâlca, and Domoșița.
