= Bistrița (Siret) =

River in Romania, tributary to Siret River

Bistrița Bistrița Moldoveană
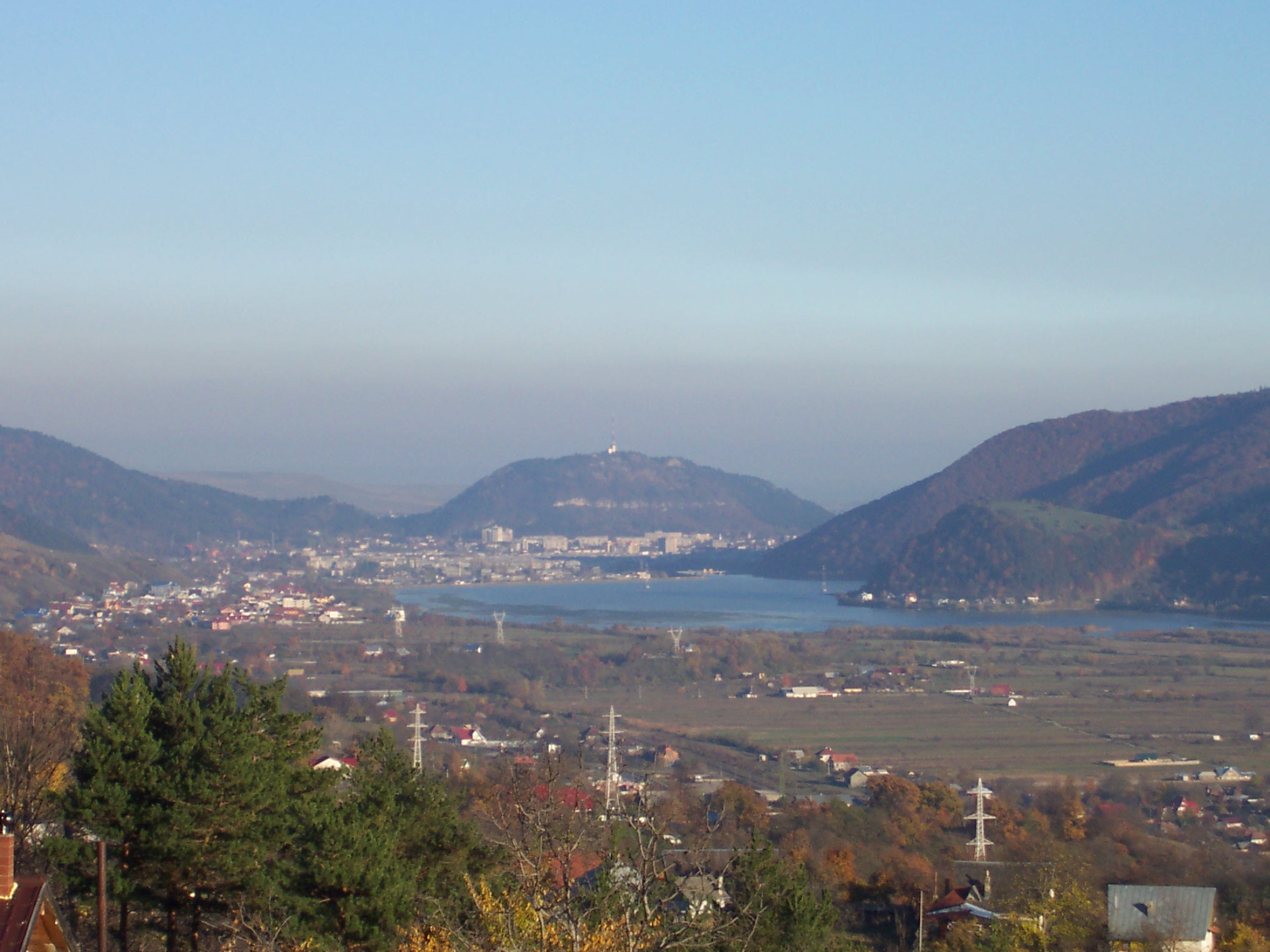
- The Bistrița at Piatra Neamț

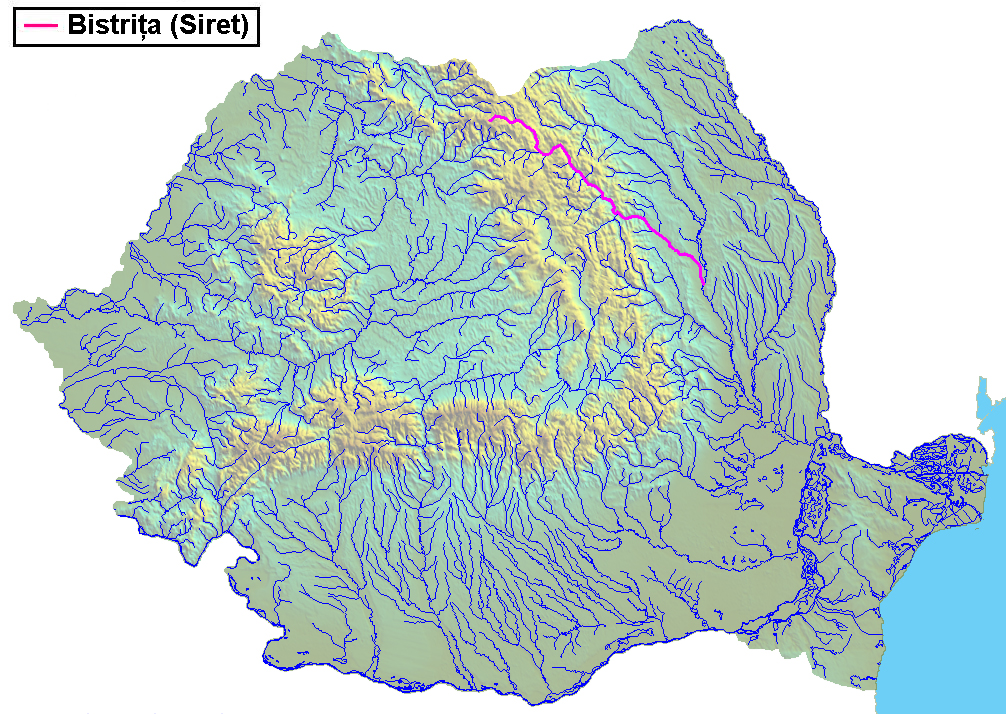
- Course of the Bistrița in Romania

Location
- Country: Romania
- Counties: Bistrița-Năsăud, Suceava, Neamț, Bacău
- Towns: Vatra Dornei, Piatra Neamț, Buhuși, Bacău

Physical characteristics
- Source
  - location: Rodna Mountains
  - elevation: 1,649 m (5,410 ft)
- Mouth: Siret
  - location: Galbeni
  - coordinates: 46°29′28″N 26°59′13″E
  - elevation: 134 m (440 ft)
- Length: 283 km (176 mi)
- Basin size: 7,039 km^{2} (2,718 sq mi)
- Discharge
  - average: 66 m^{3}/s (2,300 cu ft/s)

Basin features
- Progression: Siret→ Danube→ Black Sea
- Tributaries
  - left: Cracău
  - right: Dorna, Bistricioara, Bicaz

The Bistrița (Romanian pronunciation: [ˈbistritsa]), also called Bistrița Aurie or Bistrița Moldoveană (Hungarian: Aranyos-Beszterce), is a river in the Romanian regions of Maramureș, Bukovina and Moldavia (most of its length). It is a right tributary of the river Siret. At Chetriș, near Bacău, it flows into the Siret. Its source is in the Rodna Mountains, at the foot of the Gârgalău Peak. It flows through the counties Bistrița-Năsăud, Suceava, Neamț, and Bacău. The towns Vatra Dornei, Bicaz, Piatra Neamț, Roznov, Buhuși, and Bacău lie along the Bistrița. The Bistrița is 283 km (176 mi) long, and its basin area is 7,039 km^{2} (2,718 sq mi).

The upper reach is also known as Bistrița Aurie (German: Goldene Bistritz).

The following dams have been constructed on the river Bistrița:

- Topoliceni
- Izvorul Muntelui
- Pângărați
- Vaduri
- Piatra Neamț
- Reconstrucția
- Racova
- Gârleni
- Lilieci
- Bacău

== Towns and villages ==
The following towns and villages are situated along the river Bistrița, from source to mouth: Șesuri, Cârlibaba Nouă, Valea Stânei, Botoș, Ciocănești, Iacobeni, Argestru, Vatra Dornei, Cozănești, Ortoaia, Gheorghițeni, Rusca, Sunători, Chiril, Cojoci, Satu Mare, Crucea, Holda, Holdița, Broșteni, Lungeni, Frasin, Mădei, Pârâul Cârjei, Borca, Soci, Pârâul Pântei, Bușmei, Farcașa, Popești, Frumosu, Pârâul Fagului, Săvinești, Galu, Poiana Teiului, Topoliceni, Roșeni, Poiana Largului, Călugăreni, Bistricioara, Ceahlău, Chirițeni, Grozăvești, Buhalnița, Ruginești, Izvoru Alb, Bicaz, Capșa, Tarcău, Straja, Oanțu, Pângărați, Preluca, Vaduri, Viișoara, Agârcia, Doamna, Piatra Neamț, Văleni, Cut, Dumbrava Roșie, Brășăuți, Săvinești, Roznov, Șovoaia, Zănești, Ruseni, Podoleni, Rediu, Costișa, Frunzeni, Buhuși, Blăgești, Racova, Buda, Gura Văii, Gârlenii de Sus, Gârleni, Itești, Lilieci, Bacău, Galbeni.

== Tributaries ==
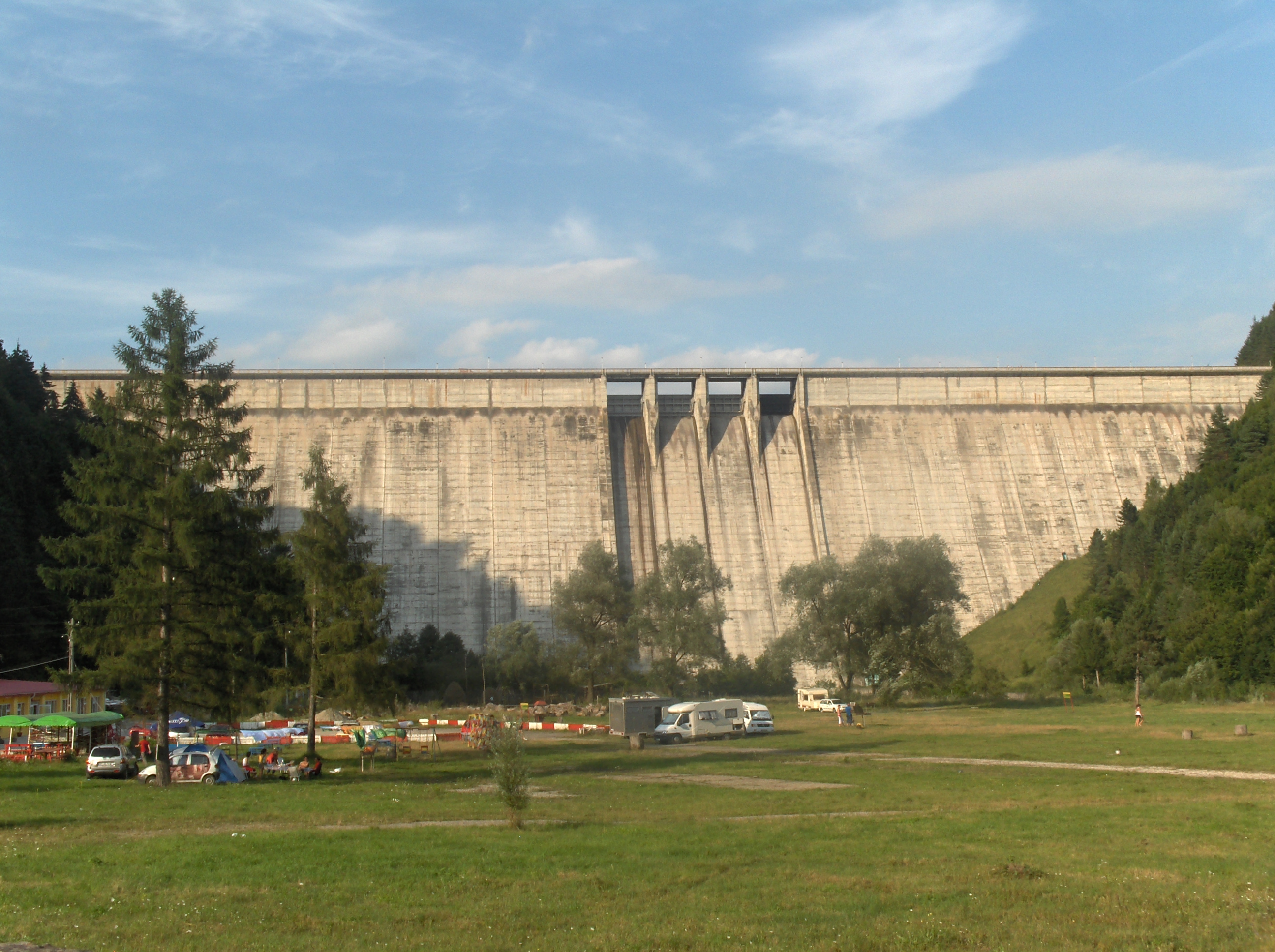
Izvorul Muntelui Dam, 127 meters high, built between 1950 and 1960 on Bistrița River led to the formation of Lake Izvorul Muntelui

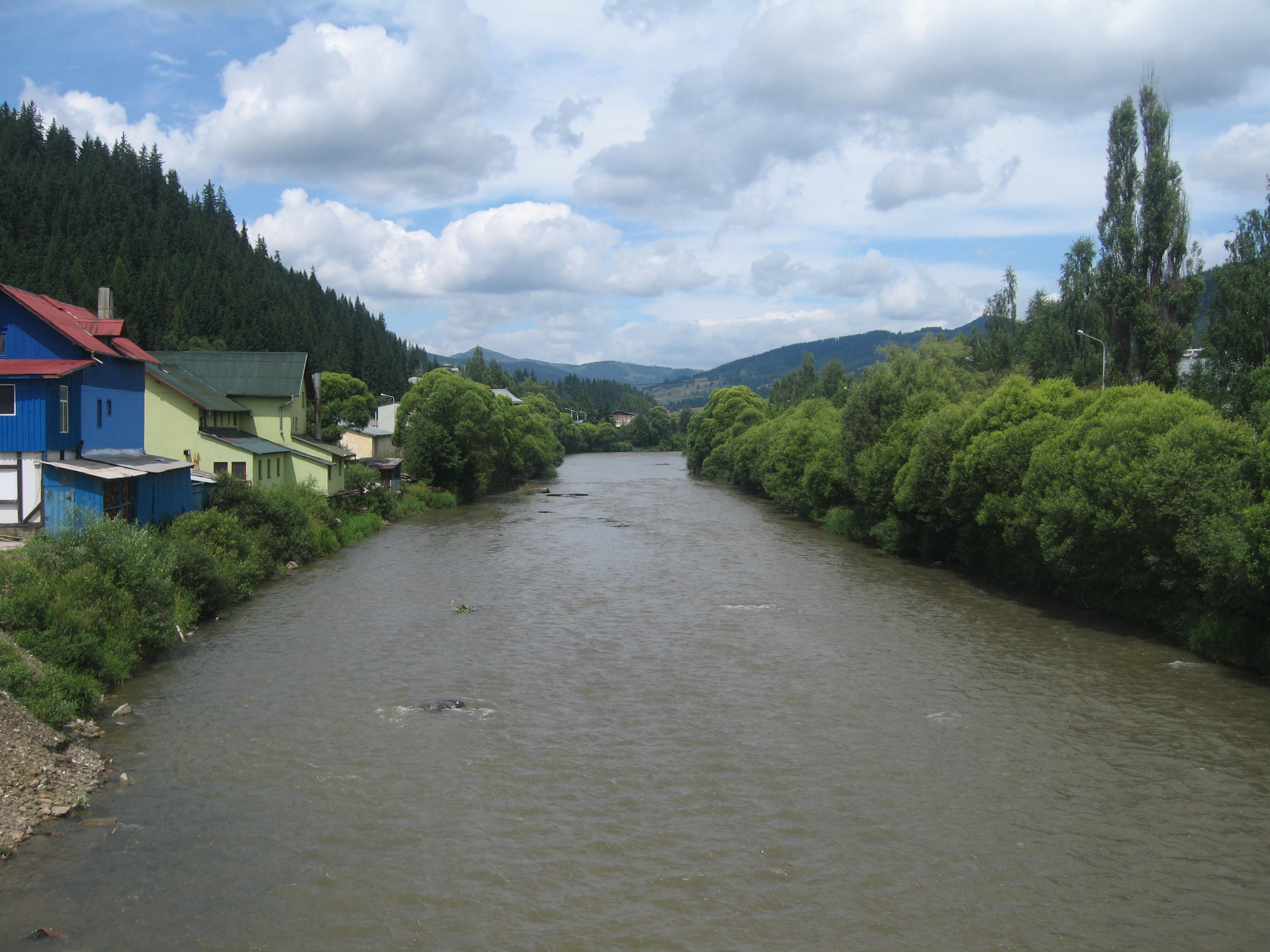
Bistrița Aurie in Vatra Dornei

The following rivers are tributaries to the river Bistrița (from source to mouth):

- Left: Bârjaba, Vulcănescu, Mostim, Tinosu Mare, Iurescu, Bretila, Țibău, Cârlibaba, Afinetu, Valea Stânei, Andronic, Botoș, Gropăria, Oița, Brezuța, Fieru, Argestru, Chilia, Biliceni, Gheorghițeni, Rusca, Stânișoara, Călinești, Frumușana, Izvorul Arseneasa, Colbu, Arama, Chiril, Cojoci, Fieru, Pârâul Fagului, Izvorul Casei, Leșu, Holda (or Puzdra), Holdița, Cotârgași, Pietroasa, Sabasa, Fărcașa, Galu, Bolătău, Stâna, Vârlanu, Letești, Hangu, Buhalnița, Potoci, Capșa, Pângărați, Pângărăcior, Valea Mare, Cuejdiu, Frăsinel, Cracău, Câlneș, Români, Lețcana, Racova, Valea Rea.
- Right: Putreda, Tomnatecu Mare, Tomnatecu Mic, Bila, Lala, Rotunda, Izvorul Șes, Zacla, Valea Rusăi, Măgura, Fundoaia, Stânișoara, Valea Bâtcii, Izvorul Gândacului, Diaca, Humor, Scoruș, Pârâul Rece, Suhărzelu Mic, Suhărzelu Mare, Tisa, Ciotina, Haju, Dorna, Neagra, Arin, Cozănești, Ortoaia, Bolătău, Rusca, Oșoiu, Sunători, Valea Lutului, Izvoru Rău, Bârnărel, Pârâul Cornului, Cicul, Bârnaru, Căboaia, Neagra Broștenilor, Borca, Stejar, Dreptul, Ruseni, Zahorna, Roșeni, Pârâul Duruitorilor, Bistricioara, Schit, Răpciunița, Țiflic, Valea Strâmtorilor, Izvorul Alb, Secu, Izvorul Muntelui, Coșușna, Bicaz, Crasnița, Crasna, Potoci, Tarcău, Oanțu, Secu Vaduri, Agârcia, Doamna, Sasca, Calul, Iapa, Nechit, Poloboc, Dragova, Buda, Trebeș.

== See also ==
- Bistrica (disambiguation page) for etymology and similarly named geographical features
