= Tomnatecu River =

Tomnatecu River may refer to the following rivers in Romania:

- Tomnatecu, a tributary of the Bârnar in Suceava County
- Tomnatec, a tributary of the Neagra Broștenilor in Harghita County
- Tomnatecu, a tributary of the Râul Mare in Alba County
