= Vădurele =

Vădurele may refer to several villages in Romania:

- Vădurele, a village in Alexandru cel Bun Commune, Neamț County
- Vădurele, a village in Cândești Commune, Neamț County
- Vădurele, a village in Năpradea Commune, Sălaj County
