= Izvorul Muntelui =

Izvorul Muntelui may refer to the following places in Romania:

- Izvorul Muntelui, a village in the commune Bicaz, Neamț County
- Lake Izvorul Muntelui, a large artificial lake in Neamț County
- Izvorul Muntelui (river), a tributary of the Bistrița in Neamț County
