= Câlneș =

Câlneș Bahna
- Location within Romania

Location
- Country: Romania
- Counties: Neamț County
- Villages: Dochia, Traian, Podoleni, Mănoaia

Physical characteristics
- Mouth: Bistrița
  - coordinates: 46.7647°N 26.6138°E
- Length: 23 km (14 mi)
- Basin size: 157 km^{2} (61 sq mi)

Basin features
- Progression: Bistrița→ Siret→ Danube→ Black Sea
- Tributaries
  - left: Bahnița, Celac, Verdele
  - right: Văleni

The Câlneș (also: Bahna) is a left tributary of the river Bistrița in Romania. It flows into the Bistrița near Mănoaia. Its length is 23 km (14 mi) and its basin size is 157 km^{2} (61 sq mi).
