= Țârdenii =

Țârdenii may refer to one of two places in Romania:

- Țârdenii Mari, a village in Blăgești Commune, Bacău County
- Țârdenii Mici, a village in Cândești Commune, Neamț County
