= Râul Mare =

Râul Mare may refer to the following rivers in Romania:

- Râul Mare (Bârsa), tributary of the Bârsa in Brașov County
- Râul Mare, another name for the upper course of the Cibin in Sibiu County
- Râul Mare (Cugir), headwater of the Cugir River in Alba County
- Râul Mare, another name for the Cosău in Maramureș County
- Râul Mare (Strei), tributary of the Strei in Hunedoara County
- Râul Mare, tributary of the Țibău in Suceava County

== See also ==
- Pârâul Mare (disambiguation)
