= Dranița River =

Dranița River may refer to:

- Dranița, a tributary of the Camenca in Bacău County
- Dranița, a tributary of the Bârnărel in Suceava County
