= Dragova =

- Location within Romania

Location
- Country: Romania
- Counties: Neamț, Bacău
- Villages: Vădurele, Cândești, Dragova

Physical characteristics
- Mouth: Bistrița
  - location: Buhuși
  - coordinates: 46°42′36″N 26°40′43″E
- Length: 24 km (15 mi)
- Basin size: 124 km^{2} (48 sq mi)

Basin features
- Progression: Bistrița→ Siret→ Danube→ Black Sea
- Tributaries
  - right: Valea lui Ion, Blăgești

The Dragova is a right tributary of the river Bistrița in Romania. It flows into the Bistrița in Buhuși. Its length is 24 km (15 mi) and its basin size is 124 km^{2} (48 sq mi).
