= Celac =

Celac or CELAC may refer to:

- CELAC, the Community of Latin American and Caribbean States, a regional bloc
- Celac River, a tributary of the Câlneș River in Romania
- Sergiu Celac (born 1939), Romanian diplomat
- Mariana Celac, Romanian member of the non-governmental organization Group for Social Dialogue
- Conférence Episcopale du Laos et du Cambodge (CELAC), the Episcopal Conference of Laos and Cambodia
