= Șandru =

Șandru may refer to:

- Șandru, the former name of Papiu Ilarian commune in Mureș County, Romania
- Șandru, a tributary of the Bârnărel in Suceava County, Romania
- Șandru, a tributary of the Moldova in Suceava County, Romania

== Family name ==
- Lavinia Șandru (born 1975), a Romanian politician
- Miroslava Șandru (1916-1983), Romanian folklorist

== See also ==
- Șandra, the name of two villages in Romania
- Sándor (disambiguation)
