= Surina =

Surina may refer to:

- Surina, ancient Etruscan city in present-day Viterbo, Italy.
- Surina, ancient Etruscan city in present-day Soriano nel Cimino, Italy.
- Șurina, village in Gârleni, Bacău County, Romania
