= Betești =

Beteşti or Beţeşti may refer to several villages in Romania:

- Beteşti, a village in the town of Cristuru Secuiesc, Harghita County
- Beţeşti, a village in Rediu, Neamț
