= Pârâul Mănăstirii =

Pârâul Mănăstirii is the name of some rivers in Romania:

- Pârâul Mănăstirii (Bistrița) - tributary of the Bistriţa River
- Pârâul Mănăstirii (Olt) - tributary of the Olt River
