= Bolătău (Bistrița) =

Bolătău Largu
- Location within Romania

Location
- Country: Romania
- Counties: Neamț County
- Villages: Petru Vodă, Poiana Largului

Physical characteristics
- Mouth: Bistrița
  - location: Lake Izvorul Muntelui near Poiana Largului
  - coordinates: 47.0911°N 25.9678°E
- Length: 13 km (8.1 mi)
- Basin size: 60 km^{2} (23 sq mi)

Basin features
- Progression: Bistrița→ Siret→ Danube→ Black Sea
- Tributaries
  - left: Mogorogea

The Bolătău (also: Largu) is a left tributary of the river Bistrița in Romania. It flows into Lake Izvorul Muntelui near Poiana Largului. Its length is 13 km (8.1 mi) and its basin size is 60 km^{2} (23 sq mi).
