= Doamna =

Doamna may refer to the following places in Romania:

- Doamna, a village in Piatra Neamț municipality, Neamț County
- Doamna (Bistrița), a tributary of the river Bistrița in Neamț County
- Doamna, a tributary of the river Mureș in Harghita County
