= Durău (disambiguation) =

Durău is a ski resort in north-eastern Romania. Durău may also refer to

- Durău, a tributary of the river Schit in Neamț County, Romania
- Cornel Durău (born 1957), Romanian handball player
