= Sihăstria =

Sihăstria may refer to:

- Sihăstria, a tributary of the Negrișoara in Suceava County, Romania
- Sihăstrie, a tributary of the Vorona in Botoșani County, Romania
