= Schit (Bistrița) =

Schit Slatina
- Location within Romania

Location
- Country: Romania
- Counties: Neamț County
- Villages: Ceahlău

Physical characteristics
- Mouth: Bistrița
  - coordinates: 47.0468°N 25.9635°E
- Length: 13 km (8.1 mi)
- Basin size: 44 km^{2} (17 sq mi)

Basin features
- Progression: Bistrița→ Siret→ Danube→ Black Sea
- Tributaries
  - right: Pârâul lui Martin, Durău, Durăoaș, Ursu, Gheorghe

The Schit (in its upper course also: Slatina) is a right tributary of the river Bistrița in Romania. It discharges into Lake Izvorul Muntelui near the village Ceahlău. Its length is 13 km (8.1 mi) and its basin size is 44 km^{2} (17 sq mi).
