= Cârlibaba (river) =

- Location within Romania

Location
- Country: Romania
- Counties: Suceava
- Villages: Iedu, Cârlibaba

Physical characteristics
- Mouth: Bistrița
  - location: Cârlibaba
  - coordinates: 47°34′15″N 25°07′41″E
  - elevation: 930 m (3,050 ft)
- Length: 25 km (16 mi)
- Basin size: 111 km^{2} (43 sq mi)

Basin features
- Progression: Bistrița→ Siret→ Danube→ Black Sea
- Tributaries
  - left: Juravlia, Găina, Tătarca
  - right: Pucios

The Cârlibaba is a left tributary of the river Bistrița in Romania. It discharges into the Bistrița in the village Cârlibaba. Its length is 25 km (16 mi) and its basin size is 111 km^{2} (43 sq mi).
