= Bolătău =

Bolătău may refer to the following places in Romania:

- Bolătău (Bistrița), a tributary of the Bistrița in Neamț County
- Bolătău, a tributary of the Cracăul Alb in Neamț County
- Bolătău, a village in the commune Zemeș, Bacău County, Romania
