= Sabasa =

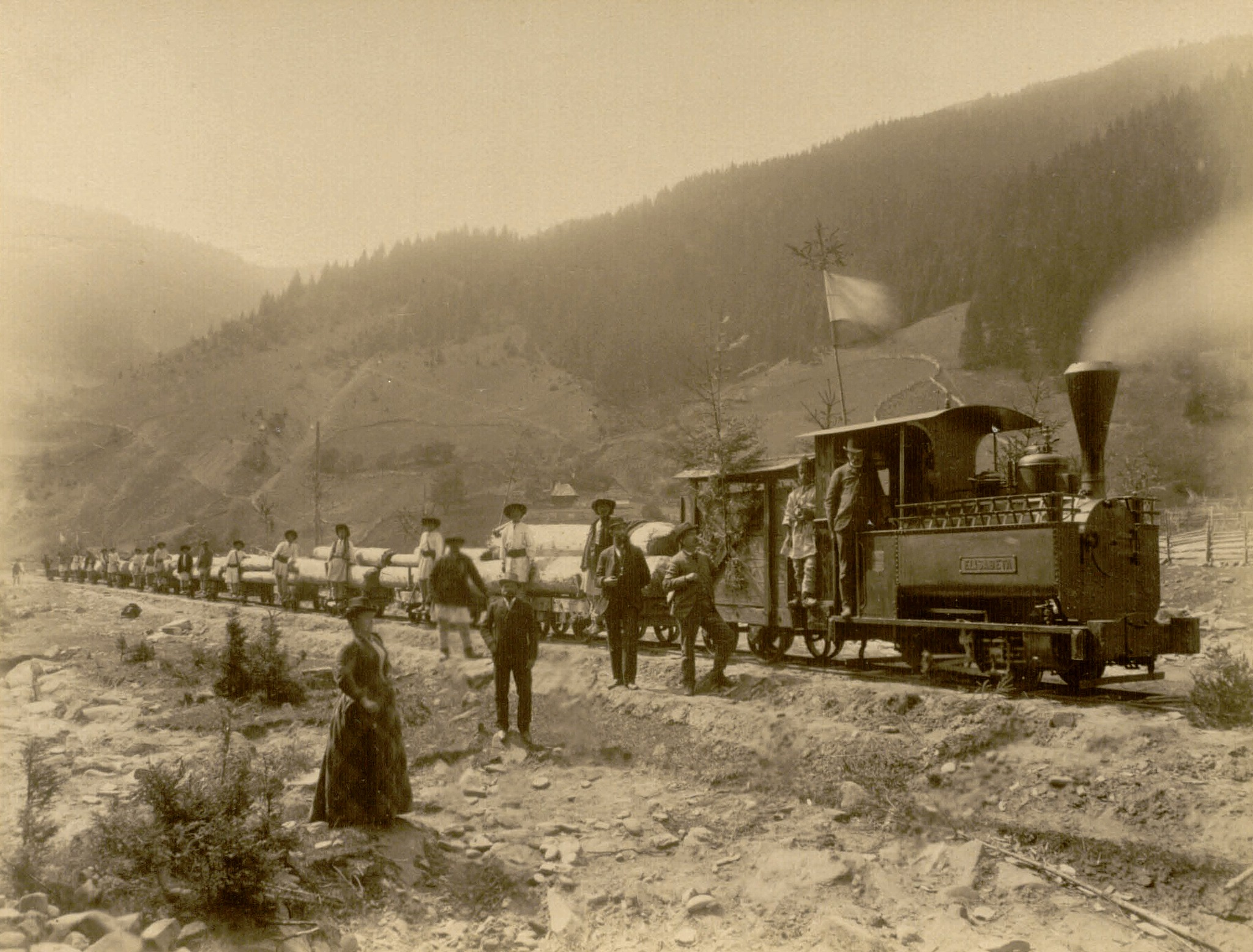
- Logging train pulled by the Couillet locomotive Elisabeta in the Sabasa valley, ca 1895

- Location within Romania

Location
- Country: Romania
- Counties: Neamț County
- Villages: Sabasa

Physical characteristics
- Source: Stânișoara Mountains
- Mouth: Bistrița
  - location: Borca
  - coordinates: 47.1788°N 25.7850°E
- Length: 24 km (15 mi)
- Basin size: 85 km^{2} (33 sq mi)

Basin features
- Progression: Bistrița→ Siret→ Danube→ Black Sea

The Sabasa (also: Sabașa) is a left tributary of the river Bistrița in Romania. It flows into the Bistrița in Borca. Its length is 24 km (15 mi) and its basin size is 85 km^{2} (33 sq mi).
