= Țibău =

River in Romania

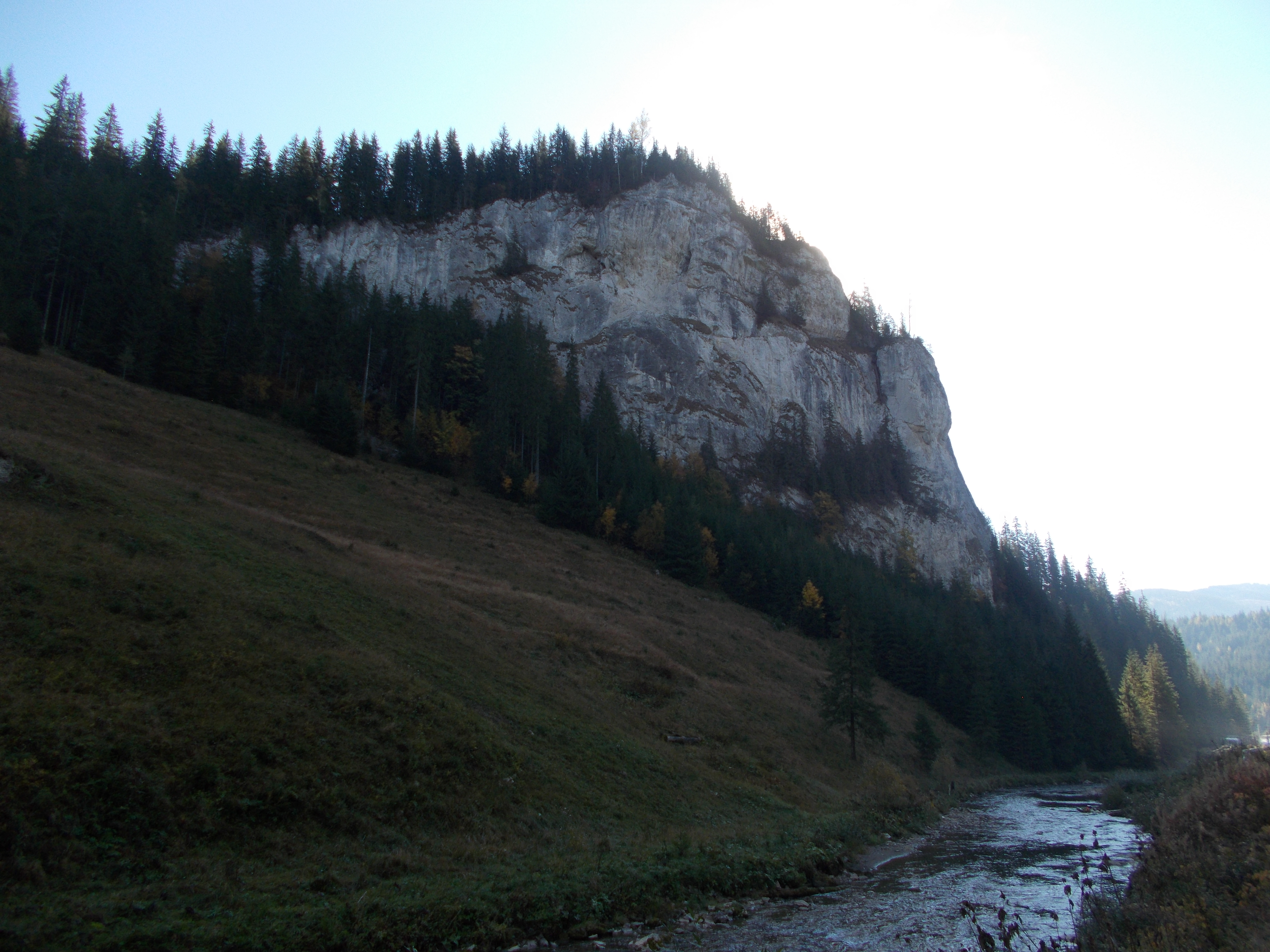

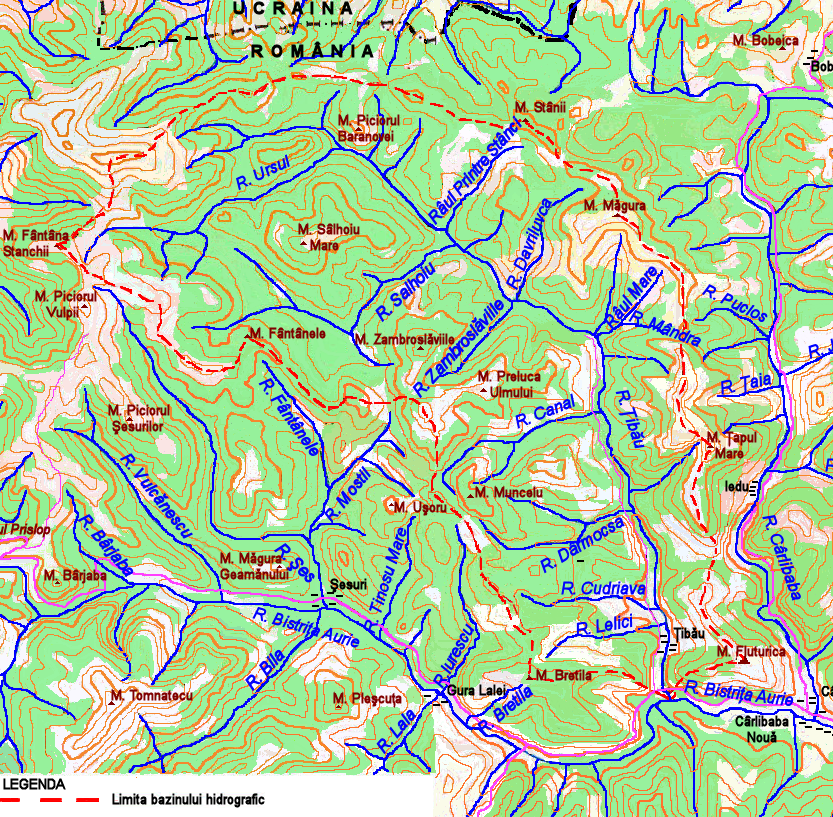
- Map of the Țibău river basin

- Location within Romania

Location
- Country: Romania
- Counties: Maramureș, Suceava
- Villages: Țibău

Physical characteristics
- Mouth: Bistrița
  - location: Downstream of Țibău
  - coordinates: 47°34′30″N 25°04′40″E
- Length: 23 km (14 mi)
- Basin size: 136 km^{2} (53 sq mi)

Basin features
- Progression: Bistrița→ Siret→ Danube→ Black Sea

The Țibău is a left tributary of the river Bistrița in Romania. It discharges into the Bistrița near the village Țibău. Its length is 23 km (14 mi) and its basin size is 136 km^{2} (53 sq mi).

== Tributaries ==
The following rivers are tributaries to the river Țibău (from source to mouth):

- Left: Râul Printre Stânci, Davriluvca, Râul Mare
- Right: Ursul, Sâlhoi, Zambroslăviile, Canalul, Dârmocsa, Cudriava, Lelici
