= Izvorul Muntelui (river) =

- Location within Romania

Location
- Country: Romania
- Counties: Neamț
- Villages: Izvoru Muntelui

Physical characteristics
- Source: Ceahlău Massif
- Mouth: Bistrița
  - coordinates: 46.9347°N 26.1003°E
- Length: 13 km (8.1 mi)
- Basin size: 34 km^{2} (13 sq mi)

Basin features
- Progression: Bistrița→ Siret→ Danube→ Black Sea
- Tributaries
  - right: Pârâul Maicilor, Pârâul Furciturii
- River code: XII.1.53.47

The Izvorul Muntelui is a right tributary of the river Bistrița in Romania. It discharges into the Bistrița downstream from the Izvorul Muntelui dam. Its length is 13 km (8.1 mi) and its basin size is 34 km^{2} (13 sq mi).
