= Rediu, Neamț =

Rediu
- Commune
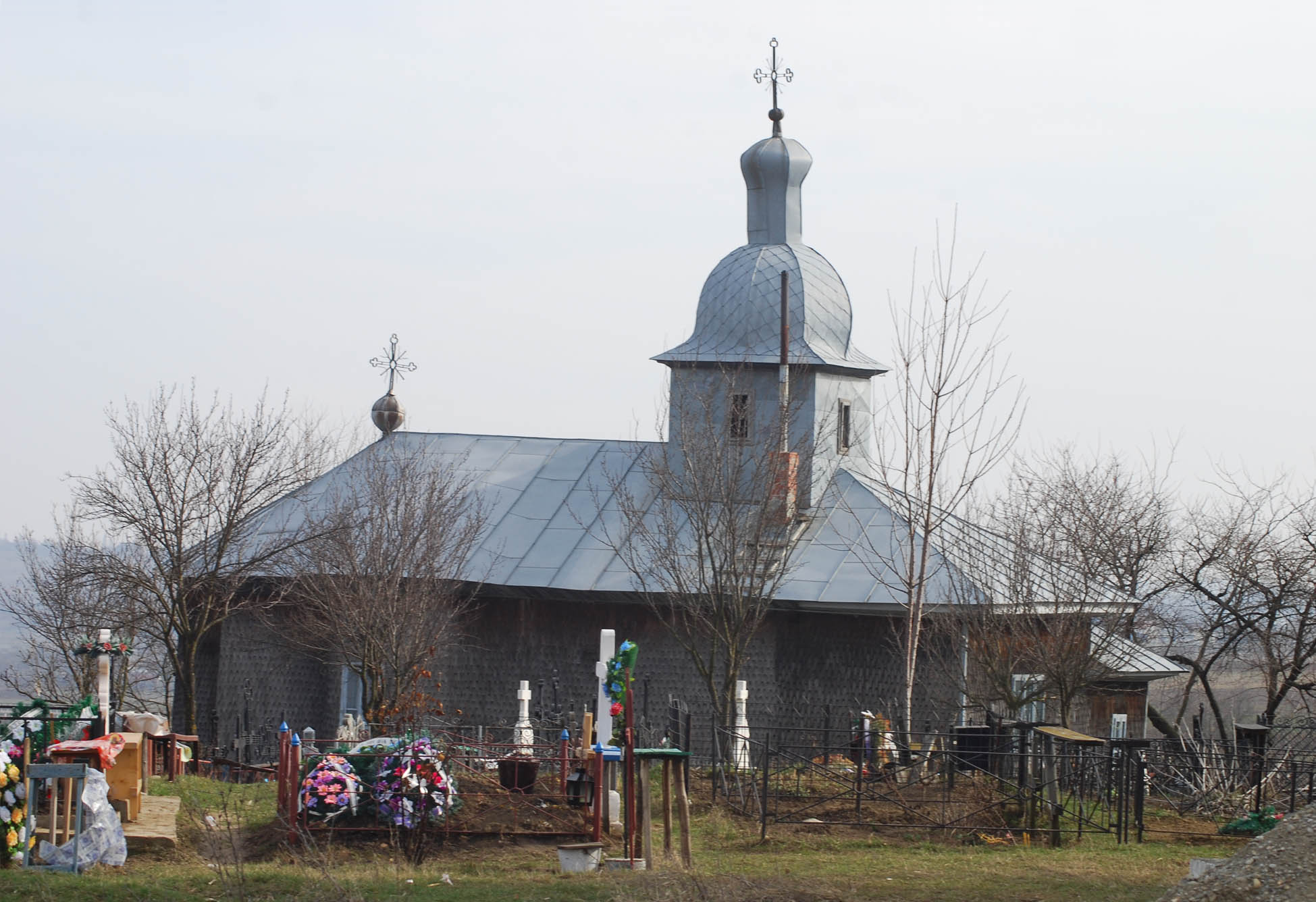
- Saints Voievodes wooden church in Rediu

- Location in Neamț County

- Location in Romania
- Coordinates: 46.758°N 26.566°E
- Country: Romania
- County: Neamț

Government
  - Mayor (2024–2028): Vasile Motfolea (PSD)
- Area: 36.04 km^{2} (13.92 sq mi)
- Elevation: 277 m (909 ft)
- Population (2021-12-01): 4,594
  - Density: 127.5/km^{2} (330.1/sq mi)
- Time zone: UTC+02:00 (EET)
  - Summer (DST): UTC+03:00 (EEST)
- Postal code: 617380
- Area code: +(40) 233
- Vehicle reg.: NT
- Website: rediu.ro

Rediu is a commune in Neamț County, Western Moldavia, Romania. It is composed of four villages: Bețești, Poloboc, Rediu, and Socea.

The commune is located in the southern part of the county, close to the border with Bacău County, on the right bank of the river Bistrița. Rediu is 31 km (19 mi) from the county seat, the city of Piatra Neamț, and 14 km (8.7 mi) from the town of Buhuși. It is crossed by the county road DJ159C, which connects it to the north to Borlești and to the south to Cândești.

The fir beam Saints Voievodes Church dates from around 1825; it is located on a hill in the village of Rediu, next to the village cemetery.

Historical population
Year	Pop.	±%
1992	5,348	—
2002	5,223	−2.3%
2011	4,247	−18.7%
2021	4,594	+8.2%
Source: Census data
