= Bârnaru =

- Location within Romania

Location
- Country: Romania
- Counties: Suceava

Physical characteristics
- Source: Bistrița Mountains
- Mouth: Bistrița
  - coordinates: 47.2848°N 25.6360°E
- Length: 20 km (12 mi)
- Basin size: 93 km^{2} (36 sq mi)

Basin features
- Progression: Bistrița→ Siret→ Danube→ Black Sea
- Tributaries
  - left: Higa, Tomnatecu, Pârâul Sec

The Bârnaru is a right tributary of the river Bistrița in Romania. It flows into the Bistrița between Crucea and Broșteni. Its length is 20 km (12 mi) and its basin size is 93 km^{2} (36 sq mi).
