= Negrișoara (Neagra Broștenilor) =

- Location within Romania

Location
- Country: Romania
- Counties: Suceava County
- Villages: Dârmoxa

Physical characteristics
- Mouth: Neagra Broștenilor
  - coordinates: 47.1737°N 25.6286°E
- Length: 15 km (9.3 mi)
- Basin size: 109 km^{2} (42 sq mi)

Basin features
- Progression: Neagra Broștenilor→ Bistrița→ Siret→ Danube→ Black Sea
- Tributaries
  - left: Sihăstria, Brad, Pin

The Negrișoara is a left tributary of the river Neagra Broștenilor in Romania. It flows west to east through the Bistrița Mountains, and flows into the Neagra Broștenilor southwest of Broșteni. Its length is 15 km (9.3 mi) and its basin size is 109 km^{2} (42 sq mi).
