= Pârâul Mare (disambiguation) =

Pârâul Mare may refer to the following places in Romania:

- Pârâul Mare, a tributary of the Mureș in Arad County
- Pârâul Mare, a tributary of the Bâlta in Gorj County
- Pârâul Mare, a tributary of the Bega Luncanilor in Timiș County
- Pârâul Mare, a tributary of the Lotru in Vâlcea County
- Pârâul Mare, a tributary of the Niraj in Mureș County
- Pârâul Mare, a tributary of the Râmnicel in Vrancea County
- Pârâul Mare, a tributary of the Râul Negru in Covasna County
- Pârâul Mare, a tributary of the Siret in Suceava County
- Pârâul Mare, a village in the commune Ceahlău, Neamț County
- Pârâu Mare, a village in the commune Ibănești, Mureș County
