= Cuejdiu =

- Location within Romania

Location
- Country: Romania
- Counties: Neamț County
- Villages: Cuejdiu, Gârcina, Piatra Neamț

Physical characteristics
- Mouth: Bistrița
  - location: Piatra Neamț
  - coordinates: 46°55′25″N 26°22′3″E
- Length: 24 km (15 mi)
- Basin size: 98 km^{2} (38 sq mi)

Basin features
- Progression: Bistrița→ Siret→ Danube→ Black Sea

The Cuejdiu is a left tributary of the river Bistrița in Romania. It discharges into the Bistrița in Piatra Neamț. Its length is 24 km (15 mi) and its basin size is 98 km^{2} (38 sq mi).
