= Alexandru cel Bun, Neamț =

Alexandru cel Bun
- Commune
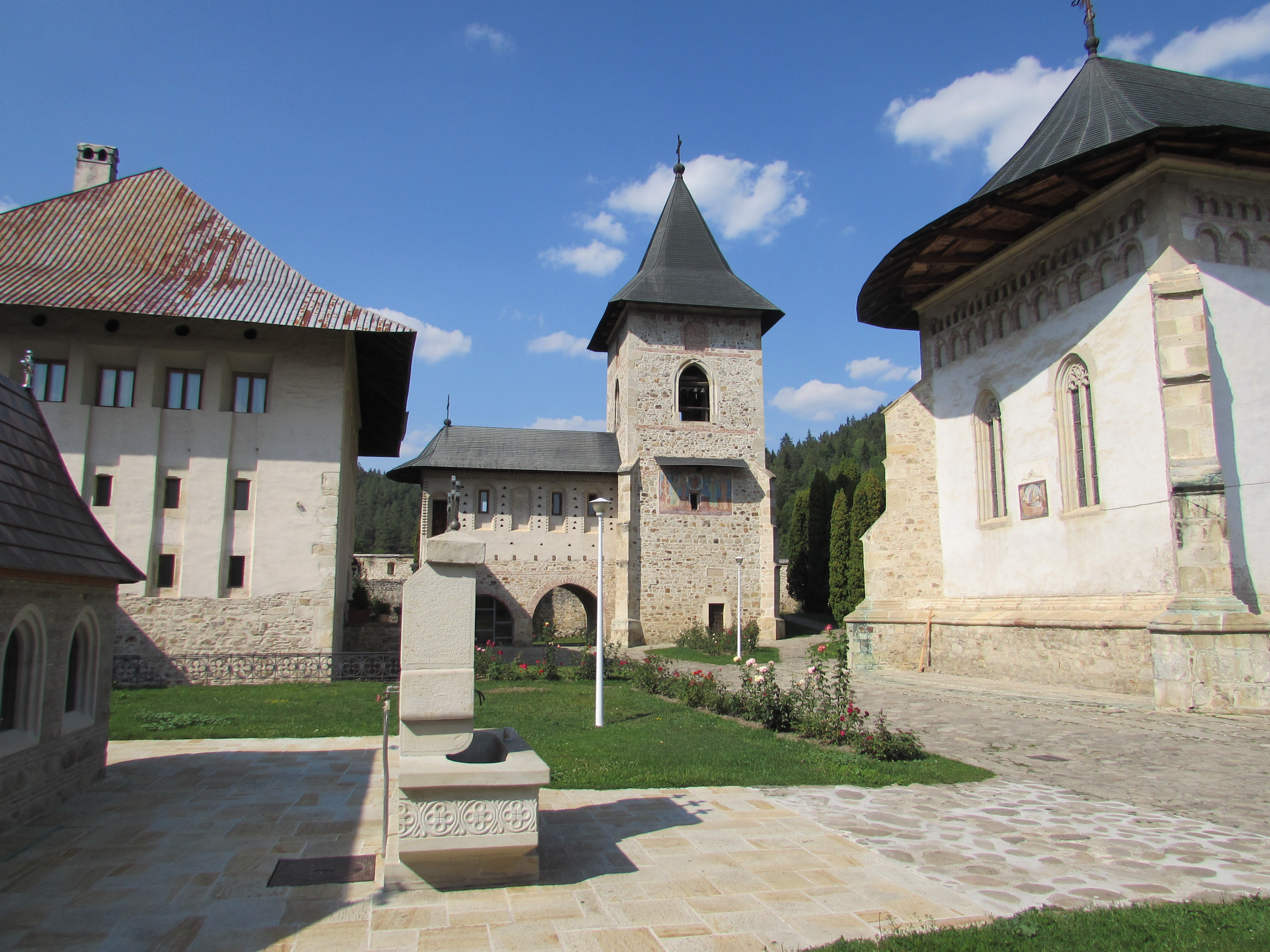
- Bistrița Monastery

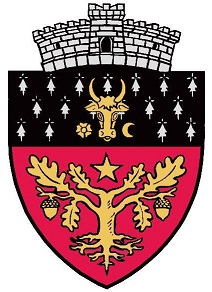
- Coat of arms

- Location in Neamț County

- Location in Romania
- Coordinates: 46°56′31″N 26°16′23″E
- Country: Romania
- County: Neamț

Government
  - Mayor (2020–2024): Ion Rotaru (PNL)
- Area: 75.44 km^{2} (29.13 sq mi)
- Elevation: 352 m (1,155 ft)
- Population (2021-12-01): 5,570
  - Density: 73.8/km^{2} (191/sq mi)
- Time zone: UTC+02:00 (EET)
  - Summer (DST): UTC+03:00 (EEST)
- Postal code: 617505
- Area code: +40 233
- Vehicle reg.: NT
- Website: comunaacb.ro

Alexandru cel Bun is a commune in Neamț County, Western Moldavia, Romania. It was called Viișoara until 2002, when its name was changed. The commune is composed of seven villages: Agârcia, Bisericani, Bistrița, Scăricica, Vaduri, Vădurele, and Viișoara (the commune center).

The commune is located in the central part of Neamț County, just west of the county seat, Piatra Neamț. It lies on the banks of the Bistrița River, amid rolling hills. It is crossed by national road DN15, which connects Piatra Neamț to Bicaz, 20 km (12 mi) to the west of Viișoara, and on to Târgu Mureș. The Bistrița train station used to serve the CFR railway joining Bicaz to Bacău, but has been closed and left in disrepair.

The main attraction is the Bistrița Monastery, a Romanian Orthodox monastery located in Bistrița village. It was dedicated in 1402, having as original ctitor the Moldavian Voivode Alexandru cel Bun, whose remains are buried here.

Historical population
Year	Pop.	±%
1970	5,702	—
1992	4,739	−16.9%
2002	5,055	+6.7%
2011	4,876	−3.5%
2021	5,570	+14.2%
Source: Census data
