= Bârnărel =

- Location within Romania

Location
- Country: Romania
- Counties: Suceava

Physical characteristics
- Source: Bistrița Mountains
- Mouth: Bistrița
  - location: Crucea
  - coordinates: 47.3502°N 25.6049°E
- Length: 13 km (8.1 mi)
- Basin size: 42 km^{2} (16 sq mi)

Basin features
- Progression: Bistrița→ Siret→ Danube→ Black Sea
- Tributaries
  - left: Șandru, Stejioara
  - right: Dranița

The Bârnărel is a right tributary of the river Bistrița in Romania. It flows into the Bistrița in Crucea. Its length is 13 km (8.1 mi) and its basin size is 42 km^{2} (16 sq mi).
