= Dumbrava Roșie =

- Commune
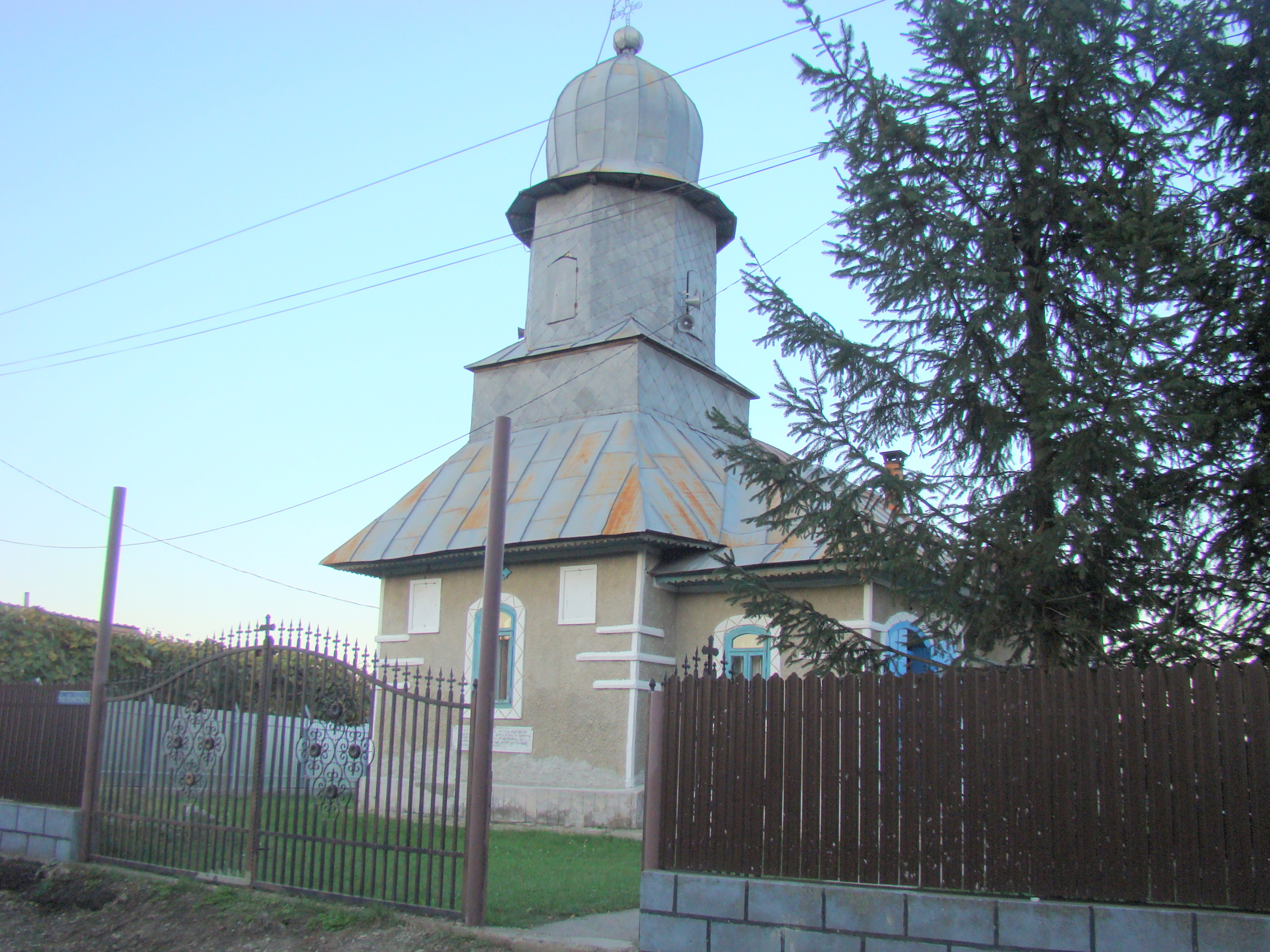
- Wooden church in Brășăuți

- Location in Neamț County

- Location in Romania
- Coordinates: 46.8821°N 26.4395°E
- Country: Romania
- County: Neamț

Government
  - Mayor (2024–2028): Elena Chirițescu (PNL)
- Area: 52.82 km^{2} (20.39 sq mi)
- Elevation: 298 m (978 ft)
- Population (2021-12-01): 7,579
  - Density: 143.5/km^{2} (371.6/sq mi)
- Time zone: UTC+02:00 (EET)
  - Summer (DST): UTC+03:00 (EEST)
- Postal code: 617185
- Area code: +(40) 233
- Vehicle reg.: NT
- Website: primariadvarosie.ro

Dumbrava Roșie is a commune in Neamț County, Western Moldavia, Romania. It is composed of four villages: Brășăuți, Cut, Dumbrava Roșie, and Izvoare.

Historical population
Year	Pop.	±%
1992	6,227	—
2002	7,182	+15.3%
2011	6,759	−5.9%
2021	7,579	+12.1%
Source: Census data
