= Podoleni =

- Commune
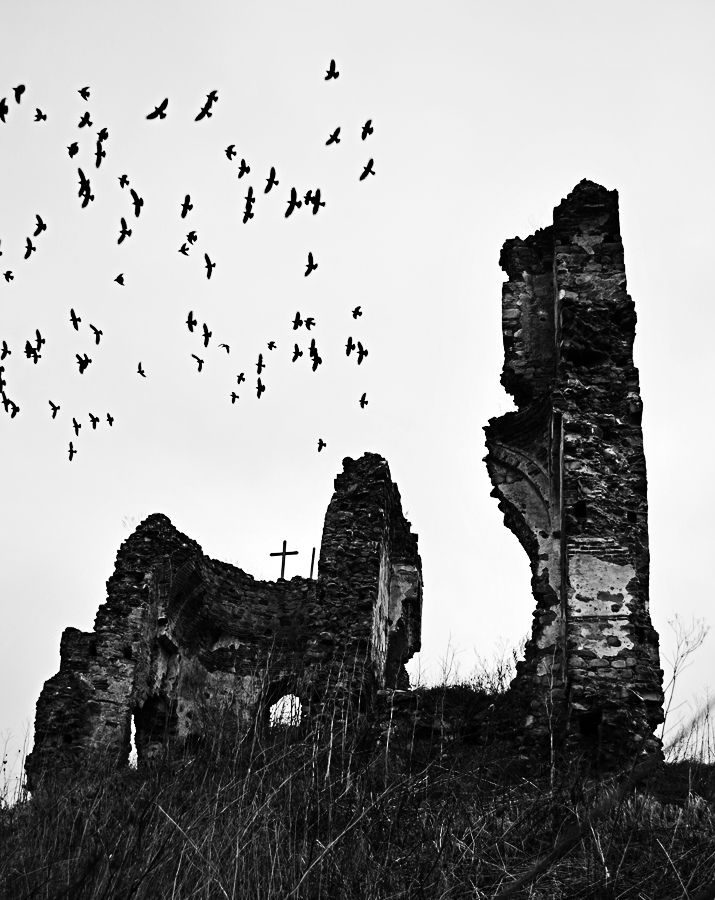
- The ruins of Buciulești Monastery

- Location in Neamț County

- Location in Romania
- Coordinates: 46°47′N 26°37′E
- Country: Romania
- County: Neamț

Government
  - Mayor (2024–2028): Bogdan Buhușanu (PNL)
- Area: 32.02 km^{2} (12.36 sq mi)
- Elevation: 246 m (807 ft)
- Population (2021-12-01): 3,911
  - Density: 122.1/km^{2} (316.3/sq mi)
- Time zone: UTC+02:00 (EET)
  - Summer (DST): UTC+03:00 (EEST)
- Postal code: 617335
- Area code: +(40) 233
- Vehicle reg.: NT
- Website: comunapodoleni.ro

Podoleni is a commune in Neamț County, Western Moldavia, Romania. It is composed of two villages, Negritești and Podoleni.

== Geography ==
The commune lays 25.6 km (15.9 mi) away from the Piatra Neamț municipality, which is the capital of the Neamț County. The commune is 4,017 ha (9,930 acres) in area, the majority of which is dedicated to agricultural use. Only 885 ha (2,190 acres) is designated for "town" use.

== History ==
The village of Podoleni was founded on the bank of the Bistrița river. The villages is first attested in 1479. The Buciulești Monastery was erected in 1630, and has since fallen in to ruin.

== Demographics ==
Historical population
Year	Pop.	±%
1992	5,714	—
2002	5,628	−1.5%
2011	4,196	−25.4%
2021	3,911	−6.8%
Source: Census data

The 2011 Romanian census put the population of Podoleni at 4,196, a decrease from the 2002 census, which recorded the population at 5,628. The majority of the population were ethnically Romanian (96.5%), the remaining population's ethnicity was unknown (3.43%). The majority of the inhabitants (96.4%) were Romanian Orthodox, and 0.1% were Catholic.

At the 2021 census, Podoleni had a population of 3,911, of which 88.06% were Romanians.
