= Farcașa =

- Commune
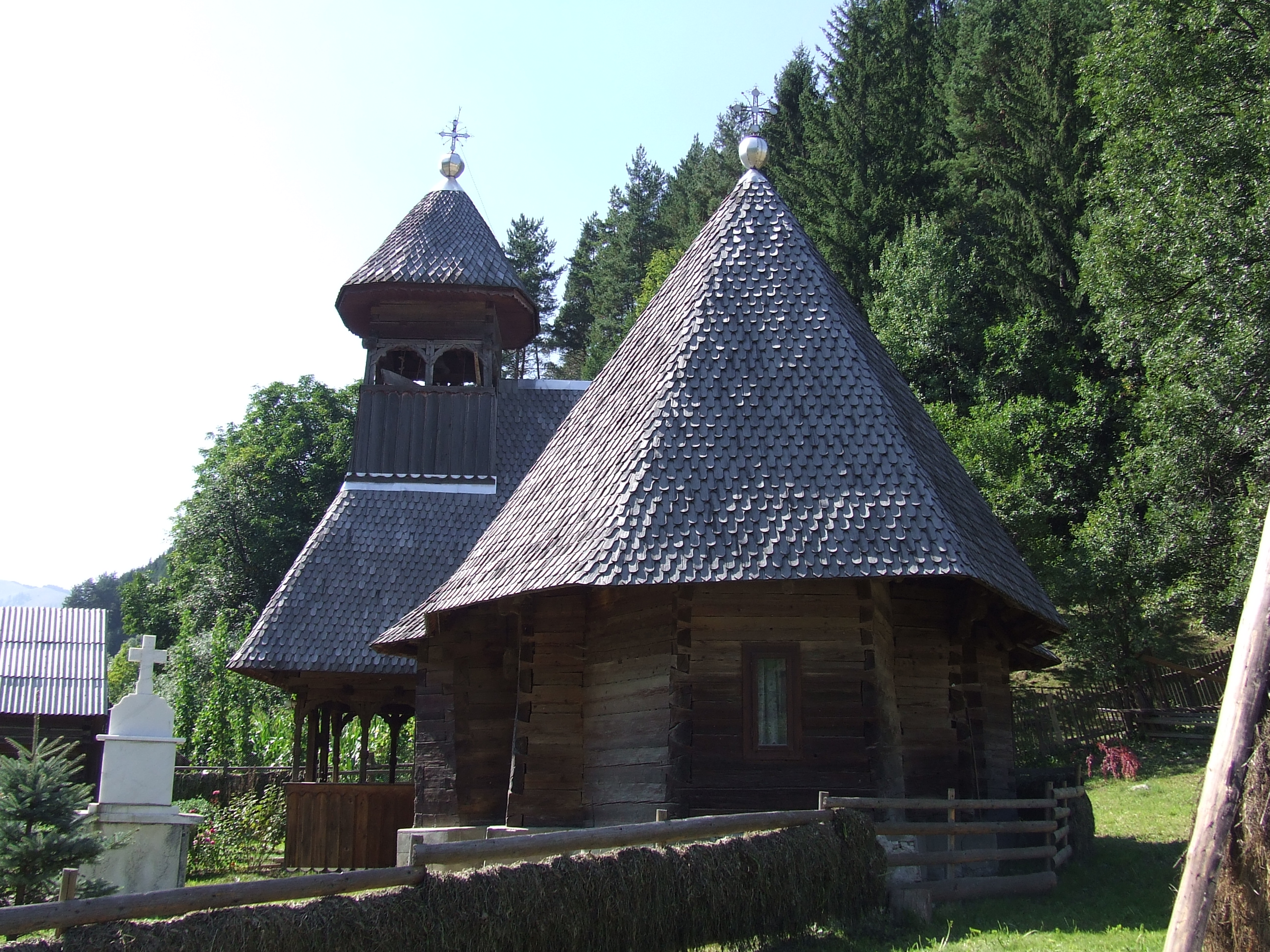
- Wooden church in Farcașa village

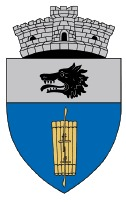
- Coat of arms

- Location in Neamț County

- Location in Romania
- Coordinates: 47°09′N 25°50′E
- Country: Romania
- County: Neamț

Government
  - Mayor (2020–2026): Dumitru-Bogdan Țifui (PNL)
- Area: 92.32 km^{2} (35.64 sq mi)
- Elevation: 585 m (1,919 ft)
- Highest elevation: 621 m (2,037 ft)
- Lowest elevation: 540 m (1,770 ft)
- Population (2021-12-01): 2,812
  - Density: 30.46/km^{2} (78.89/sq mi)
- Time zone: UTC+02:00 (EET)
  - Summer (DST): UTC+03:00 (EEST)
- Postal code: 617190
- Area code: +(40) 233
- Vehicle reg.: NT
- Website: primariafarcasa.ro

Farcașa is a commune in Neamț County, Western Moldavia, Romania. It is composed of five villages: Bușmei, Farcașa, Frumosu, Popești, and Stejaru.

Historical population
Year	Pop.	±%
1992	3,105	—
2002	3,194	+2.9%
2011	2,866	−10.3%
2021	2,812	−1.9%
Source: Census data
