= Zănești =

- Commune
- Location in Neamț County

- Location in Romania
- Coordinates: 46°49′N 26°33′E
- Country: Romania
- County: Neamț

Government
  - Mayor (2024–2028): Ioan Filip (PSD)
- Area: 34.07 km^{2} (13.15 sq mi)
- Elevation: 261 m (856 ft)
- Population (2021-12-01): 4,990
  - Density: 146/km^{2} (379/sq mi)
- Time zone: UTC+02:00 (EET)
  - Summer (DST): UTC+03:00 (EEST)
- Postal code: 617515
- Area code: +(40) 233
- Vehicle reg.: NT
- Website: www.comunazanesti.ro

Zănești is a commune in Neamț County, Western Moldavia, Romania. It is composed of two villages, Traian and Zănești.

The commune is located on the banks of the Bistrița River, in the southern part of the county, 20 km (12 mi) southeast of the county seat, Piatra Neamț. It is traversed by national road DN15, which connects Piatra Neamț to Bacău.

Historical population
| Year | Pop. | ±% |
|---|---|---|
| 1992 | 6,150 | — |
| 2002 | 6,136 | −0.2% |
| 2011 | 4,902 | −20.1% |
| 2021 | 4,990 | +1.8% |
Source: Census data
