= Poiana Teiului =

- Commune
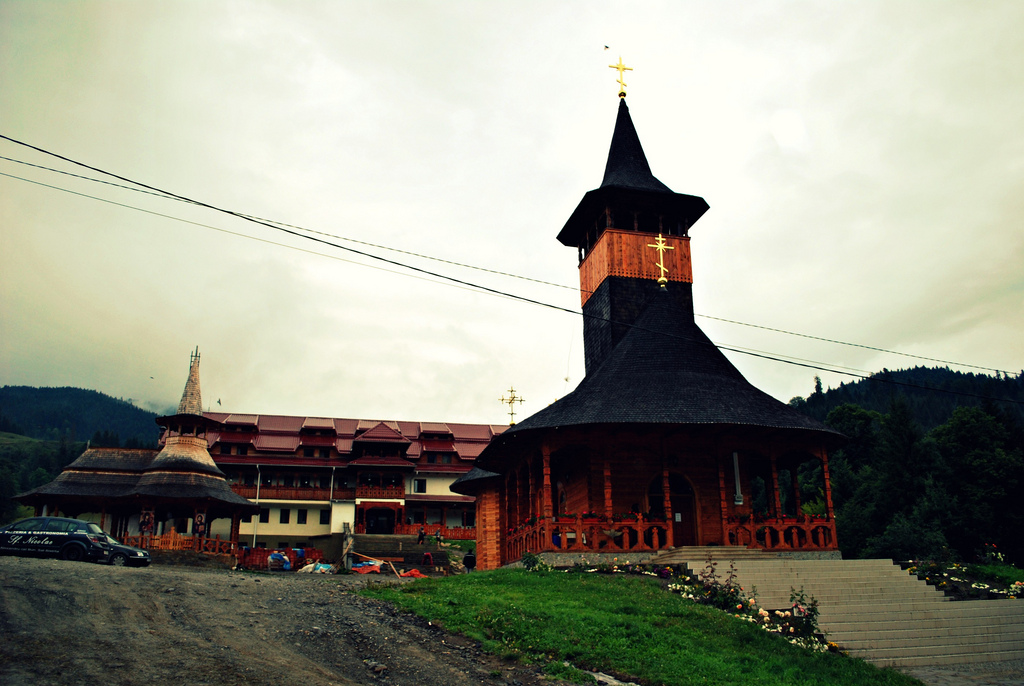
- St. George Church in Petru Vodă village

- Location in Neamț County

- Location in Romania
- Coordinates: 47°6′N 25°58′E
- Country: Romania
- County: Neamț

Government
  - Mayor (2024–2028): Alexandru-Teodor Chirilă (PNL)
- Area: 162 km^{2} (63 sq mi)
- Elevation: 545 m (1,788 ft)
- Population (2021-12-01): 4,089
  - Density: 25.2/km^{2} (65.4/sq mi)
- Time zone: UTC+02:00 (EET)
  - Summer (DST): UTC+03:00 (EEST)
- Postal code: 617340
- Area code: +(40) 233
- Vehicle reg.: NT
- Website: poianateiului.ro

Poiana Teiului is a commune in Neamț County, Western Moldavia, Romania. It is composed of eleven villages: Călugăreni, Dreptu, Galu, Petru Vodă, Pârâul Fagului, Poiana Largului, Poiana Teiului, Roșeni, Ruseni, Săvinești, and Topoliceni.

The village of Poiana Largului is located at the north end of Lake Bicaz, at the junction of several national roads (DN15, DN15B, and DN17B). It has a viaduct, erected over the last section of the lake.

The Petru Vodă Monastery can be reached from Poiana Largului by following a 10 km (6.2 mi) dirt road. The tombs of father Gheorghe Calciu-Dumitreasa and poet Radu Gyr are located there.

Historical population
Year	Pop.	±%
1992	5,268	—
2002	5,237	−0.6%
2011	4,451	−15.0%
2021	4,089	−8.1%
Source: Census data
