= Ciocănești, Suceava =

Ciocănești German: Czokanestie
- Commune
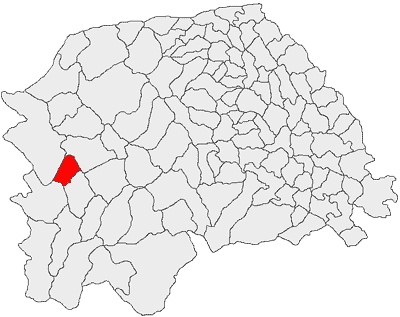
- Location in Suceava County

- Location in Romania
- Coordinates: 47°29′N 25°17′E
- Country: Romania
- County: Suceava
- Subdivisions: Ciocănești, Botoș

Government
  - Mayor (2024–2028): Radu Ciocan (PNL)
- Area: 107 km^{2} (41 sq mi)
- Elevation: 855 m (2,805 ft)
- Population (2021-12-01): 1,427
  - Density: 13/km^{2} (35/sq mi)
- Time zone: EET/EEST (UTC+2/+3)
- Postal code: 727120
- Area code: +40 x30
- Vehicle reg.: SV

Ciocănești (German: Czokanestie) is a commune located in Suceava County, in the historical region of Bukovina, northeastern Romania. It is composed of two villages, more specifically Botoș and Ciocănești. These were part of Iacobeni (German: Jakobeny) commune until 2002, when they were split off.

== History ==
Historical affiliations

Moldavia (1388–1775)
Habsburg Monarchy (1775–1804)
Austrian Empire (1804–1867)
Austria-Hungary, Cisleithania (1867–1918)
Kingdom of Romania (1918–1947)
Romanian People's Republic (1947–1965)
Socialist Republic of Romania (1965–1989)
Romania (1989–present)

As it is the case of other rural settlements from Suceava County, Ciocănești (German: Czokanestie) was inhabited by a sizeable German community, the Zipser Germans (part of the larger Bukovina German community) during the modern period up until the mid-20th century, starting as early as the Habsburg period and, later on, the Austro-Hungarian period.

== Administration and local politics ==
=== Communal council ===
The commune's current local council has the following political composition, according to the results of the 2020 Romanian local elections:

Party	Seats	Current Council
National Liberal Party (PNL)	7	
People's Movement Party (PMP)	1	
Social Democratic Party (PSD)	1	
