= Neagra Broștenilor =

Neagra Broștenilor Neagra
- Location within Romania

Location
- Country: Romania
- Counties: Harghita, Suceava
- Villages: Drăgoiasa, Glodu, Neagra, Broșteni

Physical characteristics
- Mouth: Bistrița
  - location: Broșteni
  - coordinates: 47.2371°N 25.6977°E
- Length: 42 km (26 mi)
- Basin size: 350 km^{2} (140 sq mi)

Basin features
- Progression: Bistrița→ Siret→ Danube→ Black Sea
- Tributaries
  - left: Pârâul Sec, Bolovăniș, Tomnatec, Negrișoara
  - right: Ortoaia

The Neagra Broștenilor (also: Neagra) is a right tributary of the river Bistrița in Romania. It discharges into the Bistrița in the village Neagra, near Broșteni. Its length is 42 km (26 mi) and its basin size is about 350 km^{2} (140 sq mi).
