= Racova =

- Commune
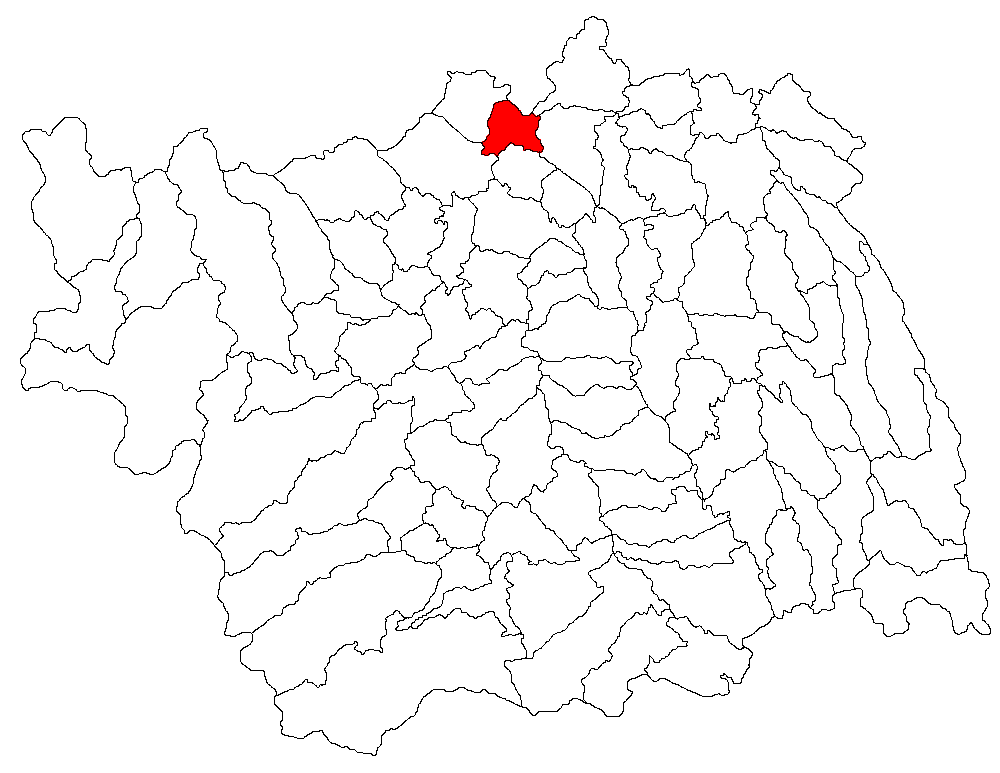
- Location in Bacău County

- Location in Romania
- Coordinates: 46°42′N 26°45′E
- Country: Romania
- County: Bacău

Government
  - Mayor (2024–2028): Cătălin Ionel Apetrei (PNL)
- Area: 34.11 km^{2} (13.17 sq mi)
- Elevation: 244 m (801 ft)
- Population (2021-12-01): 3,433
  - Density: 100.6/km^{2} (260.7/sq mi)
- Time zone: UTC+02:00 (EET)
  - Summer (DST): UTC+03:00 (EEST)
- Postal code: 607475
- Area code: +(40) 0234
- Vehicle reg.: BC
- Website: primariaracova.ro

Racova is a commune in Bacău County, Western Moldavia, Romania. It is composed of four villages: Gura Văii, Hălmăcioaia, Ilieși, and Racova.
