= Doamna (Bistrița) =

- Location within Romania

Location
- Country: Romania
- Counties: Neamț
- Villages: Doamna

Physical characteristics
- Source: Munții Goșmanului
- Mouth: Bistrița
  - location: Bâtca Doamnei Reservoir
  - coordinates: 46°55′55″N 26°19′42″E
- Length: 8 km (5.0 mi)
- Basin size: 22 km^{2} (8.5 sq mi)

Basin features
- Progression: Bistrița→ Siret→ Danube→ Black Sea
- Tributaries
  - left: Opleanu
  - right: Bahrin, Gliguța

The Doamna is a right tributary of the river Bistrița in Romania. It flows into the Bâtca Doamnei Reservoir near Piatra Neamț. Its length is 8 km (5.0 mi) and its basin size is 22 km^{2} (8.5 sq mi).
