= Blăgești, Bacău =

Blăgești
- Commune
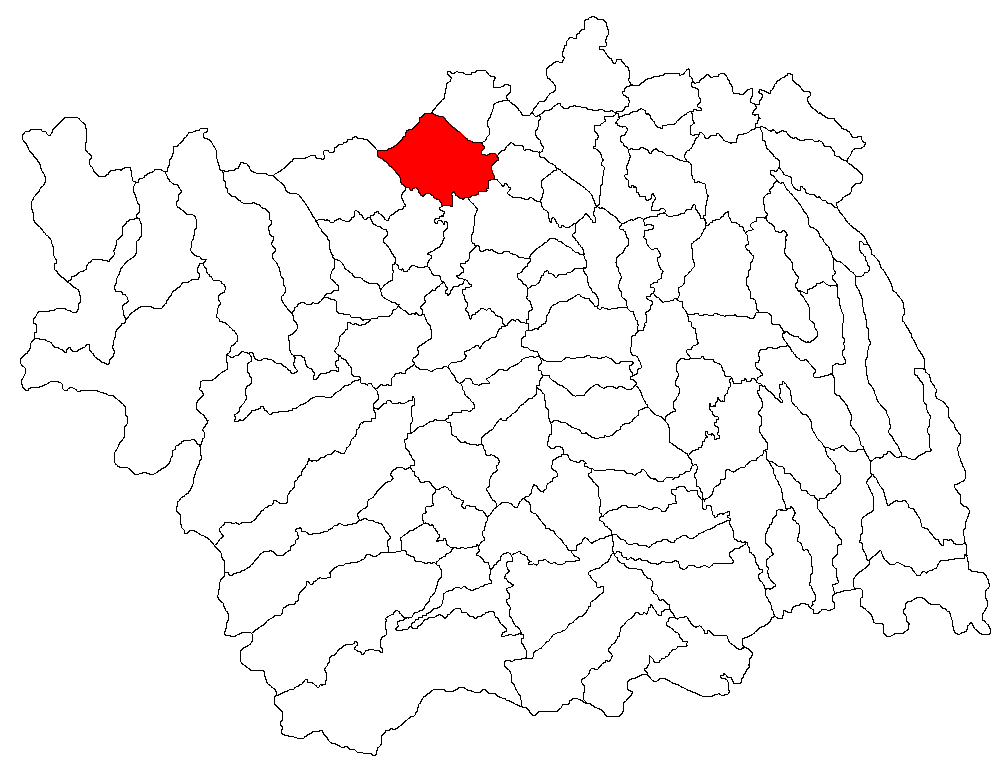
- Location in Bacău County

- Location in Romania
- Coordinates: 46°41′N 26°39′E
- Country: Romania
- County: Bacău

Government
  - Mayor (2020–2024): Laurențiu Munteanu (PSD)
- Area: 96.32 km^{2} (37.19 sq mi)
- Elevation: 224 m (735 ft)
- Population (2021-12-01): 6,815
  - Density: 71/km^{2} (180/sq mi)
- Time zone: EET/EEST (UTC+2/+3)
- Postal code: 607065
- Area code: +(40) 234
- Vehicle reg.: BC
- Website: www.primaria-blagesti.net

Blăgești is a commune in Bacău County, Western Moldavia, Romania. It is composed of five villages: Blăgești, Buda, Poiana Negustorului, Țârdenii Mari, and Valea lui Ion.

Historical population
Year	Pop.	±%
2002	7,240	—
2011	7,080	−2.2%
2021	6,815	−3.7%
Source: Census data
