= Gârleni =

- Commune
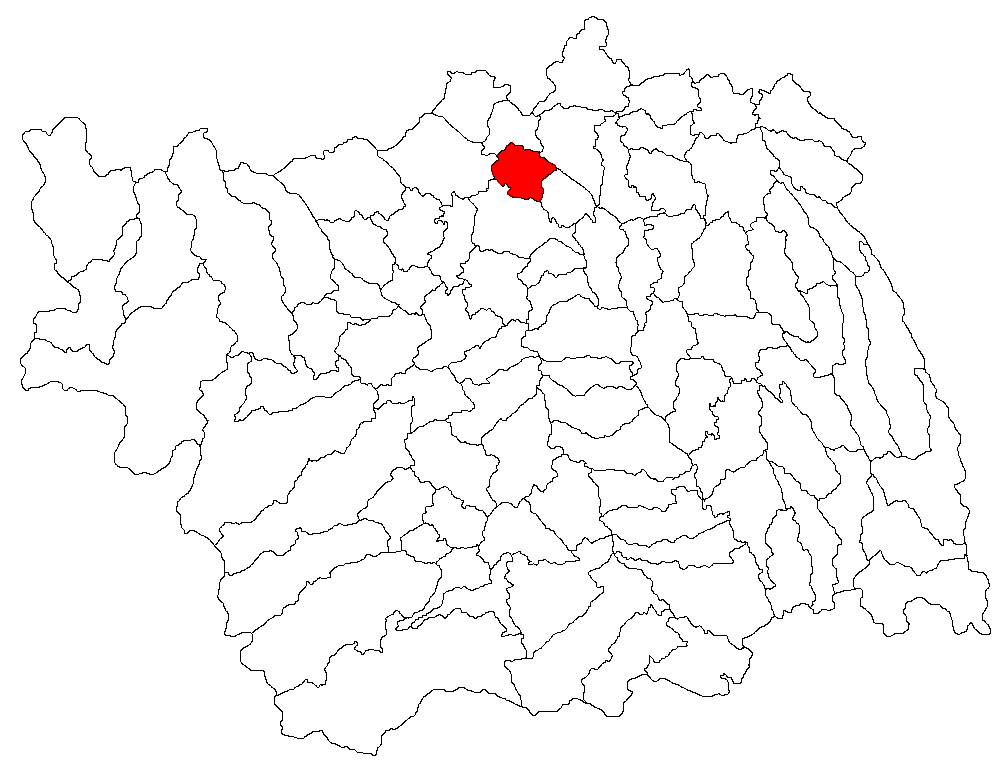
- Location in Bacău County

- Location in Romania
- Coordinates: 46°40′N 26°48′E
- Country: Romania
- County: Bacău

Government
  - Mayor (2024–2028): Ștefan Pușcașu (REPER)
- Area: 35.82 km^{2} (13.83 sq mi)
- Elevation: 188 m (617 ft)
- Population (2021-12-01): 6,081
  - Density: 169.8/km^{2} (439.7/sq mi)
- Time zone: UTC+02:00 (EET)
  - Summer (DST): UTC+03:00 (EEST)
- Postal code: 607201
- Area code: +(40) 0234
- Vehicle reg.: BC
- Website: primariagarleni.ro

Gârleni (Hungarian: Gerlény) is a commune in Bacău County, Western Moldavia, Romania. It is composed of four villages: Gârleni, Gârlenii de Sus (Rácsila; the commune residence), Lespezi (Lészped), and Șurina.

At the 2002 census, the commune had 6,281 inhabitants, of which 98.7% were Romanians, 0.7% Hungarians, and 0.5% Csángós; 64% were Roman Catholic, 35% Romanian Orthodox, and 0.5% Adventists. At the 2021 census, Gârleni had a population of 6,081, of which 87.78% were Romanians.
