= Costișa =

- Commune
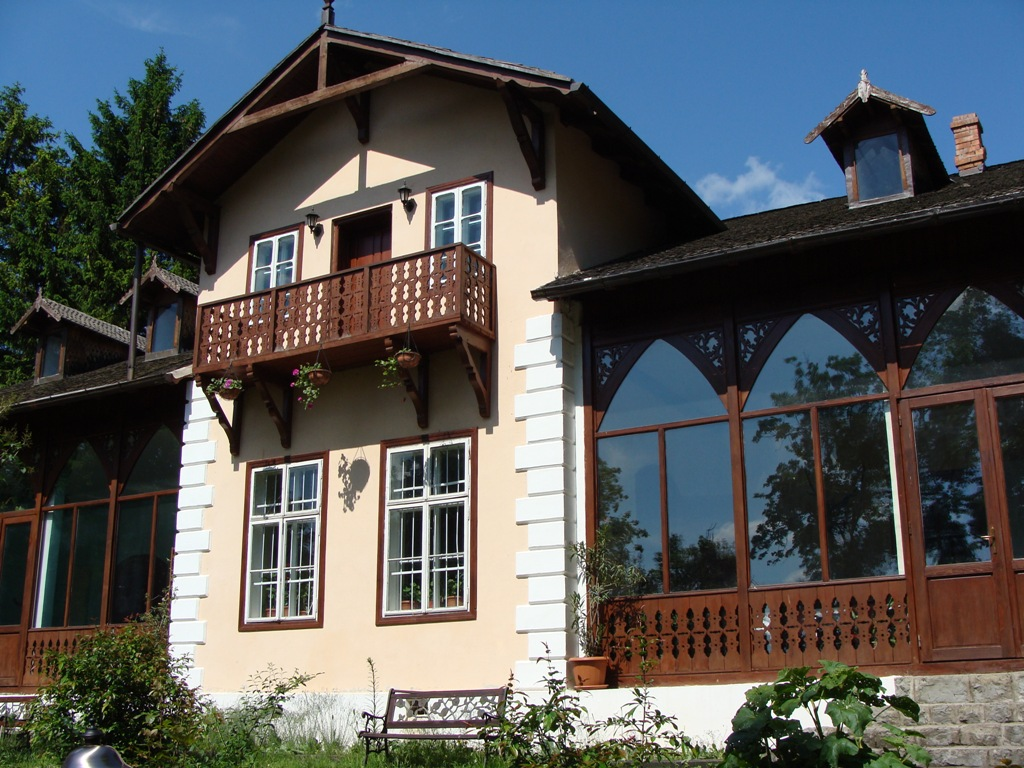
- The Cantacuzino-Pașcanu mansion

- Location in Neamț County

- Location in Romania
- Coordinates: 46°45′N 26°40′E
- Country: Romania
- County: Neamț
- Subdivisions: Costișa, Dornești, Frunzeni, Mănoaia

Government
  - Mayor (2024–2028): Dumitru-Dorel Berbecariu (PSD)
- Area: 26.64 km^{2} (10.29 sq mi)
- Elevation: 251 m (823 ft)
- Population (2021-12-01): 2,747
  - Density: 103.1/km^{2} (267.1/sq mi)
- Time zone: UTC+02:00 (EET)
  - Summer (DST): UTC+03:00 (EEST)
- Postal code: 617140
- Area code: +40 x33
- Vehicle reg.: NT
- Website: www.comunacostisa.ro

Costișa is a commune in Neamț County, Western Moldavia, Romania. It is composed of four villages: Costișa, Dornești, Frunzeni, and Mănoaia.

Historical population
Year	Pop.	±%
1992	3,481	—
2002	3,572	+2.6%
2011	2,883	−19.3%
2021	2,747	−4.7%
Source: Census data
