= Ceahlău, Neamț =

Ceahlău
- Commune
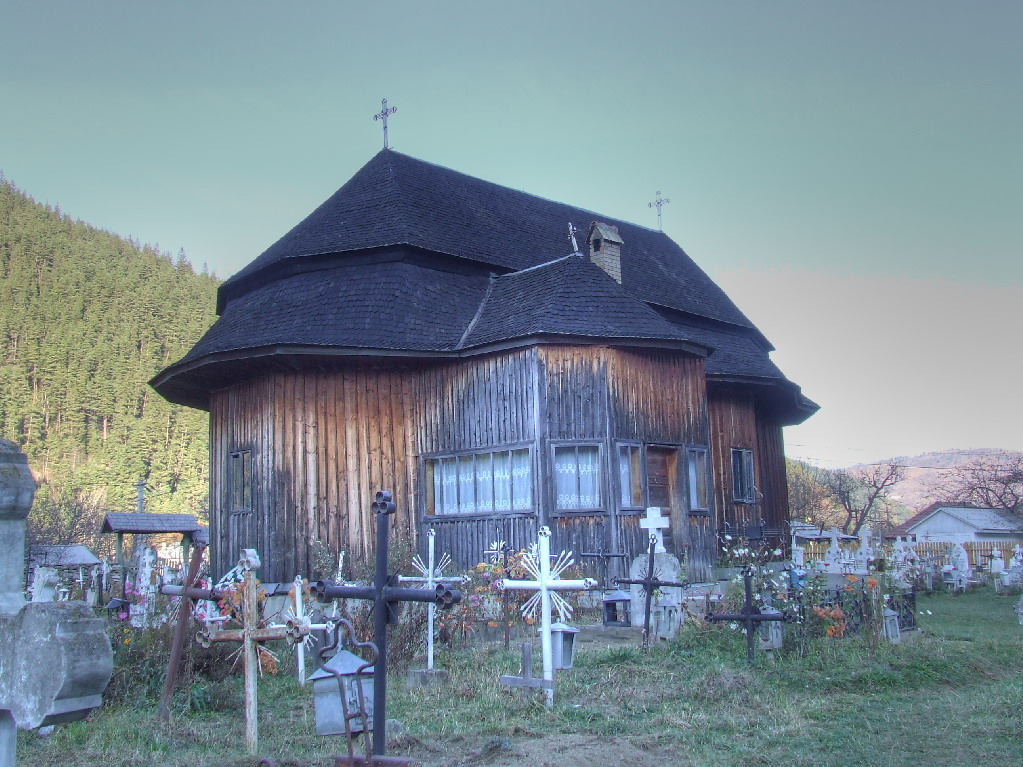
- Wooden church in Bistricioara

- Location in Neamț County

- Location in Romania
- Coordinates: 47°3′N 25°58′E
- Country: Romania
- County: Neamț

Government
  - Mayor (2020–2024): Dumitru Coroamă (PNL)
- Area: 95 km^{2} (37 sq mi)
- Elevation: 508 m (1,667 ft)
- Population (2021-12-01): 2,035
  - Density: 21/km^{2} (55/sq mi)
- Time zone: UTC+02:00 (EET)
  - Summer (DST): UTC+03:00 (EEST)
- Postal code: 617125
- Area code: +40 233
- Vehicle reg.: NT
- Website: www.primariaceahlau.ro

Ceahlău is a commune in Neamț County, Western Moldavia, Romania. It is composed of three villages: Bistricioara, Ceahlău, and Pârâul Mare.

== Attractions ==
In addition to a respectable church at Bistricioara, the village of Ceahlău has a larger 19th century wooden church, with wild swirling spires similar to those at Curtea de Argeș in Argeș County. The village of Ceahlău also features a handful of three and four-star guesthouses and a hotel facing the beautiful Bicaz Lake (Lacul Bicaz or Lacul Izvorul Muntelui, meaning "Mountain Spring Lake").

In addition to a little local general store, the village offers an ethnographic museum, and the remains of a princely castle just up behind the museum. Lodging at Ceahlău is a reasonable alternative to the higher prices of the resort community of Durău further up the river.

== Geography ==
Ceahlău is on the edge of the Ceahlău Massif portion of the Eastern Carpathian Mountains. The village itself runs along the Hermitage Brook (pârâul Schitu), and includes a small portion on the north-west side of the river along Mountain Spring Lake.

== Ceahlău commune ==
Ceahlău commune is made up of three main villages, that of Ceahlău, along with Bistricioara on the main road from Piatra Neamț, and Pârâul Mare ("Big Stream"). All of these villages are sited in the mountains, situated along the main watercourses which flow out of the surrounding peaks and ranges.

=== Ceahlău Village ===
The actual village of Ceahlău is the seat of local government for the wider eponymous township, with about 1,500 villagers, mostly along the Pârâul Schit ("Hermitage Stream") (named for the original hermitage in Durău upstream) which runs through the village centre. The settlement here was originally named satul Schit ("Hermitage Village").

=== Bistricioara ===
The nearby village of Bistricioara is on the main road, the national highway DN15 where it intersects with the DN155F, which runs along the lake, up through Ceahlău, and then up to the Durău resort. With about 800 inhabitants, Bistricioara is spread across the alluvial soils of the lower river of the same name, just before it flows into Lake Izvorul Muntelui (also known as Lake Bicaz).

=== Pârâul Mare ===
A newer development along the shores of the lake (which was man-made by damming the river in the 1950s to power a hydroelectric plant), 140 people enjoy excellent lake views, also along the Pârâul Mare river.

Historical population
Year	Pop.	±%
2002	2,506	—
2011	2,180	−13.0%
2021	2,035	−6.7%
Source: Census data

== Natives ==
- Remus Pricopie (born 1970), education administrator
