= Cârlibaba =

Cârlibaba German: Mariensee or Kirlibaba Polish: Kirlibaba
- Commune
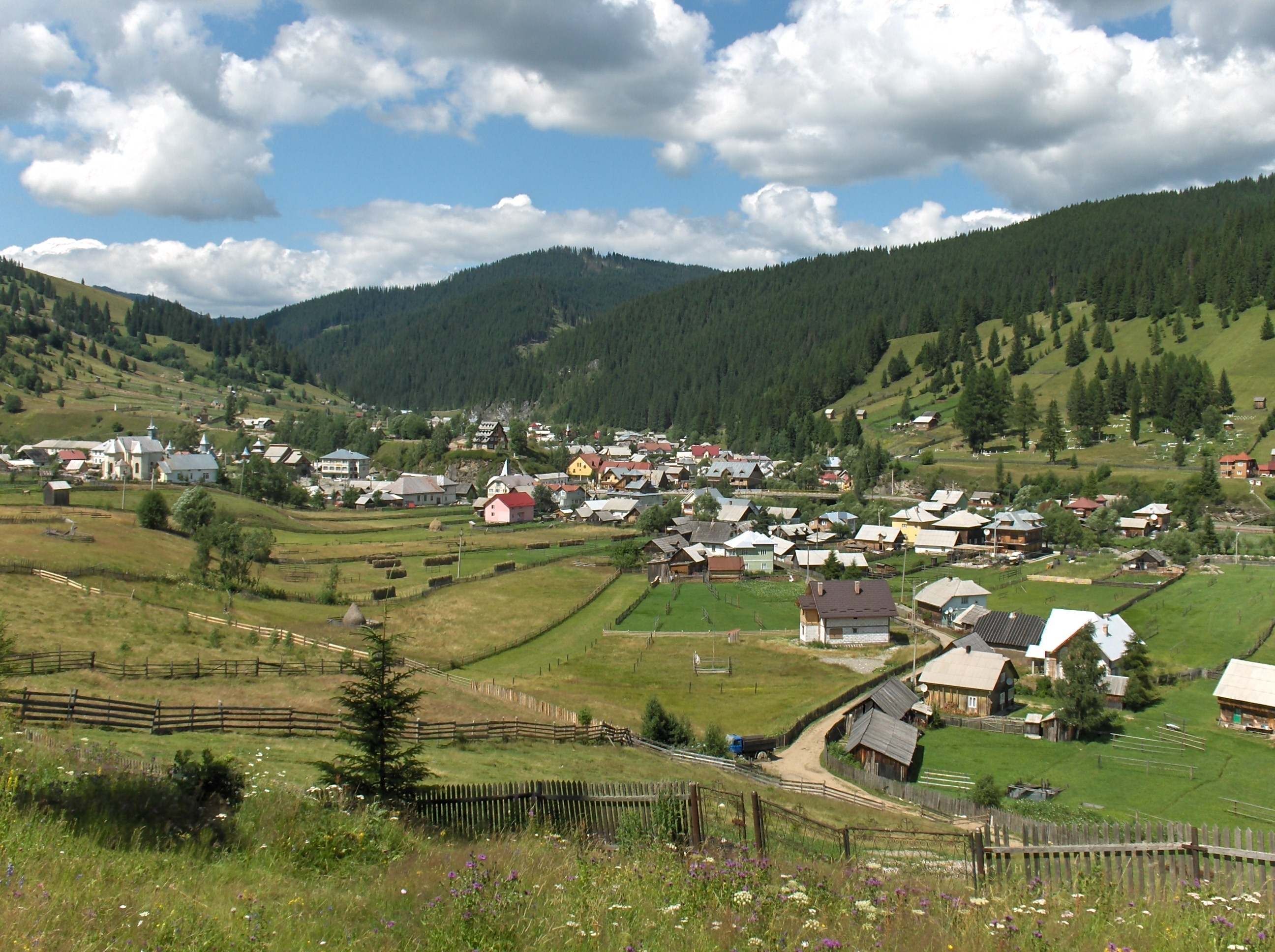
- Cârlibaba in July 2009

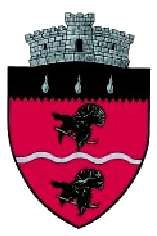
- Coat of arms

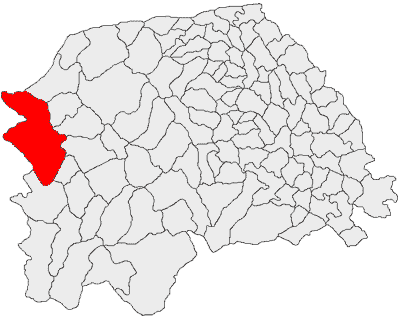
- Location in Suceava County

- Location in Romania
- Coordinates: 47°35′N 25°8′E
- Country: Romania
- County: Suceava
- Subdivisions: Cârlibaba, Cârlibaba Nouă, Iedu, Șesuri, Țibău, Valea Stânei

Government
  - Mayor (2024–2028): Gabriel-Michael Danciu (PNL)
- Area: 272 km^{2} (105 sq mi)
- Elevation: 946 m (3,104 ft)
- Population (2021-12-01): 1,588
  - Density: 5.84/km^{2} (15.1/sq mi)
- Time zone: UTC+02:00 (EET)
  - Summer (DST): UTC+03:00 (EEST)
- Postal code: 727110
- Area code: +40 x30
- Vehicle reg.: SV
- Website: www.primariacirlibaba.ro

Cârlibaba (German: Mariensee or Kirlibaba; Polish: Kirlibaba) is a commune located in Suceava County, Bukovina, northeastern Romania. It is composed of six villages, namely: Cârlibaba (Veche; also the commune seat), Cârlibaba Nouă (German: Ludwigsdorf), Iedu (German: Jedt), Șesuri (German: Schessu), Țibău (German: Zibau), and Valea Stânei (German: Hüttenthal bei Mariensee).

== Other names ==
In standard German (i.e. Hochdeutsch), Cârlibaba Veche is known as Mariensee whereas Cârlibaba Nouă is known as Ludwigsdorf.

== Demographics ==
At the 2002 census, 85.3% of inhabitants were Romanians, 9% Germans (more specifically Bukovina Germans and Zipser Germans), and 5.4% Ukrainians. 85.8% were Romanian Orthodox and 13.1% Roman Catholic.

At the 2011 census, 89.05% of inhabitants were Romanians, 5.07% Germans (more specifically Bukovina Germans and Zipser Germans) and 4.08 Ukrainians. For the rest of 1.81% inhabitants, their ethnicity was registered as unknown. 84.8% were Romanian Orthodox and 12.17% Roman Catholic. For the rest of 1.81% inhabitants, their religious confession was registered as unknown.

== History ==
Historical affiliations

Moldavia (1388–1775)
Habsburg Monarchy (1775–1804)
Austrian Empire (1804–1867)
Austria-Hungary, Cisleithania (1867–1918)
Kingdom of Romania (1918–1947)
Romanian People's Republic (1947–1965)
Socialist Republic of Romania (1965–1989)
Romania (1989–present)

Along with the rest of Bukovina, Cârlibaba formed part of the Principality of Moldavia until 1774, when it was occupied by Russia, and soon handed over to Austria. Under Austria and Austria-Hungary, the commune was inhabited by a sizeable number of Zipser German mining colonists (part of the broader Bukovina German community of the historical region of Bukovina and Suceava County).

During World War I, on 18–23 January 1915, it was the site of a battle between the Polish Legions and Russian troops, won by the Poles. A memorial to the fallen Polish soldiers was erected in 1932 near the Saint Louis church.

== Administration and local politics ==
=== Communal council ===
The commune's current local council has the following political composition, according to the results of the 2020 Romanian local elections:

Party	Seats	Current Council
National Liberal Party (PNL)	5	
Social Democratic Party (PSD)	4	
People's Movement Party (PMP)	1	
PRO Romania (PRO)	1	

== Gallery ==
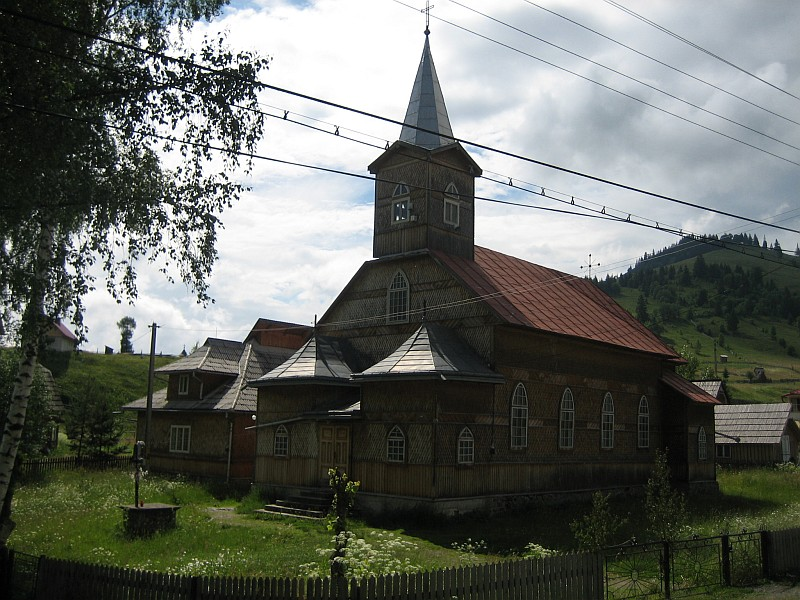
Evangelical Lutheran church

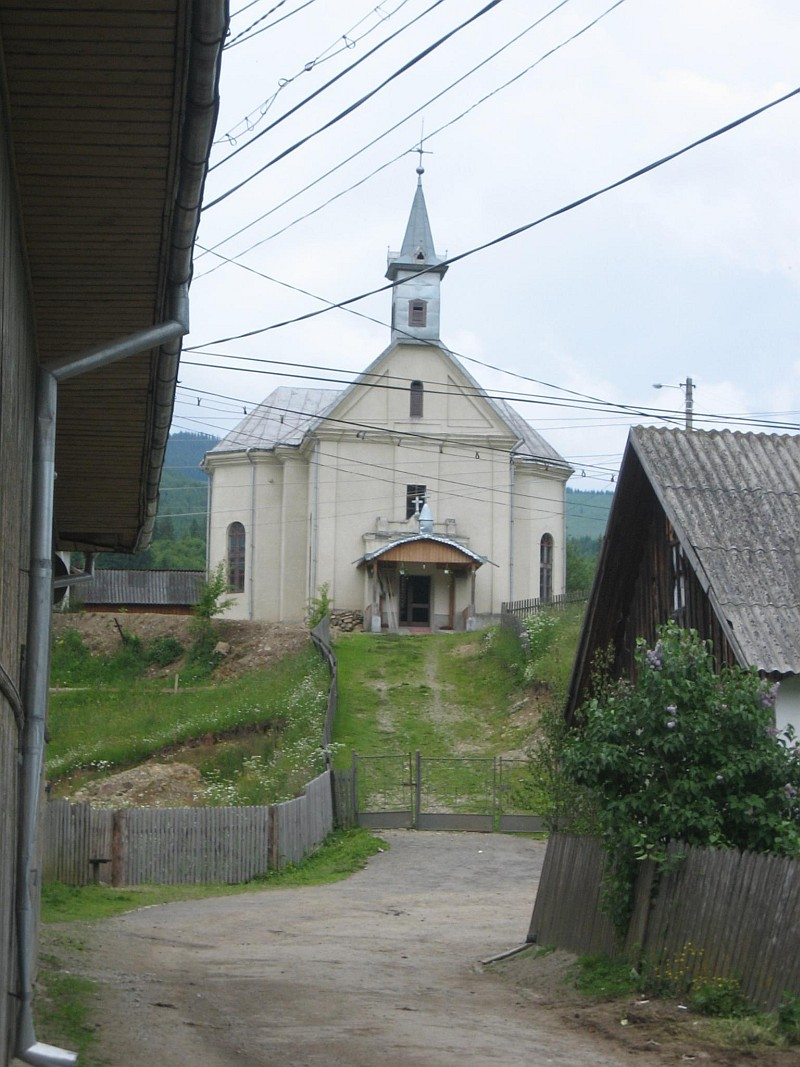
Roman Catholic church

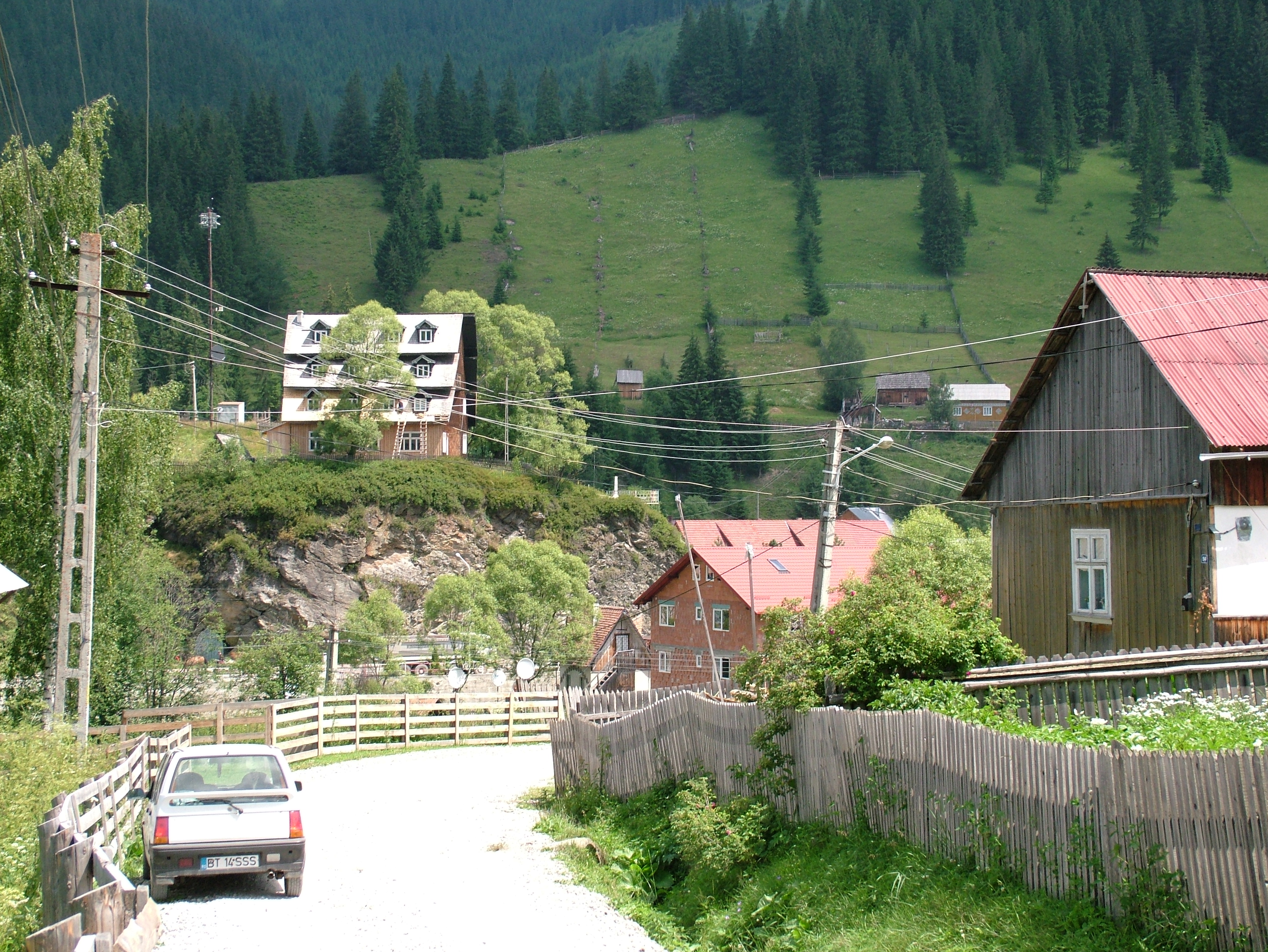
The house on the rock (Romanian: Casa de pe stâncă)

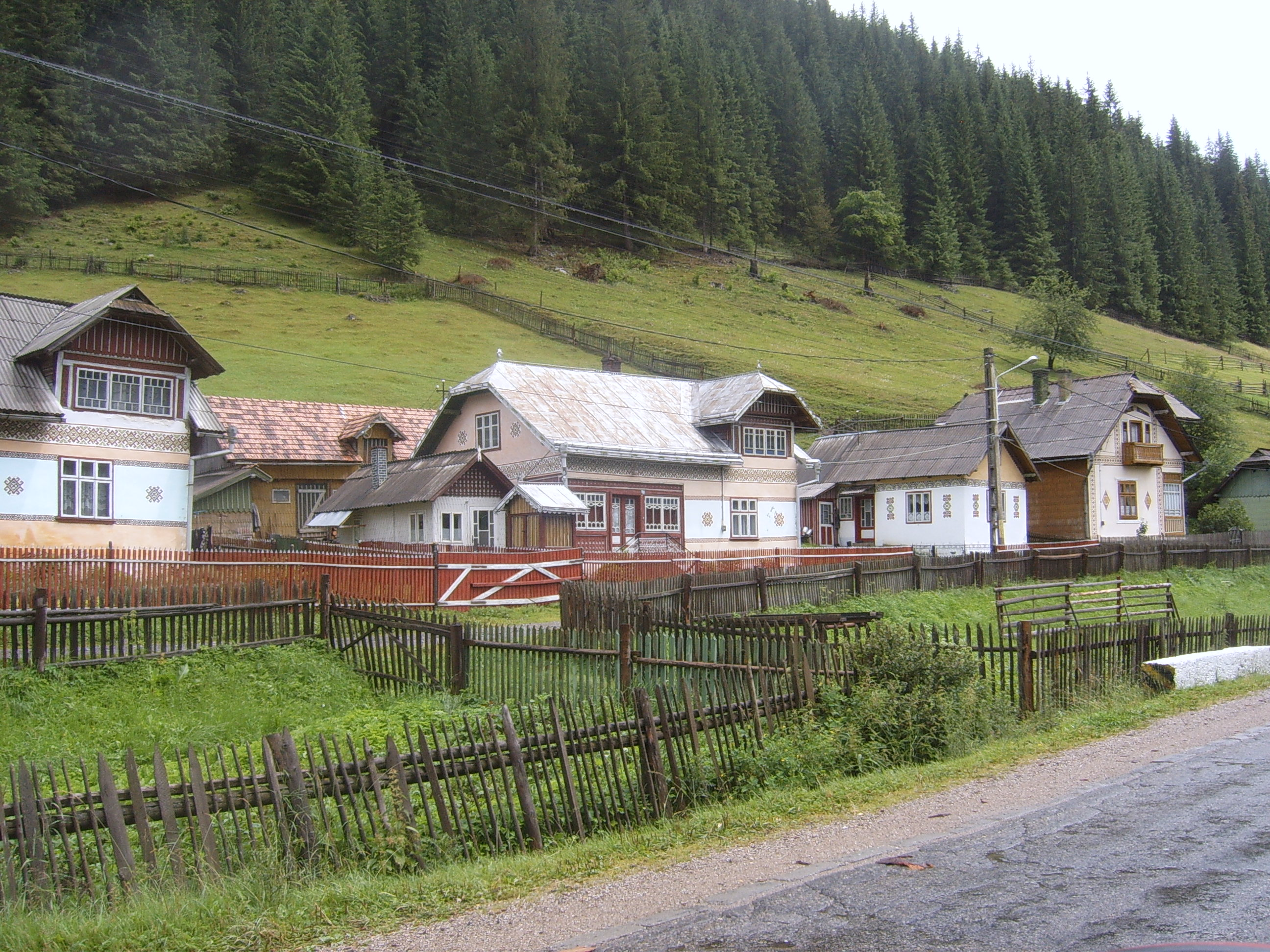
Traditional Romanian houses

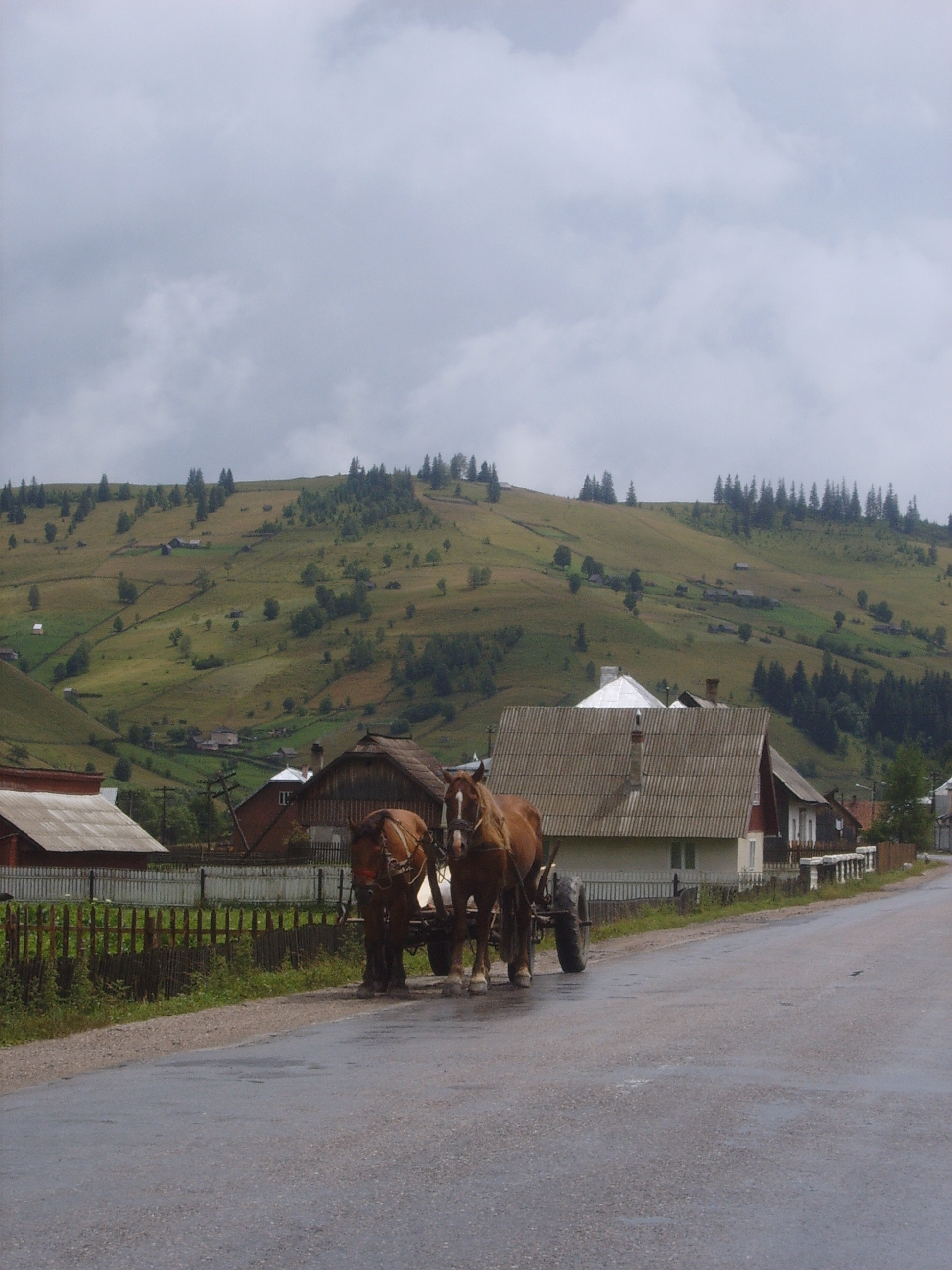
Local horse-drawn cart

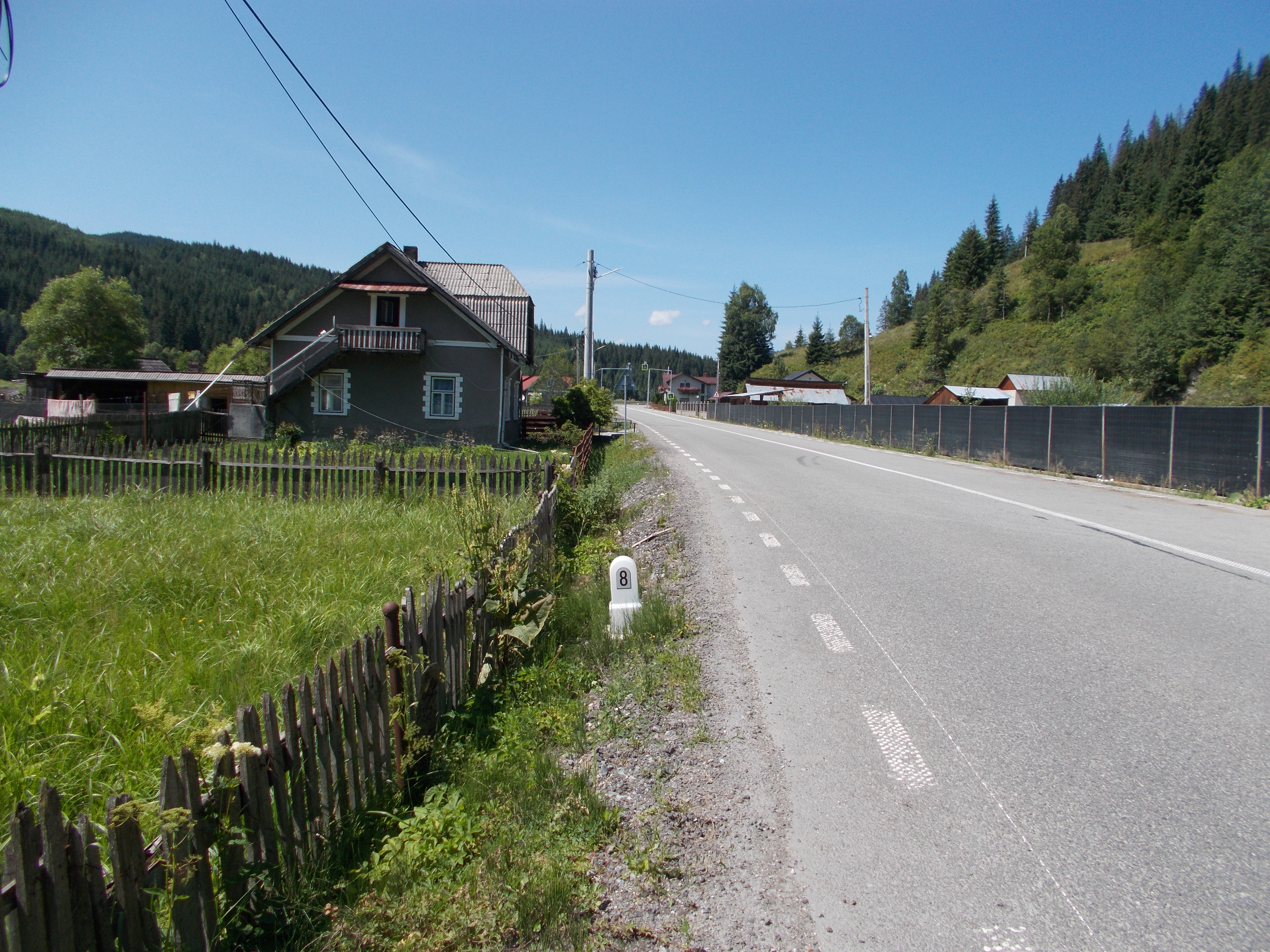
Valea Stânei constituent village in August 2021

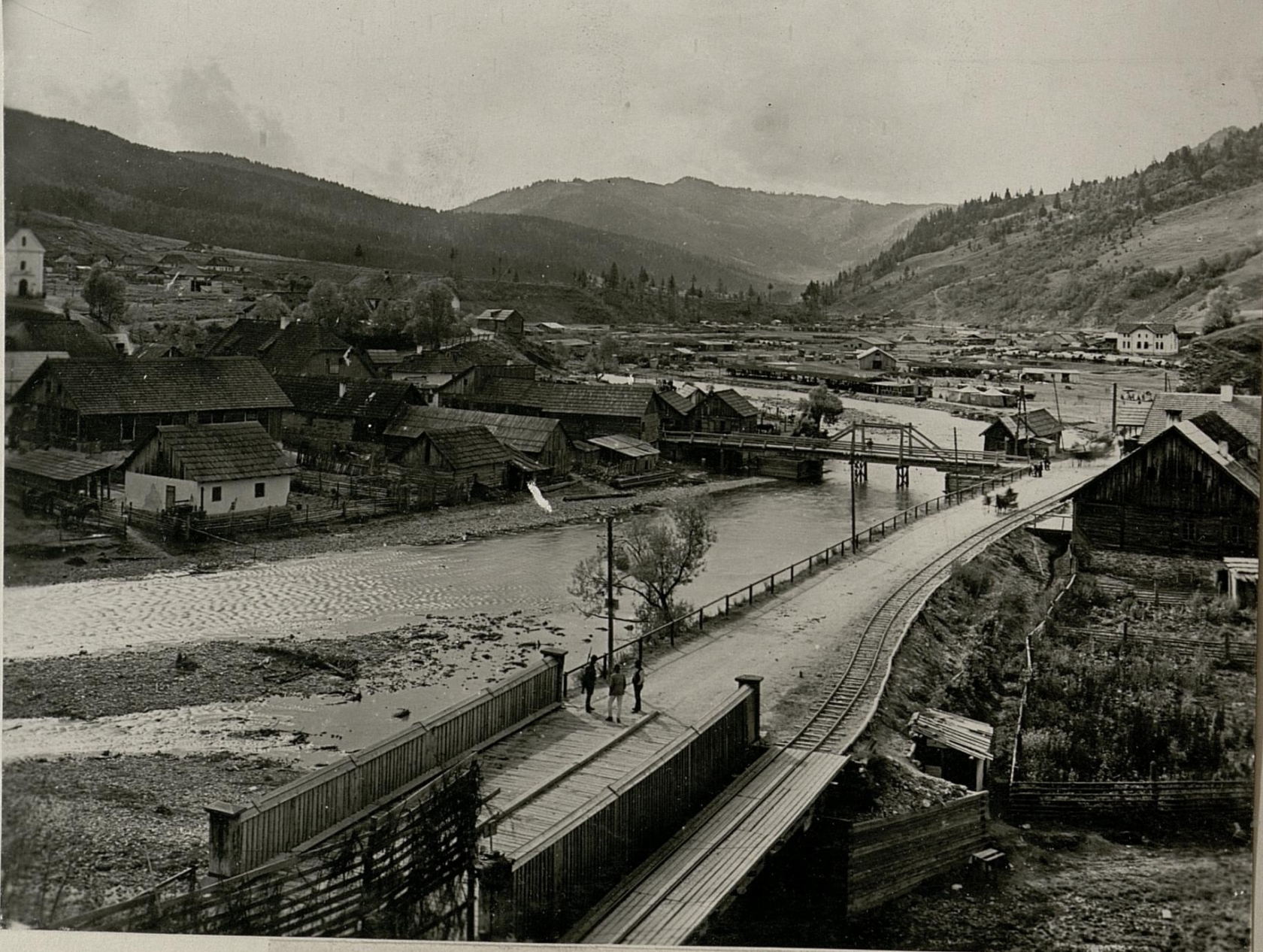
Cârlibaba during World War I

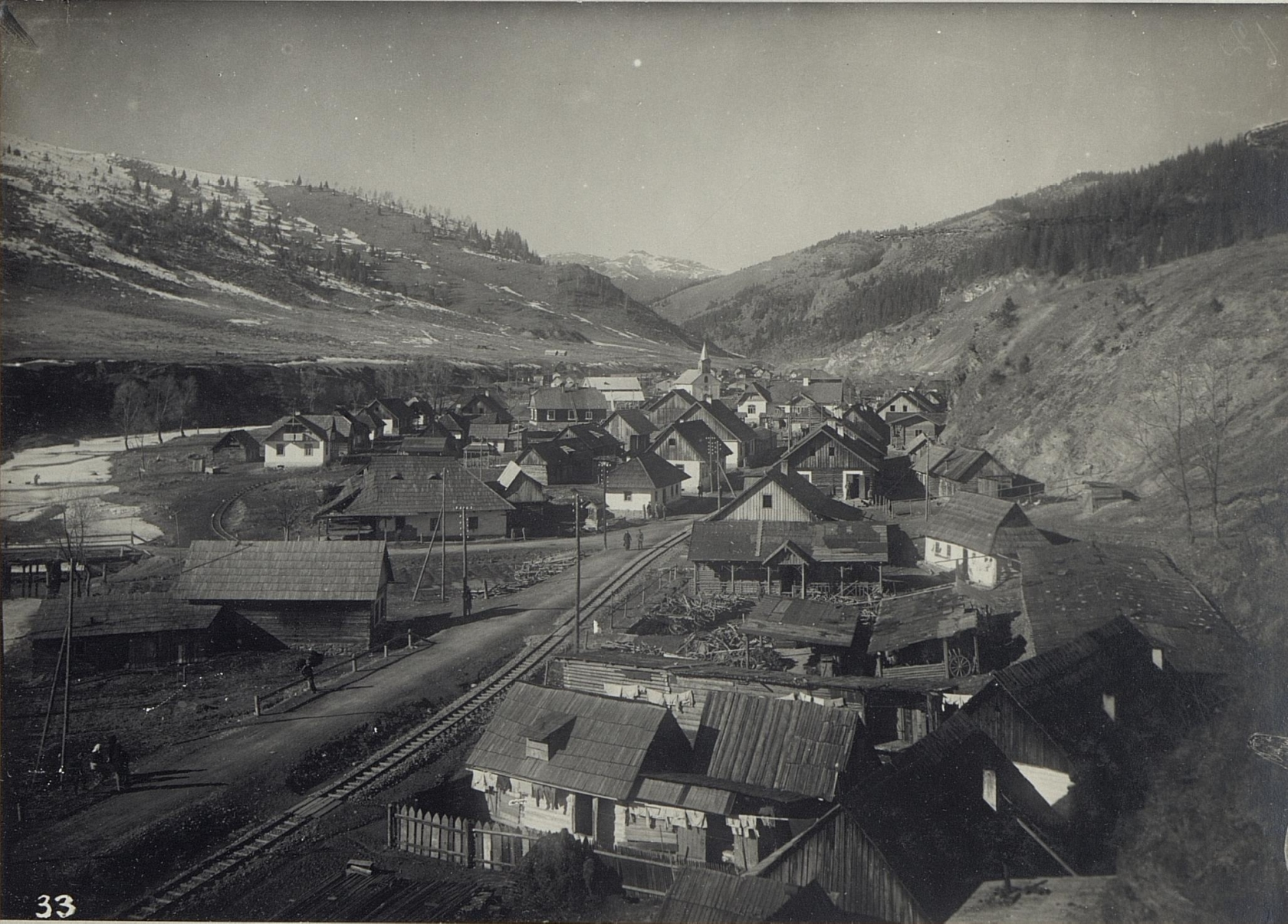
Cârlibaba in 1917

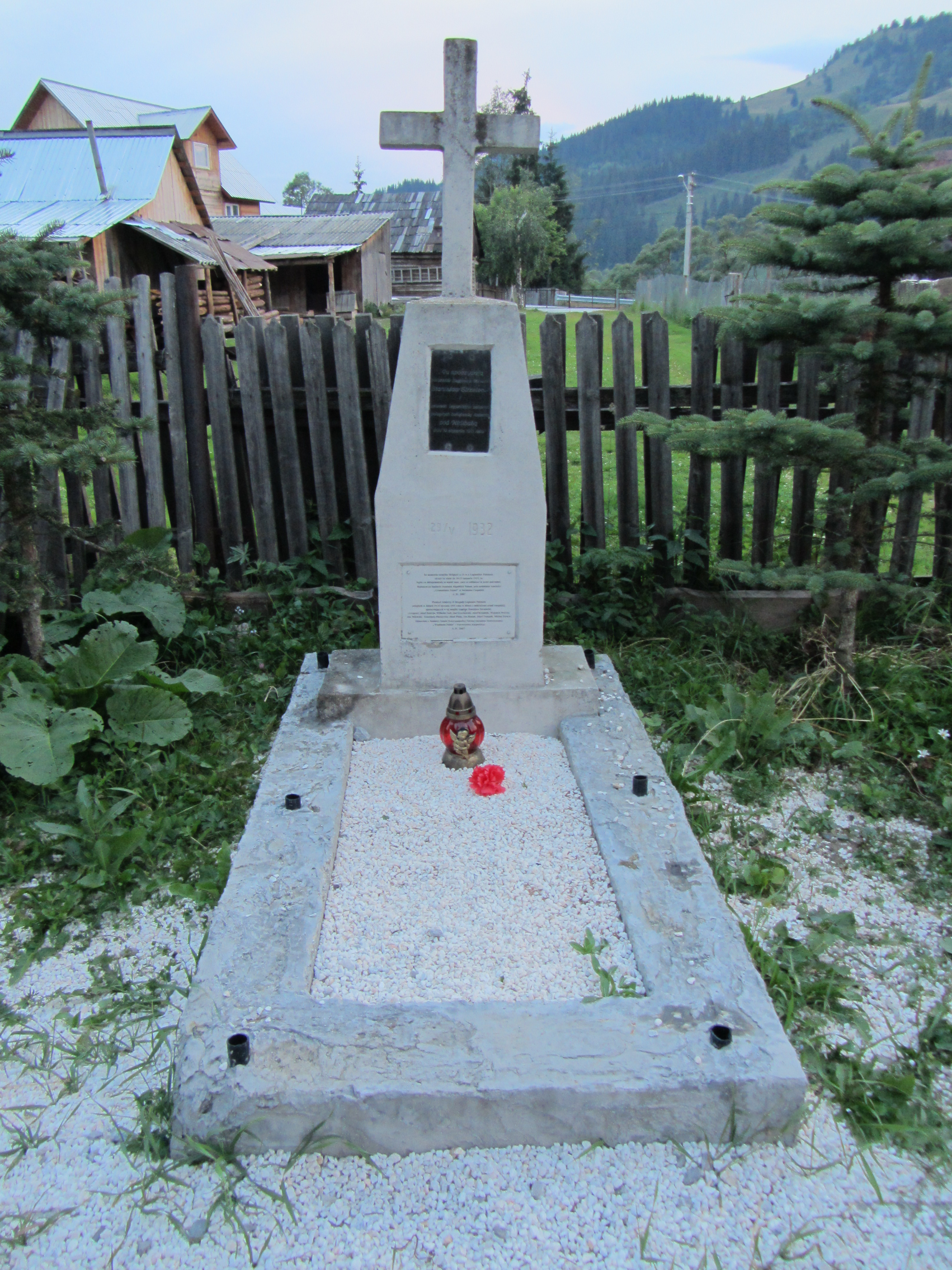
Grave of Polish soldiers fallen in the Battle of Cârlibaba
