= Crucea, Suceava =

Crucea
- Commune
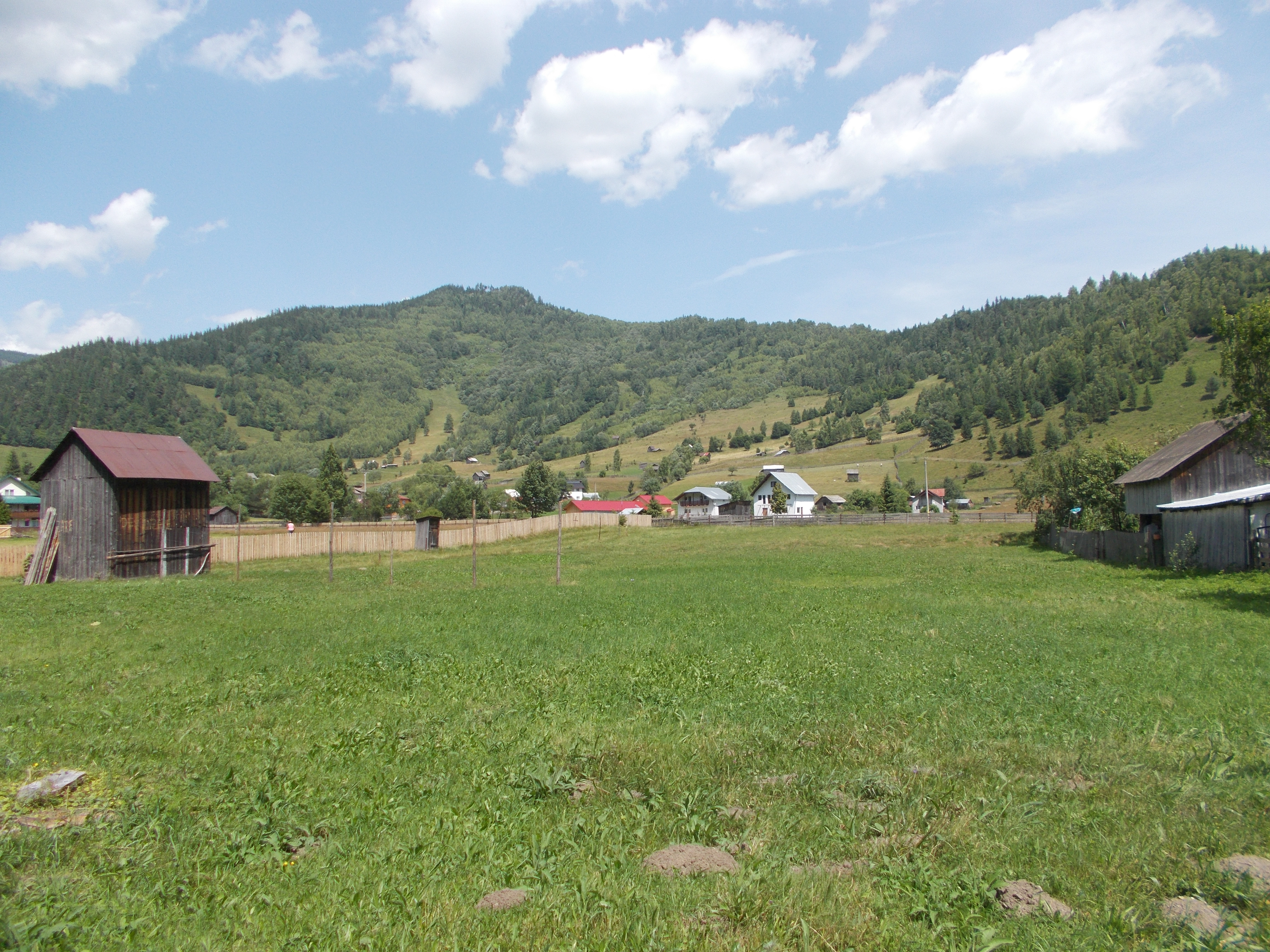
- Crucea commune in Suceava County, Bukovina, northeastern Romania in 2021

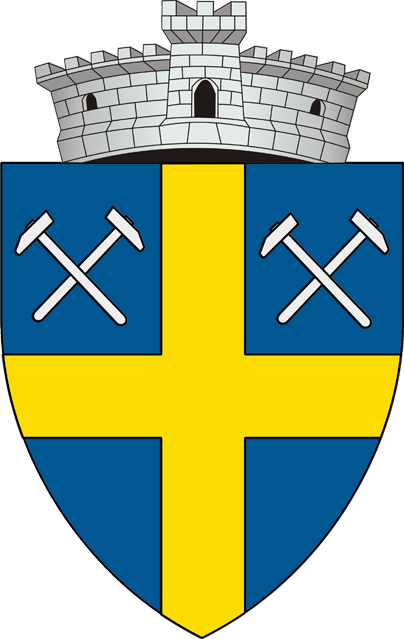
- Coat of arms

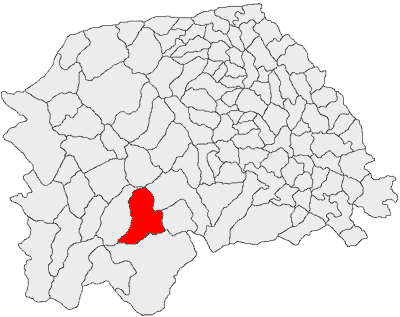
- Location in Suceava County

- Location in Romania
- Coordinates: 47°21′N 25°38′E
- Country: Romania
- County: Suceava
- Subdivisions: Crucea, Chiril, Cojoci, Satu Mare

Government
  - Mayor (2024–2028): Dorin Rusu (PSD)
- Area: 151 km^{2} (58 sq mi)
- Elevation: 693 m (2,274 ft)
- Population (2021-12-01): 1,583
  - Density: 10.5/km^{2} (27.2/sq mi)
- Time zone: UTC+02:00 (EET)
  - Summer (DST): UTC+03:00 (EEST)
- Postal code: 727150
- Area code: (+40) x30
- Vehicle reg.: SV
- Website: www.primariacruceasv.ro

Crucea is a commune located in Suceava County, in the historical region of Bukovina, northeastern Romania. It is composed of four villages, namely: Chiril, Cojoci, Crucea, and Satu Mare.
