= Cândești, Neamț =

Cândești
- Commune
- Location in Neamț County

- Location in Romania
- Coordinates: 46.724°N 26.582°E
- Country: Romania
- County: Neamț

Government
  - Mayor (2024–2028): Vasile Bogdan Gherasim (PNL)
- Area: 37.74 km^{2} (14.57 sq mi)
- Elevation: 250 m (820 ft)
- Population (2021-12-01): 3,192
  - Density: 84.58/km^{2} (219.1/sq mi)
- Time zone: UTC+02:00 (EET)
  - Summer (DST): UTC+03:00 (EEST)
- Postal code: 617115
- Area code: +(40) 233
- Vehicle reg.: NT
- Website: candesti.ro

Cândești is a commune in Neamț County, Western Moldavia, Romania. It is composed of six villages: Bărcănești, Cândești, Dragova, Pădureni, Țârdenii Mici, and Vădurele.

Historical population
Year	Pop.	±%
1992	4,189	—
2002	4,182	−0.2%
2011	3,232	−22.7%
2021	3,192	−1.2%
Source: Census data
