= Lake Izvorul Muntelui =

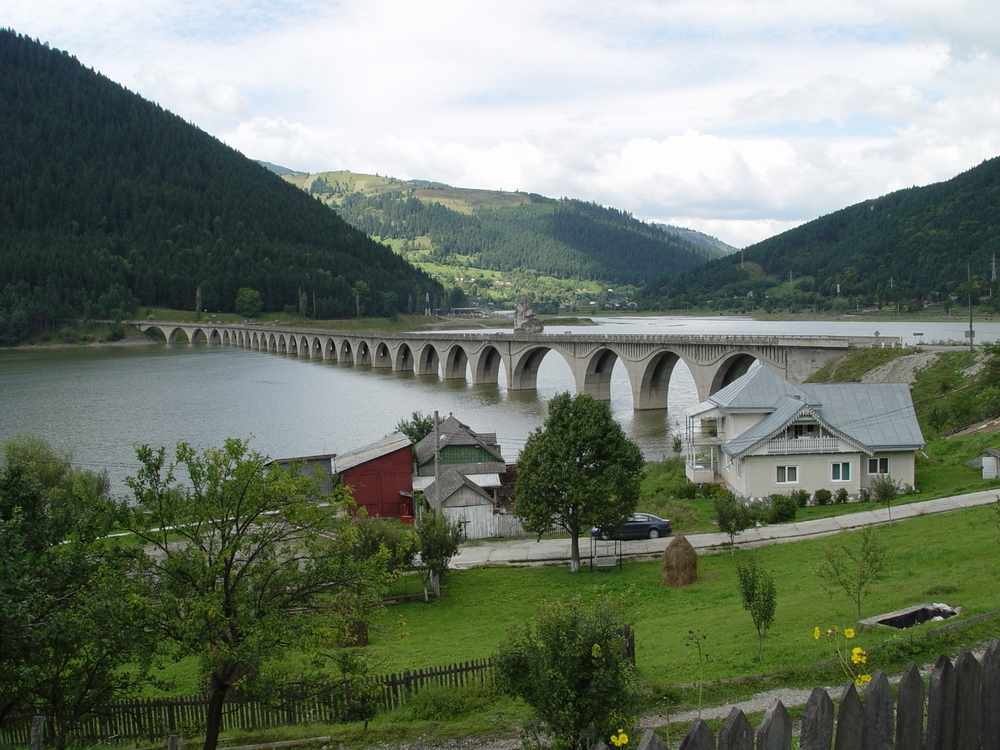

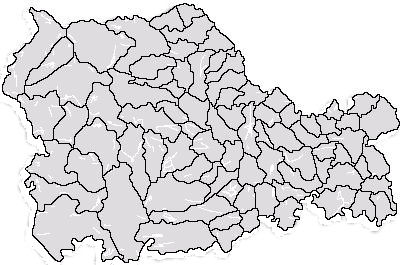
- Location within Neamţ County
- Location: Romania
- Coordinates: 47.01959°N 26.05408°E
- Type: artificial lake
- Primary inflows: Bistrița River
- Primary outflows: Bistrița River
- Basin countries: Romania
- Max. length: 40 km (25 mi)
- Max. width: 2 km (1.2 mi)
- Surface area: 31 km^{2} (12 sq mi)
- Max. depth: 97 m (318 ft)
- Water volume: 1,250 billion cubic metres (1.01×10^{9} acre⋅ft) (max)
- Settlements: Bicaz port, Potoci

The Lake Izvorul Muntelui, also known as Lake Bicaz, is the largest artificial lake on the interior waters of Romania; it was created after the completion of a dam built on the river Bistrița. The dam is located a few kilometers north of the town of Bicaz.

The dam was built between 1950 and 1960, and is used to generate hydroelectricity at the Bicaz-Stejaru Hydroelectric Power Station. It has a height of 127 m (417 ft), a length of 435 m (1,427 ft), and a maximum width of 119 m (390 ft).

It is a gravity dam made of concrete, and connects Mount Gicovanu with Obcina Horștei, located upstream of the confluence of the stream Izvorul Muntelui with Bistrița. Geologically, it is located in an area with predominantly siliceous sandstones (Tarcău sandstone), the rest being packages of argillaceous shales and a layer of conglomerates. The foundation soil shows a strong cracking.

Its structure consists of 30 high blocks (plots), separated by joints sealed upstream with reinforced concrete wedges and copper sheeting. It is crossed by galleries, ventilation shafts, and manholes. The construction has provided rooms that house drive and control installations, equipment for seismic monitoring and tracking the behavior of each element. At the top, there are four 11.5 m wide spillway fields for a 7 m high water blade (equipped with 6 m segment staves), and four bottom clearings equipped with flat valves (2.50 m diameter) in glasses, arranged in series.

The lake has a length of 40 km (25 mi), an area of 31 km^{2} (12 sq mi) and a maximum volume of 1,250 billion m³.

It stretches from north-west to south-east, with frequent lateral expansion areas, the most important of which is the one on the Bistricioara river (about 3 km).

Two secondary reservoirs, at Tașca and Izvoru Muntelui, divert water from the Bicaz and Izvorul Muntelui rivers into the main lake. The Tașca reservoir is located behind a weir type dam, with two spill fields equipped with 2 segment staves. The water inlet is continued by a bypass gallery, providing the servitude discharge. The second intake is installed where the Izvorul Muntelui stream crosses the diversion gallery, with the stream flowing directly into the gallery. The water accumulated at Tașca is used both for electricity production in the "Bicaz-Stejaru" hydroelectric power plant and for supplying the cement factory in the locality or for other downstream needs.

The hydroelectric power plant is located 15 km downstream from the dam, in the village of Stejaru, in the commune of Pângărați. It is a high head type of power plant, with reservoir and pressurized diversion (adduction gallery), balancing tower, penstocks, distributors, power plant, powerhouse, stilling basin and tailrace.

Over the years, the power plant has benefited from various repair activities, sub-assembly replacements, automation equipment optimizations and equipment upgrades.

The lake is a tourist destination in the region, especially in summertime, when visitors take the ferryboat from the Bicaz port for a short trip on the lake, and to view Mount Ceahlău on the west shore.

In the 1960s and 1970s, there was regular ferry service between the Bicaz port and the villages on the lake shore.

At Potoci, a few kilometers north of the town of Bicaz, there is a biological research facility, equipped with a small submersible used for underwater exploration. The facility was visited by the marine biologist Jacques-Yves Cousteau in 1984.

Bicaz Lake

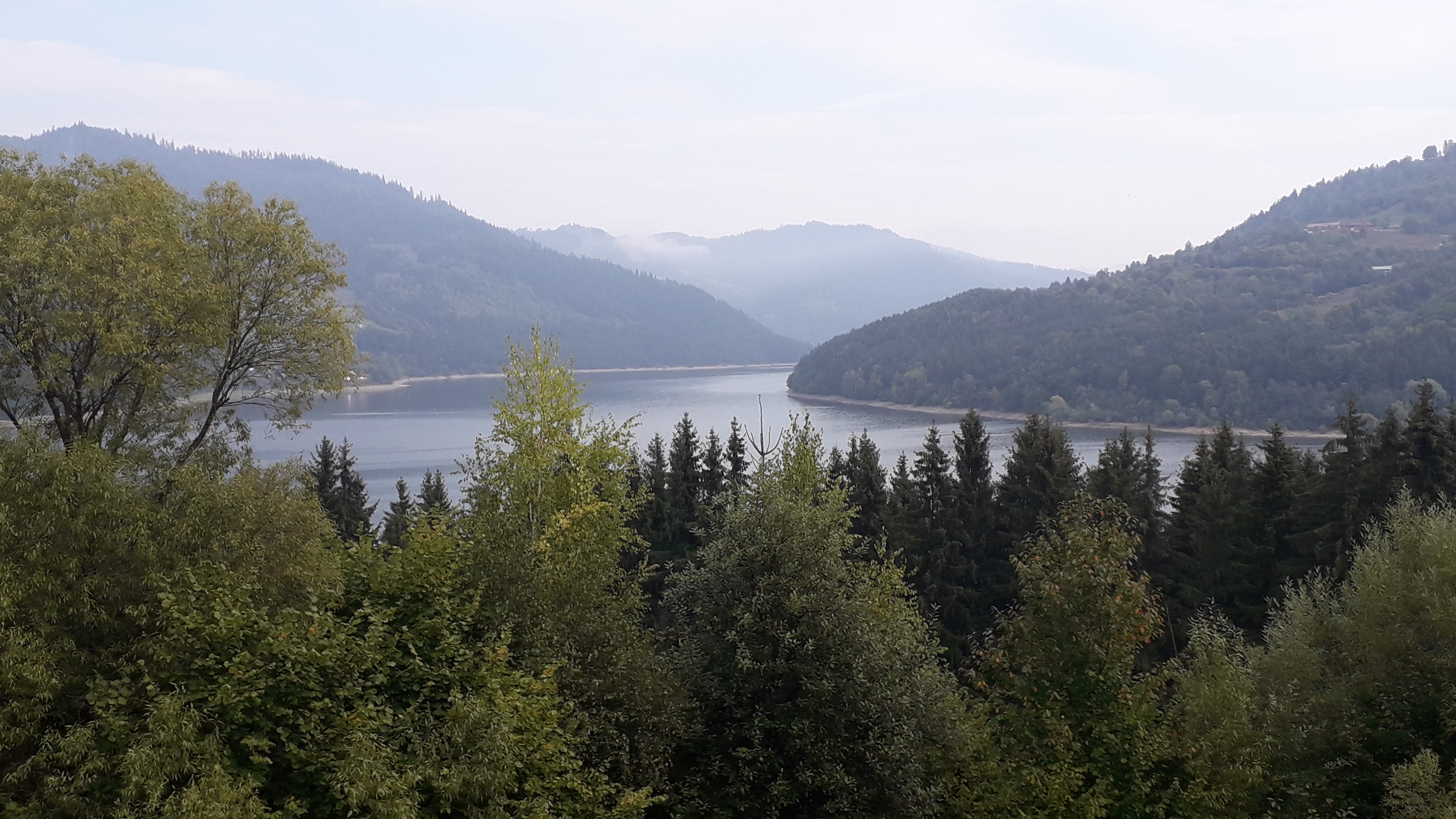
Bicaz Lake and Bistricioara
