= Bicazu Ardelean =

- Commune
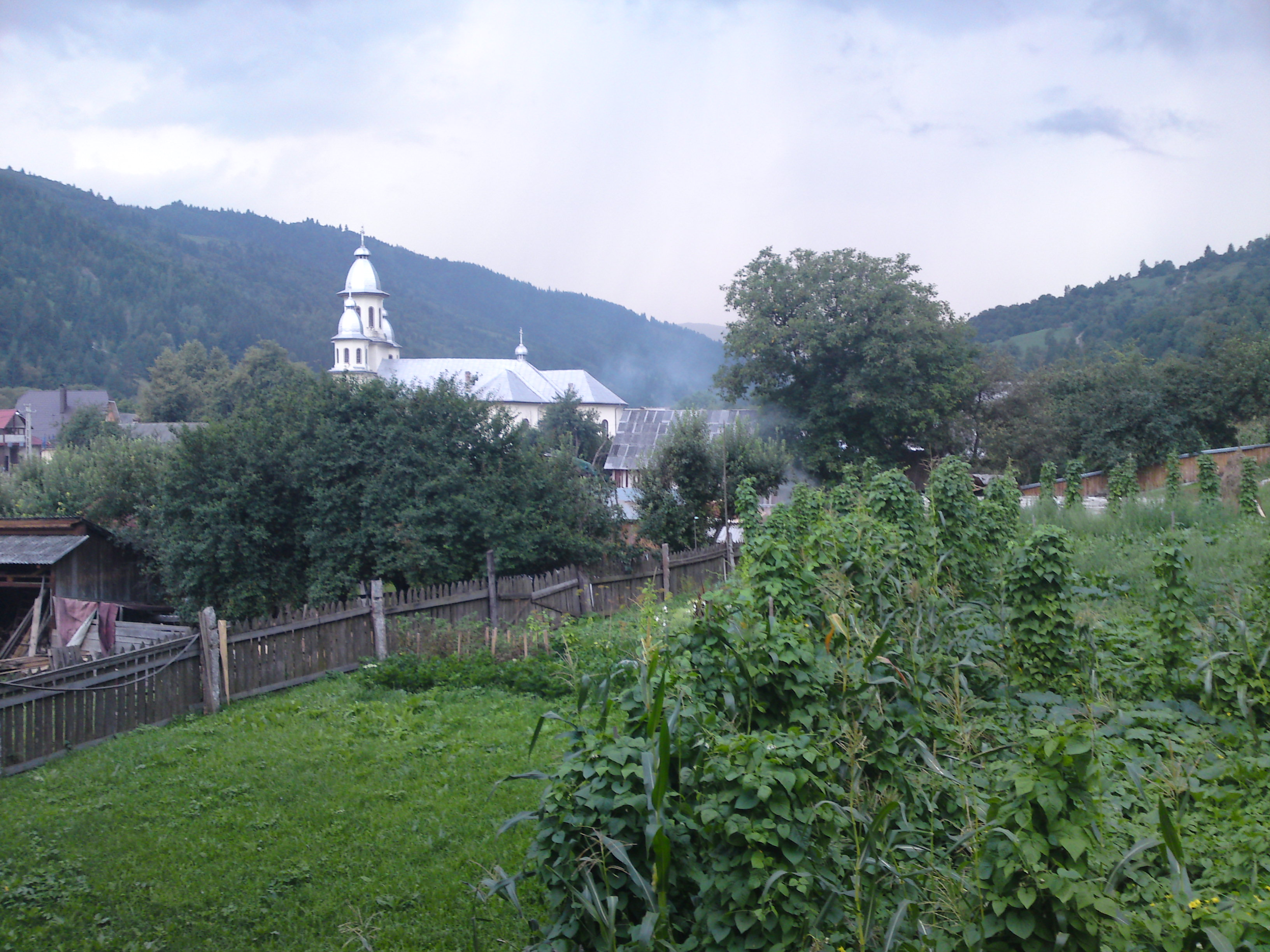
- View of Bicazu Ardelean

- Location in Neamț County

- Location in Romania
- Coordinates: 46°51′N 25°56′E
- Country: Romania
- County: Neamț

Government
  - Mayor (2024–2028): Constantin-Ioan Bîrsan (PNL)
- Area: 111.7 km^{2} (43.1 sq mi)
- Elevation: 600 m (2,000 ft)
- Highest elevation: 688 m (2,257 ft)
- Lowest elevation: 553 m (1,814 ft)
- Population (2021-12-01): 3,236
  - Density: 28.97/km^{2} (75.03/sq mi)
- Time zone: UTC+02:00 (EET)
  - Summer (DST): UTC+03:00 (EEST)
- Postal code: 617065
- Area code: +(40) 233
- Vehicle reg.: NT
- Website: comunabicazuardelean.ro

Bicazu Ardelean (Hungarian: Gyergyóbékás) is a commune in Neamț County, Romania. It is composed of three villages: Bicazu Ardelean, Telec (Gyergyózsedánpatak), and Ticoș (Tikos).

Located on the western border of Neamț County, Bicazu Ardelean is one of three communes in the county (most of which is in Western Moldavia) that are part of the historic region of Transylvania.

The commune lies on the banks of the Bicaz River and its tributaries, the Capra and the Bistra. Directly to the north is the imposing Ceahlău Massif, while the Hășmaș Mountains are to the southwest. It neighbors the following communes: Grințieș and Ceahlău to the north, Tașca to the east, Bicaz-Chei to the south, and Tulgheș, Harghita County to the west.

Bicazu Ardelean is traversed by national road DN12C, which starts in Bicaz, 15 km (9.3 mi) to the east; the road continues through the scenic Bicaz Gorge, passes by the Red Lake, and ends in Gheorgheni, 43 km (27 mi) to the west, in Harghita County.

In the hamlet of Țepeșeni there is marl quarry; the ore extracted from there is transported to the cement factory in Tașca along the railway line that runs from Bicaz-Chei to Bicaz.

The Wooden church from Bicazu Ardelean (located on Pârâul Caprei Street in Telec village) is listed as a historic monument by the National Register of Historic Monuments.

Historical population
Year	Pop.	±%
1850	2,368	—
1880	3,304	+39.5%
1900	6,368	+92.7%
1910	7,133	+12.0%
1930	4,605	−35.4%
1941	9,617	+108.8%
1956	4,307	−55.2%
1977	4,620	+7.3%
1992	4,154	−10.1%
2002	4,229	+1.8%
2011	4,030	−4.7%
2021	3,236	−19.7%
Source: Census data

== Notable people ==
- Mozes Kahana (1897–1974) – writer and revolutionary
