= Asău (disambiguation) =

Asău may refer to the following places in Romania:

- Asău, a commune in Bacău County
- Asău, a tributary of the Dămuc in Neamț County
- Asău (Trotuș), a tributary of the Trotuș in Bacău County
