= Bicăjel =

- Location within Romania

Location
- Country: Romania
- Counties: Neamț County
- Villages: Trei Fântâni

Physical characteristics
- Source: Hășmaș Mountains
- Mouth: Bicaz
  - location: Bicaz Gorge
  - coordinates: 46.8105°N 25.8261°E
- Length: 26 km (16 mi)
- Basin size: 83 km^{2} (32 sq mi)

Basin features
- Progression: Bicaz→ Bistrița→ Siret→ Danube→ Black Sea
- Tributaries
  - left: Lazăru
  - right: Tarvez, Vete

The Bicăjel is a right tributary of the river Bicaz in Romania. It discharges into the Bicaz near Bicaz-Chei. Its length is 26 km (16 mi) and its basin size is 83 km^{2} (32 sq mi).
