= Comănești explosion =

Unidentified explosions in Romania

The Comănești explosion was an unexplained event that took place on 20 April 2006, in the Western Moldovan city of Comănești, Romania. The explosion took place around 9 AM, and was able to be heard across the territory of 4 Romanian counties: Bacău and neighboring Neamț, Harghita and Covasna, with the strongest area of noise being concentrated in the Valley of Trotuș.

== Description ==
The incident took place on 20 April 2006, estimated to be between 9:15 and 9:20 AM. The explosion was able to have been heard in the towns of Comănești, Onești, Moinești, Dărmănești, Ghimeș-Palanca, Asău, Agăș, Tescani and Lucăcești, being mostly concentrated in a radius of 15,5 km; it was possible to hear it in the cities in Bacău and Miercurea Ciuc too, to a lesser extent. The explosion reportedly caused no damage but locals reported the windows, buildings and the earth shaking, leaving people panicked in their homes and on the streets. Immediately after the blast, locals of the cities affected began to call the police to know what had happened.

Shortly after the blast took place, a IAR 330 helicopter from the 95th RoAF air base took off to survey industrial sites in the Bacău county and to check for any damages or a possible source of the event, at the request of local and national authorities, but after 105 minutes they could not find anything to explain the phenomenon.

In the aftermath of the event, detailed searches took place at some of the potential explosion sites: the coal mines at Comănești, the oil fields in Moinești, the Borzești Petrochemical Plant, a construction site on a bridge in Berzunți and several fields and forests to look for a crater or a crashed military aircraft or satellite. The commanders of the 95th RoAF air base were questioned in regards to their aircraft on the day of the incident, the National Institute of Earth Physics in order to determine if there was an earthquake on that day, and a number of eyewitnesses at the radio-television relay in Lapoș. A group of locals reported smoke on top of a hill in the area, but no evidence was found there.

== Theories ==
In the aftermath of the event, the areas that were researched found no conclusive evidence of a potential explosion, nor of a crater or damages from such an explosion. The leadership of the company who was exploiting the mines in Comănești showed that, despite there having been a planned mine explosion on the day of the incident, it was eventually called off, with the other mines having been closed or not having any similar planned events for the day.

A number of military staff, including general Nicolae Rugină, theorized that the event was caused by an aircraft who broke the sound barrier, by going from subsonic to supersonic speeds or vice versa. The theory was dismissed by Gelu Miron, the PR officer of the local air base, who stated that no aircraft of the 95th RoAF air base or of other air bases were spotted on radar on the day of the incident. He further added that the only civilian aircraft that could do this was the Concorde (who in his own words said that it was not flying over Romania, although in fact it was not flying at all, having been retired in 2003) and that the only aircraft of the air base that flew on that day was the helicopter sent to survey damages. This statement was confirmed by the commander of the air base, Virgil Ristea.

Another theory came from Dan Mitruț, then-vice president of the Romanian Astronomical Society, who claimed that the explosion came from a small meteorite. He said that a larger meteorite of a couple of tonnes would have left a crater, while a smaller one of a couple of hundred of kilograms would only leave traces in the trees. Similar to the Tunguska event in Russia, there is no evidence of a meteorite impact crater in the area. There was skepticism about this theory from other specialists, who believed that there must have been some traces left in the aftermath of the event.

Conspiracy theories quickly began to spread, some claiming that a USAF stealth bomber flew past and was not detected by the radar operators at Bacău. Others claim it was an UFO incident, or a secret military experiment. Others believe that it was due to the gasses from the coal mines or oil fields nearby that escaped into the air (or even infiltrated buildings), which was the case of an apartment building explosion on 30 August 1994, that killed several people.

The incident repeated again on 29 August 2008, when 3 similar explosions took place in the afternoon, just minutes apart. These explosions had a much larger radius (20 km), but just like the event in 2006, there was no visible damage or smoke from the blast, leaving many people confused once again. The investigation regarding the reported explosions was closed due to inconclusive evidence.

A similar incident took place on 16 May 2017 in the Brăila-Galați area, and was able to be heard 30 km away. Although previous phenomenons were attributed to the Smârdan testing range, they declared that they had no involvement to the event.

== See also ==
- Skyquake
- Tunguska event
