= Ardeluța River =

Ardeluța River may refer to:

- Ardeluța, a tributary of the Solca in Suceava County, Romania
- Ardeluța, a tributary of the Tarcău in Neamț County, Romania

== See also ==
- Ardeluța, a village in Tarcău Commune, Neamț County, Romania
