= Brateș (river) =

- Location within Romania

Location
- Country: Romania
- Counties: Neamț County

Physical characteristics
- Source: Tarcău Mountains, Mount Bolovan
  - coordinates: 46°42′28″N 26°03′50″E
  - elevation: 1,362 m (4,469 ft)
- Mouth: Tarcău
  - location: Brateș
  - coordinates: 46°47′48″N 26°08′59″E
  - elevation: 536 m (1,759 ft)
- Length: 18 km (11 mi)

Basin features
- Progression: Tarcău→ Bistrița→ Siret→ Danube→ Black Sea

The Brateș is a left tributary of the river Tarcău in Romania. It discharges into the Tarcău near the village Brateș. Its length is 18 km (11 mi).
