= Bistra (Bicaz) =

- Location within Romania

Location
- Country: Romania
- Counties: Neamț County

Physical characteristics
- Source: Ceahlău Massif
- Mouth: Capra
  - location: Telec
  - coordinates: 46.8714°N 25.8809°E
- Length: 13 km (8.1 mi)
- Basin size: 38 km^{2} (15 sq mi)

Basin features
- Progression: Capra→ Bicaz→ Bistrița→ Siret→ Danube→ Black Sea
- Tributaries
  - left: Bistra Mică, Frânturi
  - right: Largu, Frasin, Pârâul cu Strung

The Bistra (in its upper course also: Bistra Mare) is a left tributary of the river Capra in Romania. It flows into the Capra in Telec. Its length is 13 km (8.1 mi) and its basin size is 38 km^{2} (15 sq mi).
