= Borvizu River =

Borvizu River may refer to:

- Borviz, a tributary of the Capra in Neamț County, Romania
- Borviz, a tributary of the Cașin in Harghita County, Romania
