= Icoana (disambiguation) =

Icoana may refer to the following places in Romania:

- Icoana, a commune in Olt County
- Icoana, a village in the commune Ulmi, Giurgiu County
- Icoana, a tributary of the river Ața in Neamț County
- Icoana, a tributary of the river Nemțișor in Neamț County
