= Eugen Ghica-Comănești =

Romanian explorer and politician

- Born: December 31, 1840; Iași, Moldavia
- Died: December 20, 1914 (aged 73); Asău, Bacău County, Kingdom of Romania
- Spouse: Jeanne-Catherine Keșco
- Relatives: Niculae Ghica-Comăneștenul (father); Ecaterina Plagino (mother); Dimitrie Ghica-Comănești (twin brother)
- Military career
- Branch: Union Army
- Service years: 1861–1863
- Rank: Captain
- Unit: 5th New York Volunteer Infantry
- Other work: Member of the Senate of Romania

Eugen Ghica-Comănești (December 31, 1839 – December 20, 1914) was a Romanian explorer and politician.

== Biography ==
Eugen Ghica was born to Aga Niculae Ghica-Comăneștenul (1798–1853) and Ecaterina (née Plagino). The Ghica family has given the Danubian Principalities, starting with the 17th century, ten rulers. His father passed on an important fortune consisting of 81,707 hectares (201,900 acres) of land which were divided into ten estates. The five brothers (Dimitrie, Maria, Eugen, Nicolae, and Gheorghe) inherited two domains each.

Ghica married Jeanne-Catherine Keșco, thus becoming brother-in-law with Milan Obrenović, the King of Serbia, whose mother was from the Sturdza family. His participation in the American Civil War (1861–1865) was mentioned by the Romanian press, in the "Buciumul" newspaper. In 1866, Matei Sturza, the prefect of Botoșani County, referred to his participation in the American Civil War as "a man who, during the American war, showed his worth under the command of Lincoln, the new Washington!".

== Involvement in the American Civil War ==
In 1861, following an appeal from Abraham Lincoln, he enlisted as a volunteer in the 5th New York Volunteer Infantry. Wounded on the battlefield, Eugen was decorated and promoted to the rank of captain. On July 30, 1862, upon the death at the Battle of Cross Keys of Nicolae Dunca, a fellow Romanian volunteer in the Civil War, he sent a letter of condolence from a military hospital in New York, which was also published in "Buciumul" by Cezar Bolliac. On April 30, 1863, at Baton Rouge, Louisiana, he was a captain in the 5th Volunteer Regiment, and took part in the campaign of General Nathaniel Banks. In May, he briefly went to New Orleans, then to Key West in Florida. By June 6, 1863, he became the commander of the I Company, of the 10th Regiment of the Corps d'Afrique, consisting of black recruits, with camp set up in Port Hudson, Louisiana. For family reasons, on December 24, 1863, he submitted his resignation, which was accepted on December 31. He returned to Romania through Berlin. There, for two weeks, he visited the city, and then returned to Comănești. Here he was welcomed by his friends, who were impressed by the host's war stories.

== Political activity ==
Entering a political life, he was elected in 1869 as a member of the Senate for Bacău County. From 1879 until his death, Ghica was the permanent representative of Bacău County in Parliament, standing on firm anti-dynastic positions, especially in 1871 during the disorders caused by the Strussberg Affair and the Franco-Prussian War.
