= Asau =

Asau may refer to:

- Asău, Romanian commune
- Asau, Samoa, a village in Samoa
- Asau, Tuvalu, a village in Tuvalu

== See also ==
- Asău
