= Vancea =

Vancea may refer to:

- Ioan Vancea (1820–1892), Austro-Hungarian Greek-Catholic bishop
- Robert Vancea (born 1976), Romanian footballer
- Vancea River, river in Romania
- Vancea de Jos River, river in Romania
- Vancea de Sus River, river in Romania
