= Almásmező =

Almásmező is the Hungarian name for two communes in Romania:

- Poiana Mărului Commune, Braşov County
- Bicaz-Chei Commune, Neamţ County
