= Ața =

- Location within Romania

Location
- Country: Romania
- Counties: Neamț County

Physical characteristics
- Source: Mount Crăcăoaș
  - location: Tarcău Mountains
  - coordinates: 46°46′27″N 25°58′17″E
  - elevation: 1,174 m (3,852 ft)
- Mouth: Tarcău
  - location: Brateș
  - coordinates: 46°48′33″N 26°08′42″E
  - elevation: 518 m (1,699 ft)
- Length: 17 km (11 mi)

Basin features
- Progression: Tarcău→ Bistrița→ Siret→ Danube→ Black Sea
- Tributaries
  - left: Smida, Cujbela
  - right: Icoana, Toroglej

The Ața is a left tributary of the river Tarcău in Romania. It discharges into the Tarcău near Brateș. Its length is 17 km (11 mi).
