= Tărcuța =

- Location within Romania

Location
- Country: Romania
- Counties: Neamț County

Physical characteristics
- Source: Tarcău Mountains
  - coordinates: 46°41′20″N 26°04′38″E
  - elevation: 1,302 m (4,272 ft)
- Mouth: Tarcău
  - location: Upstream of Ardeluța
  - coordinates: 46°42′43″N 26°12′00″E
  - elevation: 759 m (2,490 ft)
- Length: 11 km (6.8 mi)
- Basin size: 40 km^{2} (15 sq mi)

Basin features
- Progression: Tarcău→ Bistrița→ Siret→ Danube→ Black Sea
- Tributaries
  - left: Cășăria
  - right: Hanu

The Tărcuța is a left tributary of the river Tarcău in Romania. It flows into the Tarcău near Ardeluța. Its length is 11 km (6.8 mi) and its basin size is 40 km^{2} (15 sq mi).
