= Râul Crucii =

Râul Crucii may refer to the following rivers in Romania:

- Râul Crucii (Brateș) - tributary of the Brateș
- Pârâul Crucii - tributary of the Latorița in Vâlcea County
