= Dămuc (river) =

- Location within Romania

Location
- Country: Romania
- Counties: Harghita, Neamț
- Villages: Puntea Lupului, Huisurez, Dămuc

Physical characteristics
- Source: Tarcău Mountains
- Mouth: Bicaz
  - location: Bicaz-Chei
  - coordinates: 46.8408°N 25.8957°E
- Length: 24 km (15 mi)
- Basin size: 150 km^{2} (58 sq mi)

Basin features
- Progression: Bicaz→ Bistrița→ Siret→ Danube→ Black Sea

The Dămuc (in its upper course also: Lupul, Hungarian: Damuk, Domuk) is a right tributary of the river Bicaz in Romania. It discharges into the Bicaz in Bicaz-Chei. Its length is 24 km (15 mi) and its basin size is 150 km^{2} (58 sq mi).

== Tributaries ==
The following rivers are tributaries to the river Dămuc:

- Left: Arșița, Picior, Pârâul Frunții, Pârâul Strungii, Pârâul Sătrișului
- Right: Pârâul Sec, Asău, Glodul, Bățul, Ivaneș
