= Jidanul River =

Jidanul River may refer to:

- Jidanul River (Bicaz)
- Jidanu, a tributary of the Jiul de Vest in Gorj County
