= Pârâul Tulbure =

Pârâul Tulbure may refer to:

- Pârâul Tulbure, a tributary of the Asău in Bacău County
- Pârâul Tulbure (Șoimu)
