= Chicera River =

Chicera River may refer to one of the following rivers in Romania:

- Chicera - tributary of the Asău River
- Chicera - tributary of the Râul Mare in Alba County

== See also ==
- Padina Chicera River
