= Ariniș River =

Ariniș River may refer to:

- Ariniș, a tributary of the Izvorul Alb in Bacău County
- Ariniș River (Tazlău)

== Others ==
- Arinișul Mare River

== See also ==
- Ariniș, a commune in Maramureș County, Romania
