= Danciu =

Danciu may refer to:

- Danciu River, a river of Romania

== People with the surname ==
- Ciprian Danciu (born 1977), Romanian footballer and manager
