= Izvorul Alb (Asău) =

- Location within Romania

Location
- Country: Romania
- Counties: Bacău County

Physical characteristics
- Source: Tarcău Mountains
- Mouth: Asău
  - location: Păltiniș
  - coordinates: 46.5471°N 26.3539°E
- Length: 10 km (6.2 mi)
- Basin size: 31 km^{2} (12 sq mi)

Basin features
- Progression: Asău→ Trotuș→ Siret→ Danube→ Black Sea
- Tributaries
  - left: Cracul Mic, Ariniș, Lespezi, Rața
  - right: Făget

The Izvorul Alb (also: Cracul Mare) is a left tributary of the river Asău in Romania. Its source is in the Tarcău Mountains. It discharges into the Asău in Păltiniș. Its length is 10 km (6.2 mi) and its basin size is 31 km^{2} (12 sq mi).
