= Bolovăniș (Tarcău) =

- Location within Romania Location within Europe

Location
- Country: Romania
- Counties: Neamț County

Physical characteristics
- Source: Tarcău Mountains
- Mouth: Tarcău
  - location: Schitu Tarcău
  - coordinates: 46°45′32″N 26°11′08″E
- Length: 12 km (7.5 mi)

Basin features
- Progression: Tarcău→ Bistrița→ Siret→ Danube→ Black Sea
- Tributaries
  - left: Lăzăroaie
  - right: Gonțu

The Bolovăniș (in its upper course also: Vancea) is a left tributary of the river Tarcău in Romania. It flows into Vancea Andrei Schitu Tarcău. Its length is 12 km (7.5 mi).
