= Durău =

Ski resort in northeastern Romania

Coordinates: 46°59′53″N 25°55′18″E

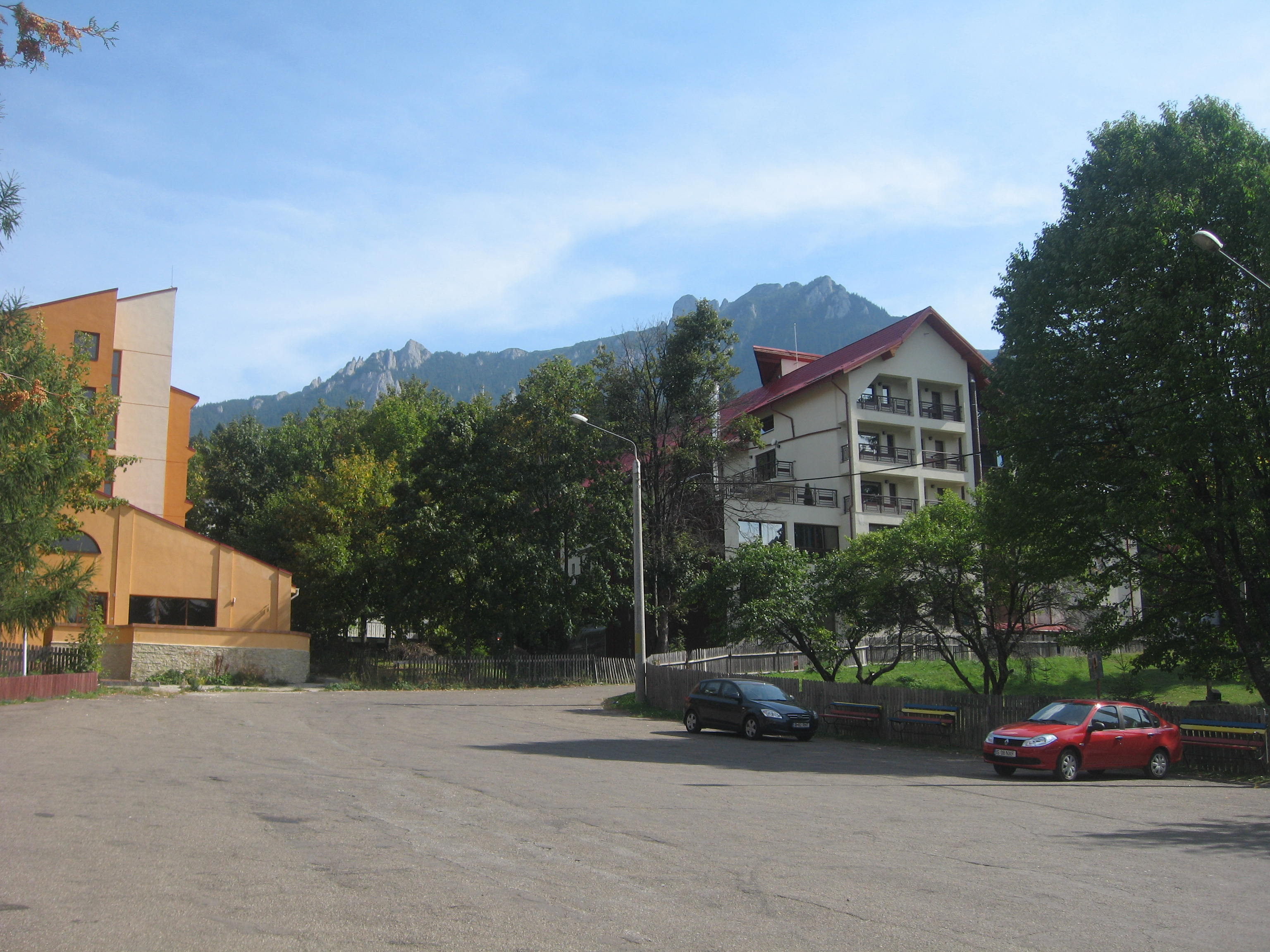
Hotels in Durău

Durău is a ski resort located in north-eastern Romania, in Neamț County, Moldavia near the Ceahlău Massif (to the mountains' north-west side). The location is disadvantaged because of the lack of accessibility, the only access road being DN15 (from Poiana Largului); the regular route from Bicaz is closed as of February 2006 due to landslides.

Durau Resort lies in Neamț county, at 780–800 m altitude, 9 km from Izvorul Muntelui Lake on the river Bistrița, in a sunny glade, on the north-west slope of the Ceahlau massif (Oriental Carpathians). The fauna of the surrounding woods is very rich: carpathian stag, brown bear, wild boar, black goat. From here hiking can be organised to the surrounding mountains (Ocolasu Mare Peak-1907 m and Toaca Peak-1904 m), Duruitoarea Waterfall, the Natural Reservation of bison from Ceahlau Mountains and many other trips: visits to nearby monasteries (Secu, Sihastrie, Neamt, Varatec and Agapia), monasteries from the north of Moldavia (Humorului, Sucevita, Moldovita, Putna, Dragomirna, Voronet), Bicaz Gorges, Rosu Lake, Borsec and Vatra Dornei resort. In Durau there is a small church painted by the famous Romanian painter Nicolae Tonitza and also a monastery built in 1992.

Durau is a year-round resort.

In town there are four 2 and 3-star hotels, an ancient monastery (Durău Monastery) and a conference center belonging to the Romanian Orthodox Church.

== See also ==
- Ceahlău Massif
