= Mozes Kahana =

Hungarian-born writer (1897–1974)

- Born: 26 November 1897; Gyergyóbékás, Hungary, Austria-Hungary (now Romania)
- Died: 11 April 1974 (aged 76); Budapest, Hungary
- Resting place: Kerepesi Cemetery, Budapest
- Occupations: Writer; poet; essayist; journalist; literary critic; revolutionary
- Writing career
- Language: Hungarian, Romanian, Russian, Esperanto
- Period: 1916–1974
- Genres: Proletarian literature, socialist realism
- Notable works: Hat nap és a hetedik ("Six days and seventh")

Chairman of the Union of Soviet Moldovan Writers
- In office 1 April 1927 – 1928
- Preceded by: None (Position established)
- Succeeded by: Dmitrii Milev

Military service
- Allegiance: Austria-Hungary; Soviet Hungary
- Branch/service: Hungarian Landwehr; Hungarian Red Army
- Battles/wars: World War I Hungarian–Romanian War
- Movements: Expressionism, then Proletkult

Mozes Kahana (Hungarian: Kahána Mózes; Russian: Моисей Генрихович Кахана; Romanian: Mozeș Cahana, 26 November 1897 – 11 April 1974) was a Hungarian-born writer, poet, essayist and revolutionary active in Romania, the Soviet Union and Hungary.

== Biography ==
=== Early life ===
Kahana was born in 1897 into a Jewish family in Gyergyóbékás, Kingdom of Hungary, Austria-Hungary (now Bicazu Ardelean, Neamț County, Romania). He was the younger brother of psychiatrist Ernő Kahána (1890–1982). In his hometown, Kahana published his first poems under the name Joel Béla.

=== Political and literary career ===
In 1918, with the formation of the First Hungarian Republic, he moved to Budapest, where he published under the pseudonym Gyergyai Zoltán. In the following year, when the Hungarian Soviet Republic was established, he became a member of the Communist Party of Hungary, with the help of Aladár Komját, and worked as a journalist for the newspaper "Vörös Újság" (Red Newspaper). He also served in a Red Regiment in Csepel. After the fall of the republic, he was arrested and imprisoned for six months. Subsequently, he was expelled to Austria, where he continued to write and publish. In 1921, he published a volume of dadaist and expressionist poems, Túl a politikán (with illustrations by Hans Mattis-Teutsch). While in Austria, he founded the magazine Egyseg („Unity”) in 1922, meant to unite leftist Hungarian emigres from Vienna.

In 1923, he returned to Transylvania, settling in the city of Târgu Mureș, which was already part of Romania. He joined the Romanian Communist Party (becoming a member of its Central Committee in 1924), which is why, in 1926, he was arrested and imprisoned at infamous Doftana prison. His arrest was condemned by the International Union of Revolutionary Writers. The same year, he escaped and moved to the Soviet Union, where he worked as a translator and lexicographer. He settled in the Moldavian Autonomous Soviet Socialist Republic and was one of the founders and the first leader of the Moldovan Writers' Union (USM). He was involved in the Proletkult movement and published poetry and essays in various Soviet journals. He also contributed to the development of the Esperanto language in the USSR.

In 1929, at the instructions of the Komintern, he was sent to Berlin, then to Paris, where he began to publish prose in Hungarian. Some of his works were published by the Hungarian publishing house in Cleveland, USA, under the pseudonym Köves Miklós. In Paris he also published journalistic and literary criticism works about other writers, such as Leo Tolstoy, Mihail Sadoveanu, Cezar Petrescu or Miklos Radnoti. He returned to the USSR in 1931 and was part of the Romanian communist exile. In 1937 he moved back to Romania and this time settled in Bessarabia. In 1940, after the Soviet occupation of Bessarabia and Northern Bukovina, he moved to Cluj, where he published his most famous novel: Hat nap és a hetedik („Six days and seventh”). He was a contributor to the Korunk newspaper. In 1941 he settled in Chișinău, in the Moldavian SSR.

During the Second World War he was evacuated to Central Asia; after the war he returned to Chișinău. He later settled in Bender (Tighina), where he began working on lexicographical works, and in 1946 published a Hungarian-Russian dictionary, which he updated in 1951 and 1959. In 1954, Kahana's first novel in the planned trilogy on collectivization and collective farm life, Costea Gingaș, was published in the "Moldovan language" (the official designation for Romanian in the Moldavian SSR). In 1956, the second novel was published. For the last novel, Kahana was severely criticized, being accused by USM President Andrei Lupan of revisionism. He was thus removed from Moldovan literature. He was criticised again at the Congress of the Union of Soviet Writers in 1959, having to apologize. He did not return to Moldova, but stayed in Moscow, where he worked as a translator.

=== Later years and death ===
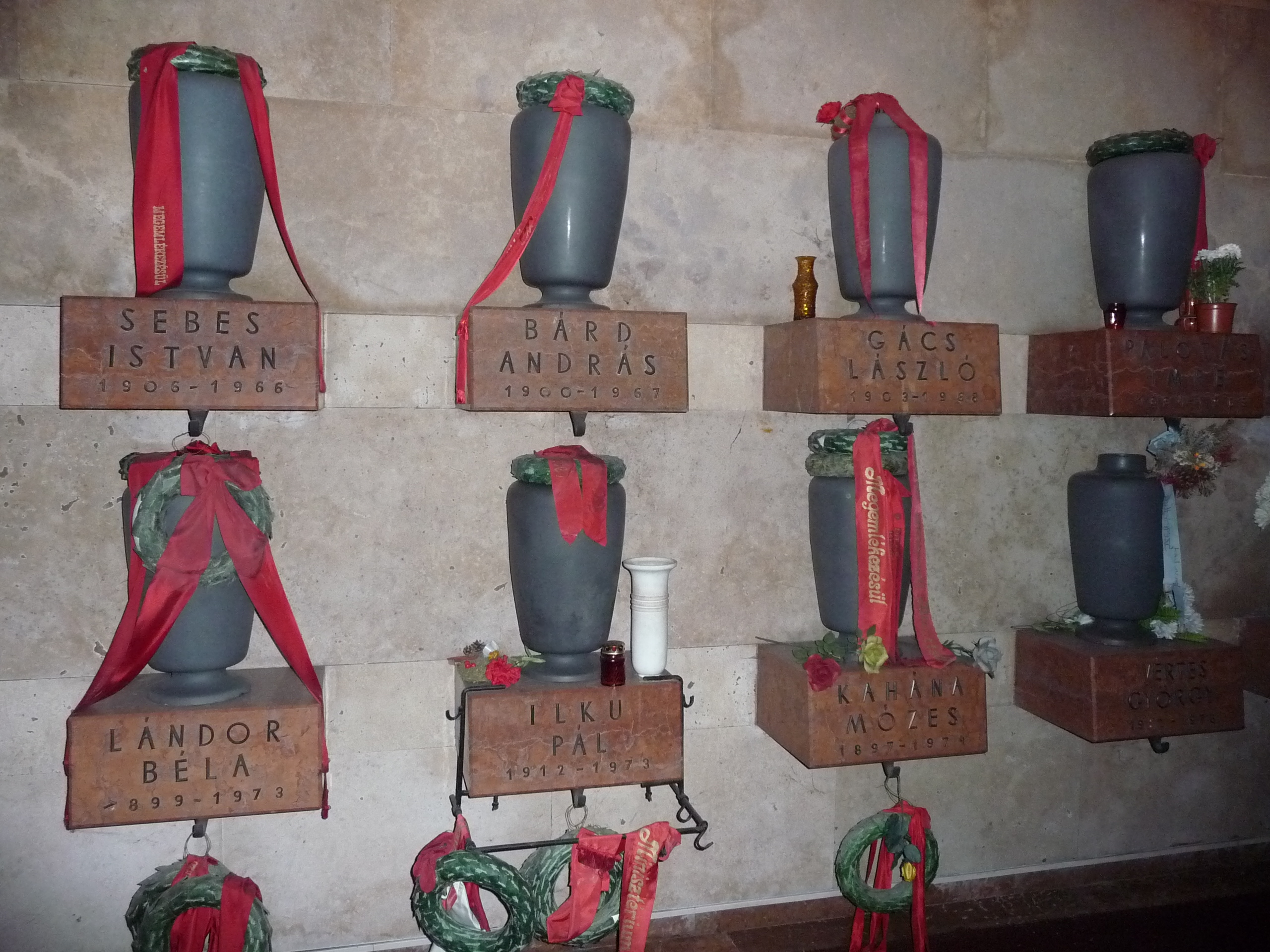
Mozes Kahana's ashes at the Kerepesi Cemetery in Budapest

In 1964, he returned to Hungary, where he continued writing and translating. He was welcomed as a master of modern Hungarian literature (he received the Attila József Prize in 1968). He joined the Hungarian Socialist Workers' Party and held various positions in the cultural sector. Successively, re-edits of his early novels appeared: Biharvári taktika (1965), Tarackos (1971), Két nő egy képen (1974), precum și noi romane, cărți de proză scurtă și memorii: Földön, föld alatt (1967), Legyen másként (1967), Szabadság, szerelem (1968), Íratlan könyvek könyve, önéletrajzi (1969), Vízesés: Mai moldován elbeszélők (1971), Szélhordta magyarok (1971), A kölet boljdozi élet (1972), Lemegy a nap (1973), Sóvárgások könyve, önéletrajzi (1973).

Although at the time, he was one of the most famous and popular Hungarian writers, Mozes Kahana committed suicide on 11 April 1974, throwing himself out of the window of a hospital in Budapest. His ashes were stored in the Kerepesi Cemetery in Budapest.

== Legacy ==
Mozes Kahana was an important figure in socialist literary movements in Eastern Europe, particularly in Romania, Moldova, Russia and Hungary, contributing to proletarian literature and socialist realism. His works and translations helped shape the cultural landscape of Hungary and the Soviet Union in the 20th century.
