= Cupaș =

- Location within Romania

Location
- Country: Romania
- Counties: Harghita, Neamț

Physical characteristics
- Source: Hășmaș Mountains
- Mouth: Bicaz
  - coordinates: 46.8052°N 25.8069°E
- Length: 7 km (4.3 mi)
- Basin size: 13 km^{2} (5.0 sq mi)

Basin features
- Progression: Bicaz→ Bistrița→ Siret→ Danube→ Black Sea

The Cupaș is a left tributary of the river Bicaz in Romania. The lower reach of the river defines the border between Harghita and Neamț counties. Its length is 7 km (4.3 mi) and its basin size is 13 km^{2} (5.0 sq mi). It discharges into the Bicaz in the Bicaz Gorge, near the village Lacu Roșu.
