= Bicaz-Stejaru Hydroelectric Power Station =

Izvorul Muntelui (Bicaz) Dam
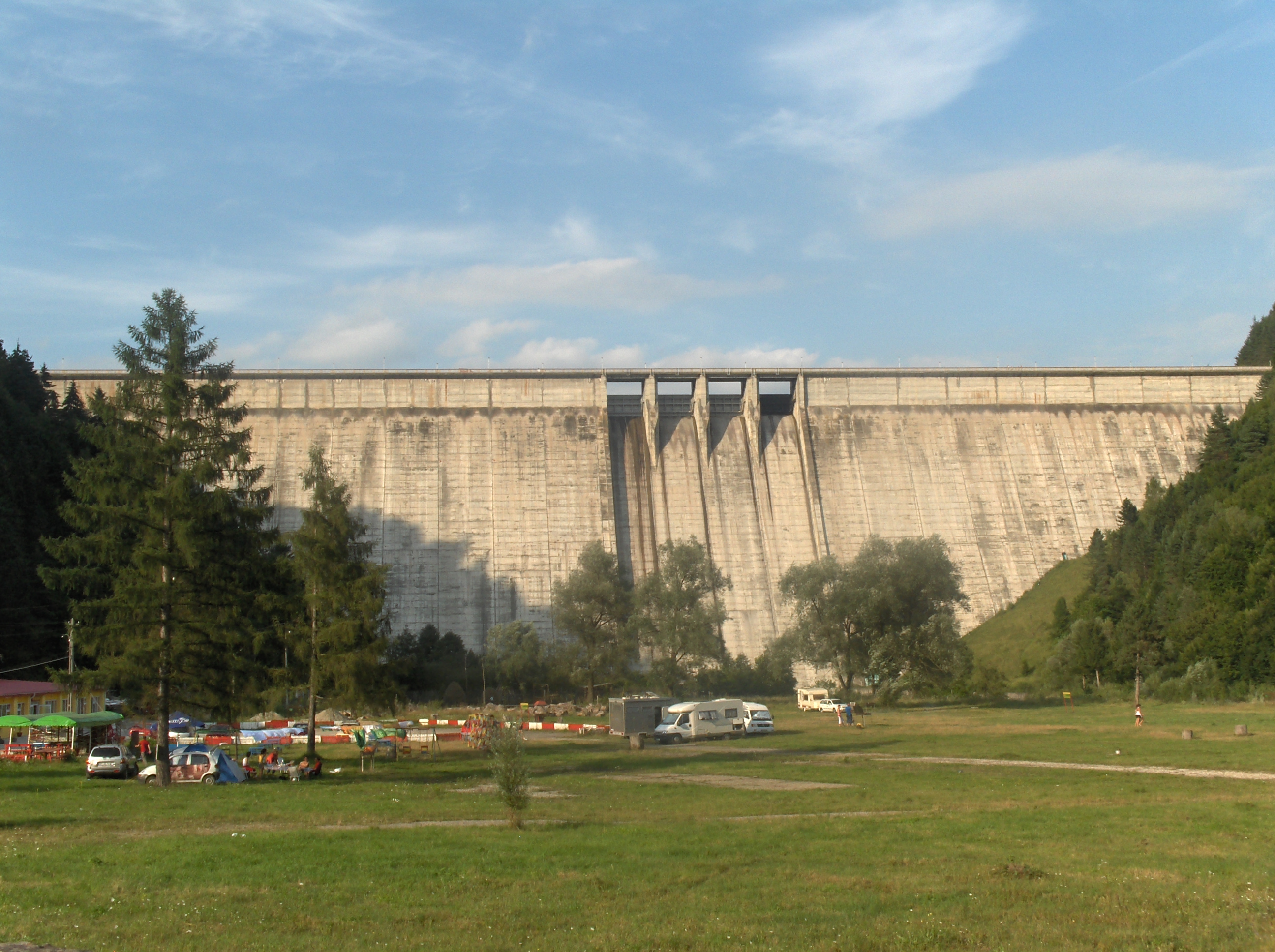
- Izvorul Muntelui Dam
- Interactive map of Izvorul Muntelui (Bicaz) Dam
- Location: Bicaz, Neamț County, Romania
- Coordinates: 46°56′17.92″N 26°6′11.41″E
- Construction began: 1950
- Opening date: 1960

Dam and spillways
- Impounds: Bistrița River
- Height: 127 m (417 ft)
- Length: 435 m (1,427 ft)
- Width (base): 119 m (390 ft)

Reservoir
- Creates: Izvorul Muntelui Lake
- Total capacity: 1.23 km^{3} (0.30 mi^{3})
- Catchment area: 4,025 km^{2} (1,554 mi^{2})
- Surface area: 310 km^{2} (120 mi^{2})

Power Station
- Installed capacity: 210 MW
- Annual generation: 500 GWh

Dimitrie Leonida (Stejaru) Hydro Power Plant is a hydropower development on the Bistrița River, near Bicaz, Romania.

The project was started and finished in the 1950s. It consists of a dam, a reservoir, and a hydro power plant.

The dam is a reinforced concrete structure with a height of 127 m (417 ft). It formed and holds the Bicaz Lake reservoir, also known as Mountain Spring Lake ("Lacul Izvorul Muntelui").

The reservoir is the largest artificial lake in Romania; it manages river levels downstream, provides fishing, attracts tourism, fuels the power plant, and controls flooding.

The Oak Hydro-power plant ("Hidrocentrala Stejaru") is equipped with six turbines (four-27.5 MW and two-50 MW turbines) for a total installed capacity of 210 MW. The plant generates an average of 500 GWh of electricity per year, at a capacity factor of 30%; it has produced over 20 billion MWh of electricity in the first 50 years since commissioning.

== See also ==
- Izvorul Muntelui Lake
