= Ceahlău Massif =

Mountain in Romania

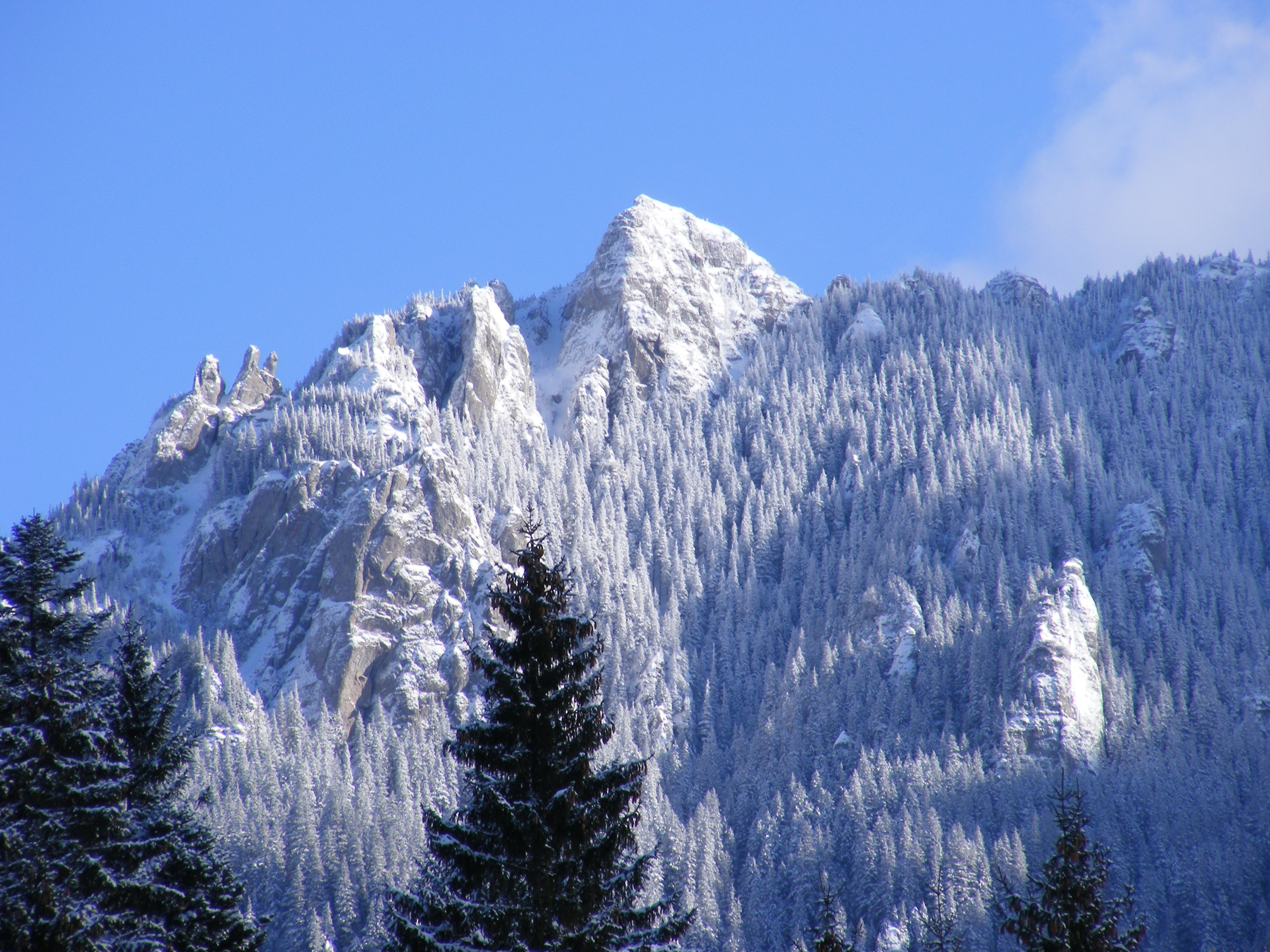

Highest point
- Elevation: 1,907 m (6,257 ft)
- Coordinates: 46.955°N 25.9457°E

Geography
- Location: Neamț County, Romania
- Parent range: Eastern Carpathians

Geology
- Rock age: Cretaceous
- Mountain type: Intrusive

3D - Ceahlău

The Ceahlău Massif (pronounced [tʃe̯ahˈləw]) is one of the most famous mountains of Romania. It is part of the Bistrița Mountains range of the Eastern Carpathians division, in Neamț County, in the Moldavia region. The two most important peaks are Toaca (1904 m elevation) and Ocolașul Mare (1907 m elevation). It is bounded to the east by the river Bistrița and Lake Bicaz, to the south by the river Bicaz. From the south, the main access point is the village of Izvorul Muntelui, located 12 km north from the town of Bicaz. To the north, Mount Ceahlău is also accessible from Durău.

== Activities ==
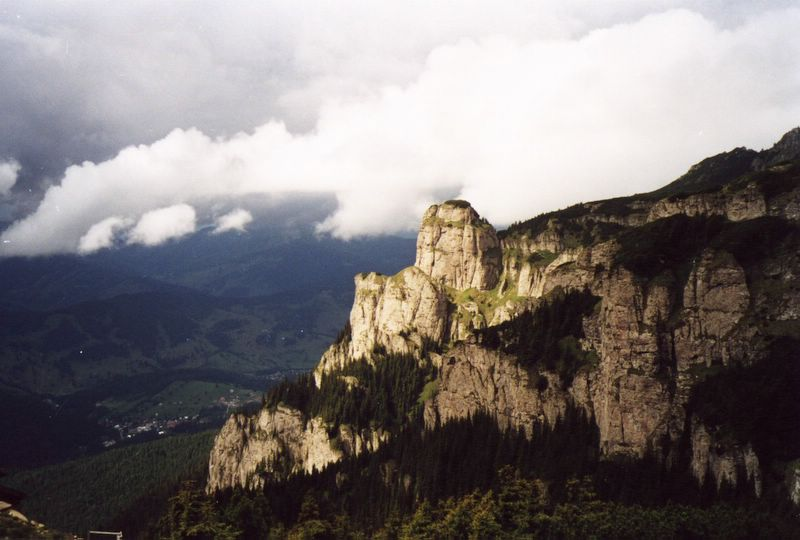
Ceahlău - "Piatra Lată din Ghedeon" rock formation

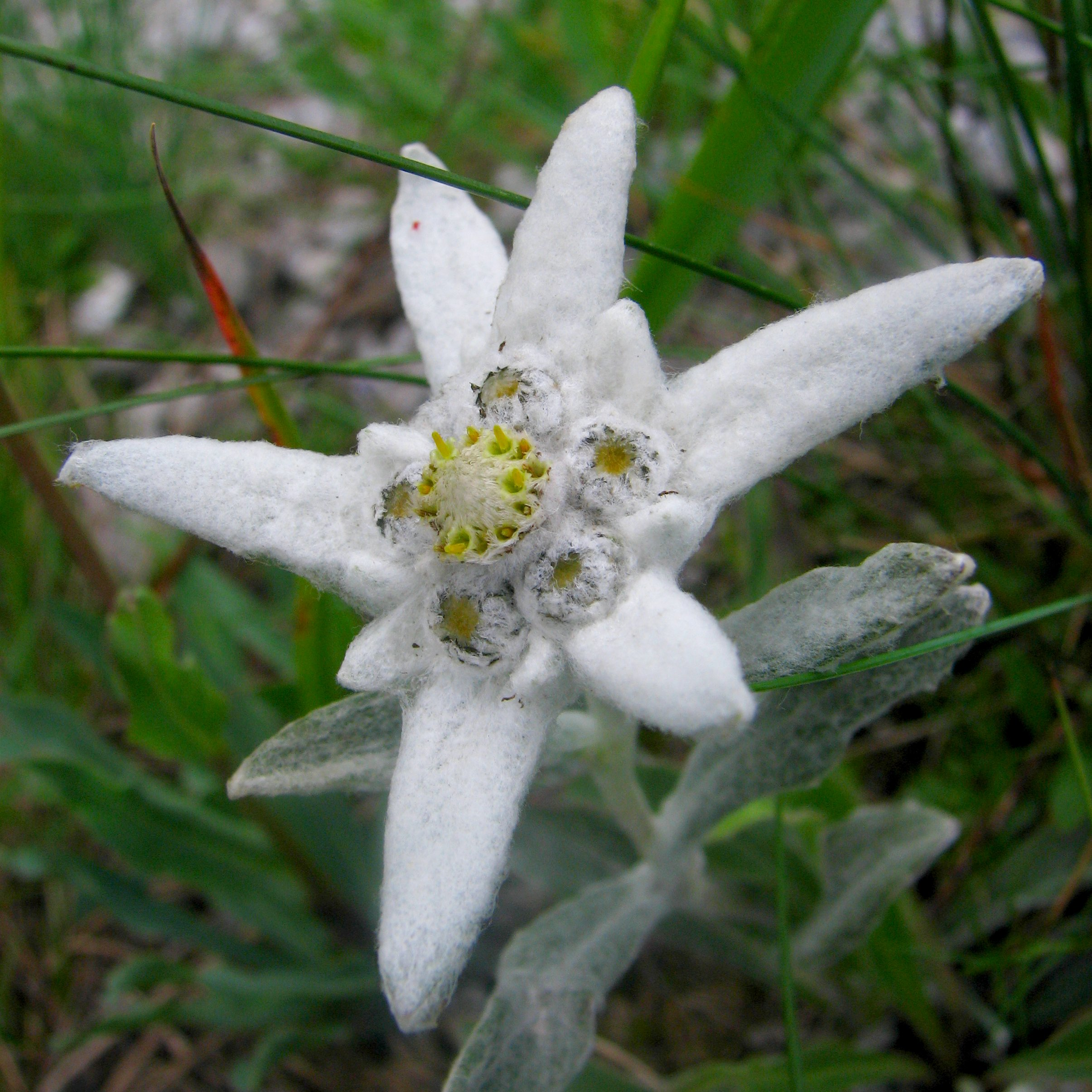
Leontopodium alpinum, edelweiss or floare de colț is a protected species in Romania since 1933

Ceahlău National Park shelters a large variety of flora and fauna; some of the species are endemic or rarely seen elsewhere in Romania.

=== Hiking ===
Mount Ceahlău is a popular hiking destination in Romania. There are seven main marked trails built for hikers and tourists. There are entry fees for visiting Ceahlău National Park. and fines for not respecting the park's regulations. The park is monitored by local rangers, and there is also a mountain rescue service (Salvamont).

=== Skiing ===
There are ski slopes located at Durău.

=== Camping ===
Camping is permitted only in a few designated places: in Durău, near Dochia Chalet, and in Izvorul Muntelui.

=== Chalets and refuges ===
- Izvorul Muntelui Chalet (757 m elevation, basecamp), near Bicaz
- Dochia Chalet (1750 m, near Toaca Peak)
- Fântânele Chalet (1220m, near Durău)
- Ceahlău - Toaca weather station

=== Notable sights and places ===
- Duruitoarea waterfall
- Panaghia rock
- Piatra Lată din Ghedeon rock formation
- Ocolașul Mic Peak
- Dochia Rock
- Turnul lui Butu Stone
- Poiana Maicilor (engl: Nuns' glade)
- Poiana Stănile
- Polița cu crini protected area
- Gardul Stănilelor

== Climate ==
Ceahlău has a subarctic climate (Köppen Dfc) bordering on tundra climate (Köppen ET). The climate is characterized by cool summers and cold winters, with an annual mean temperature of 1.3 °C at the Toaca meteorological station (1,897 m). Despite its high elevation, the massif has recorded exceptionally high temperatures during intense heat waves. The absolute maximum temperature recorded at Toaca is 30.5 °C, measured in August 1957. Other notable monthly record highs include 29.6 °C in July (1956 and 1957), 27.6 °C in June 1957, 27.4 °C in May 1958, 22.4 °C in April 1956, and 16.6 °C in March 1957. The absolute minimum temperature recorded at the station is −26.4 °C.

Climate data for Ceahlău Toaca, 1991-2020 (elevation 1897m)
| Month | Jan | Feb | Mar | Apr | May | Jun | Jul | Aug | Sep | Oct | Nov | Dec | Year |
|---|---|---|---|---|---|---|---|---|---|---|---|---|---|
| Record high °C (°F) | 8.1 (46.6) | 11.6 (52.9) | 16.6 (61.9) | 22.4 (72.3) | 27.4 (81.3) | 27.6 (81.7) | 29.6 (85.3) | 30.5 (86.9) | 24.0 (75.2) | 19.8 (67.6) | 17.6 (63.7) | 10.4 (50.7) | 30.5 (86.9) |
| Mean daily maximum °C (°F) | −5.0 (23.0) | −4.6 (23.7) | −2.1 (28.2) | 3.4 (38.1) | 9.3 (48.7) | 13.2 (55.8) | 15.1 (59.2) | 15.2 (59.4) | 10.1 (50.2) | 5.7 (42.3) | 1.2 (34.2) | −3.5 (25.7) | 4.8 (40.7) |
| Daily mean °C (°F) | −7.7 (18.1) | −7.6 (18.3) | −5.4 (22.3) | −0.2 (31.6) | 5.2 (41.4) | 8.9 (48.0) | 10.7 (51.3) | 10.9 (51.6) | 6.2 (43.2) | 2.3 (36.1) | −1.6 (29.1) | −6.2 (20.8) | 1.3 (34.3) |
| Mean daily minimum °C (°F) | −10.2 (13.6) | −10.2 (13.6) | −8.0 (17.6) | −2.7 (27.1) | 2.4 (36.3) | 6.0 (42.8) | 7.7 (45.9) | 8.1 (46.6) | 3.6 (38.5) | −0.2 (31.6) | −4.1 (24.6) | −8.6 (16.5) | −1.3 (29.6) |
| Record low °C (°F) | −25.2 (−13.4) | −25.8 (−14.4) | −23.8 (−10.8) | −15.6 (3.9) | −11.8 (10.8) | −4.5 (23.9) | −1.4 (29.5) | −1.8 (28.8) | −6.6 (20.1) | −16.2 (2.8) | −20.3 (−4.5) | −26.4 (−15.5) | −26.4 (−15.5) |
| Average precipitation mm (inches) | 25.0 (0.98) | 28.3 (1.11) | 36.3 (1.43) | 49.5 (1.95) | 82.4 (3.24) | 122.4 (4.82) | 110.3 (4.34) | 93.5 (3.68) | 49.2 (1.94) | 41.0 (1.61) | 24.8 (0.98) | 30.6 (1.20) | 693.3 (27.28) |
| Average precipitation days (≥ 1.0 mm) | 7.0 | 7.5 | 9.1 | 9.5 | 13.0 | 13.5 | 12.4 | 10.3 | 7.6 | 6.8 | 5.9 | 7.2 | 109.8 |
| Mean monthly sunshine hours | 82.4 | 90.1 | 112.4 | 145.9 | 179.5 | 186.7 | 208.1 | 217.7 | 157.2 | 145.9 | 110.4 | 81.7 | 1,718 |
Source 1: NOAA, Primăria Ceahlău
Source 2: Meteomanz (extremes since 2021)

== Other uses of the name ==
- Ceahlăul Stadium, in Piatra Neamț
- FC Ceahlăul Piatra Neamț, a Romanian soccer team

== See also ==
- Seven Natural Wonders of Romania
