= Bicaz (river) =

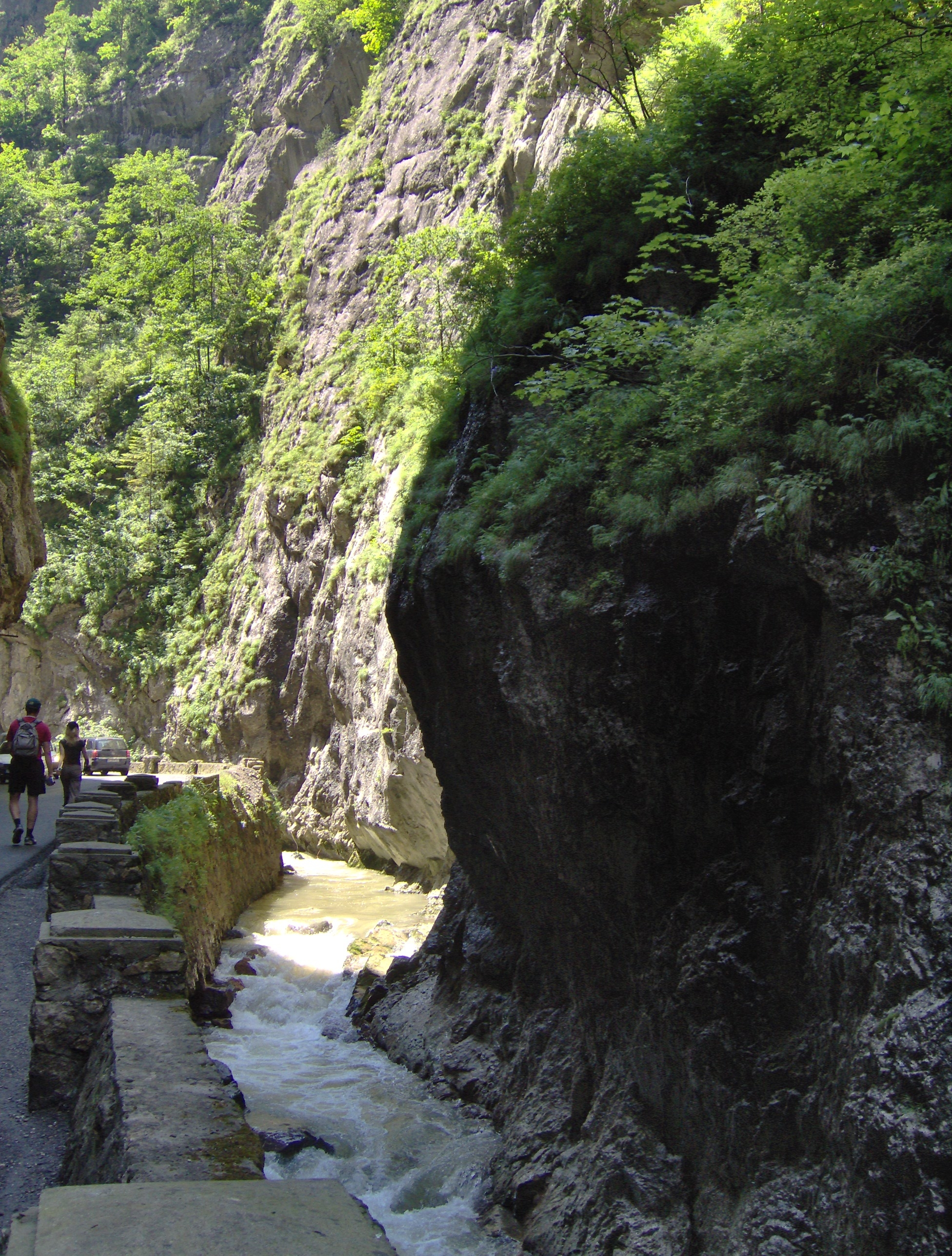
- View of the Bicaz Gorge

- Location within Romania

Location
- Country: Romania
- Counties: Harghita, Neamț
- Villages: Lacu Roșu, Bicaz-Chei, Bicazu Ardelean, Tașca

Physical characteristics
- Source: Hășmaș Mountains
- Mouth: Bistrița
  - location: Bicaz
  - coordinates: 46.9116°N 26.0918°E
- Length: 39 km (24 mi)
- Basin size: 566 km^{2} (219 sq mi)

Basin features
- Progression: Bistrița→ Siret→ Danube→ Black Sea

The Bicaz (Hungarian: Békás-patak) is a right tributary of the river Bistrița in Romania. Its source is in the Hășmaș Mountains. Its uppermost course, upstream from Red Lake (Lacul Roșu), is also called Vereșchiu. Other tributaries of Lacul Roșu are Pârâul Oii (Oaia), Licoș and Suhard. It discharges into the Bistrița in the town Bicaz. The Romanian name derives from the Hungarian name, which means literally frog-rivulet (hun.: béka = frog). Its length is 39 km (24 mi) and its basin size is 566 km^{2} (219 sq mi).

The main tributaries of the river are:

- Left bank tributaries: Licoș, Suhard, Cupaș, Lapoș, Șugău, Țepeșeni, Capra (or Pârâul Jidanului), Chișirig, Pârâul Izvorului, Neagra, Tașca, Hamzoaia
- Right bank tributaries: Pârâul Oii, Bicăjel, Bardoș, Surduc, Dămuc, Ticoș, Floarea, Secu

The Bicaz Gorge is part of the Cheile Bicazului-Hășmaș National Park.
