= Asău (Trotuș) =

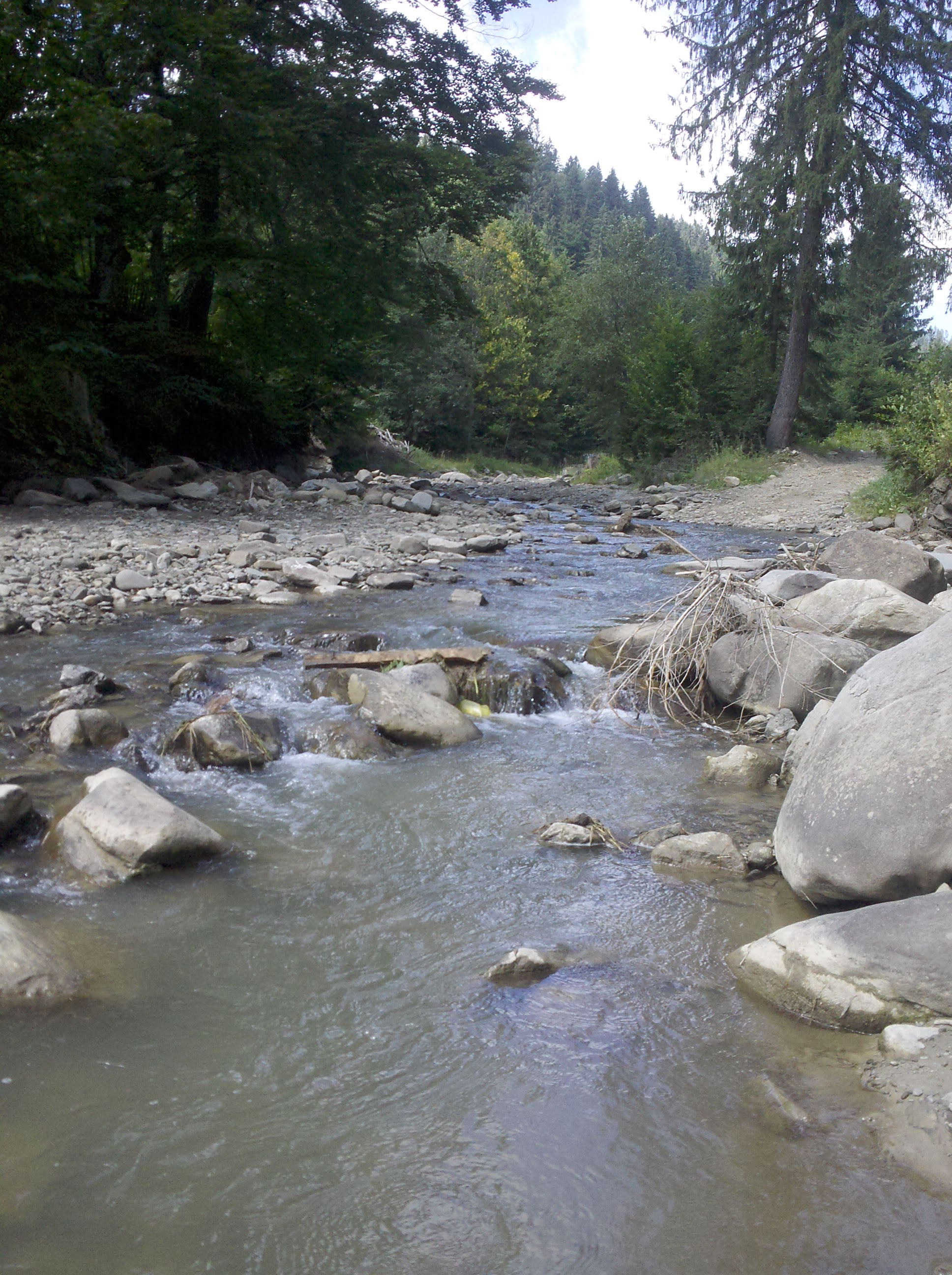

- Location within Romania

Location
- Country: Romania
- Counties: Bacău County

Physical characteristics
- Source: Tarcău Mountains
- Mouth: Trotuș
  - location: Asău
  - coordinates: 46.4342°N 26.4058°E
- Length: 39 km (24 mi)
- Basin size: 208 km^{2} (80 sq mi)

Basin features
- Progression: Trotuș→ Siret→ Danube→ Black Sea

The Asău is a left tributary of the river Trotuș in Romania. Its source is located in the Tarcău Mountains. It discharges into the Trotuș in the village Asău, near Comănești. Its length is 39 km (24 mi) and its basin size is 208 km^{2} (80 sq mi).

== Tributaries ==
The following rivers are tributaries to the river Asău (from source to mouth):

- Left: Asăul Mic, Geamănele Mari, Izvorul Negru, Rugina, Rășcoiu, Păltiniș, Izvorul Alb, Pârâul Tulbure
- Right: Preotese, Cetățeni, Pârâul Caprei, Pârâul lui Iacob, Agăstin, Barta, Chicera
