= Tarcău =

- Commune
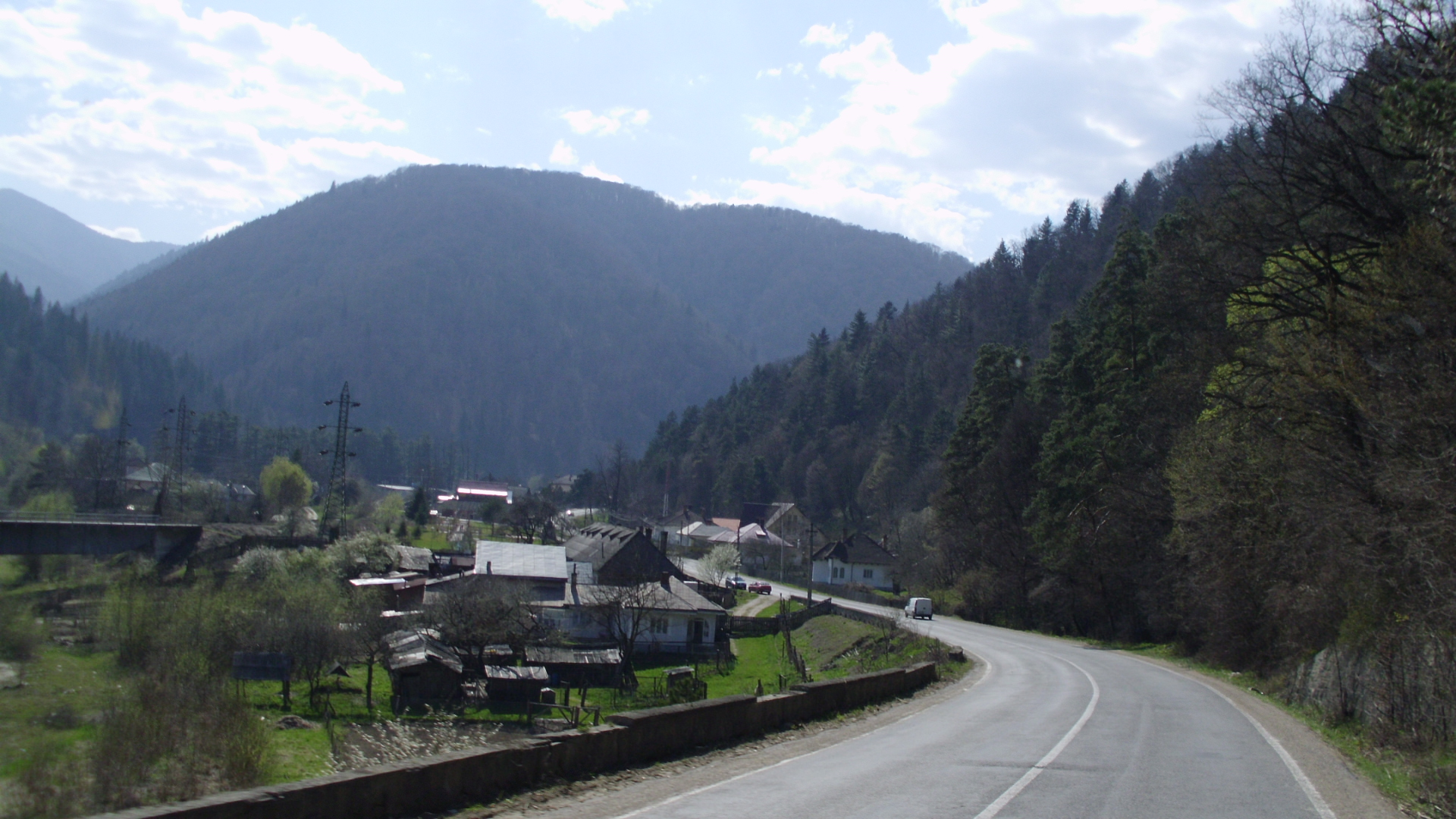

- Location in Neamț County

- Location in Romania
- Coordinates: 46°52′N 26°8′E
- Country: Romania
- County: Neamț

Government
  - Mayor (2024–2028): Manole-Dănuț Fîrțală (PNL)
- Area: 398.90 km^{2} (154.02 sq mi)
- Elevation: 392 m (1,286 ft)
- Population (2021-12-01): 2,952
  - Density: 7.400/km^{2} (19.17/sq mi)
- Time zone: UTC+02:00 (EET)
  - Summer (DST): UTC+03:00 (EEST)
- Postal code: 617445
- Area code: +(40) 233
- Vehicle reg.: NT
- Website: tarcau.ro

Tarcău is a commune in Neamț County, Western Moldavia, Romania. It is composed of six villages: Ardeluța, Brateș, Cazaci, Schitu Tarcău, Straja, and Tarcău.

The commune is located in the southwestern part of the county, on the border with Bacău County. It is nestled in the foothills of the Tarcău Mountains, a mountain range of the Eastern Carpathians. It lies on the banks of the Bistrița River; the Tarcău River discharges into the Bistrița in Tarcău village, while the Tărcuța flows into the Tarcău in Ardeluța village and the Bolovăniș flows into the Tarcău in Schitu Tarcău village.

Tarcău commune is traversed by National Road DN15, which connects it to the town of Bicaz, 5 km (3.1 mi) to the west, and to the county seat, the city of Piatra Neamț, 24 km (15 mi) to the east. The Tarcău Neamț train station serves CFR Line 509, which runs from Bacău to Piatra Neamț to Bicaz.

The Sihăstria Tarcăului Monastery is located în Schitu Tarcău village. The Brateș fauna reserve is also located on the administrative territory of the commune.

Historical population
Year	Pop.	±%
1928	1,975	—
1940	2,628	+33.1%
1992	3,538	+34.6%
2002	3,560	+0.6%
2011	3,062	−14.0%
2021	2,952	−3.6%
Source: Census data

== Natives ==
- Simion Mironaș (1965 – 2022), footballer
