= Comănești Coal Mine =

Coal mine in Romania

Comănești Coal mine
Location
- Location: Comănești, Bacău County, Romania

Production
- Products: Coal
- Production: 300,000 tonnes
- Financial year: 2008

History
- Opened: 1836

Owner
- Company: Ploieşti National Coal Company

Comănești Coal Mine is an underground mine exploitation, one of the largest in Romania located in Comănești, Bacău County with estimated coal reserves of 8.4 million tonnes. The legal entity managing the Comănești mine is the Ploieşti National Coal Company which was set up in 1957.
