= Tarcău (river) =

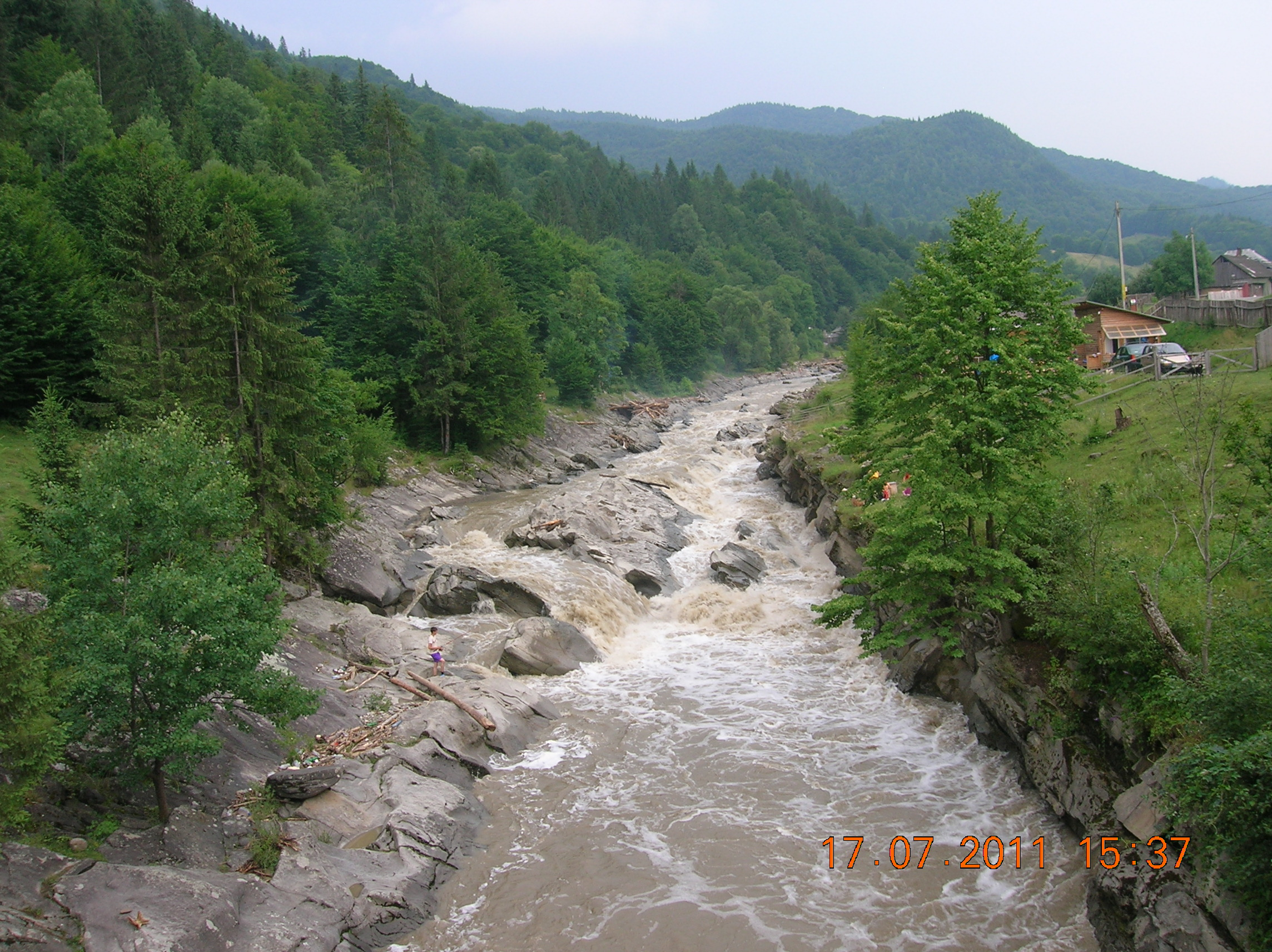

- Location within Romania

Location
- Country: Romania
- Counties: Neamț County

Physical characteristics
- Source: Mount Grindușul
  - location: Tarcău Mountains
  - coordinates: 46°38′45″N 26°09′12″E
  - elevation: 1,537 m (5,043 ft)
- Mouth: Bistrița
  - location: Tarcău
  - coordinates: 46°53′29″N 26°08′10″E
  - elevation: 403 m (1,322 ft)
- Length: 33 km (21 mi)
- Basin size: 392 km^{2} (151 sq mi)

Basin features
- Progression: Bistrița→ Siret→ Danube→ Black Sea

The Tarcău (Hungarian: Tarkő) is a right tributary of the river Bistrița in Romania. It discharges into the Bistrița in the village Tarcău. It flows through the villages Ardeluța, Schitu Tarcău, Brateș, Cazaci and Tarcău. Its length is 33 km (21 mi) and its basin size is 392 km^{2} (151 sq mi).

The Hungarian name means "baldstone". The Romanian name derives from that.

== Tributaries ==
The following rivers are tributaries to the river Tarcău:

- Left: Țapu, Tărcuța, Ardeluța, Răchita, Bolovăniș, Măierușu, Brateș, Ața, Râul Cheii, Valea Bătrâna, Cazaci, Frasinu
- Right: Răchitiș, Goșmanu, Dumitru, Cichiva, Murgoci, Pașcu, Radu, Hermanu
