= Dămuc =

- Commune
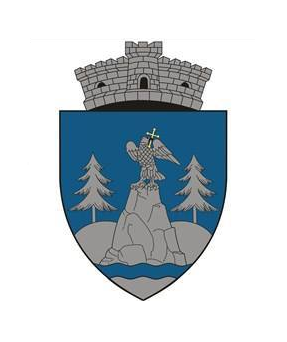
- Coat of arms

- Location in Neamț County

- Location in Romania
- Coordinates: 46°48′N 25°54′E
- Country: Romania
- County: Neamț

Government
  - Mayor (2020–2024): Ioan Voaideș (PNL)
- Area: 133.78 km^{2} (51.65 sq mi)
- Elevation: 740 m (2,430 ft)
- Population (2021-12-01): 2,780
  - Density: 20.8/km^{2} (53.8/sq mi)
- Time zone: UTC+02:00 (EET)
  - Summer (DST): UTC+03:00 (EEST)
- Postal code: 617150
- Area code: +(40) 233
- Vehicle reg.: NT
- Website: comunadamuc.ro

Dămuc (Hungarian: Damuk) is a commune in Neamț County, Romania. It is composed of three villages: Dămuc, Huisurez (Hosszúrez), and Trei Fântâni (Háromkút). Dămuc is one of three communes in Neamț County (most of which is in Western Moldavia) that are part of the historic region of Transylvania.

Historical population
Year	Pop.	±%
1850	1,136	—
1880	1,529	+34.6%
1956	2,667	+74.4%
1977	3,039	+13.9%
1992	3,100	+2.0%
2002	3,149	+1.6%
2011	2,761	−12.3%
2021	2,780	+0.7%
Source: Census data
