= Bicaz =

- Town
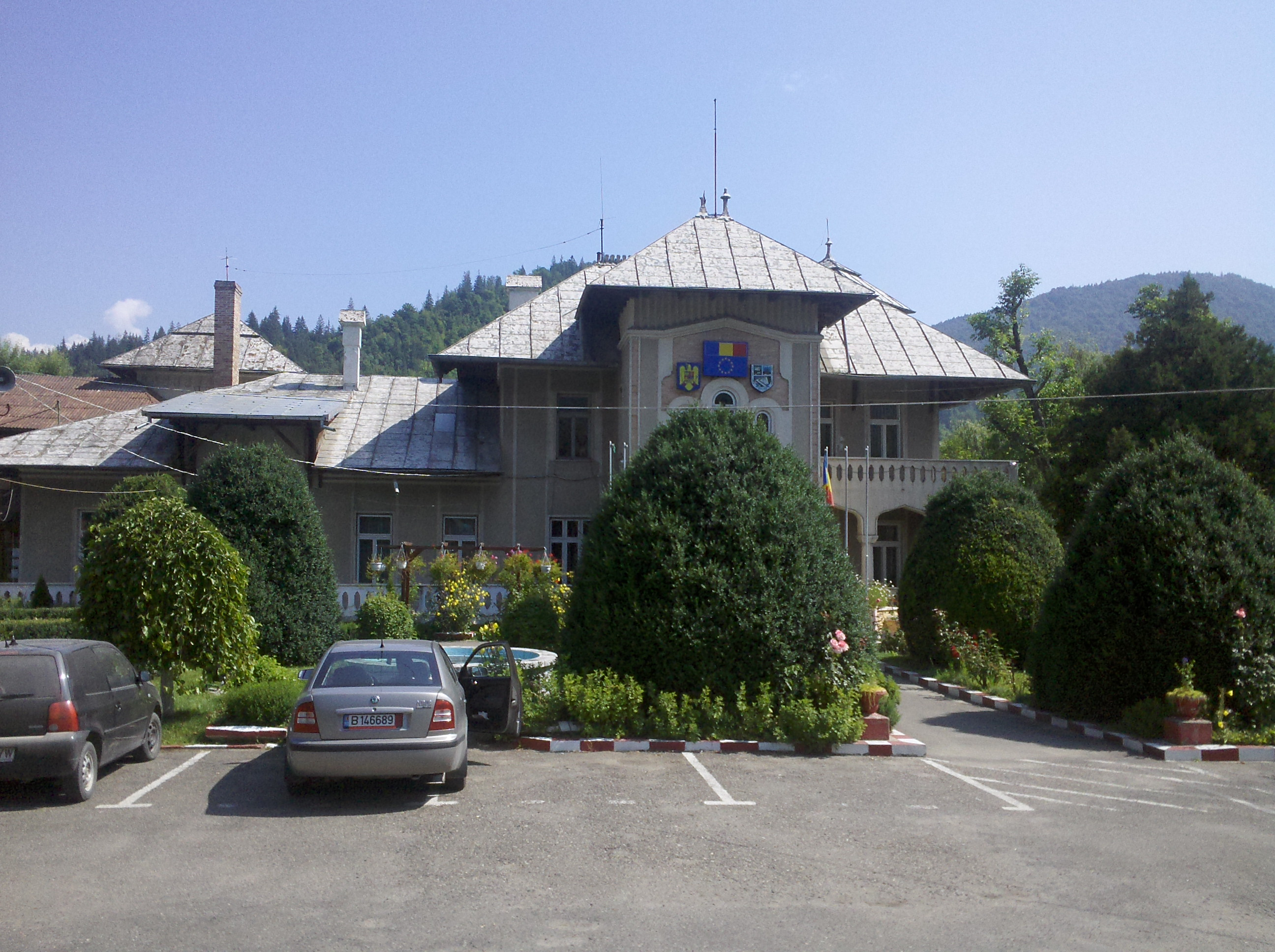
- Bicaz town hall

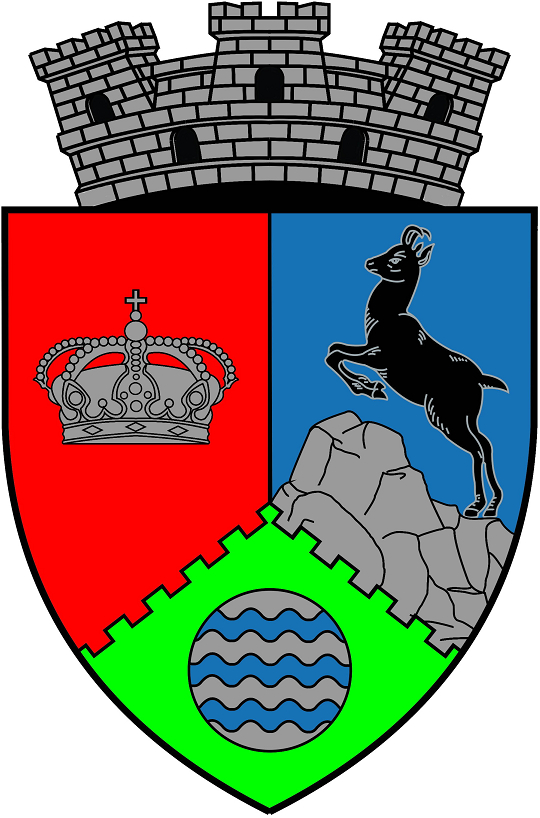
- Coat of arms

- Location in Neamț County

- Location in Romania
- Coordinates: 46°54′39″N 26°5′28″E
- Country: Romania
- County: Neamț

Government
  - Mayor (2024–2028): Iulian-Traian Matasă (PNL)
- Area: 148.9 km^{2} (57.5 sq mi)
- Elevation: 432 m (1,417 ft)
- Population (2021-12-01): 6,106
  - Density: 41.01/km^{2} (106.2/sq mi)
- Time zone: UTC+02:00 (EET)
  - Summer (DST): UTC+03:00 (EEST)
- Postal code: 615100
- Area code: (+40) 02 33
- Vehicle reg.: NT
- Website: www.primariabicaz.ro

Bicaz (Hungarian: Békás) is a town in Neamț County, Western Moldavia, Romania, is situated in the eastern Carpathian Mountains near the confluence of the Bicaz and Bistrița Rivers and near Lake Bicaz, an artificial lake formed by the Bicaz Dam on the Bistrița. Bicaz used to be a border town until 1918. Six villages are administered by the town: Capșa, Dodeni, Izvoru Alb, Izvoru Muntelui, Potoci, and Secu.

Historical population
Year	Pop.	±%
1966	8,368	—
1977	9,477	+13.3%
1992	8,581	−9.5%
2002	8,911	+3.8%
2011	6,298	−29.3%
2021	6,106	−3.0%
Source: Census data

== Economy ==
Before the construction of the dam (1950–1960), the settlement was just a mountain village in the Eastern Carpathians where the main economic activity was timber harvesting. By tradition, the tree trunks were linked together, forming a raft (pluta); a raftman (Romanian: plutaș) used to drive the raft on the Bistrița River downstream to wood processing facilities in Piatra Neamț.

Building the dam also created a horizontal industry: two cement and aggregate plants were built in Bicaz proper and nearby Tașca. This, together with the construction of the Bicaz-Stejaru Hydroelectric Power Station (10 km (6.2 mi) to the east) triggered a relative economic boom during the communist period.

The Bicaz cement plant was shut down after the Romanian Revolution of 1989 and is slowly being taken apart. On the other hand, the Tașca cement plant was acquired by the German group HeidelbergCement and was completely overhauled. The town has also a few timber factories and wood processing facilities.

== Access ==
The town has access to two national roads: DN15 and DN12C while Bicaz railway station is the terminus station on CFR Line 509 with scheduled daily service to Bucharest North. The town also served as a port with scheduled ferry service with the villages on the lakeshore in the 1960s and 1970s. Today the facility offers only seasonal leisure cruises.

== Tourism ==
The town is located in the proximity of two important tourist destinations in Romania: the Ceahlău Massif (12 km (7.5 mi) north) and Cheile Bicazului-Hășmaș National Park (25 km (16 mi) to the west). The impressive Bicaz Dam built on the river Bistrița in the 1950s (one of the biggest in Romania) and the resulting Bicaz Lake are also popular tourist sights. Durău, the only ski resort in the Ceahlău Massif, is located about 30 km (19 mi) north.

== Natives ==
- Iuliana Paleu (born 1990), sprint canoeist

== Image gallery ==
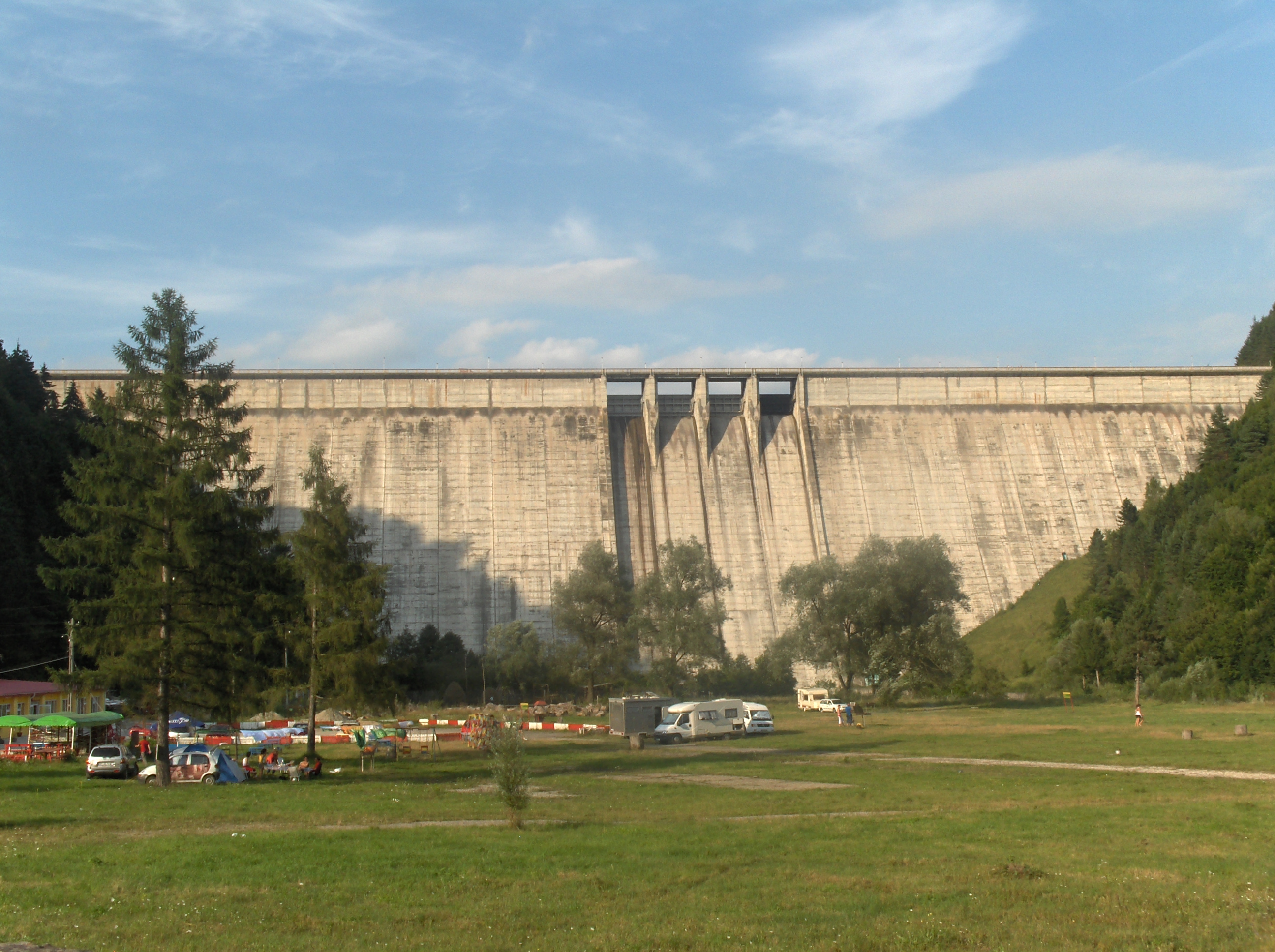
Bicaz Dam, 127 meters high, built between 1950 and 1960 on the Bistrița River

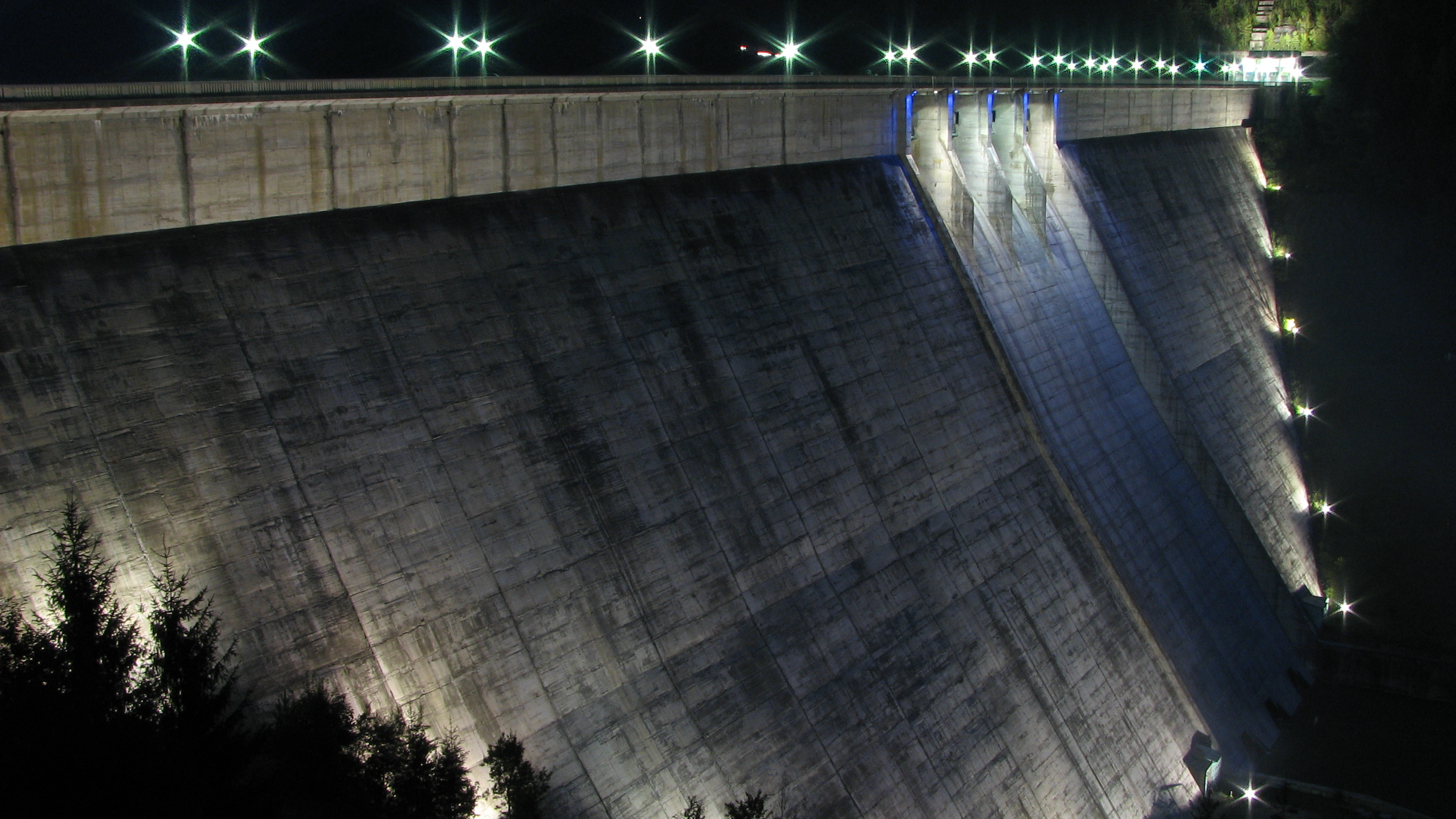
Night view of the dam

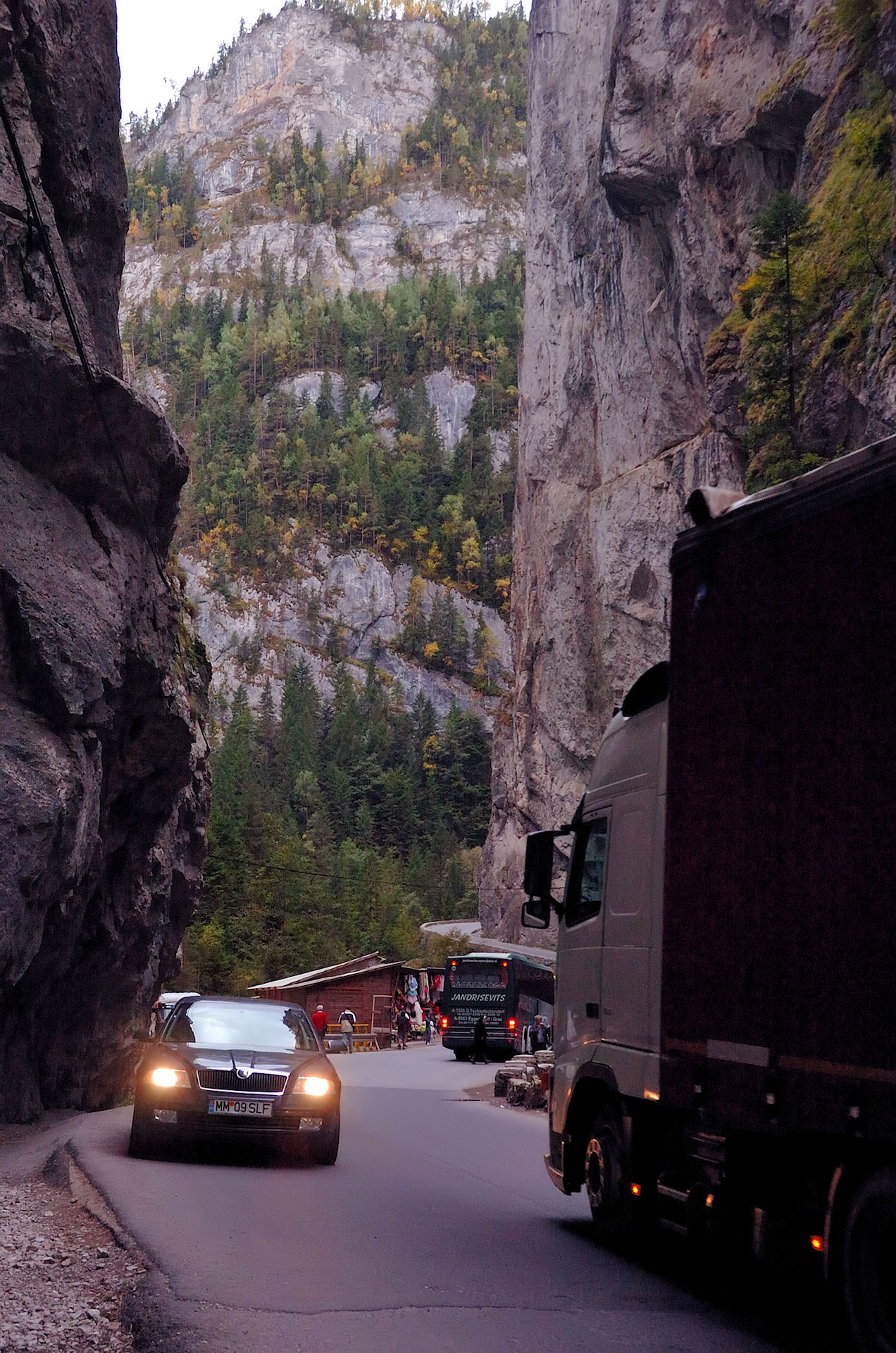
Bicaz Canyon, a narrow pass linking Romanian historical regions of Moldavia and Transylvania along DN12C national road

== See also ==
- Bicaz River
- Bicaz Canyon
- Bicaz Dam
- Lake Bicaz
- Bicaz-Stejaru Hydro Power Plant
- Ceahlău Massif
