= Comănești =

- Town
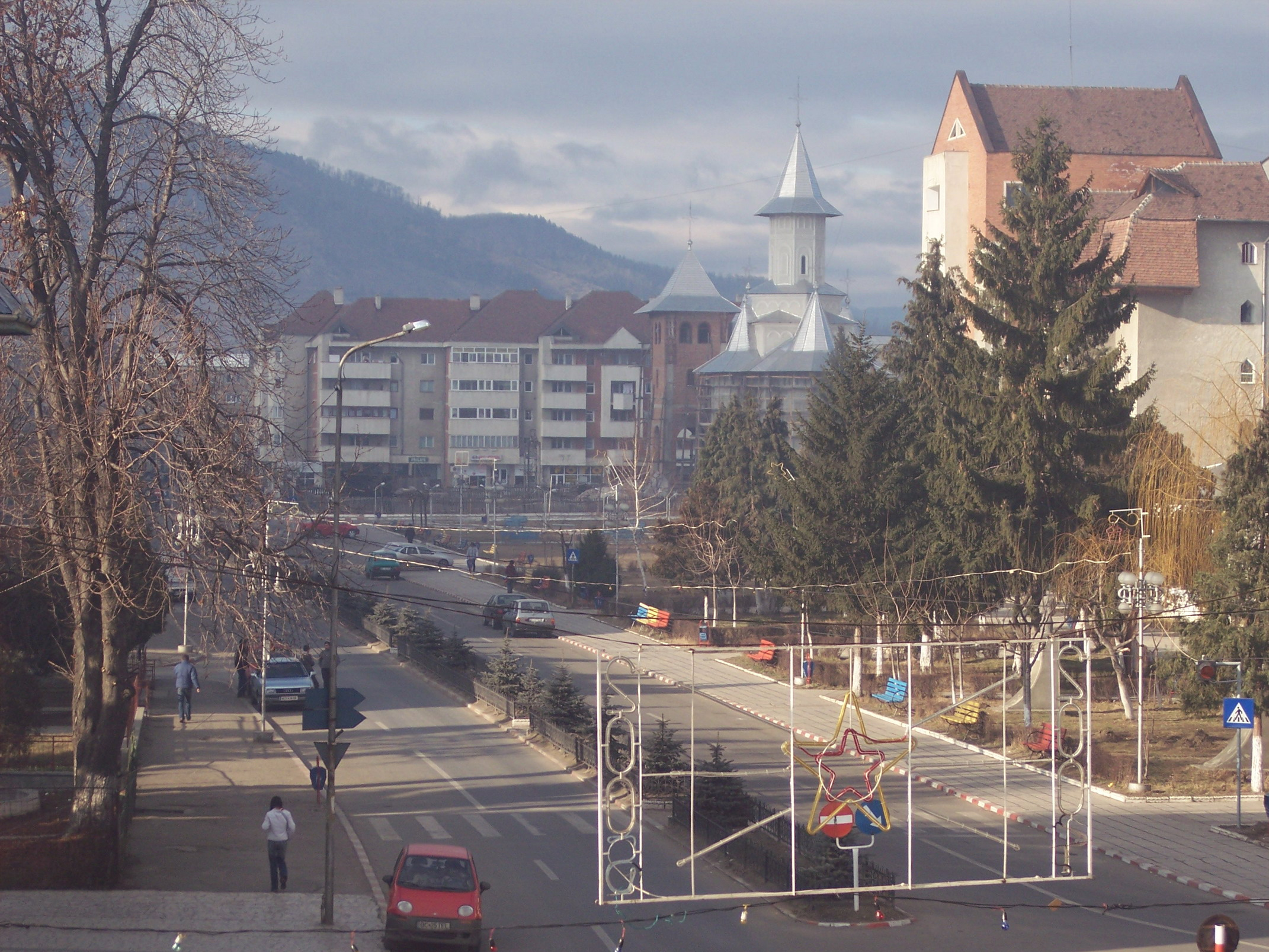
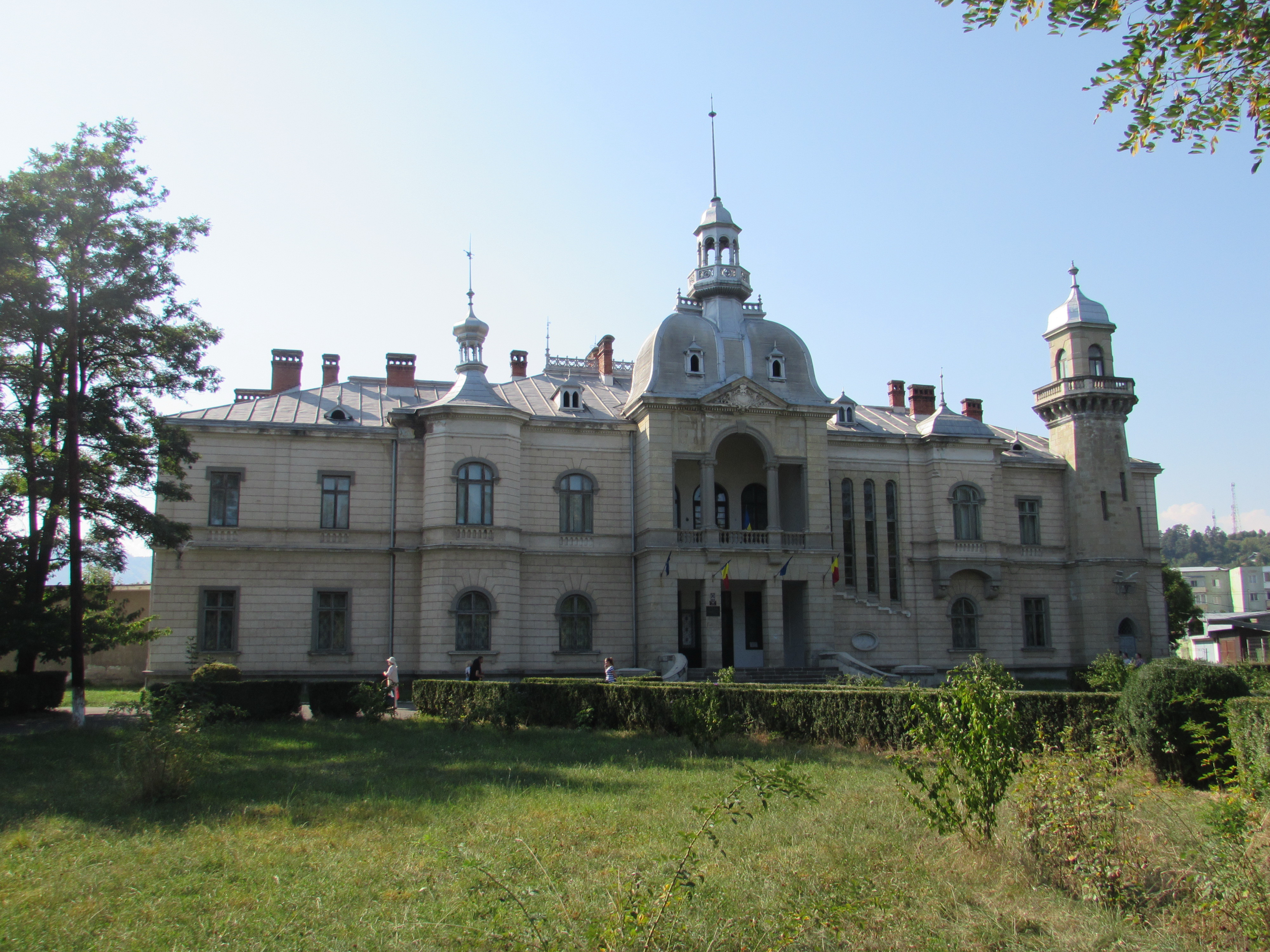
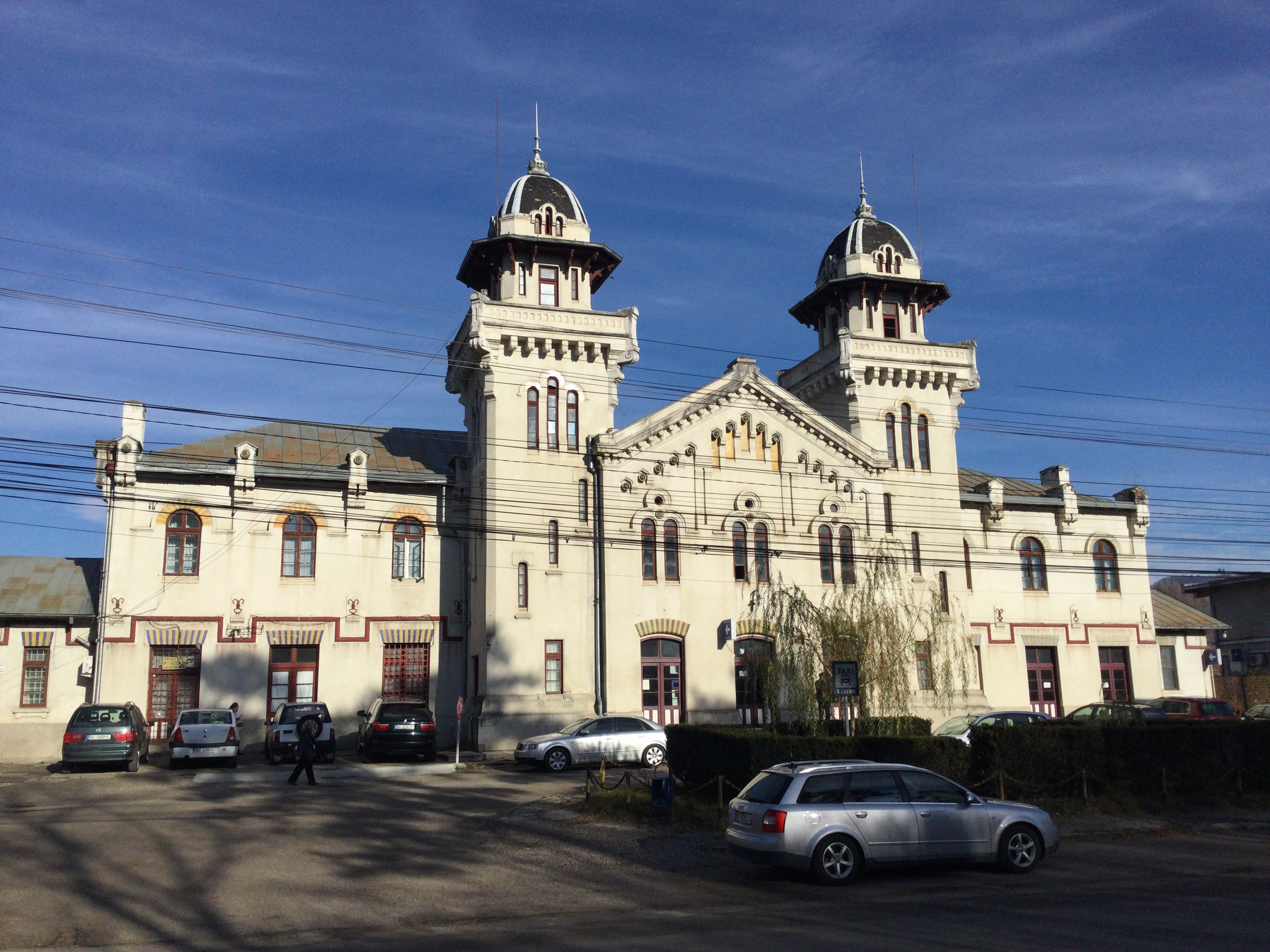
- City centre Ghika Palace Train station

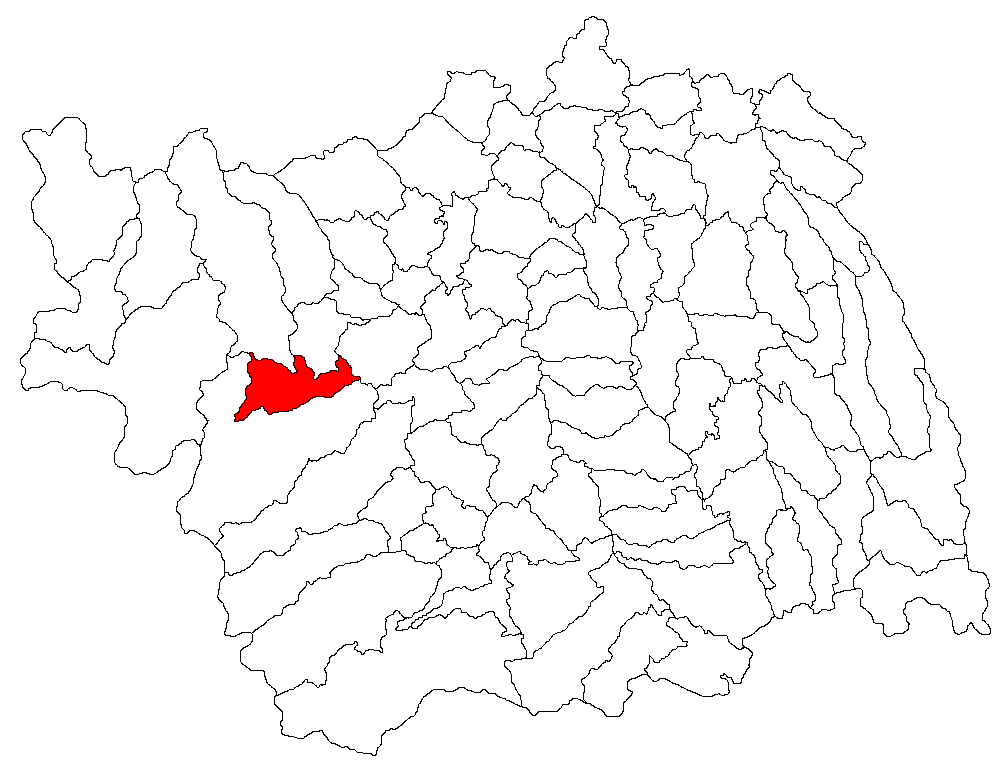
- Location in Bacău County

- Location in Romania
- Coordinates: 46°25′47″N 26°27′0″E
- Country: Romania
- County: Bacău

Government
  - Mayor (2024–2028): Viorel Miron (PNL)
- Area: 63.87 km^{2} (24.66 sq mi)
- Elevation: 400 m (1,300 ft)
- Population (2021-12-01): 19,996
  - Density: 313.1/km^{2} (810.9/sq mi)
- Time zone: UTC+02:00 (EET)
  - Summer (DST): UTC+03:00 (EEST)
- Postal code: 605200
- Area code: (+40) 02 34
- Vehicle reg.: BC
- Website: www.primariacomanesti.ro

Comănești (Romanian pronunciation: [koməˈneʃtʲ]; Hungarian: Kománfalva) is a town in Bacău County, Western Moldavia, Romania, with a population of 19,996 as of 2021. It is situated on the river Trotuș, which flows between the Ciuc and the Tarcău mountains; 10 km (6 mi) of the course of the river pass through Comănești.

The town administers two villages, Podei and Vermești.

== History ==
The area of the town of Comănești has been inhabited since the Neolithic period - Neolithic remains were found in the Vermești area of the town. The name is derived from the Cumans who once ruled the region. Its first written record dates from 1657, and its first presence on a map from the 1696 Sanson Map.

From the late 18th century onwards, the town was in the domain of the Ghica family of boyars, who remained an important presence in the area until the middle of the 20th century. The Ghica Palace (now housing the local museum), the park in front of the museum, and the railway stations are testimonies to their presence in the town.

During the summers of 2004, 2005, and 2006, Comănești suffered severe flooding of the Trotuș. Some specialists have associated those floods with the deforestation in the area. In 2006 and 2008, Comănești was the site of large explosion-like sounds that were not identified.

== Geography ==
The city is located on both banks of the Trotuș River, in the Comănești Depression of the Eastern Carpathians, between the Goșmanu Mountains, Berzunți Mountains, Nemira Mountains, and Ciuc Mountains. It is crossed by the national road DN12A, which connects Onești to Miercurea-Ciuc. In Comănești, the national road DN2G branches off from this route, leading to Moinești and Bacău. The Adjud–Comănești–Siculeni railway also passes through the city, which is served by the Comănești station.

== Demographics ==
Ethnic composition of Comănești
1. Romanians (84.7%)
2. Roma (5.01%)
3. Other ethnicities (0.12%)
4. Unknown (10.2%)
Religious composition of Comănești
1. Orthodox (83.6%)
2. Roman-Catholics (3.04%)
3. Pentecostals (1.12%)
4. Other religions (1.42%)
5. Unknown (10.8%)

According to the census conducted in 2021, the population of the city of Comănești amounts to 19,996 inhabitants, an increase compared to the previous census from 2011, when 19,568 inhabitants had been registered. The majority of the inhabitants are Romanians (84.66%), with a minority of Roma (5.01%), and for 10.22% the ethnic affiliation is unknown. From a confessional point of view, the majority of the inhabitants are Orthodox (83.64%), with minorities of Roman Catholics (3.04%) and Pentecostals (1.12%), and for 10.78% the confessional affiliation is unknown.

Historical population
Year	Pop.	±%
1956	12,392	—
1966	14,653	+18.2%
1977	16,879	+15.2%
1992	25,020	+48.2%
2002	26,237	+4.9%
2011	19,568	−25.4%
2021	19,996	+2.2%
Source: Census data

== Natives ==
- Alexandru Corban (born 1998), footballer
- Andrei Florean (born 1992), footballer
- Anca Grigoraș (born 1957), artistic gymnast
- Ionuț Iftimoaie (born 1978), kickboxer
- Ionela Loaieș (born 1979), artistic gymnast
- Iulian Petrache (born 1991), footballer
- Ilie Verdeț (1925 – 2001), communist politician, Prime Minister from 1979 to 1982

== Industry ==
As of 2003, Comănești had an unemployment rate of 18.1%, much higher than the country's average, and the town was declared an underdeveloped region.

The town is in the center of a large coal field and there are also smaller amounts of oil in the area. The Comănești Coal Mine, which in 1989 employed 5,000 people, was finally closed down in 2005, leaving the last group of miners (260 in all) unemployed. The other major industry of the town is forestry, but the large lumberyard and factory were also closed; this area of enterprise is now dominated by small local businesses, but in the last few years some international investors started to appear in the city, especially in retail and commerce.

There have been new initiatives in recent years to attract investment into the area in both the industrial and tourism sectors.

== Train station ==
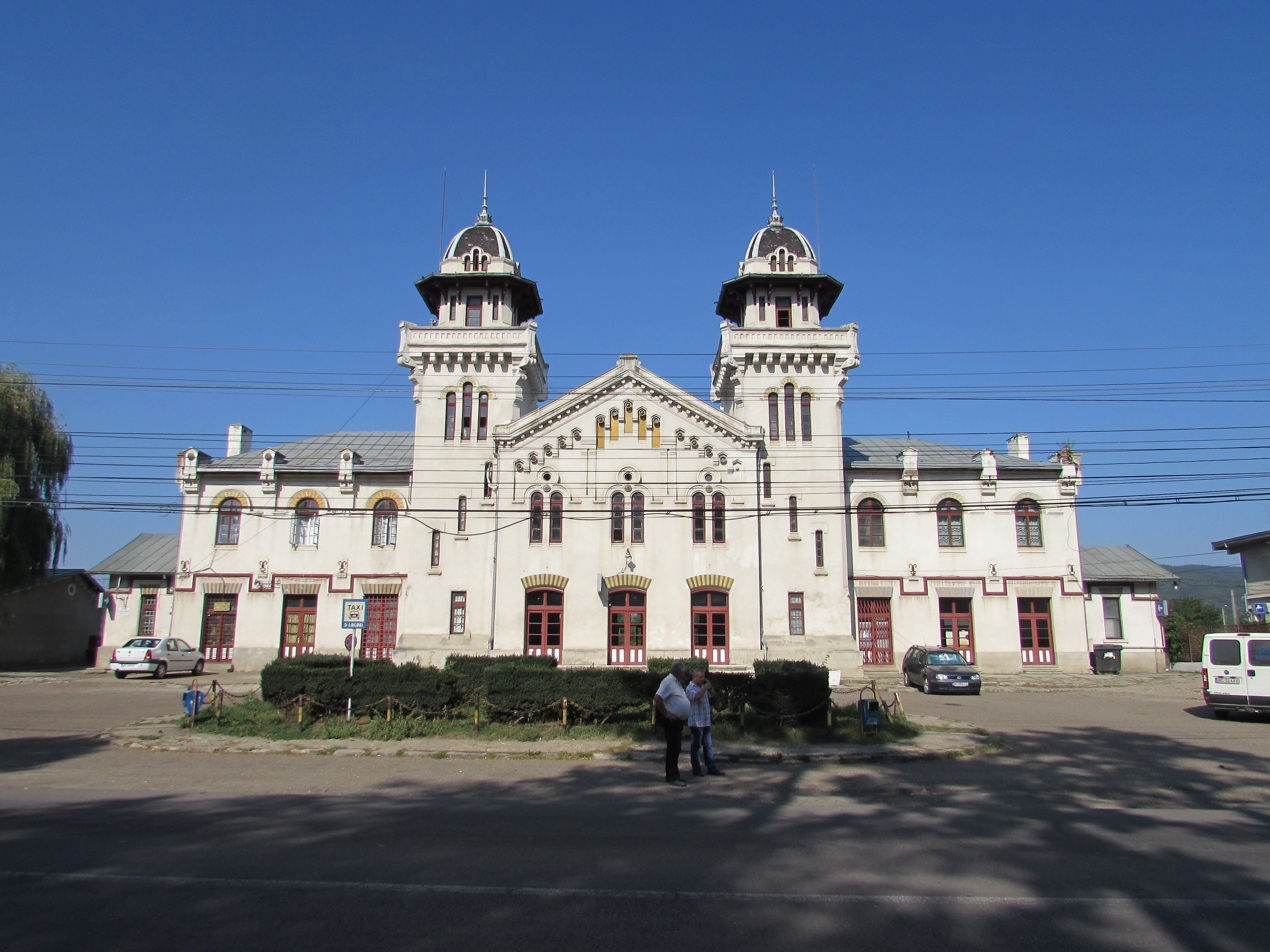
Train station

The Comănești train station was built in 1899, modeled on the Lausanne and Curtea de Argeș railway stations. The design was done by the Italian architect Giulio Magni, while the construction was done by the engineer Elie Radu.

== See also ==
- Cuman people
