= Asău =

- Commune
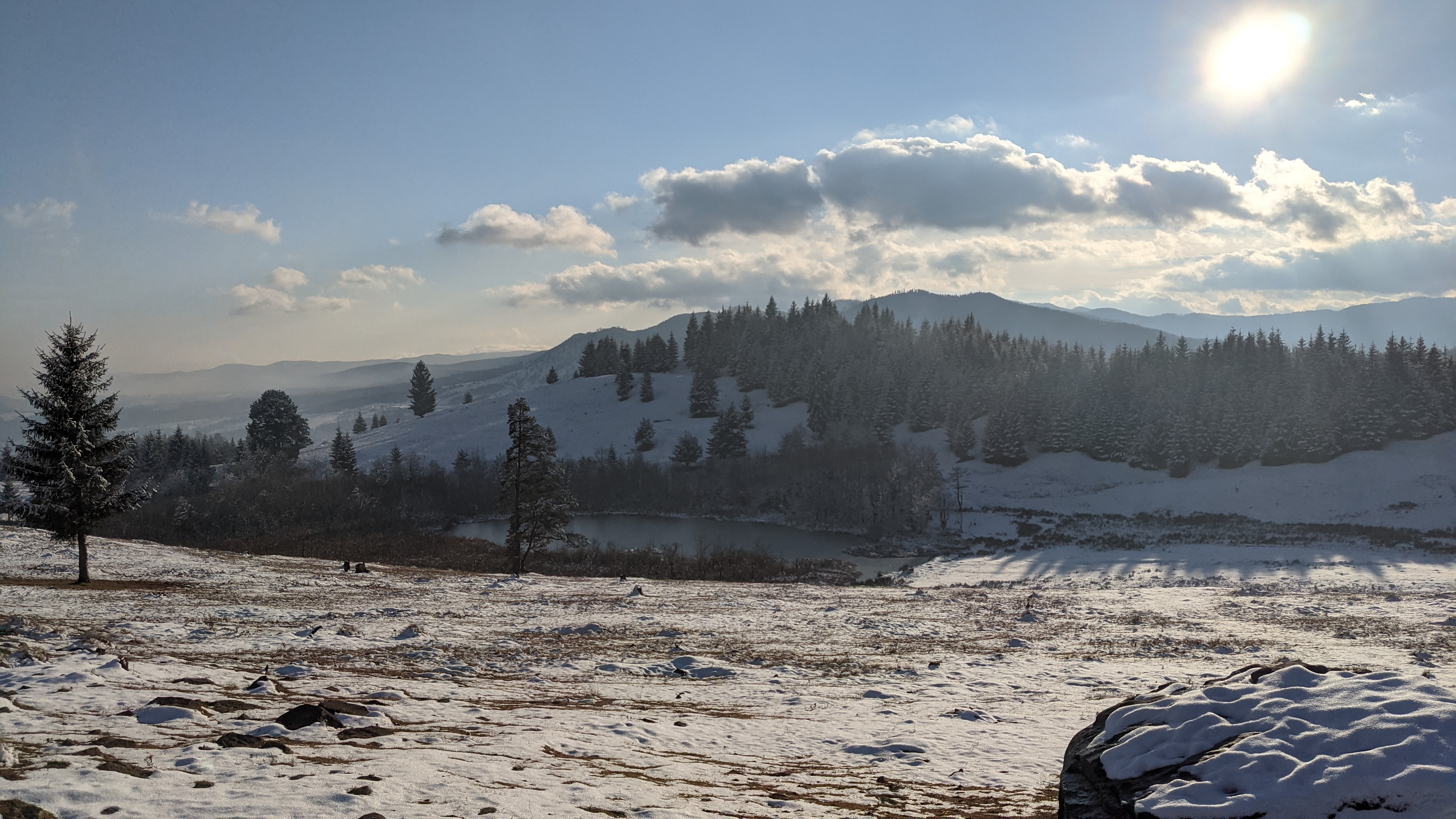
- Osoi Lake

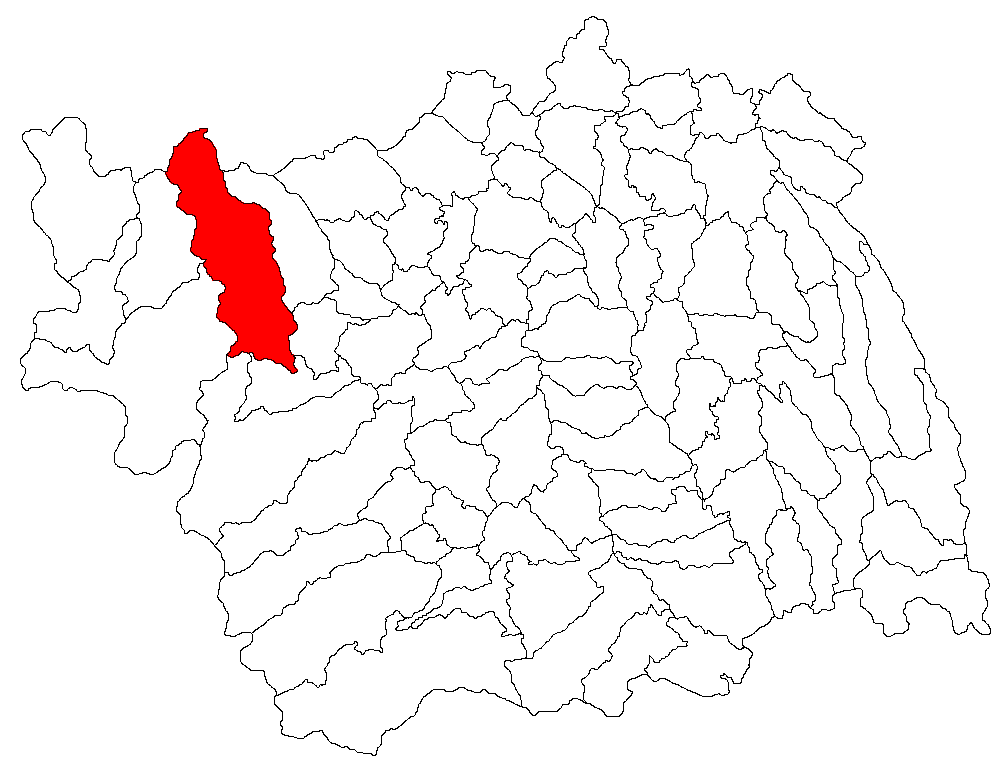
- Location in Bacău County

- Location in Romania
- Coordinates: 46°27′N 26°24′E
- Country: Romania
- County: Bacău

Government
  - Mayor (2020–2024): Emilian Budacă (PSD)
- Area: 307.45 km^{2} (118.71 sq mi)
- Elevation: 418 m (1,371 ft)
- Population (2021-12-01): 5,475
  - Density: 17.81/km^{2} (46.12/sq mi)
- Time zone: UTC+02:00 (EET)
  - Summer (DST): UTC+03:00 (EEST)
- Postal code: 607315
- Area code: (+40) 02 34
- Vehicle reg.: BC
- Website: comunaasau.ro

Asău is a commune in Bacău County, Western Moldavia, Romania. It is composed of six villages: Apa Asău, Asău, Ciobănuș, Lunca Asău, Păltiniș, and Straja.

== Location ==
The commune is located in the north-west of Bacău County, 56 km (35 mi) west of the county seat, Bacău. It is situated in a mountainous area on the border with Neamț County and covers a large part of the valley of the Asău River. The inhabited localities are concentrated in the lower reaches of this river, in the area of its confluence with the Trotuș, with the town of Comănești located southeast and 3.4 km (2.1 mi) downstream of the Asău commune.

The commune is crossed by the DN12A national road, which connects Onești with Miercurea Ciuc. The Asău and Caralița train stations serve the CFR Line 501, which joins Adjud to Siculeni.

Historical population
Year	Pop.	±%
2002	7,512	—
2011	6,698	−10.8%
2021	5,475	−18.3%
Source: Census data

== Natives ==
- Eugen Ghica-Comănești (1839–1914), explorer and politician who fought with the Union Army during the American Civil War
