= Tașca =

- Commune
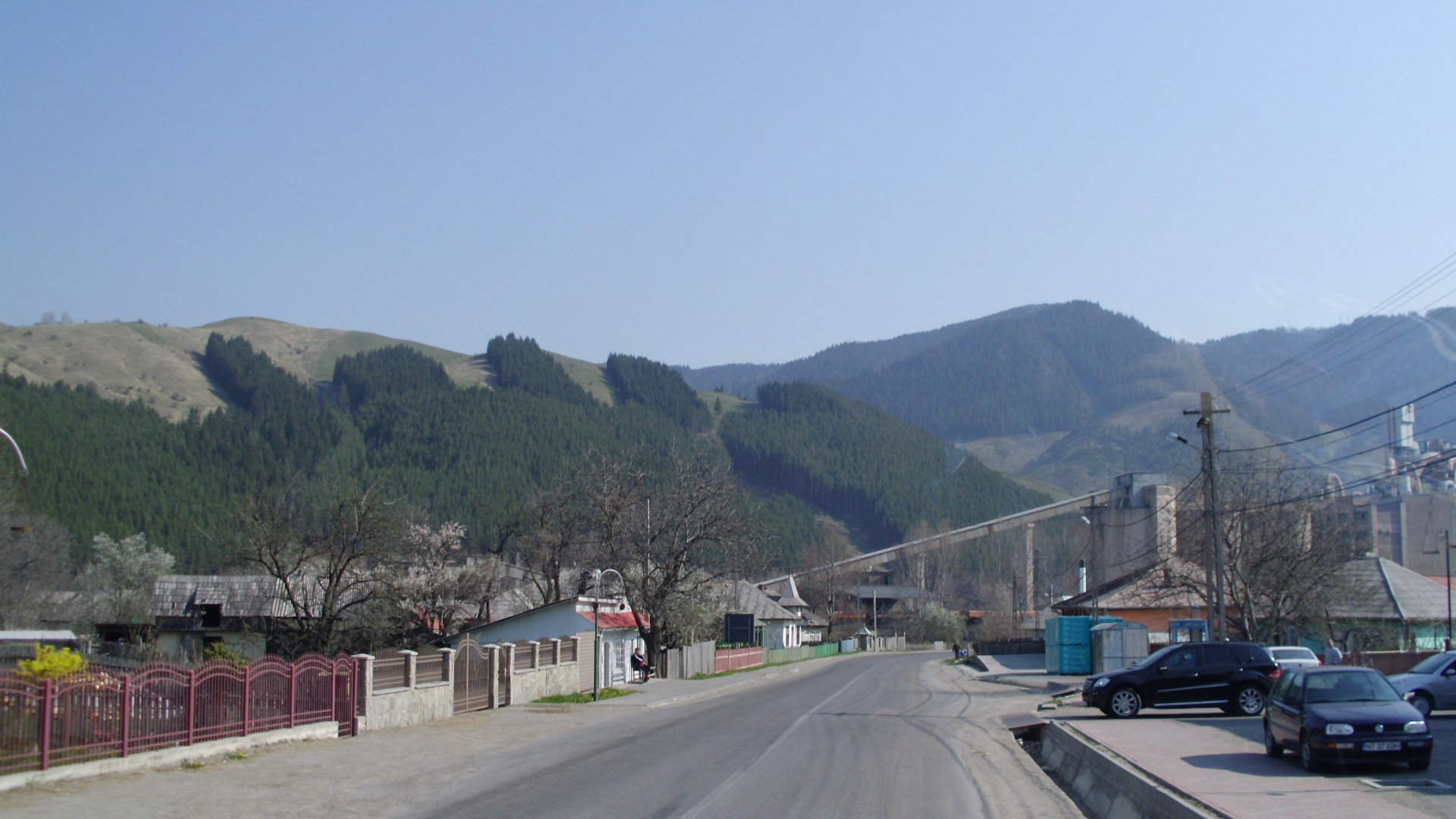

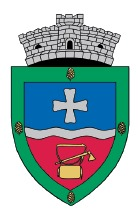
- Coat of arms

- Location in Neamț County

- Location in Romania
- Coordinates: 46°54′N 26°1′E
- Country: Romania
- County: Neamț
- Subdivisions: Tașca, Hamzoaia, Neagra, Ticoș-Floarea

Government
  - Mayor (2024–2028): Daniela Ursache (Ind.)
- Area: 95.63 km^{2} (36.92 sq mi)
- Elevation: 558 m (1,831 ft)
- Population (2021-12-01): 2,268
  - Density: 23.72/km^{2} (61.43/sq mi)
- Time zone: UTC+02:00 (EET)
  - Summer (DST): UTC+03:00 (EEST)
- Postal code: 617455
- Area code: +40 x33
- Vehicle reg.: NT
- Website: www.comunatasca.ro

Tașca is a commune in Neamț County, Western Moldavia, Romania. It is composed of four villages: Hamzoaia, Neagra, Tașca, and Ticoș-Floarea.

Historical population
Year	Pop.	±%
1992	2,750	—
2002	2,676	−2.7%
2011	2,235	−16.5%
2021	2,268	+1.5%
Source: Census data
