= Capra (Bicaz) =

Capra Pârâul Jidanului
- Location within Romania

Location
- Country: Romania
- Counties: Neamț
- Villages: Telec, Bicazu Ardelean

Physical characteristics
- Source: Hășmaș Mountains
- Mouth: Bicaz
  - coordinates: 46.8517°N 25.9313°E
- Length: 17 km (11 mi)
- Basin size: 91 km^{2} (35 sq mi)

Basin features
- Progression: Bicaz→ Bistrița→ Siret→ Danube→ Black Sea
- Tributaries
  - left: Valea Stânei, Borviz, Bistra
  - right: Danciu, Pârâul Radului, Pârâul Toșorogului, Telec

The Capra (also: Pârâul Jidanului) is a left tributary of the river Bicaz in Romania. It flows into the Bicaz in Bicazu Ardelean. Its length is 17 km (11 mi) and its basin size is 91 km^{2} (35 sq mi).
