= Bicaz-Chei =

- Commune
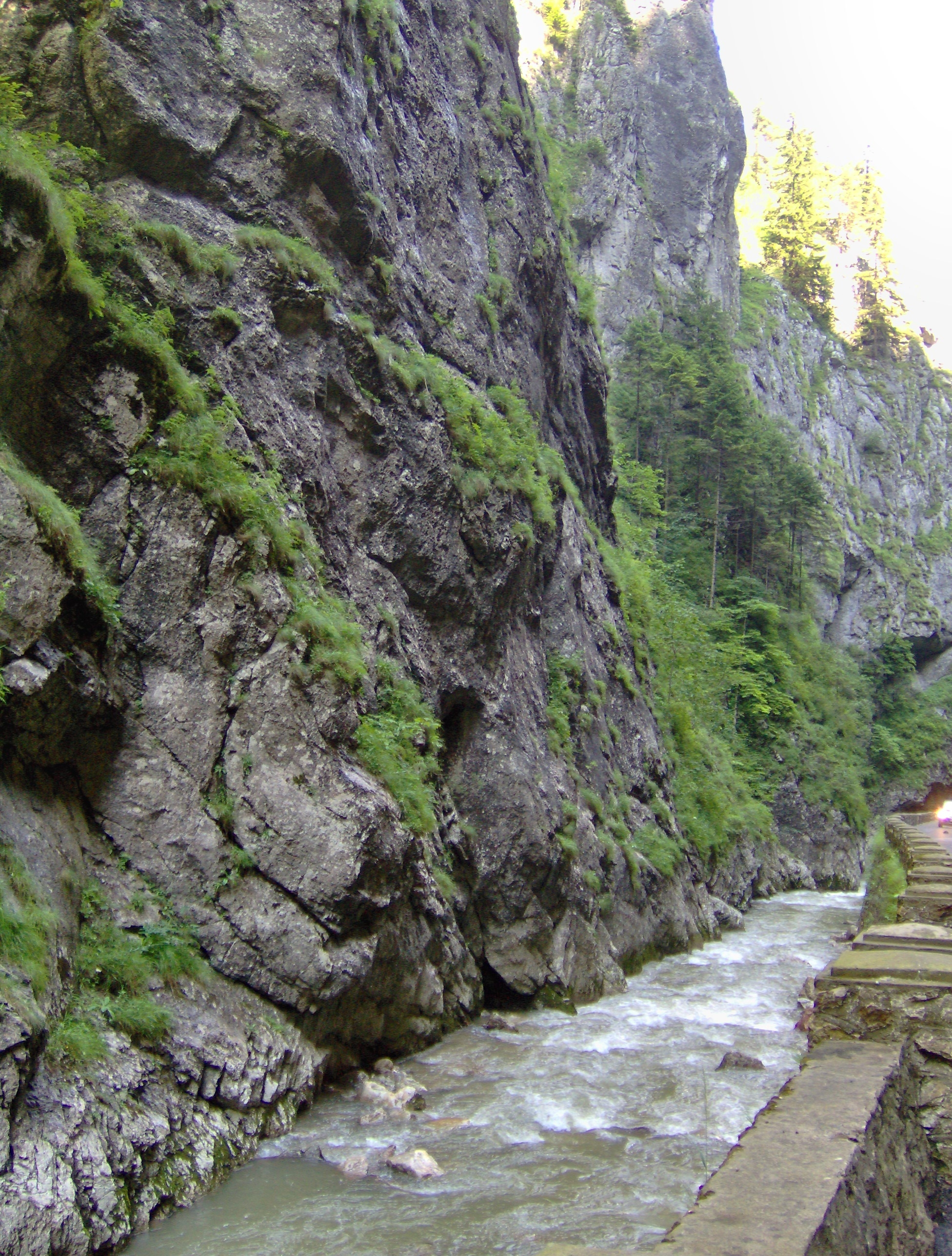
- The Bicaz Gorge in Bicaz-Chei

- Location in Neamț County

- Location in Romania
- Coordinates: 46°49′N 25°53′E
- Country: Romania
- County: Neamț

Government
  - Mayor (2024–2028): Ghiorghe Oniga (PNL)
- Area: 102.34 km^{2} (39.51 sq mi)
- Elevation: 625 m (2,051 ft)
- Population (2021-12-01): 3,862
  - Density: 37.74/km^{2} (97.74/sq mi)
- Time zone: UTC+02:00 (EET)
  - Summer (DST): UTC+03:00 (EEST)
- Postal code: 617060
- Area code: +(40) 233
- Vehicle reg.: NT
- Website: primariabicazchei.ro

Bicaz-Chei is a commune in Neamț County, Romania. It is composed of four villages: Bicaz-Chei, Bârnadu, Gherman, and Ivaneș. Bicaz-Chei is one of three communes in Neamț County (most of which is in Western Moldavia) that are part of the historic region of Transylvania.

The commune is located in the western part of the county, in the Cheile Bicazului-Hășmaș National Park, on the border with Harghita County. It is crossed by National road DN12C, which starts in Gheorgheni, Harghita County, passes by the Red Lake and through the nearby Bicaz Gorge, and then continues east to Bicaz.

Historical population
| Year | Pop. | ±% |
|---|---|---|
| 1930 | 4,059 | — |
| 1956 | 4,073 | +0.3% |
| 1977 | 4,283 | +5.2% |
| 1992 | 4,414 | +3.1% |
| 2002 | 4,665 | +5.7% |
| 2011 | 4,089 | −12.3% |
| 2021 | 3,862 | −5.6% |
Source: Census data
