= Tarcău Mountains =

Mountain range

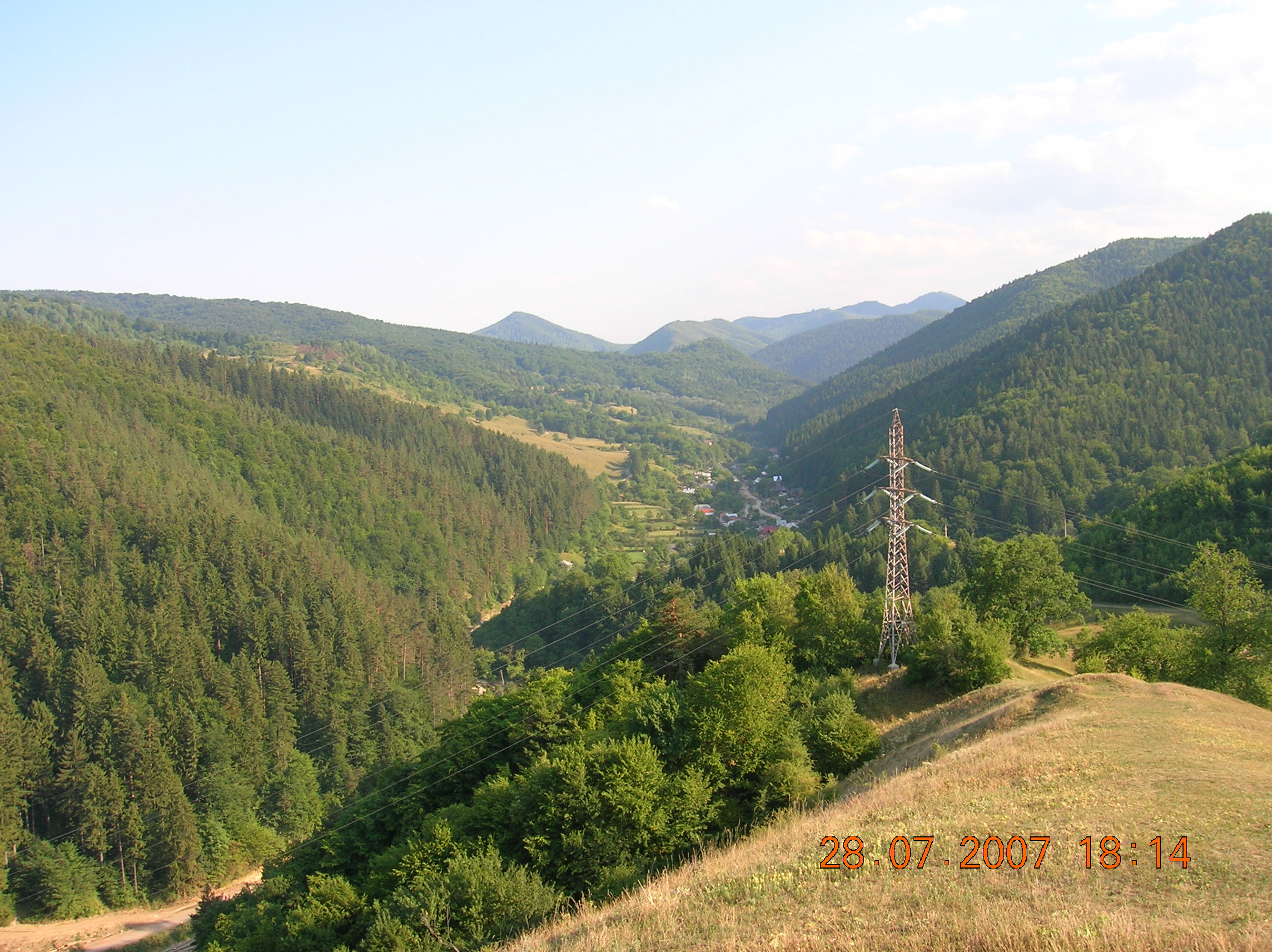
- The Tarcău Mountains. View towards the Doamna River valley

Highest point
- Peak: Grindușu Peak
- Elevation: 1,664 m (5,459 ft)

Dimensions
- Length: 65 km (40 mi)
- Width: 40 km (25 mi)
- Area: 1,810 km^{2} (700 mi^{2})

Geography
- Country: Romania
- Region: Moldavia
- Range coordinates: 46°46′N 26°16′E

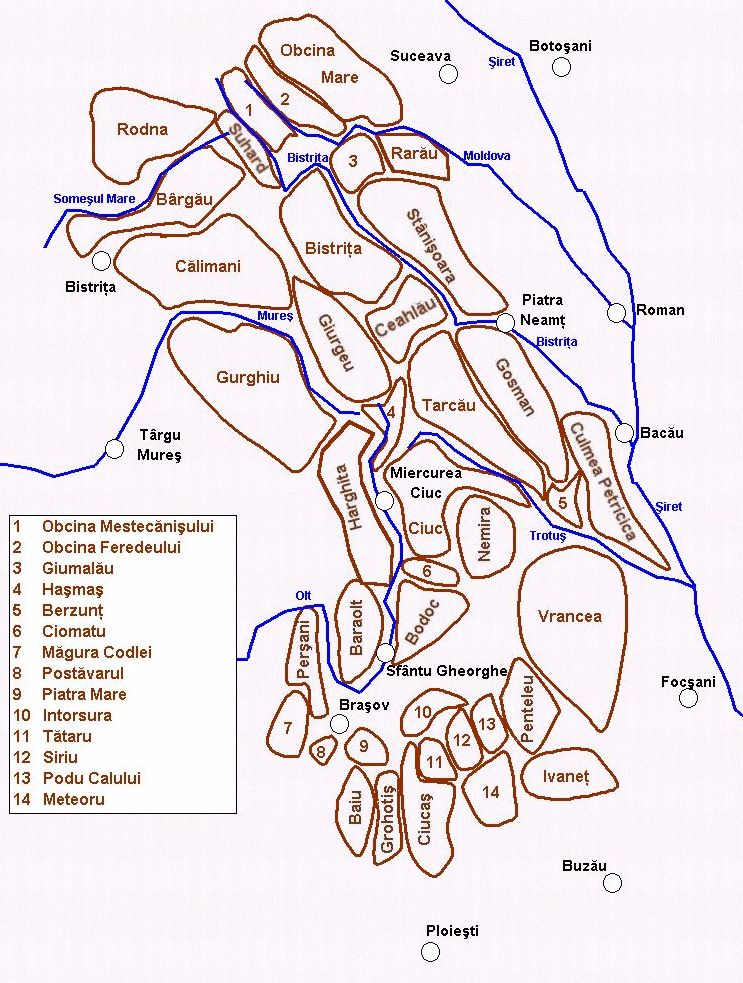
Map of the Eastern Carpathians, with the Tarcău Mountains in the center

The Tarcău Mountains (Romanian: Munții Tarcău, Hungarian: Tarkő-hegység) are a mountain range, part of the Moldavian-Muntenian Carpathians of the Outer Eastern Carpathians.

The range is located between the latitudes 46°25′ and 46°57′ N and between the longitudes 25°52′ and 26°28′ E. The range is bordered by the following rivers:

- The Bicaz and the Bistrița to the north.
- The Dămuc and Valea Rece to the west.
- The Trotuș to the south.

To the east they are limited by the subcarpathian hills along a line running approximately from Piatra Neamț to Moinești. The highest point is Grindușu Peak at 1,664 metres (5,459 feet).
