= List of Székely settlements =

Following is a list of Székely settlements. The list contains the municipalities belonging to the Székely Seats in the 19th century, before the administrative reform in Hungary. The Seats were the traditional self-governing territorial units of the Transylvanian Székelys during medieval times. (Saxons were also organised in Seats.) The Seats were not part of the traditional Hungarian county system, and their inhabitants enjoyed a higher level of freedom (especially until the 18th century) than those living in the counties.

== Aranyosszék (Aranyos Seat) ==
Name of the Székely Seat: Aranyos Administrative centre: Felvinc (Unirea, Alba)
Municipality (19th century)	In Romanian	Present county	Note
Alsószentmihály	Sinmihaiu de Jos	Cluj	today part of Mihai Viteazu
Aranyosgyéres	Câmpia Turzii	Cluj	
Aranyosmohács	Măhăceni	Alba	today part of Unirea
Borrév	Buru	Cluj	
Aranyosrákos	Vălenii de Arieș	Cluj	today part of Moldovenești
Bágyon	Bădeni	Cluj	today part of Moldovenești
Csákó	Cicău	Alba	
Csegez	Pietroasa	Cluj	
Dombró	Dumbrava	Alba	today part of Unirea
Felsőszentmihály	Mihai Viteazu*	Cluj	*Renamed in the 20th century. Earlier Romanian name: Sânmihaiu de Sus
Felvinc	Unirea	Alba	
Harasztos	Călărași	Cluj	
Inakfalva	Inoc	Alba	
Kercsed	Stejeriș	Cluj	
Kövend	Plăiești	Cluj	
Marosörményes	Ormeniș	Alba	
Marosveresmart	Veresmort	Alba	today part of Unirea
Mészkő	Cheia	Cluj	today part of Mihai Viteazu
Sinfalva	Cornești	Cluj	today part of Mihai Viteazu
Székelyföldvár	Războieni-Cetate	Alba	
Székelyhidas	Podeni	Cluj	
Székelykocsárd	Lunca Mureșului	Alba	
Torda	Turda	Cluj	although not an official Szekler settlement, its inhabitants were Szeklers
Tordaszentlászló	Săvădisla	Cluj	although not an official Szekler settlement, its inhabitants were Szeklers
Torockó	Trascău	Alba	although not an official Szekler settlement, its inhabitants were Szeklers
Torockószentgyörgy	Colțești	Alba	although not an official Szekler settlement, its inhabitants were Szeklers
Várfalva	Moldovenești*	Cluj	*Renamed in the 20th century. Earlier Romanian name: Varfalău

== Csíkszék (Csík Seat) ==
Name of the Székely Seat: Csík Administrative centre: Csíkszereda (Miercurea Ciuc)
Municipality (19th century)	In Romanian	Present county	Note
Ajnád	Nădejdea	Harghita	
Balánbánya	Bălan	Harghita	
Barackos	Barațcoș	Harghita	
Borszék	Borsec	Harghita	
Borzont	Borzont	Harghita	
Bucsintető	Bucin	Harghita	
Csatószeg	Cetățuia	Harghita	
Csíkbánkfalva	Bancu	Harghita	
Csíkcsicsó	Ciceu	Harghita	
Csíkcsomortán	Șoimeni	Harghita	
Csíkdánfalva	Dănești	Harghita	
Csíkjenőfalva	Ineu	Harghita	
Csíkmadaras	Mădăraș	Harghita	
Csíkménaság	Armășeni	Harghita	
Csíkrákos	Racu	Harghita	
Csíkpálfalva	Păuleni-Ciuc	Harghita	
Csíksomlyó	Șumuleu Ciuc	Harghita	today part of Miercurea Ciuc
Csíkszentdomokos	Sândominic	Harghita	
Csíkszentgyörgy	Ciucsângeorgiu	Harghita	
Csíkszentimre	Sântimbru	Harghita	
Csíkszentkirály	Sâncrăieni	Harghita	
Csíkszentlélek	Leliceni	Harghita	
Csíkszentmiklós	Nicolești	Harghita	
Csíkszentsimon	Sânsimion	Harghita	
Csíkszenttamás	Tomești	Harghita	
Csíkszereda	Miercurea Ciuc	Harghita	
Csíktapolca	Toplița Ciuc	Harghita	today part of Miercurea Ciuc
Csíkverebes	Vrabia	Harghita	
Csobános	Ciobăniș	Harghita	
Ditró	Ditrău	Harghita	
Farkaspalló	Puntea Lupului	Harghita	
Galócás	Gălăutaș	Harghita	
Gödemesterháza	Stânceni	Mureș	
Gyergyóalfalu	Joseni	Harghita	
Gyergyóbékás	Bicazu Ardelean	Neamț	
Gyergyódomokos	Dămuc	Neamț	
Gyergyóholló	Corbu	Harghita	
Gyergyóremete	Remetea	Harghita	
Gyergyószentmiklós	Gheorgheni	Harghita	
Gyergyótölgyes	Tulghieș	Harghita	
Gyergyóvárhegy	Subcetate	Harghita	
Gyilkostó	Lacu Roșu	Harghita	
Gyimesbükk	Ghimeș-Făget	Bacău*	*Since 1951
Gyimesfelsőlok	Lunca de Sus	Harghita	
Gyimesközéplok	Lunca de Jos	Harghita	
Hargitafürdő	Harghita Băi	Harghita	
Hágótő	Hagota	Harghita	
Hidegség	Harghita-Băi	Harghita	
Hosszúrez	Huisurez	Neamț	
Hosszúaszó	Hosasău	Harghita	
Karcfalva	Cârța	Harghita	
Kászonaltíz	Plăieșii de Jos	Harghita	
Kászonfeltíz	Plăieșii de Sus	Harghita	
Kászonimpér	Imper	Harghita	
Kilyénfalva	Chileni	Harghita	
Kóstelek	Coșnea	Bacău	
Kotormány	Cotormani	Harghita	
Lázárfalva	Lăzărești	Harghita	
Lóvész	Livezi	Harghita	
Madéfalva	Siculeni	Harghita	
Madarasi Hargita	Mădăraș	Harghita	
Magyarcsügés	Cădărești	Bacău	
Marosfő	Izvoru Mureșului	Harghita	
Maroshévíz	Toplița	Harghita	
Pottyond	Potiond	Harghita	
Palotailva	Lunca Bradului	Harghita	
Péntekpataka	Pintic	Harghita	
Salamás	Sărmaș	Harghita	
Szárhegy	Lăzarea	Harghita	
Szépvíz	Frumoasa	Harghita	
Szentimrei Büdösfürdő	Sântimbru Băi	Harghita	
Tekerőpatak	Valea Strâmbă	Harghita	
Táska	Tașca	Neamț	
Tusnád	Tușnad	Harghita	
Tusnádfürdő	Băile Tușnad	Harghita	
Úzvölgye	Valea Uzului	Harghita	
Vasláb	Voșlăbeni	Harghita	

== Háromszék (Three Seats) ==
Name of the Székely Seat: Háromszék (=Three Seats) Administrative centre: Sepsiszentgyörgy (Sfântu Gheorghe)
Municipality (19th century)	In Romanian	Present county	Note
Albis	Albiș	Covasna	
Angyalos	Angheluș	Covasna	
Aldoboly	Dobolii de Jos	Covasna	
Alsócsernáton	Cernatu de Jos	Covasna	
Apáca	Apata	Brașov	
Angyalos	Angheluș	Covasna	
Árapatak	Araci	Covasna	
Árkos	Arcuș	Covasna	
Barátos	Brateș	Covasna	
Bereck	Brețcu	Covasna	
Bácstelek	Băcel	Covasna	
Bálványos	Bálványos	Covasna	
Bikkfalva	Bicfalău	Covasna	
Bodola	Budila	Brașov	
Bodvaly		Covasna	
Bodzaforduló	Întorsura Buzăului	Covasna	
Bodzavám	Vama Buzăului	Brașov	
Bölön	Belin	Covasna	
Bölönpatak	Belin Vale	Covasna	
Bükszád	Bicsad	Covasna	
Csomakőrös	Chiuruș	Covasna	
Csomortán		Covasna	
Dálnok	Dalnic	Covasna	
Döblön	Dălghiu	Brașov	
Egerpatak	Aninoasa	Covasna	
Előpatak	Vâlcele	Covasna	
Erősd	Ariusd	Covasna	
Eresztevény	Eresteghiu	Covasna	today part of Moacșa
Erdőfüle	Filia	Covasna	
Esztelnek	Estelnic	Covasna	
Felsőcsernáton	Cernatu de Sus	Covasna	
Felsőrákos	Racoșul de Sus	Covasna	
Fotos	Fotos	Covasna	
Futásfalva		Covasna	
Gidófalva	Ghidfalau	Covasna	
Gelence	Ghelința	Covasna	
Hilib	Hilib	Covasna	
Hídvég	Haghig	Covasna	
Haraly	Harale	Covasna	
Ikafalva		Covasna	today part of Cernat
Illyefalva	Ilieni	Covasna	
Katrosa	Catroșa	Covasna	
Kálnok	Calnic	Covasna	
Keresztvár	Teliu	Brașov	
Kézdikővár	Petriceni	Covasna	
Kézdialmás	Mereni	Covasna	
Kézdimartonos	Mărtănuș	Covasna	
Kézdioroszfalu	Ruseni	Covasna	today part of Târgu Secuiesc
Kézdiszászfalu	Săsăuși	Covasna	today part of Târgu Secuiesc
Kézdiszentlélek	Sânzieni	Covasna	
Kézdivásárhely	Târgu Secuiesc	Covasna	
Kilyén	Chilieni	Covasna	
Kisbacon	Bățanii Mici	Covasna	
Kisborosnyó	Boroșneu Mic	Covasna	
Komandó	Comandău	Covasna	today part of Reci
Komolló	Comolău	Covasna	today part of Reci
Kovászna	Covasna	Covasna	
Kökös	Chichiș	Covasna	
Köpec	Căpeni	Covasna	
Középajta	Aita Medie	Covasna	
Kraszna	Crasna	Covasna	
Krizba	Crizbav	Brașov	
Kurtapatak	Valea Scurtă	Covasna	
Lemhény	Lemnia	Covasna	
Lécfalva	Let	Covasna	
Lisznyó	Lisnău	Covasna	
Lisznyópatak	Lisnău Vale	Covasna	
Lüget	Arini	Brașov	
Maksa	Moacșa	Covasna	
Magyarhermány	Herculian	Covasna	
Martonos	Martanus	Covasna	
Málnás	Malnaș	Covasna	
Málnásfürdő	Malnaș-Băi	Covasna	
Mikóújfalu	Micfalău	Covasna	
Márkos	Mărcuș	Covasna	
Márkosfalva	Marcusa	Covasna	
Márkosrét	Lunca Marcusului	Covasna	
Miklósvár	Micloșoara	Covasna	
Nagyajta	Aita Mare	Covasna	
Nagybacon	Bățanii Mari	Covasna	
Nagyborosnyó	Boroșneu Mare	Covasna	
Négyfalu	Săcele	Brașov	composed of Hosszúfalu, Csernátfalu, Türkös and Bácsfalu, known also a Csángó settlements
Nyújtód	Lunga	Covasna	
Ojtoz	Oituz	Covasna	
Oltszem	Olteni	Covasna	
Orbaitelek	Telechia	Covasna	
Ozsdola	Ojdula	Covasna	
Páké	Pachia	Covasna	
Petőfalva	Peteni	Covasna	
Páva	Pava	Covasna	today part of Zabola
Pürkerec	Purcăreni	Brașov	known also as a Csángó settlement
Sepsibesenyő	Pădureni	Covasna	
Sepsibodok	Bodoc	Covasna	
Sepsiköröspatak	Valea Crișului	Covasna	
Sepsiszentgyörgy	Sfântu Gheorghe	Covasna	
Sepsiszentkirály	Sâncrai	Covasna	
Sepsimogyorós	Magherus	Covasna	
Sósmező	Poiana Sărată	Bacău	
Sugásfürdő	Baile Sugas	Covasna	
Szacsva	Saciova	Covasna	
Szalomér	part of Sancrai	Covasna	
Szárazajta	Aita Seacă	Covasna	
Száldobos	Doboșeni	Covasna	
Szárazpatak	Valea Seacă	Covasna	
Szentkatolna	Cătălina	Covasna	
Szentlélek	Sânzieni	Covasna	
Tatrang	Tărlungeni	Brașov	known also as a Csángó settlement
Tálpatak	Scrădoasa	Covasna	
Torja	Turia	Covasna	composed of Altorja, Feltorja, Karatna and Volál
Uzon	Ozun	Covasna	
Uzonfüzes	Lunca Ozunului	Covasna	
Uzonkafürdő	Ozunca	Covasna	
Újkászon	Cașinu Nou	Covasna	
Ürmös	Ormeniș	Brașov	
Várhegy	Cetățuia	Covasna	
Vámoshíd	Podu Olt	Brașov	
Virágosvölgy	Floroaia	Covasna	
Zabola	Zăbala	Covasna	
Zágon	Zagon	Covasna	
Zágonbárkány	Barcani	Covasna	
Zabrató	Zăbrătău	Covasna	
Zajzon	Zizin	Brașov	known also as a Csángó settlement
Zalán	Zălan	Covasna	
Zalánpatak	Valea Zălanului	Covasna	

== Marosszék (Maros Seat) ==
Name of the Székely Seat: Maros Administrative centre: Marosvásárhely (Târgu-Mureș)
Municipality (19th century)	In Romanian	Present county	Note
Ákosfalva	Acățari	Mureș	
Backamadaras	Păsăreni	Mureș	
Berekeresztúr	Bâra	Mureș	
Búzaháza	Griușorul	Mureș	
Csókfalva	Cioc	Mureș	today part of Trei Sate
Csiba	Ciba	Alba	
Csíkfalva	Vărgata	Mureș	
Demiháza	Damieni	Mureș	
Fintaháza	Cinta	Mureș	
Folyfalva	Foi	Mureș	
Geges	Ghinești	Mureș	
Gernyeszeg	Gornești	Mureș	
Jobbágyfalva	Valea	Mureș	
Jobbágytelke	Sâmbriaș	Mureș	
Harasztkerék	Roteni	Mureș	
Havad	Neaua	Mureș	
Havadtő	Viforoasa	Mureș	
Illyésmező	Ilieși	Mureș	
Káposztásszentmiklós	Nicolești	Mureș	
Kebele	Sânișor	Mureș	
Kebeleszentivány	Ivănești	Mureș	
Kelementelke	Călimănești	Mureș	
Kibéd	Chibed	Mureș	
Kisgörgény	Gruișor	Mureș	
Kislekence	Lechincioara	Mureș	
Koronka	Corunca	Mureș	
Köszvényes		Mureș	
Lukafalva	Gheorghe Doja, Mureș*	Mureș	*Renamed in the 20th century. Earlier Romanian name: Lucafalău
Lukailencfalva	Ilieni	Mureș	today part of Gheorghe Doja
Makfalva	Ghindari	Mureș	
Malomfalva	Morești	Mureș	
Marosvásárhely	Târgu Mureș	Mureș	*medieval Hungarian name: Székelyvásárhely
Marosvécs	Brâncovenești	Mureș	
Meggyesfalva	Mureșeni	Mureș	
Mezőbergenye	Berghia	Mureș	
Mezőcsávás	Ceuașu de Câmpie	Mureș	
Mezőfele	Câmpenița	Mureș	
Mezőkölpény	Culpiu	Mureș	
Mezőmadaras	Mădăraș	Mureș	
Mezőménes	Herghelia	Mureș	
Mezőpanit	Pănet	Mureș	
Mezűrücs	Râciu	Mureș	
Mezősámsond	Gheorghe Șincai*	Mureș	*Renamed in the 20th century. Earlier Romanian name: Șamșud
Mezőszabad	Voiniceni	Mureș	
Mikháza	Călugăreni	Mureș	
Nagyernye	Ernei	Mureș	
Nyárádgálfalva	Gălești	Mureș	
Nyárádmagyarós	Măgherani	Mureș	
Nyárádremete	Eremitu	Mureș	
Nyárádselye	Șilea Nirajului	Mureș	
Nyárádszentbenedek	Murgești	Mureș	
Nyárádszereda	Miercurea Nirajului	Mureș	
Nyárádtő	Ungheni	Mureș	
Nyárádszentmárton	Sanmartin	Mureș	
Nyárádszentlászló	Savadisla	Mureș	
Nyomát	Niomatu	Mureș	
Rigmány	Rigmani	Mureș	
Sáromberke		Mureș	
Sóvárad	Sărățeni	Mureș	
Szabéd	Săbed	Mureș	
Székelyabod	Abud	Mureș	
Székelybere	Bereni	Mureș	
Székelyhodos	Hodoșa	Mureș	
Székelykál		Mureș	
Székelymoson	Moșun	Mureș	
Székelylengyelfalva	Polonița	Mureș	
Székelyszentistván	Stefănești	Mureș	today part of Trei Sate
Székelyvaja	Vălenii	Mureș	
Szentgerice	Gălățeni	Mureș	
Szentháromság	Troița	Mureș	
Szováta	Sovata	Mureș	
Tompa	Tâmpa	Mureș	
Üvegcsűr	Glăjărie	Mureș	
Vadad	Vadu	Mureș	
Vármező	Câmpu Cetății	Mureș	

== Udvarhelyszék (Udvarhely Seat) ==
Name of the Székely Seat: Udvarhely Administrative centre: Székelyudvarhely (Odorheiu Secuiesc)
Municipality (19th century)	In Romanian	Present county	Note
Agyagfalva	Lutița	Harghita	
Alsóboldogfalva	Bodogaia	Harghita	
Alsórákos	Racos	Braşov	
Atyha	Atia	Harghita	
Bágy	Bădeni	Harghita	
Bözödújfalu	Bezidu Nou	Mureș	not inhabited since the Ceaușescu era
Énlaka	Inlăceni	Harghita	
Erdőfüle	Filia	Covasna	
Etéd	Atid	Harghita	
Farkaslaka	Lupeni	Harghita	
Felsőboldogfalva	Feliceni	Harghita	
Fenyéd	Brădești	Harghita	
Firtosmartonos	Firtănuș	Harghita	
Firtosváralja	Firtușu	Harghita	
Gagy	Goagiu	Harghita	
Homoródalmás	Merești	Harghita	
Homoródjánosfalva	Ionești	Brașov	
Homoródkarácsonyfalva	Craciunesti	Hargita	
Homoródszentpál	Sânpaul	Hargita	
Homoródújfalu	Satu Nou	Harghita	
Kadicsfalva	Cădișeni	Harghita	today part of Odorheiu Secuiesc
Kápolnásfalu	Căpâlnița	Harghita	
Kénos	Chinusu	Harghita	
Korond	Corund	Harghita	
Kőrispatak	Crișeni	Harghita	
Küküllőkeményfalva	Târnovița	Harghita	
Küsmöd	Cușmed	Harghita	
Medesér	Medișoru Mare	Harghita	
Olasztelek	Tălișoara	Covasna	
Olthévíz	Hoghiz	Brașov	
Oklánd	Ocland	Hargita	
Oroszhegy	Dealu	Harghita	
Parajd	Praid	Harghita	
Recsenyéd	Rareș	Harghita	
Rugonfalva	Ruganesti	Harghita	
Siklód	Șiclod	Harghita	
Síkaszómezeje	Şicasău	Harghita	
Sükő	Cireșeni	Harghita	
Székelybetlenfalva	Beclean	Harghita	today part of Odorheiu Secuiesc
Székelydálya	Daia	Harghita	
Székelyderzs	Darjiu	Harghita	
Székelyfancsal	Fincel	Harghita	
Székelykeresztúr	Cristuru Secuiesc	Harghita	
Székelypálfalva	Păuleni	Harghita	
Székelyszentkirály	Sâncrai	Harghita	
Székelyszentmiklós	Nicoleni	Harghita	
Székelyszenttamás	Tămașu	Harghita	
Székelyudvarhely	Odorheiu Secuiesc	Harghita	
Székelyzsombor	Jimbor	Brașov	
Szentegyházasfalu	Vlăhița	Harghita	
Szentlélek	Bisericani	Harghita	
Tarcsafalva	Tărcești	Harghita	
Tibód	Tibod	Harghita	
Újszékely	Secuieni	Harghita	
Ülke	Ulcani	Harghita	
Vargyas	Vârghiș	Covasna	
Varság	Varsag	Harghita	
Zetelaka	Zetea	Harghita	
Zeteváralja	Subcetate	Harghita	
