= Ghinești =

Ghinești may refer to several villages in Romania:

- Ghinești, a village in Sălcioara Commune, Dâmbovița County
- Ghinești, a village in Neaua Commune, Mureș County
