= Sântimbru =

Sântimbru or Sîntimbru (in old grammar) may refer to several places:

- Sântimbru, Alba, a commune in Alba County
- Sântimbru, Harghita, a commune in Harghita County
