= Gheorghe Doja (disambiguation) =

Gheorghe Doja may refer to:

- the Romanian name of György Dózsa, a Székely peasant leader
- Gheorghe Doja, Ialomița, a commune in Ialomiţa County, Romania
- Gheorghe Doja, Mureș, a commune in Mureș County, Romania
- Gheorghe Doja, a village in Răcăciuni Commune, Bacău County, Romania
