= Subcetate (disambiguation) =

Subcetate is a commune in Harghita County, Romania.

Subcetate or Sub Cetate may also refer to several other places in Romania:

- Sub Cetate, a village in Zetea Commune, Harghita County
- Subcetate, a village in Sântămăria-Orlea Commune, Hunedoara County
- Sub Cetate, a village in Valcău de Jos Commune, Sălaj County
- Subcetate, a neighborhood of the city of Oradea, Bihor County
