= Ștefan Texe =

Romanian ice hockey player

Personal information
- Nationality: Romanian
- Born: 29 June 1947 (age 77); Mădăraș, Harghita County, Romania

Sport
- Sport: Ice hockey

Ștefan Texe (born 29 June 1947) is a Romanian ice hockey player. He competed in the men's tournament at the 1968 Winter Olympics.
