= Șicasău =

- Location within Romania

Location
- Country: Romania
- Counties: Harghita County
- Villages: Liban, Șicasău

Physical characteristics
- Mouth: Târnava Mare
  - location: Lake Zetea
  - coordinates: 46.473°N 25.414°E
- Length: 20 km (12 mi)
- Basin size: 155 km^{2} (60 sq mi)

Basin features
- Progression: Târnava Mare→ Târnava→ Mureș→ Tisza→ Danube→ Black Sea
- Tributaries
  - left: Fagu Roșu, Sălămaș
  - right: Soboșa, Botul

The Șicasău is a left tributary of the river Târnava Mare in Romania. It discharges into the Zetea Reservoir (also: Lake Poiana Târnavei), which is drained by the Târnava Mare. Its length is 20 km (12 mi) and its basin size is 155 km^{2} (60 sq mi).
