= Secuieni, Harghita =

Secuieni Újszékely
- Commune
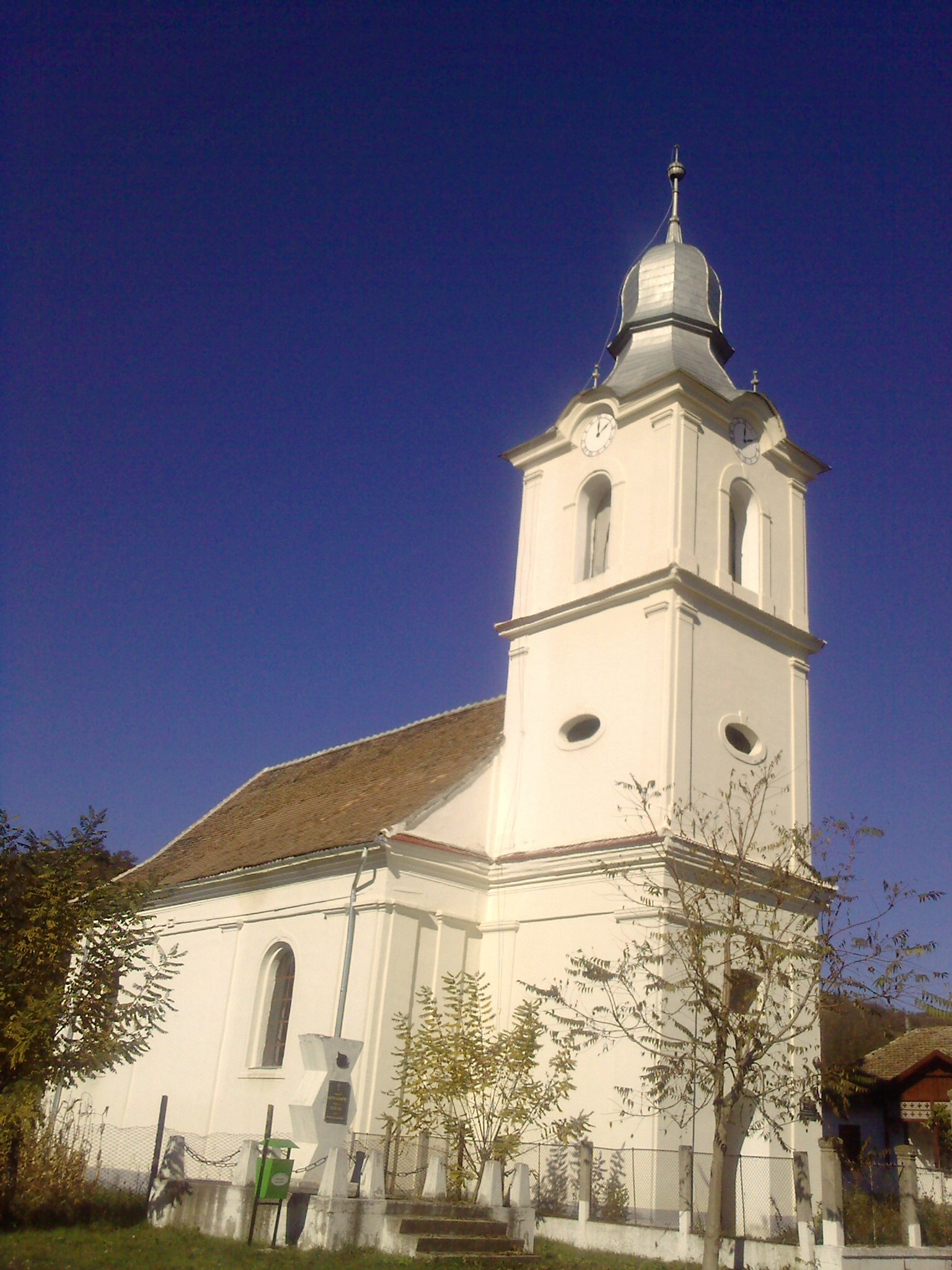
- Reformed Church in Secuieni

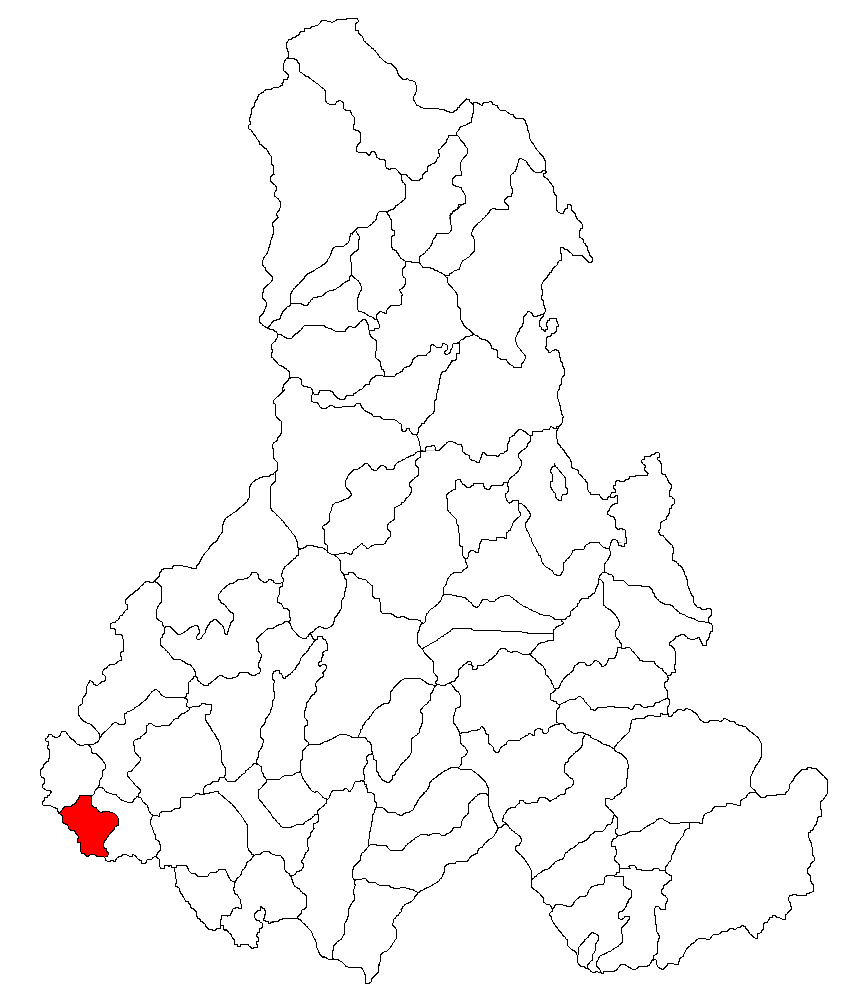
- Location in Harghita County

- Location in Romania
- Coordinates: 46°15′0″N 24°58′6″E
- Country: Romania
- County: Harghita

Government
  - Mayor (2020–2024): Zoltán Balló (UDMR)
- Area: 40.42 km^{2} (15.61 sq mi)
- Population (2021-12-01): 2,707
  - Density: 66.97/km^{2} (173.5/sq mi)
- Time zone: UTC+02:00 (EET)
  - Summer (DST): UTC+03:00 (EEST)
- Postal code: 537290
- Area code: +40 266
- Vehicle reg.: HR

Secuieni (Hungarian: Újszékely, Hungarian pronunciation: [ˈuːjseːkɛj]) is a commune in Harghita County, Romania. It lies in the Székely Land, an ethno-cultural region in eastern Transylvania.

== Component villages ==
The commune is composed of three villages:

In Romanian	In Hungarian
Bodogaia	Alsóboldogfalva
Eliseni	Székelyszenterzsébet
Secuieni	Újszékely

== History ==
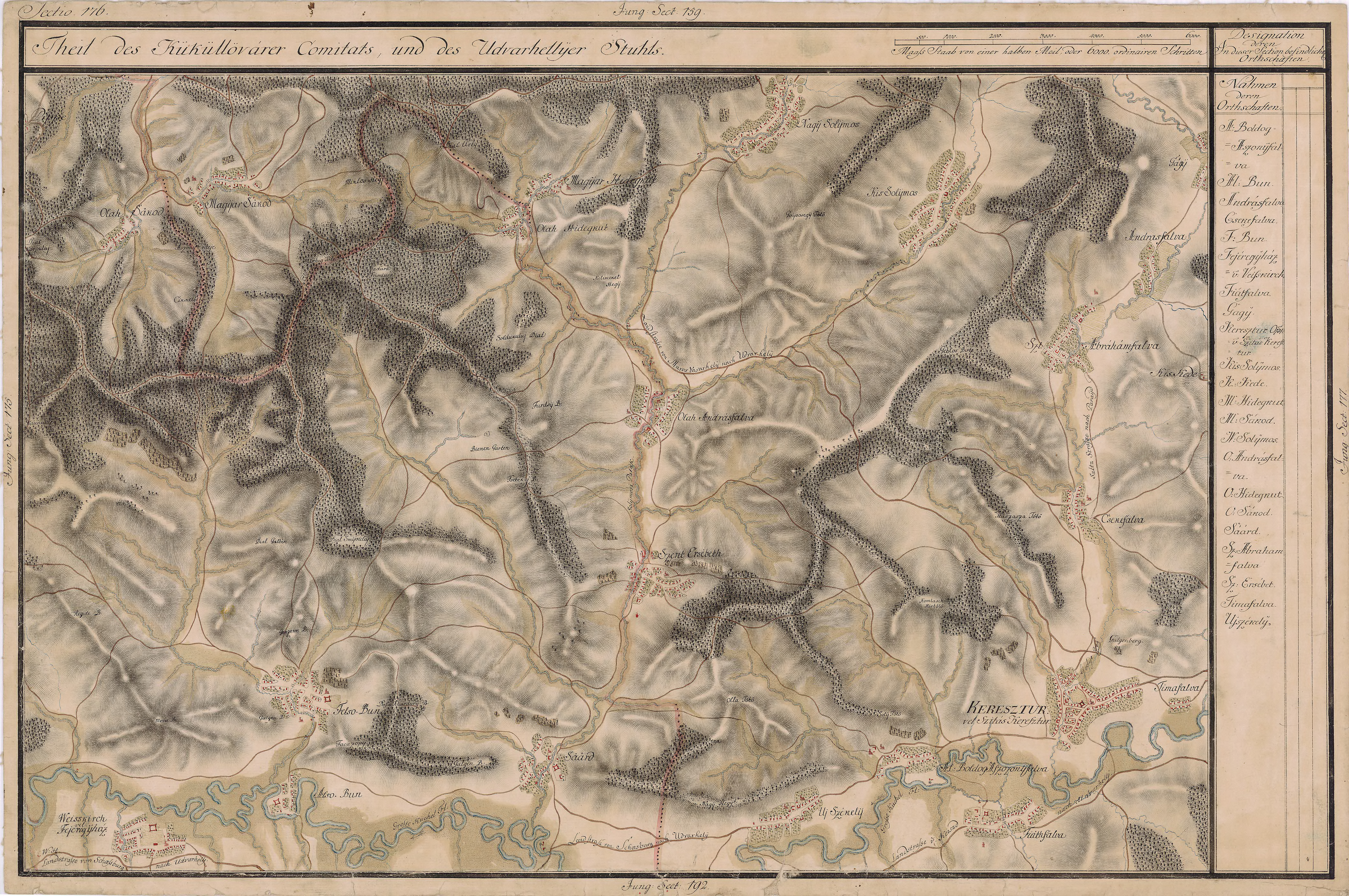
The villages on 18th century Josephinische Landaufnahme

The villages were part of the Székely Land region of the historical Transylvania province. They belonged to Udvarhelyszék district until the administrative reform of Transylvania in 1876, when they fell within the Udvarhely County in the Kingdom of Hungary. After the Treaty of Trianon of 1920, they became part of Romania and fell within Odorhei County during the interwar period. In 1940, the second Vienna Award granted the Northern Transylvania to Hungary and the villages were held by Hungary until 1944. After Soviet occupation, the Romanian administration returned and the commune became officially part of Romania in 1947. Between 1952 and 1960, the commune fell within the Magyar Autonomous Region, between 1960 and 1968 the Mureș-Magyar Autonomous Region.

In 1968, the province was abolished, and since then, the commune has been part of Harghita County.

== Demographics ==
The commune has an absolute Székely Hungarian majority. According to the 2002 census it has a population of 2,660 of which 93.57% or 2,489 are ethnic Hungarian.
