= Cernat, Covasna =

Cernat Csernáton
- Commune
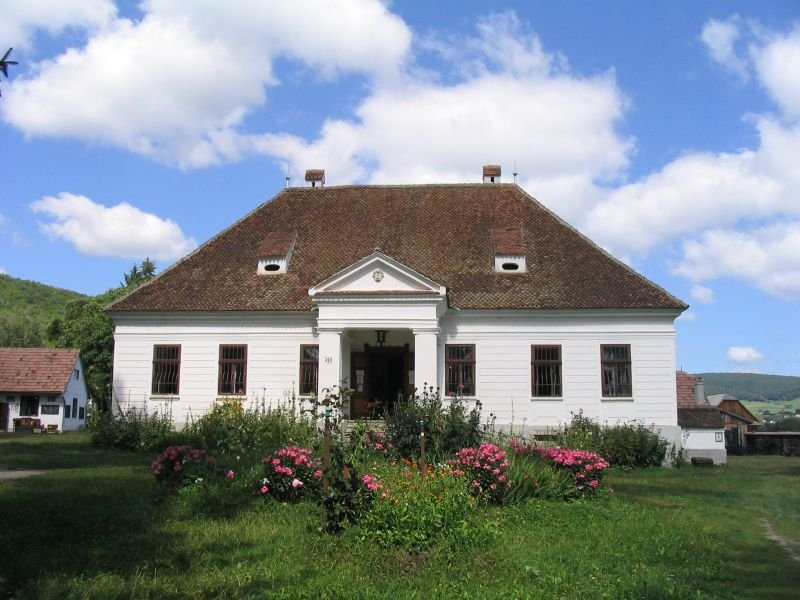
- The Damokos mansion-house, now Village Museum

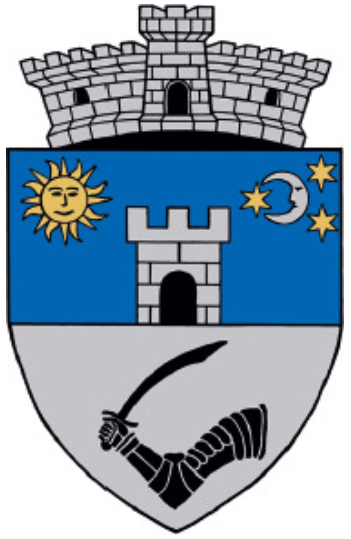
- Coat of arms

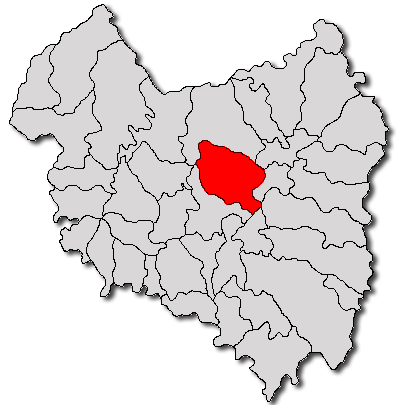
- Location in Covasna County

- Location in Romania
- Coordinates: 45°57′N 26°2′E
- Country: Romania
- County: Covasna

Government
  - Mayor (2020–2024): Árpád Rákosi (Ind.)
- Area: 129 km^{2} (50 sq mi)
- Elevation: 563 m (1,847 ft)
- Population (2021-12-01): 3,936
  - Density: 30.5/km^{2} (79.0/sq mi)
- Time zone: UTC+02:00 (EET)
  - Summer (DST): UTC+03:00 (EEST)
- Postal code: 527065
- Area code: (+40) 02 67
- Vehicle reg.: CV
- Website: www.csernaton.ro

Cernat (Hungarian: Csernáton; Hungarian pronunciation: [ˈtʃɛrnaːton]) is a commune in Covasna County, Transylvania, Romania composed of three villages: Albiș (Kézdialbis), Cernat, and Icafalău (Ikafalva).

It formed part of Háromszék district of the Székely Land region in historical Transylvania. Cernat village was formed with the merger of two villages, Cernatu de Jos (Alsócsernáton) and Cernatu de Sus (Felsőcsernáton).

== Demographics ==
The commune has an absolute Székely Hungarian majority. According to the 2011 census, Cernat had a population of 3,956, of which 98.51% or 3,897 were Székely Hungarians. At the 2021 census, the commune had a population of 3,936.
