= Ceuașu de Câmpie =

Ceuașu de Câmpie Mezőcsávás
- Commune
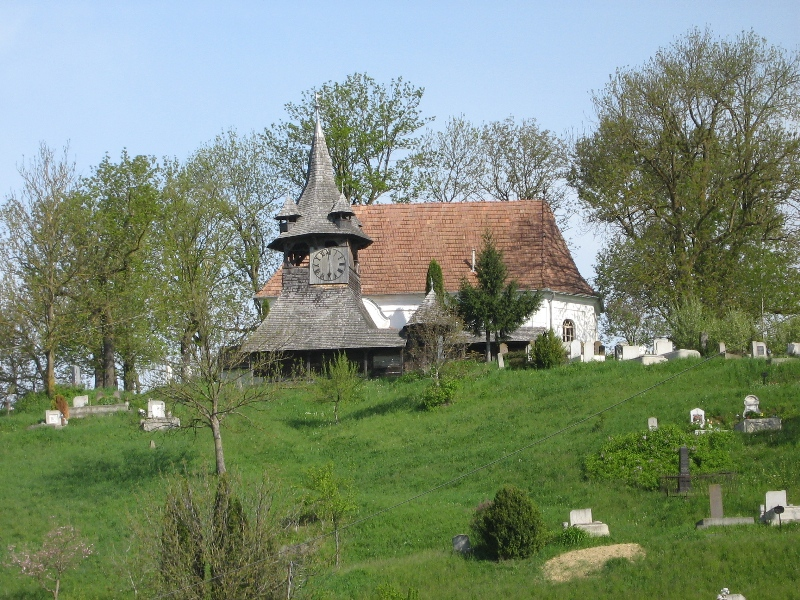
- Reformed church in Ceuașu de Câmpie

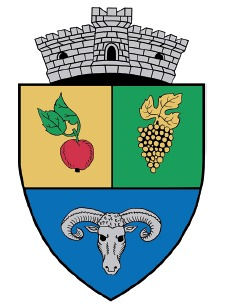
- Coat of arms

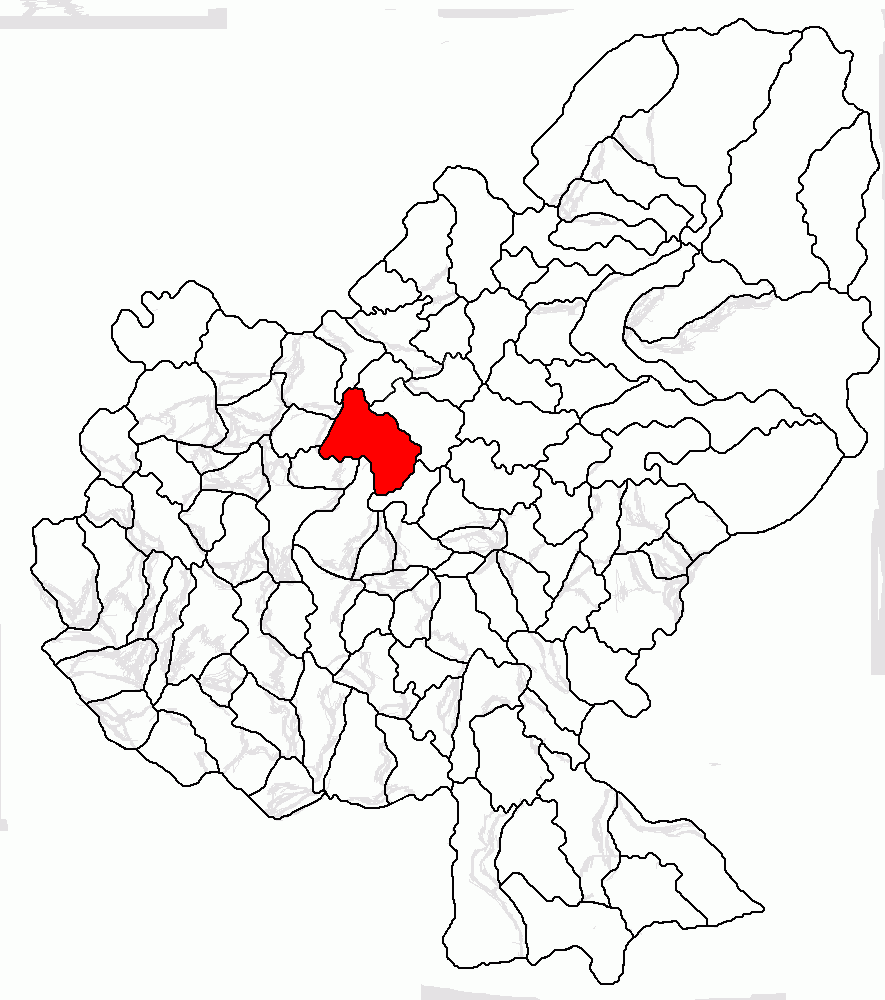
- Location in Mureș County

- Location in Romania
- Coordinates: 46°29′N 24°38′E
- Country: Romania
- County: Mureș

Government
  - Mayor (2020–2024): József Levente Szabó (UDMR)
- Area: 83.38 km^{2} (32.19 sq mi)
- Elevation: 375 m (1,230 ft)
- Population (2021-12-01): 5,992
  - Density: 71.86/km^{2} (186.1/sq mi)
- Time zone: UTC+02:00 (EET)
  - Summer (DST): UTC+03:00 (EEST)
- Postal code: 547140
- Area code: (+40) 0265
- Vehicle reg.: MS
- Website: www.ceuasudecampie.ro

Ceuașu de Câmpie (Hungarian: Mezőcsávás [ˈmɛzøːt͡ʃaːvaːʃ]) is a commune in Mureș County, Transylvania, Romania composed of eight villages: Bozed (Bazéd), Câmpenița (Mezőfele), Ceuașu de Câmpie, Culpiu (Mezőkölpény), Herghelia (Mezőménes), Porumbeni (Galambod), Săbed (Szabéd), and Voiniceni (Mezőszabad).

== Demographics ==
According to the 2002 census, the commune had a population of 5,419, of which 49.36% or 2,675 were Székely Hungarian, and 2,222 or 41% were Romanians. At the 2021 census, the commune had a population of 5,992; of those, 38.68% were Romanians, 38.25% Hungarians, and 11.57% Roma.

== See also ==
- List of Hungarian exonyms (Mureș County)
