= Crăciunești =

Crăciunești Nyárádkarácson
- Commune
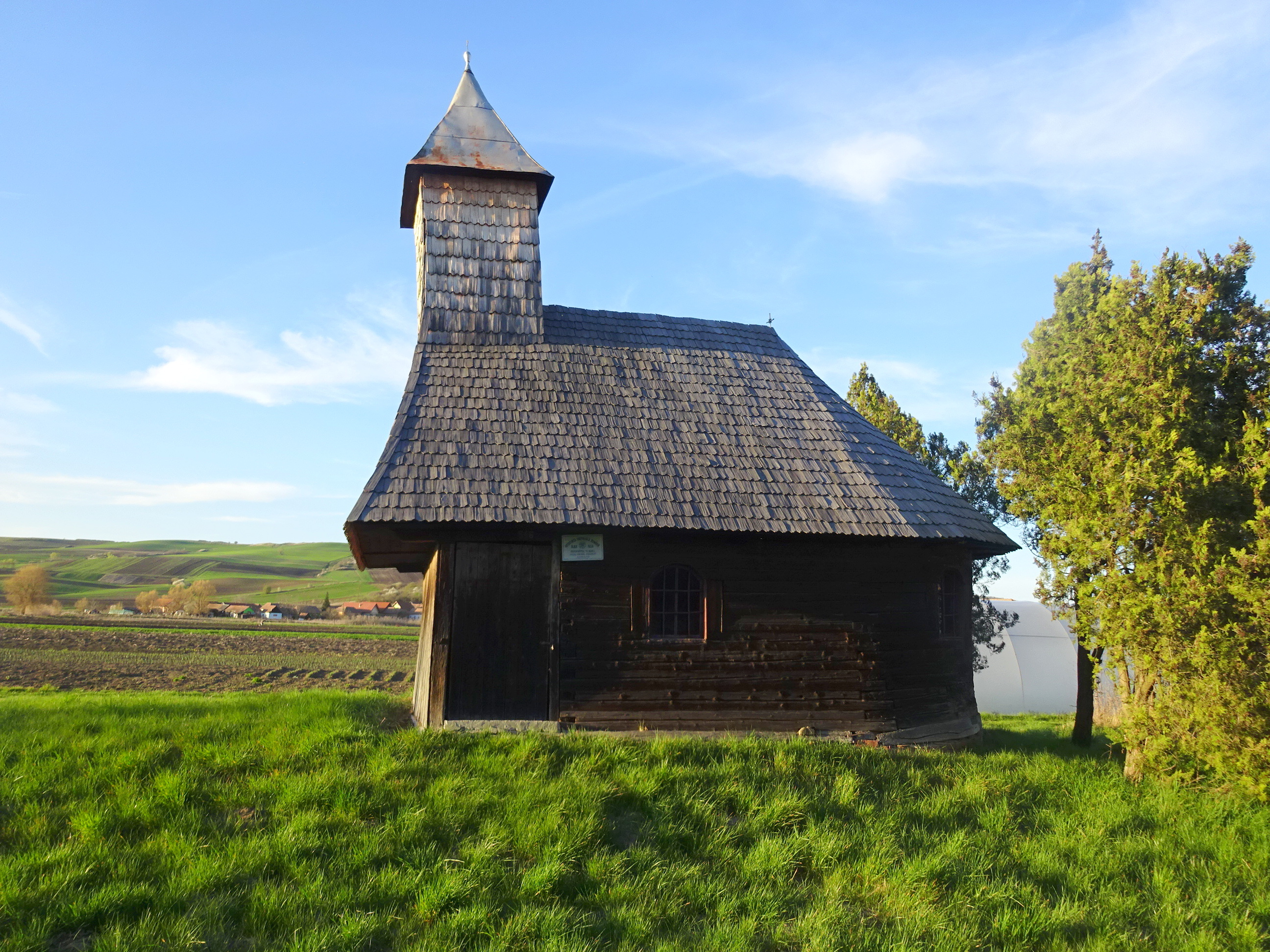
- Wooden church in Nicolești

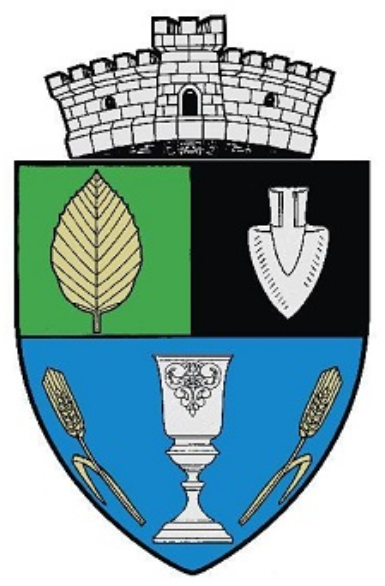
- Coat of arms

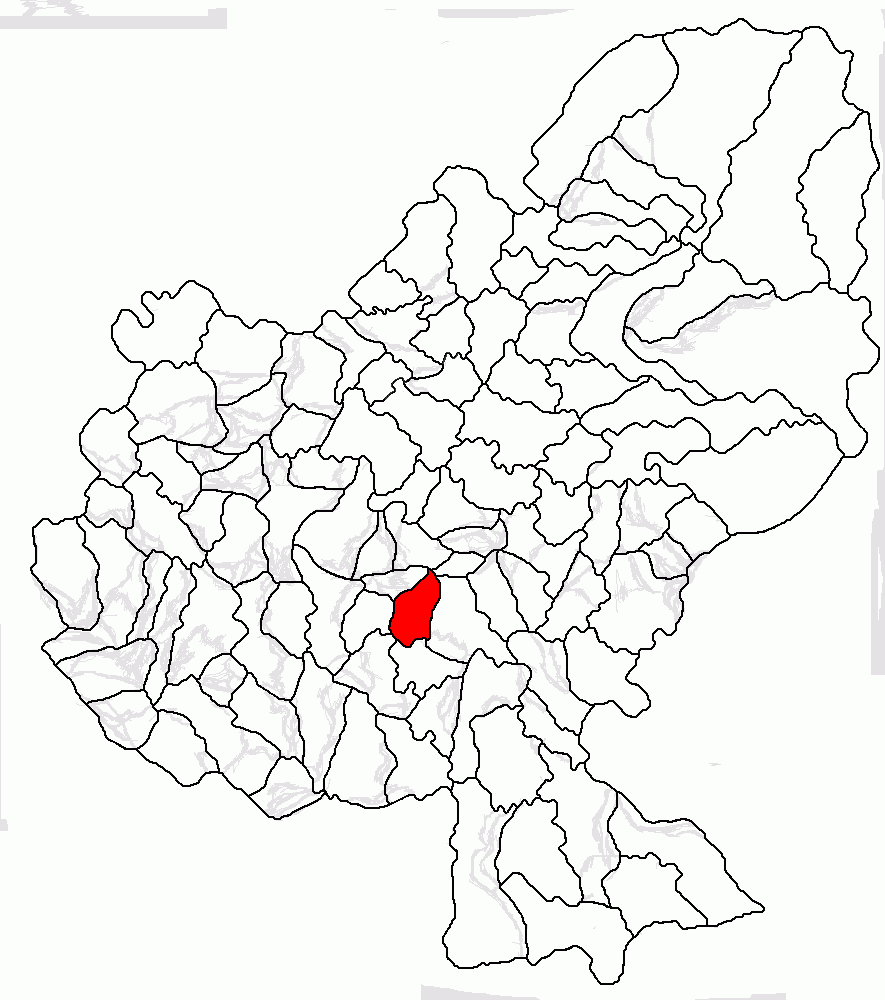
- Location in Mureș County

- Location in Romania
- Coordinates: 46.48°N 24.58°E
- Country: Romania
- County: Mureș

Government
  - Mayor (2024–2028): Károly Gyula Bodó (UDMR)
- Area: 48.36 km^{2} (18.67 sq mi)
- Elevation: 325 m (1,066 ft)
- Population (2021-12-01): 4,338
  - Density: 89.70/km^{2} (232.3/sq mi)
- Time zone: UTC+02:00 (EET)
  - Summer (DST): UTC+03:00 (EEST)
- Postal code: 547175
- Area code: (+40) 0265
- Vehicle reg.: MS
- Website: comunacraciunesti.ro

Crăciunești (Hungarian: Nyárádkarácson; Hungarian pronunciation: [ɲaːraːdkɒraːtʃoɲ]) is a commune in Mureș County, Transylvania, Romania. It is composed of eight villages: Budiu Mic (Hagymásbodon), Ciba (Csiba), Cinta (Fintaháza), Cornești (Somosd), Crăciunești, Foi (Folyfalva), Nicolești (Káposztásszentmiklós), and Tirimioara (Kisteremi). Ciba, Foi, and Nicolești were established in 2006.

At the 2021 census, the commune had a population of 4,338, of which 64.36% were Hungarians, 20.75% Roma, and 5.12% Romanians.

== See also ==
- List of Hungarian exonyms (Mureș County)
