= Moacșa =

Moacșa Maksa
- Commune
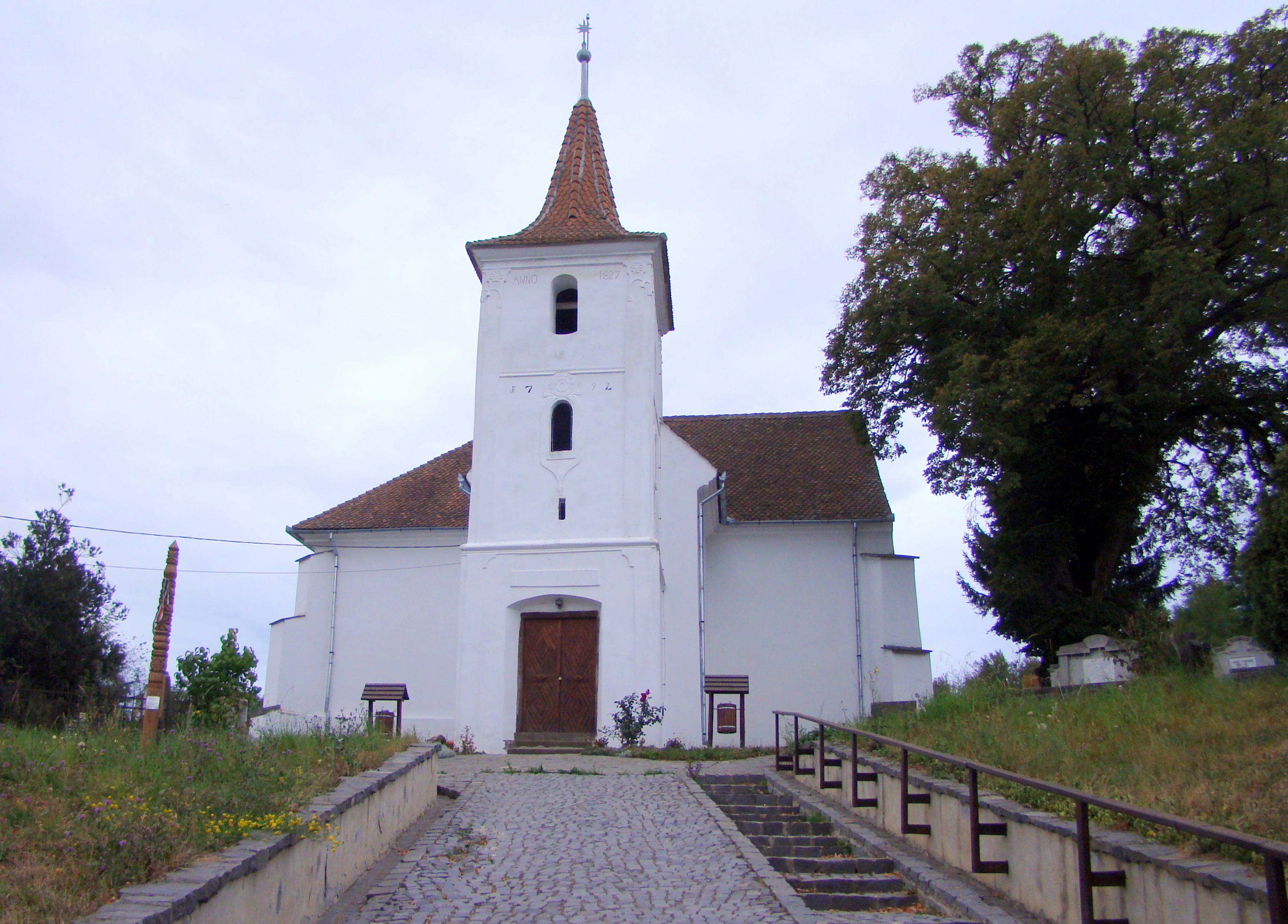
- Reformed church in Pădureni

- Coat of arms

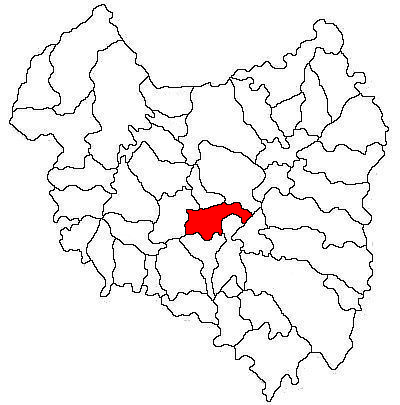
- Location in Covasna County

- Location in Romania
- Coordinates: 45°52′N 25°58′E
- Country: Romania
- County: Covasna

Government
  - Mayor (2020–2024): János Deszke (UDMR)
- Area: 32.82 km^{2} (12.67 sq mi)
- Elevation: 547 m (1,795 ft)
- Population (2021-12-01): 1,239
  - Density: 37.75/km^{2} (97.78/sq mi)
- Time zone: UTC+02:00 (EET)
  - Summer (DST): UTC+03:00 (EEST)
- Postal code: 527120
- Area code: (+40) 02 67
- Vehicle reg.: CV
- Website: www.moacsa.ro

Moacșa (Hungarian: Maksa, Hungarian pronunciation: [ˈmɒkʃɒ]) is a commune in Covasna County, Transylvania, Romania composed of two villages: Moacșa and Pădureni (Sepsibesenyő).

== History ==
The locality formed part of the Székely Land region of the historical Transylvania province. Until 1918, the village belonged to the Háromszék County of the Kingdom of Hungary. In the aftermath of World War I, the Union of Transylvania with Romania was declared in December 1918. At the start of the Hungarian–Romanian War of 1918–1919, the town passed under Romanian administration. After the Treaty of Trianon of 1920, it became part of the Kingdom of Romania and fell within plasa Ozun of Trei Scaune County. In 1940, the Second Vienna Award granted Northern Transylvania to the Kingdom of Hungary. In September 1944, during World War II, Romanian and Soviet armies entered the locality. The territory of Northern Transylvania remained under Soviet military administration until March 9, 1945, after which it became again part of Romania. Between 1952 and 1960, Moacșa belonged to the Magyar Autonomous Region, and between 1960 and 1968 it was part of the Brașov Region. In 1968, when Romania was reorganized based on counties rather than regions, the commune became part of Covasna County. In 2004, Dalnic broke off from Moacșa to form an independent commune.

== Demographics ==
Historical population
Year	Pop.	±%
1850	1,375	—
1941	1,661	+20.8%
2002	1,280	−22.9%
2011	1,201	−6.2%
2021	1,239	+3.2%
Source: Census data

The commune has an absolute Székely Hungarian majority. At the 2011 census, it had a population of 1,206, of which 94.69% or 1,142 were Hungarians. At the 2021 census, Moacșa had a population of 1,239, of which 94.43% were Hungarians and 2.42% Romanians.
