= Bereck =

Bereck can refer to:

- Hungarian for Brețcu, commune in Covasna County, Romania
- Bereck Kofman (1900–1943), Polish-born French Hasidic rabbi
