= Merești =

Merești Homoródalmás
- Commune
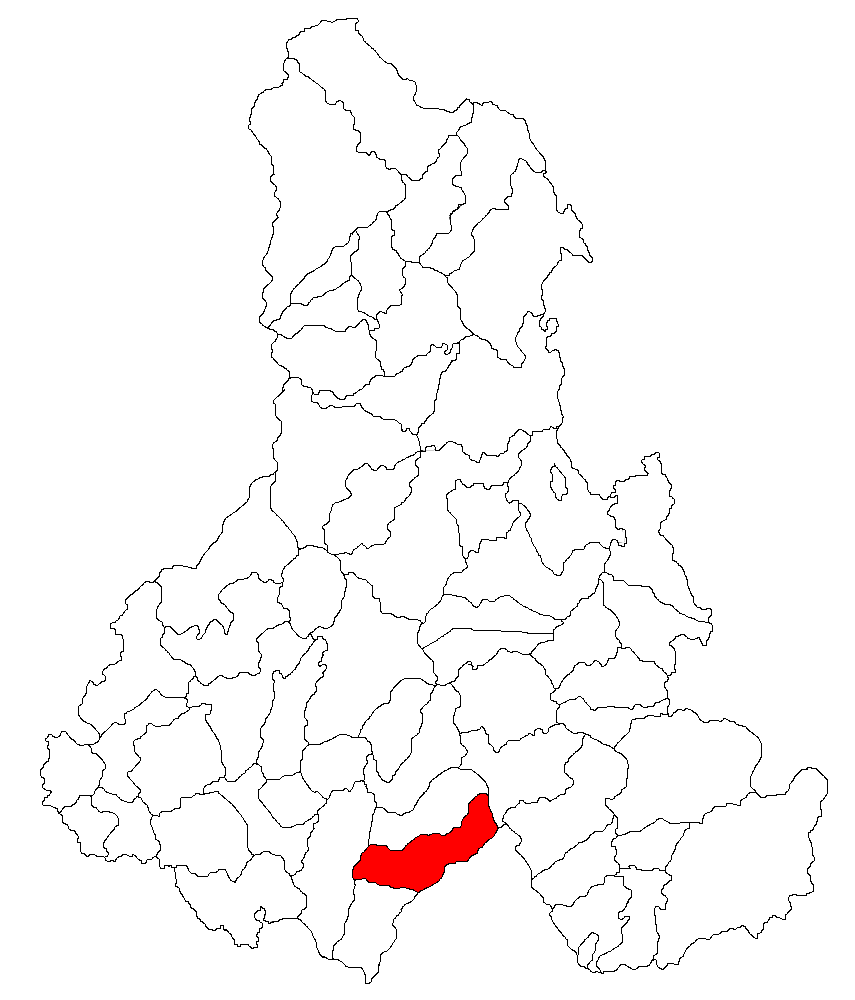
- Location in Harghita County

- Location in Romania
- Coordinates: 46°14′N 25°27′E
- Country: Romania
- County: Harghita

Government
  - Mayor (2020–2024): László Tikosi (UDMR)
- Area: 112.25 km^{2} (43.34 sq mi)
- Elevation: 557 m (1,827 ft)
- Population (2021-12-01): 1,243
  - Density: 11.07/km^{2} (28.68/sq mi)
- Time zone: UTC+02:00 (EET)
  - Summer (DST): UTC+03:00 (EEST)
- Postal code: 537195
- Area code: +40 266
- Vehicle reg.: HR
- Website: homorodalmas.ro

Merești (Hungarian: Homoródalmás or colloquially Almás, Hungarian pronunciation:[ˈhomoroːdɒlmaːʃ], meaning "Place of Apples on the Homorod") is a commune in Harghita County, Romania. It lies in the Székely Land, an ethno-cultural region in eastern Transylvania. It is composed of a single village, Merești. Its elevation is 557 m (1,827 ft).

== History ==
The village is likely to have been formed from 7 small settlements in the 13th century: Varjas, Kakód, Benesfalva, Almás, Bencőfalva, Cikefalva, Tankófalva. It was first recorded in 1333 when a sacerdos de Almas was mentioned. In 1808, its name appears as Almás, in Romanian Poiana Marului. Before World War I, its Romanian name was also Homorod-Almaşş. In 1762, the villagers refused to perform military service, therefore, as a retaliation a company of the Atlhan cavalry regiment was stationed and housed in the village. In the 19th century, the village became a famous center of manufacturing of painted furniture. The village was part of the Székely Land region of the historical Transylvania province. It belonged to Udvarhelyszék district until the administrative reform of Transylvania in 1876, when it fell within the Udvarhely County in the Kingdom of Hungary. After the Treaty of Trianon of 1920, the village became part of Romania and fell within Odorhei County during the interwar period. In 1940, the second Vienna Award granted the Northern Transylvania to Hungary and the villages were held by Hungary until 1944. After Soviet occupation, the Romanian administration returned and the commune became officially part of Romania in 1947. Between 1952 and 1960, the commune fell within the Magyar Autonomous Region, between 1960 and 1968 the Mureș-Magyar Autonomous Region. In 1968, the province was abolished, and since then, the commune has been part of Harghita County.

== Demographics ==
At the 2011 census, the commune had a population of 1,339; out of them, 97% were Hungarian, 0.4% were Roma and 0.4% were Romanian. 98% had Hungarian as first language, and 0.4% Romanian. 72% of the commune population are Unitarian, 16% are Roman Catholic and 2% are Reformed.

== The Vargyas Gorge ==
East of the village is located the picturesque Vargyas Gorge, which is perhaps the village's most important touristic asset. In the gorge a number of caves are located. A 1,500 m-long (4,900 ft) cave was named after the geographer of the Székely Land Balázs Orbán. The cave was inhabited by man even in prehistoric times, later, in the Middle Ages villagers used it as a fortified refuge. The micro-region’s most important natural area, the Gorge is a wonder of karst topography. At more than 900 hectares, the gorge is dominated by 200-metre (660 ft) white limestone cliffs which, beyond their beauty, are an increasingly popular climbing area. Beneath the cliffs lies a 7.5 kilometre cave system, home to 17 species of bats, and a haven for cave explorers.

== Landmarks ==
- East of the Vargyas Gorge, on the Kőmező (’Stonefield’) ruins of a Romanesque chapel can be seen which had perished probably during the Mongol invasion in 1241-1242. Balázs Orbán thought it might be the former church of Varjas village
- The Unitarian church was built between 1786 and 1793 in late Baroque style, the Roman Catholic church built in 1892.
- West of the village on the Várhegy (Castle hill) traces of a rampart made of earth can be found

== Notable people ==
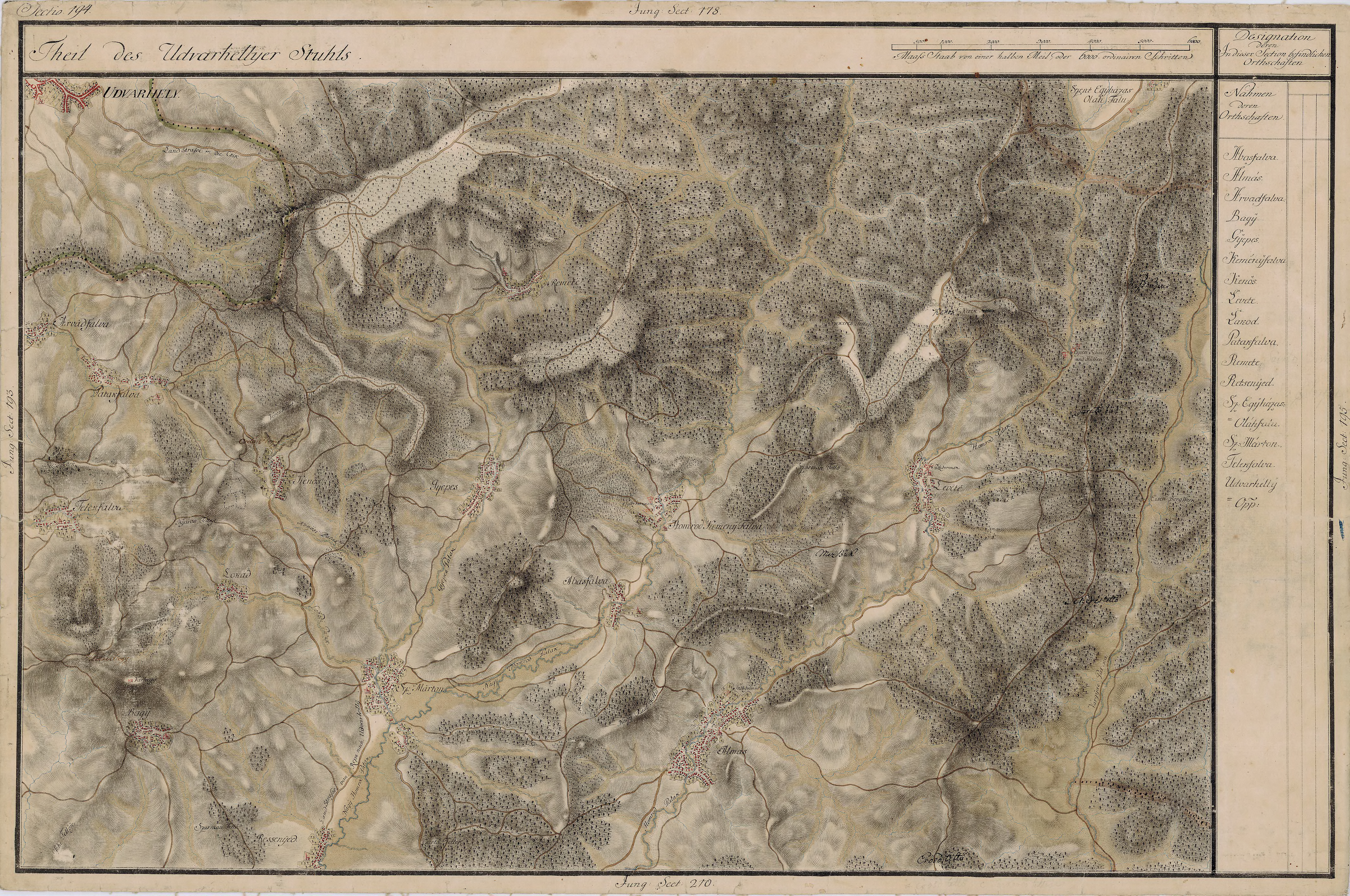
As 'Almas' on Josephinische Landaufnahme, 1769-1773

Natives of the village were:

- Gergely Almási (1654–1724) Unitarian ecclesiastical writer
- Gyula Szabó (1930–2004), novelist
- Emília Péterffy (1915–2000) teacher, writer, author of Hungarian schoolbooks

== Twinnings ==
- Körösszakál, Hungary
- Tokod, Hungary
- Géberjén, Hungary
