= Căpâlnița =

Căpâlnița Kápolnásfalu
- Commune
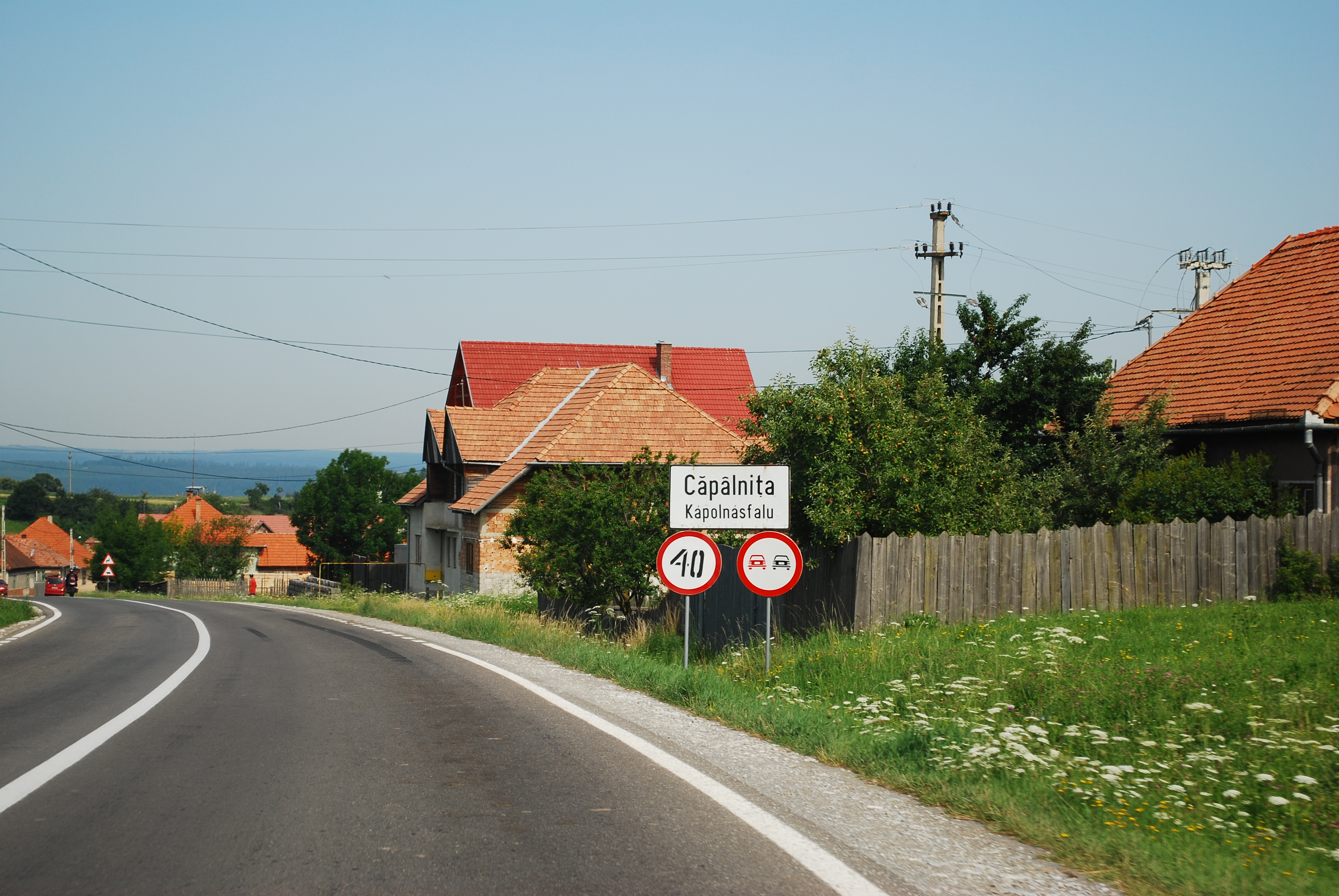

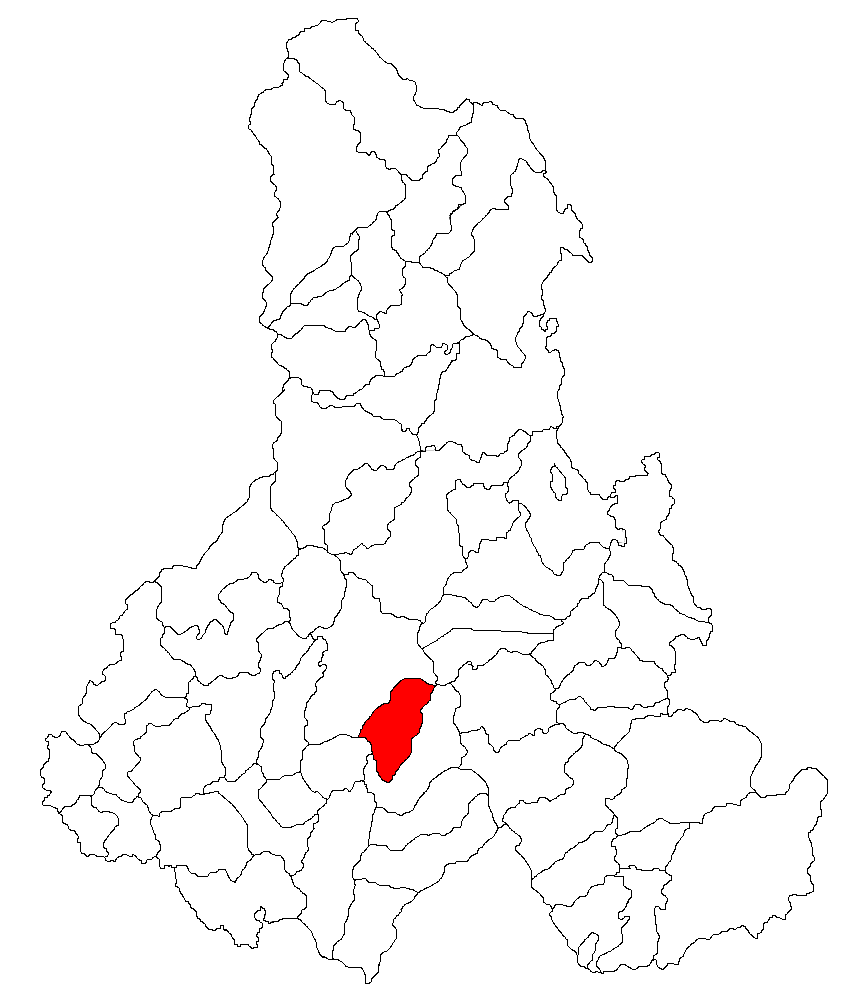
- Location in Harghita County

- Location in Romania
- Coordinates: 46°22′N 25°31′E
- Country: Romania
- County: Harghita

Government
  - Mayor (2020–2024): László Benedek (AMT)
- Area: 26.5 km^{2} (10.2 sq mi)
- Population (2021-12-01): 2,036
  - Density: 76.8/km^{2} (199/sq mi)
- Time zone: UTC+02:00 (EET)
  - Summer (DST): UTC+03:00 (EEST)
- Postal code: 537030
- Area code: +40 266
- Vehicle reg.: HR
- Website: www.kapolnasfalu.ro

Căpâlnița (Hungarian: Kápolnásfalu, Hungarian pronunciation: [ˈkaːpolnaːʃfɒlu], meaning "Village with a Chapel") is a commune in Harghita County, Romania. It lies in the Székely Land, an ethno-cultural region in eastern Transylvania. It is composed of a single village, Căpâlnița.

== History ==
The village belonged to Udvarhelyszék district until the administrative reform of Transylvania in 1876, when they fell within the Udvarhely County in the Kingdom of Hungary. After the Treaty of Trianon of 1920, they became part of Romania and fell within Odorhei County during the interwar period. In 1940, the second Vienna Award granted the Northern Transylvania to Hungary and the villages were held by Hungary until 1944. After Soviet occupation, the Romanian administration returned and the commune became officially part of Romania in 1947. Between 1952 and 1960, the commune fell within the Magyar Autonomous Region, between 1960 and 1968 the Mureș-Magyar Autonomous Region. In 1968, the province was abolished, and since then, the commune has been part of Harghita County.

== Demographics ==
At the 2011 census, the commune had a population of 2,026; out of them, 95% were Hungarian, 4% were Roma and 0.2% were Romanian. 96% of the commune population are Roman Catholic, 1% are Reformed, 1% are Unitarian and 0.2% are Orthodox.
