= Micfalău =

Micfalău Mikóújfalu
- Commune
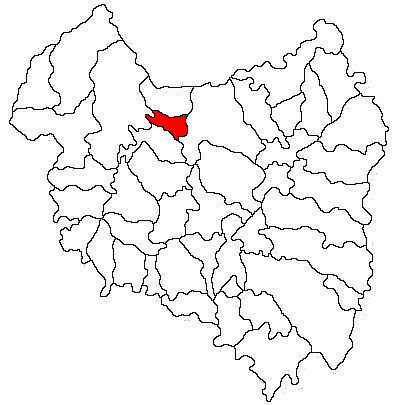
- Location in Covasna County

- Location in Romania
- Coordinates: 46°3′N 25°50′E
- Country: Romania
- County: Covasna

Government
  - Mayor (2020–2024): Ferenc Demeter (UDMR)
- Area: 35.58 km^{2} (13.74 sq mi)
- Elevation: 610 m (2,000 ft)
- Population (2021-12-01): 1,635
  - Density: 46/km^{2} (120/sq mi)
- Time zone: EET/EEST (UTC+2/+3)
- Postal code: 527115
- Area code: (+40) 02 67
- Vehicle reg.: CV
- Website: mikoujfalu.ro

Micfalău (Hungarian: Mikóújfalu, Hungarian pronunciation: [ˈmikoːuːjfɒlu]; German: Mikoneudorf) is a commune in Covasna County, Transylvania, Romania. It is composed of a single village, Micfalău.

== History ==
The village formed part of the Székely Land region of the historical Transylvania province. Until 1918, it belonged to the Háromszék County of the Kingdom of Hungary. In the immediate aftermath of World War I, following the declaration of the Union of Transylvania with Romania, the area passed under Romanian administration during the Hungarian–Romanian War of 1918–1919. By the terms of the Treaty of Trianon of 1920, it became part of the Kingdom of Romania.

In 1925, the commune fell within Plasa Sfântu Gheorghe of Trei Scaune County. In August 1940, under the auspices of Nazi Germany, which imposed the Second Vienna Award, Hungary retook the territory of Northern Transylvania (which included Micfalău) from Romania. Towards the end of World War II, however, the commune was taken back from Hungarian and German troops by Romanian and Soviet forces in September 1944.

In 1950, after Communist Romania was established, Micfalău became part of the Târgu Secuiesc Raion of Stalin Region. From 1952 and 1960, it was part of the Magyar Autonomous Region, and between 1960 and 1968 it reverted to Brașov Region. In 1968, when Romania was reorganized based on counties rather than regions, Micfalău became part of Covasna County. Later, it became a component village of Malnaș, but became an independent commune when it split in 2004.

== Demographics ==
Historical population
Year	Pop.	±%
1850	1,038	—
1930	1,672	+61.1%
1966	2,073	+24.0%
2002	1,864	−10.1%
2011	1,805	−3.2%
2021	1,635	−9.4%
Source: Census data

The commune has an absolute Székely Hungarian majority. According to the 2011 census, it had a population of 1,805, of which 97.12% were Hungarians and 2.12% Romanians. At the 2021 census, Micfalău had a population of 1,635; of those, 93.03% were Hungarians and 2.14% Romanians.
