= Păuleni-Ciuc =

Păuleni-Ciuc Csíkpálfalva
- Commune
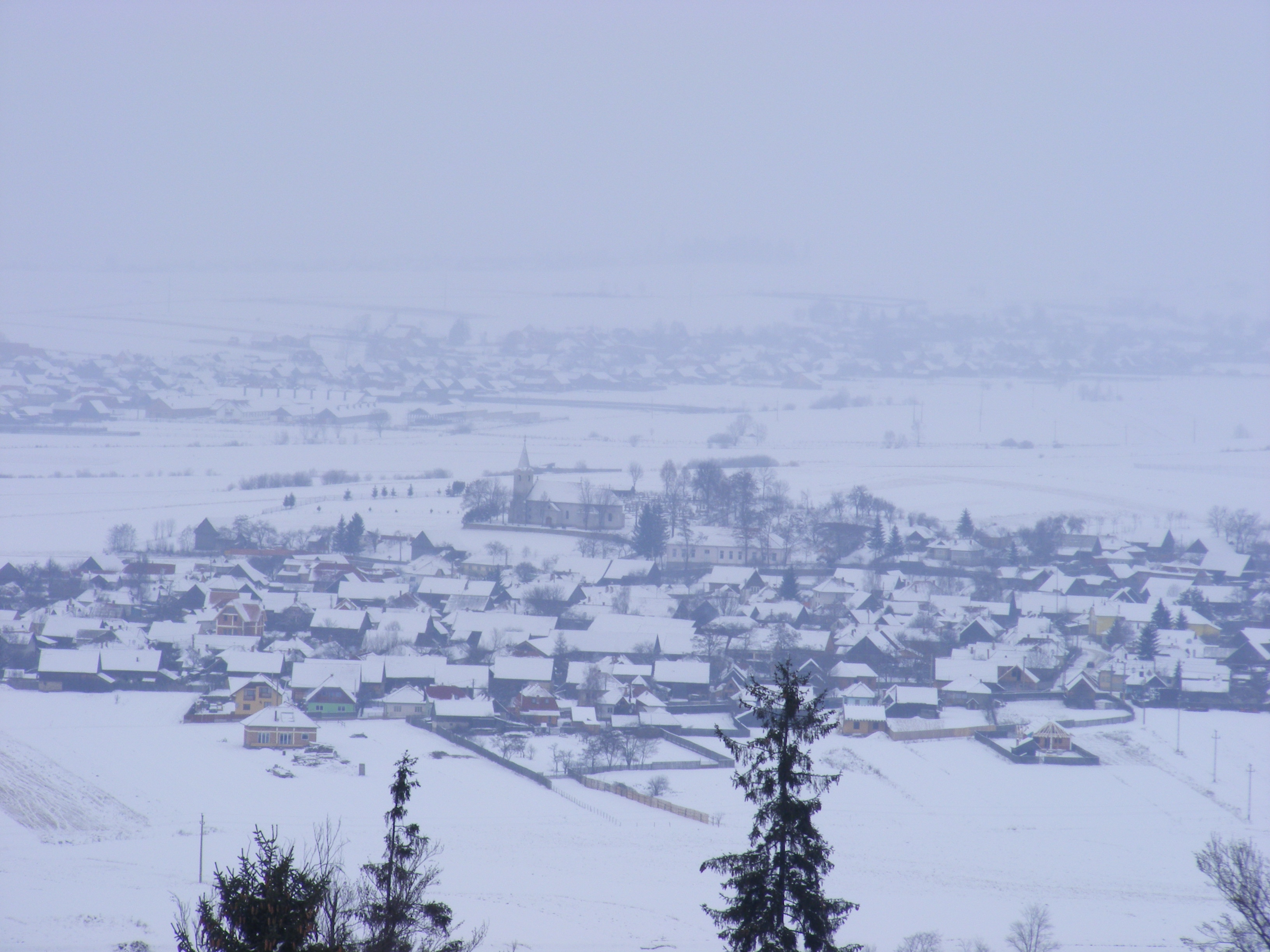
- Păuleni-Ciuc

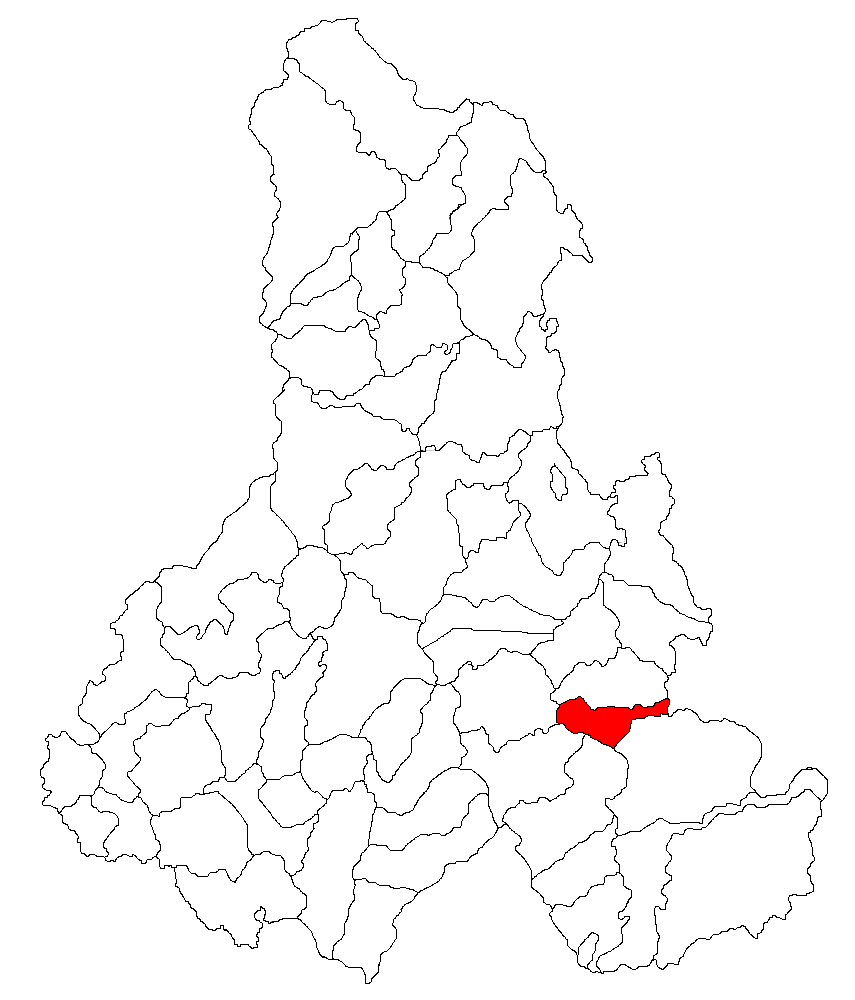
- Location in Harghita County

- Location in Romania
- Coordinates: 46°24′N 25°50′E
- Country: Romania
- County: Harghita

Government
  - Mayor (2020–2024): Csaba Ferencz (UDMR)
- Area: 49.56 km^{2} (19.14 sq mi)
- Elevation: 743 m (2,438 ft)
- Population (2021-12-01): 2,057
  - Density: 41.51/km^{2} (107.5/sq mi)
- Time zone: UTC+02:00 (EET)
  - Summer (DST): UTC+03:00 (EEST)
- Postal code: 537230
- Area code: (+40) 0266
- Vehicle reg.: HR
- Website: comuna-pauleniciuc.ro

Păuleni-Ciuc (Hungarian: Csíkpálfalva or colloquially Pálfalva, Hungarian pronunciation:[ˈtʃiːkpaːlfɒlvɒ], meaning Paul's Village of Csík) is a commune in Harghita County, Romania. It lies in the Székely Land, an ethno-cultural region in eastern Transylvania, and is composed of three villages: Delnița (Csíkdelne), Păuleni-Ciuc, and Șoimeni (Csíkcsomortán).

== Demographics ==
The commune has an absolute Székely (Hungarian) majority. According to the 2011 census it had a population of 1,831, of which 97,16% were Hungarians and 1.64% Romanians. At the 2021 census, Păuleni-Ciuc had 2,057 inhabitants; of those, 91.49% were Hungarians and 1.07% Romanians.
