= Dealu =

Dealu Oroszhegy
- Commune
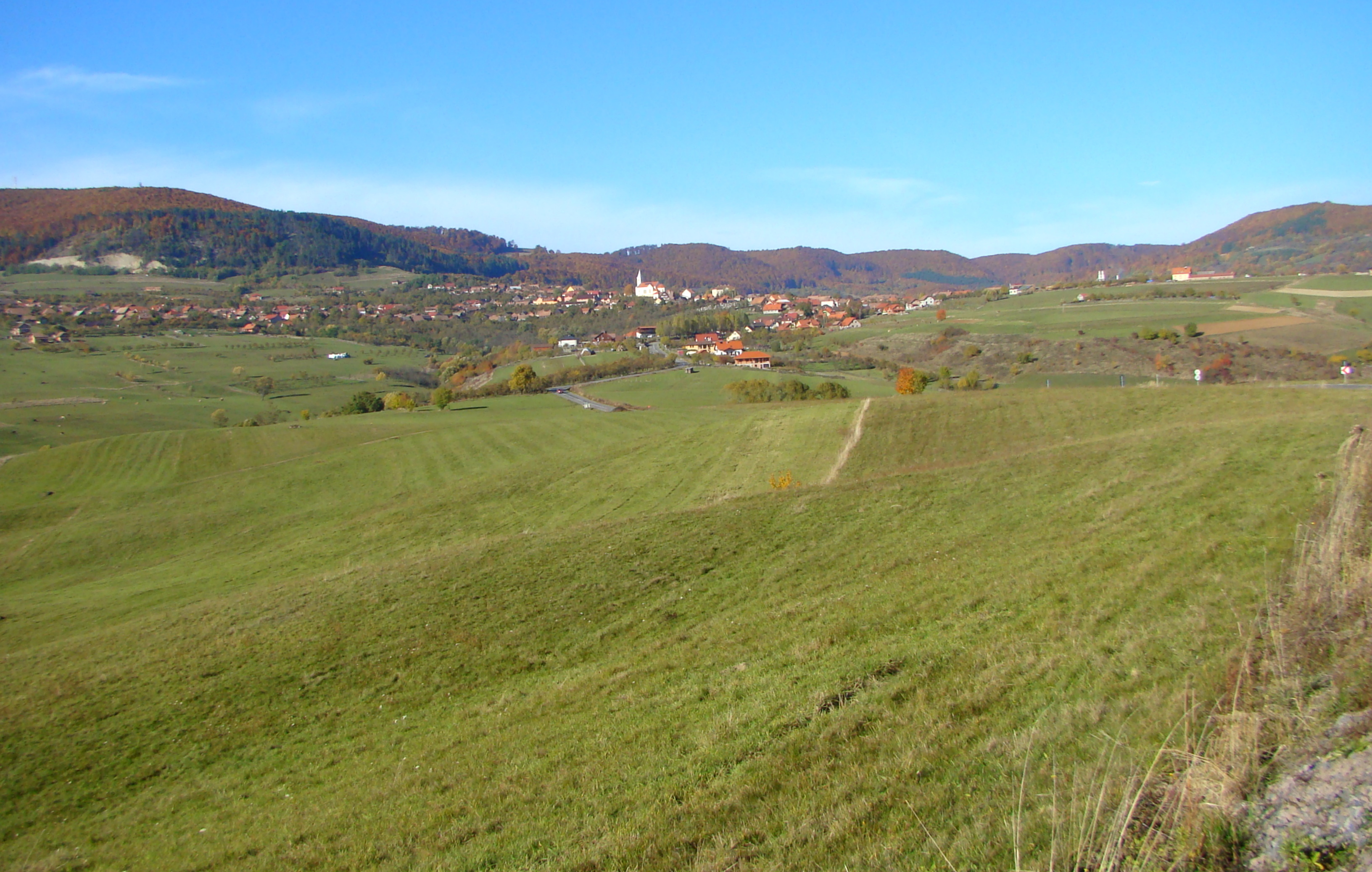

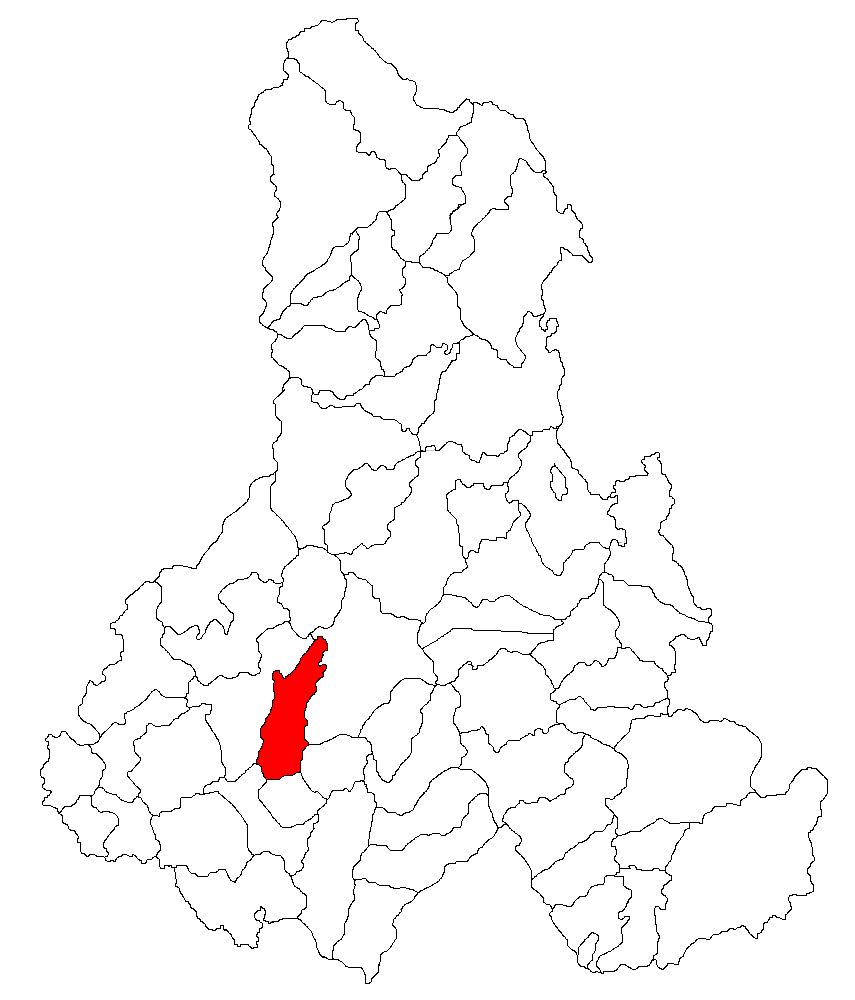
- Location in Harghita County

- Location in Romania
- Coordinates: 46°24′N 25°18′E
- Country: Romania
- County: Harghita

Government
  - Mayor (2020–2024): Elemér Imre Bálint (UDMR)
- Area: 96.95 km^{2} (37.43 sq mi)
- Elevation: 750 m (2,460 ft)
- Population (2021-12-01): 4,104
  - Density: 42.33/km^{2} (109.6/sq mi)
- Time zone: UTC+02:00 (EET)
  - Summer (DST): UTC+03:00 (EEST)
- Postal code: 537080
- Area code: +(40) 266
- Vehicle reg.: HR
- Website: comunadealu.ro

Dealu (Hungarian: Oroszhegy, meaning "Russian Mountain"; Hungarian pronunciation: [ˈoroshɛɟ]) is a commune in Harghita County, Romania. It lies in the Székely Land, an ethno-cultural region in eastern Transylvania. The commune is composed of seven villages: Dealu, Fâncel (Székelyfancsal), Sâncrai (Székelyszentkirály), Tămașu (Székelyszenttamás), Tibod (Tibód), Ulcani (Ülke), and Valea Rotundă (Uknyéd).

The route of the Via Transilvanica long-distance trail passes through the villages of Dealu, Ulcani, and Tămașu. Dealu is also renowned for its plum-based pálinka.

== History ==
The villages belonged to the Székely seat of Udvarhelyszék until the administrative reform of Transylvania in 1876, when they fell within the Udvarhely County in the Kingdom of Hungary. After the Hungarian–Romanian War of 1919 and Treaty of Trianon of 1920, the commune became part of the Kingdom of Romania and fell within plasa Odorhei of Odorhei County during the interwar period. In 1940, the Second Vienna Award granted the Northern Transylvania to Hungary and the villages were held by Hungary until September 1944. After Soviet occupation, the Romanian administration returned in March 1945. Between 1952 and 1960, the commune fell within the Magyar Autonomous Region, between 1960 and 1968 the Mureș-Hungarian Autonomous Region. In 1968, the region was abolished, and since then, Dealu has been part of Harghita County.

== Demographics ==
At the 2011 census, the commune had a population of 3,907; out of those, 98.67% were Hungarians and 0.4% Romanians. At the 2021 census, the Dealu had a population of 4,104; out of those, 95.52% were Hungarians and 1.02% Roma.
