= Subcetate =

- Commune
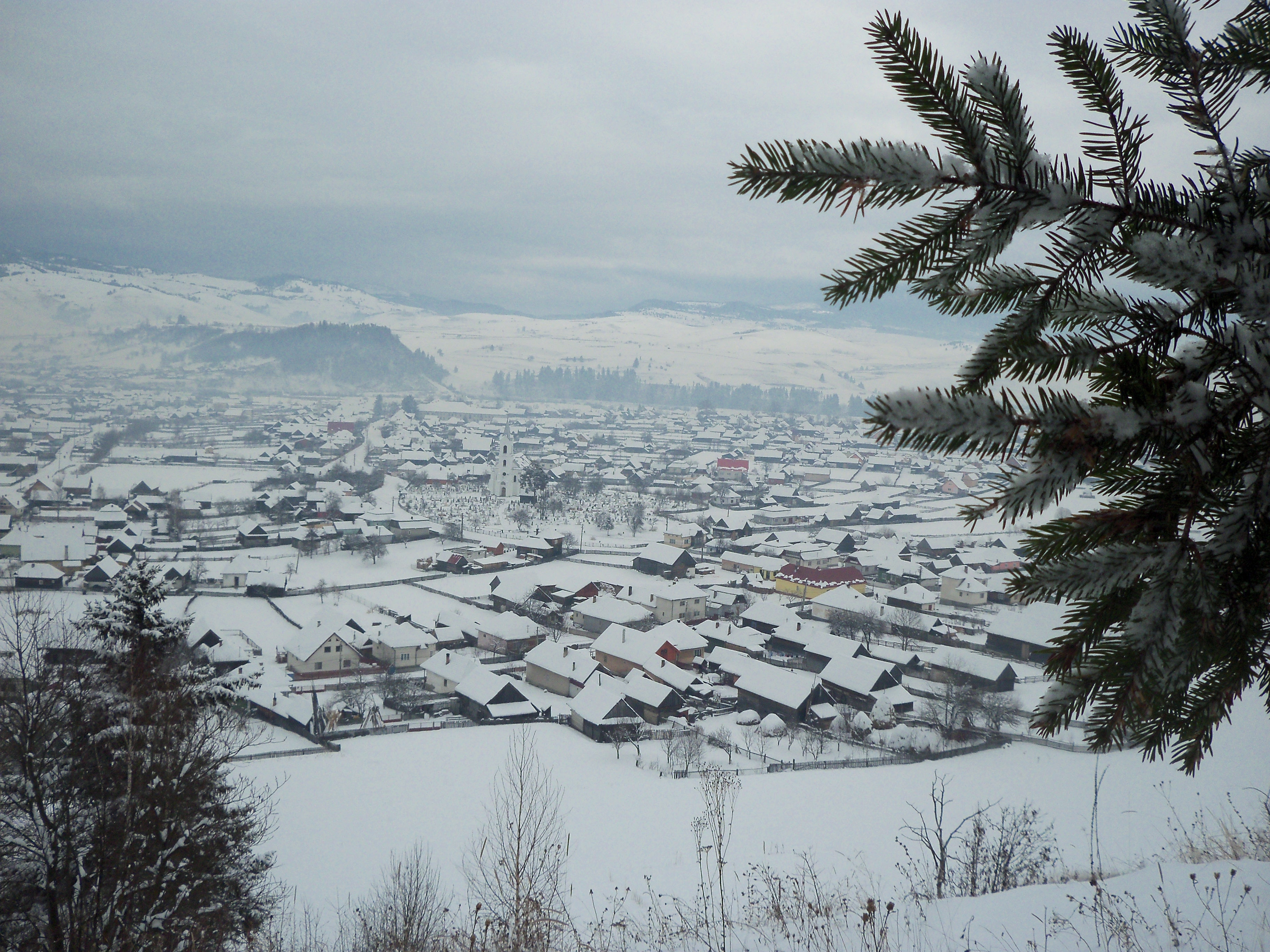

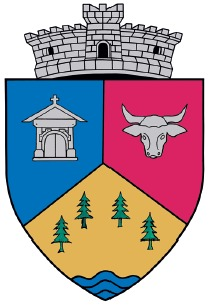
- Coat of arms

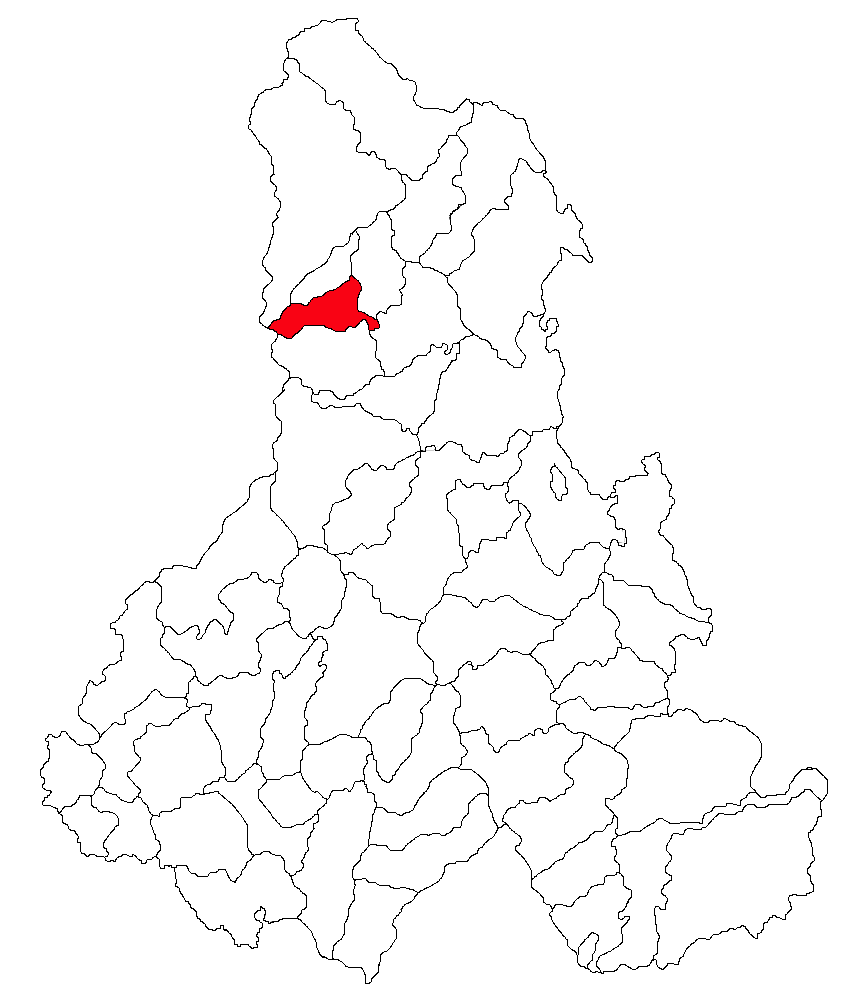
- Location in Harghita County

- Location in Romania
- Coordinates: 46°51′N 25°26′E
- Country: Romania
- County: Harghita

Government
  - Mayor (2020–2024): Vasile Rusu (PSD)
- Area: 51.11 km^{2} (19.73 sq mi)
- Elevation: 712 m (2,336 ft)
- Population (2021-12-01): 1,684
  - Density: 32.95/km^{2} (85.34/sq mi)
- Time zone: UTC+02:00 (EET)
  - Summer (DST): UTC+03:00 (EEST)
- Postal code: 537300
- Area code: +40 x66
- Vehicle reg.: HR
- Website: primariacomuneisubcetate.ro

Subcetate (Hungarian: Gyergyóvárhegy, Hungarian pronunciation: [ˈɟɛrɟoːvaːrhɛɟ]; German: Burgberg) is a commune in Harghita County, Transylvania, Romania. It is composed of four villages: Călnaci (Kalnács), Duda (Dudád), Filpea (Fülpe), and Subcetate.

== Geography ==
The commune is situated at the northeastern edge of Transylvania, at an altitude of 712 m (2,336 ft), in the eastern foothills of the Gurghiu Mountains, and lies on the banks of the Mureș River. Subcetate is located in the northwestern part of the county, on the border with Mureș County. The closest city is Toplița, 15 km (9.3 mi) to the northwest; the county seat, Miercurea Ciuc, is 80 km (50 mi) to the south.

The Subcetate railway station serves the CFR Main Line 400, which connects Brașov to Satu Mare. The commune is crossed by county road DJ153D, which ends 3 km (1.9 mi) to the north in national road DN12 (part of European route E578) that runs from Chichiș, Covasna County to Toplița.

== Population ==
Historical population
Year	Pop.	±%
1850	1,344	—
1920	3,599	+167.8%
1956	2,587	−28.1%
2002	2,105	−18.6%
2011	1,832	−13.0%
2021	1,684	−8.1%
Source: Census data

According to the census in 2002 the commune had a population of 2,105. Ethnic Romanians were the majority, with 1,960 people (93%); although Subcetate historically belongs to the Székely Land, only 100 Hungarians (5%) lived in the village in 2002. 94% of the population followed the Romanian Orthodox faith. At the 2021 census, Subcetate had 1,684 inhabitants; of those, 91.33% were Romanians, 2.97% Hungarians, and 1.54% Roma.
