= Sântimbru, Harghita =

Sântimbru Csíkszentimre
- Commune
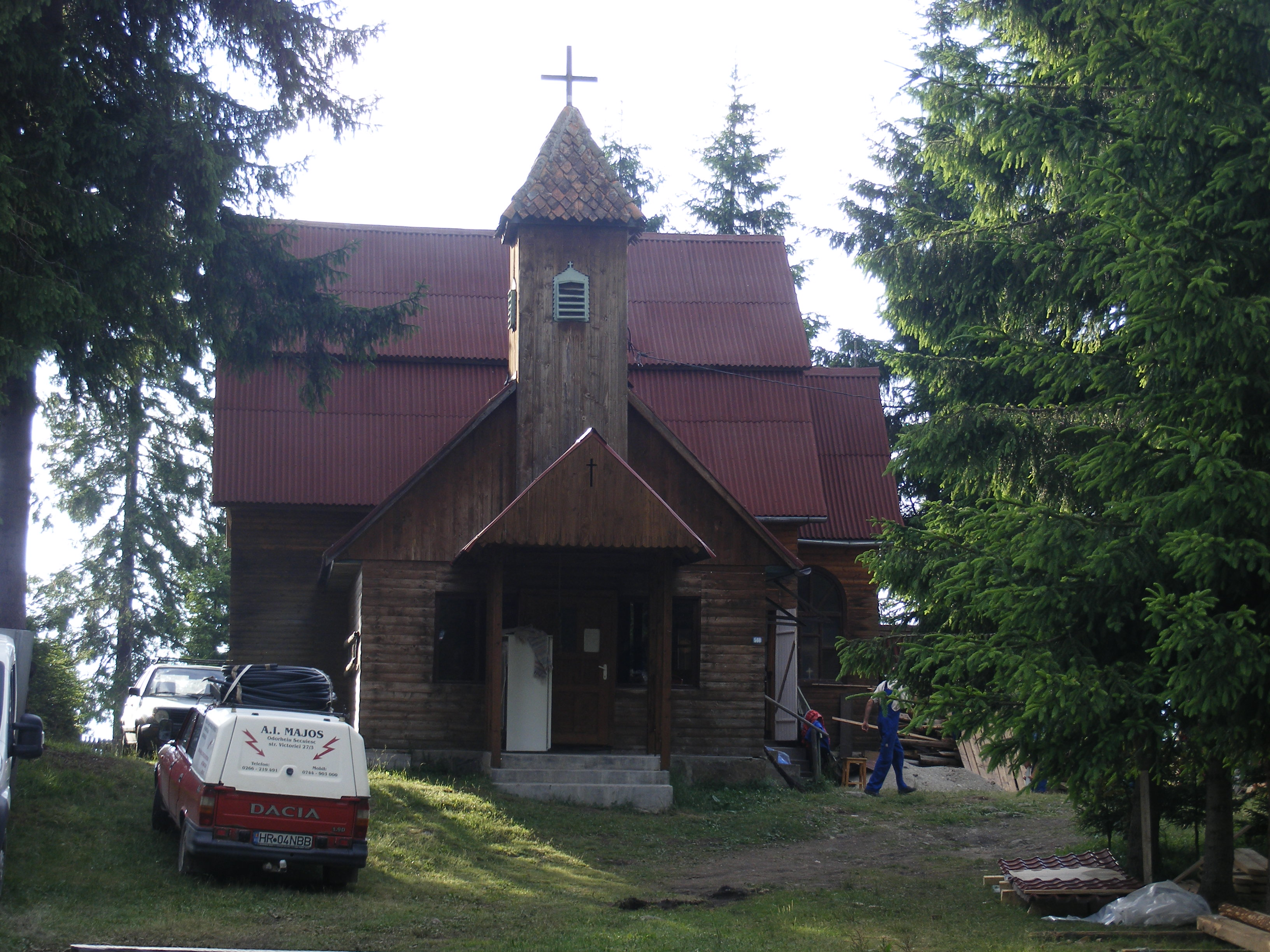

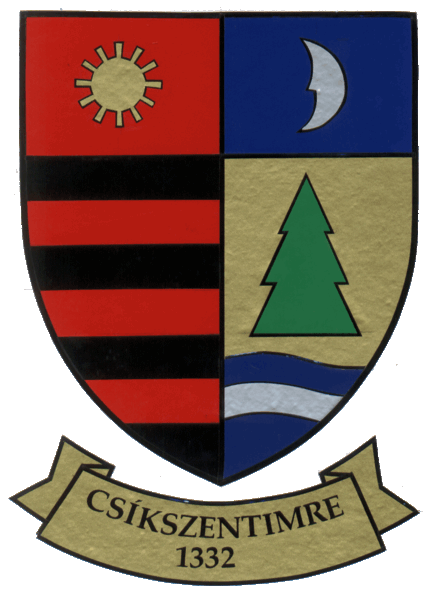
- Coat of arms

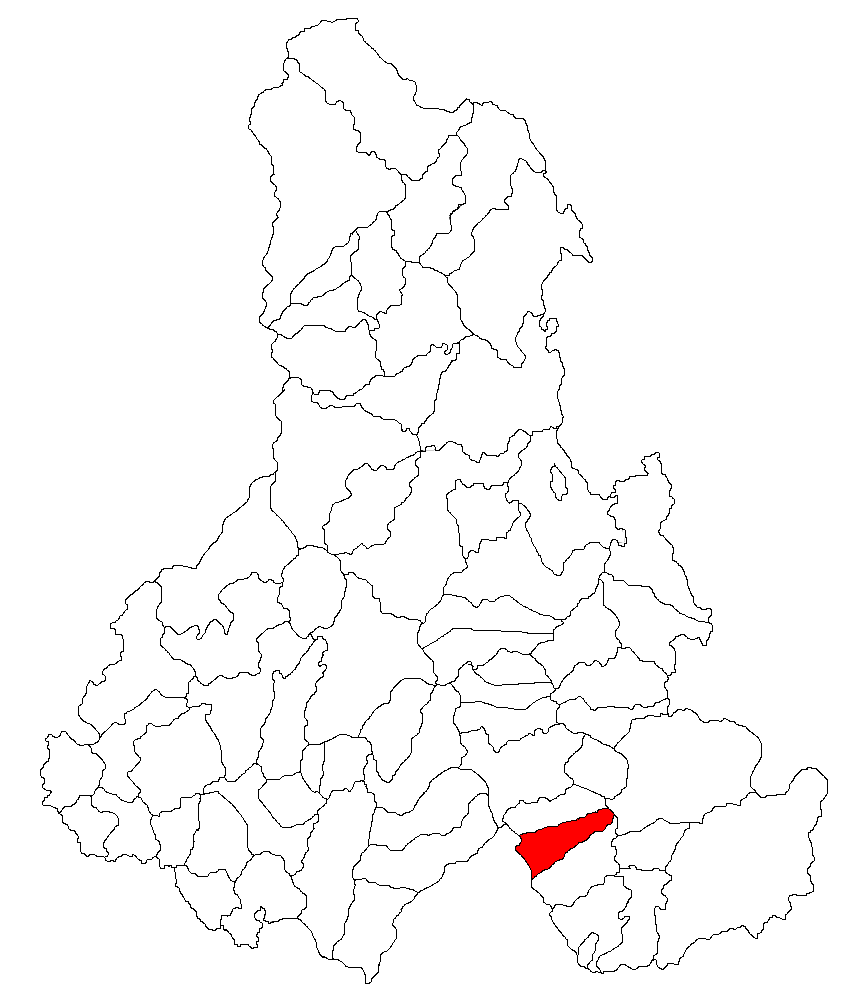
- Location in Harghita County

- Location in Romania
- Coordinates: 46°17′N 25°52′E
- Country: Romania
- County: Harghita

Government
  - Mayor (2020–2024): Előd Kencse (UDMR)
- Area: 52.94 km^{2} (20.44 sq mi)
- Population (2021-12-01): 2,066
  - Density: 39.03/km^{2} (101.1/sq mi)
- Time zone: UTC+02:00 (EET)
  - Summer (DST): UTC+03:00 (EEST)
- Postal code: 537271
- Area code: +40 266
- Vehicle reg.: HR
- Website: www.csikszentimre.ro

Sântimbru (Hungarian: Csíkszentimre or colloquially Szentimre, Hungarian pronunciation: [ˈtʃiːksɛntimrɛ], meaning "St. Emeric of Csík") is a commune in Harghita County, Romania. It lies in the Székely Land, an ethno-cultural region in eastern Transylvania.

== Component villages ==
The commune is composed of two villages:

In Romanian	In Hungarian
Sântimbru	Csíkszentimre
Sântimbru-Băi	Szentimrefürdő

== History ==
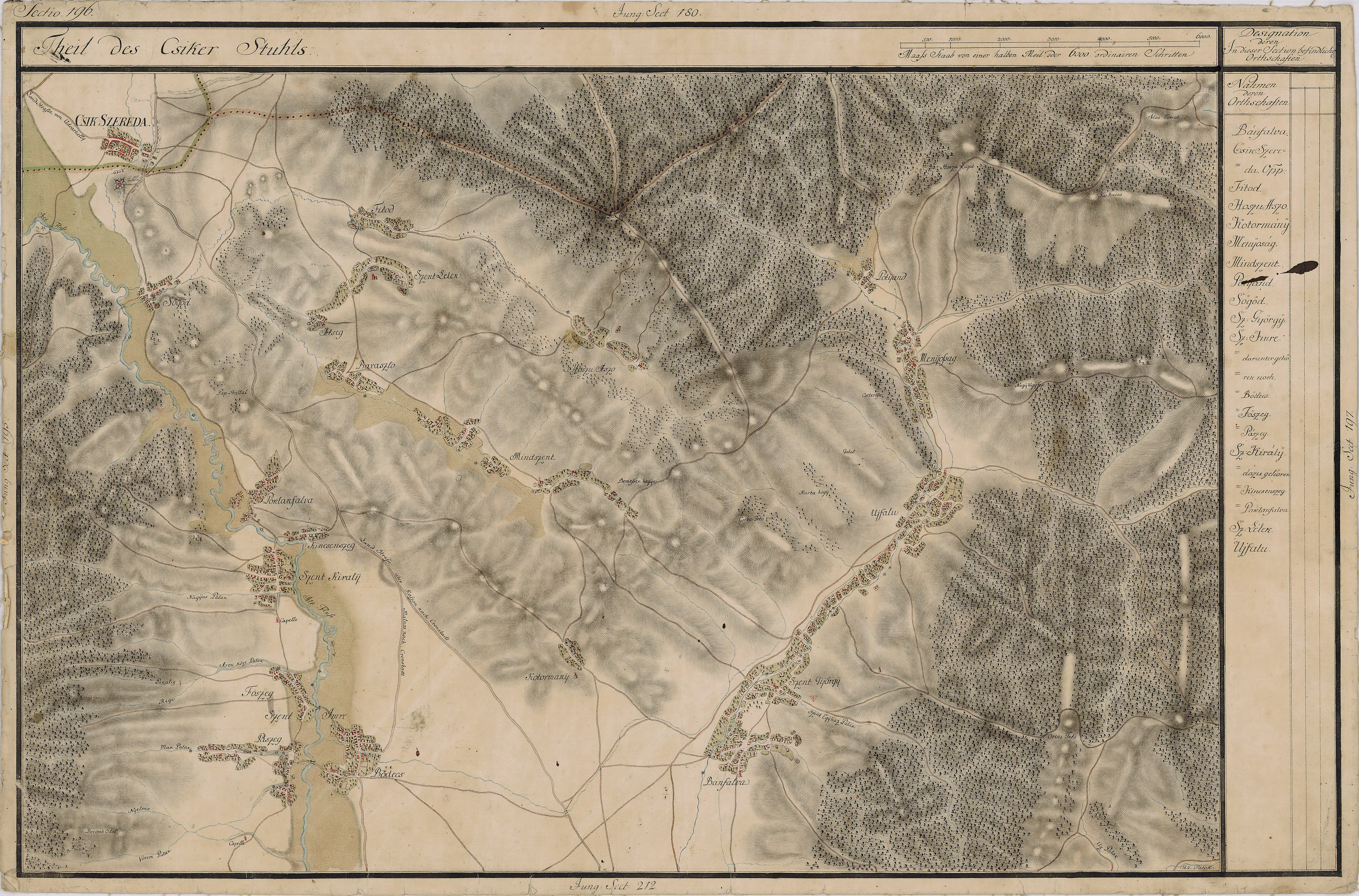
As Szent Imre on 18th century map

The villages forming the commune were part of the Székely Land region of the historical Transylvania province. Between 1762 and 1851, the village belonged to military district of the 3rd Company of the First Székely Infantry Regiment. They belonged to Csíkszék district until the administrative reform of Transylvania in 1876, when they fell within the Csík County in the Kingdom of Hungary. After the Treaty of Trianon of 1920, they became part of Romania and fell within Ciuc County during the interwar period. In 1940, the second Vienna Award granted the Northern Transylvania to Hungary and the villages were held by Hungary until 1944. After Soviet occupation, the Romanian administration returned and the commune officially became part of Romania in 1947. Between 1952 and 1960, the commune fell within the Magyar Autonomous Region, between 1960 and 1968 the Mureș-Magyar Autonomous Region. In 1968, the autonomous region was abolished, and the commune has fallen within Harghita County. They used to be part of Sâncrăieni commune, but the villages broke off in 2004 forming the current commune.

== Demographics ==
The commune has an absolute Hungarian (Székely) majority. According to the 2011 census it has a population of 2,047 of which 97.31% or 1,992 are Hungarian.

== Landmarks ==
- The Saint Margaret Chapel is situated on the Alsó-Erdőalja field, west of the Olt River. It was built in the 14th century and is decorated by medieval frescoes.
- The Roman Catholic parish church was originally built in Gothic style, but an alteration made in 1776 gave to the church its present Baroque shape. The tower and the apsis are from the old church. The local Henter noble family gave large donations for its construction and equipment. In the church are two nice wings of a winged altar from the end of the 15th century. Its eight panels depict the life of Virgin Mary and the passion of Christ. In addition, there are two other panels in the church which are thought to have been parts of another winged altar. Another valuable picture in the church is the “devotional picture ”, an oil painting from 1767 painted by Antal Stephanus. It represents the crucified Jesus Christ with little angels.
- The Henter mansion house is located in Bekecs on the Kúria-hill. The rectangular-shaped building supported by Renaissance-style columns was built by the Henter baron family in Baroque-Renaissance style in 1693. Baron Adam Henter was assassinated in this building in the beginning of the 17th century. After 1944, it was used as a school and a culture house; now the mansion is in ruins.
- The Stinky bath or Sântimbru-Băi is located 13 km west of the village on the side of Büdös-hill. The mineral water of the bath contains sulphur and carbon-dioxide which makes it smell like rotten egg.

== Twinnings ==
The commune is twinned with:

- Balatonberény, Hungary
- Chêne-Bougeries, Switzerland
- Jászó, Hungary
- Káld, Hungary
- Tura, Hungary
