= Neaua =

Neaua Havad
- Commune
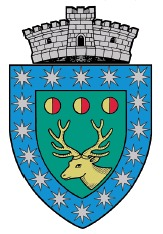
- Coat of arms

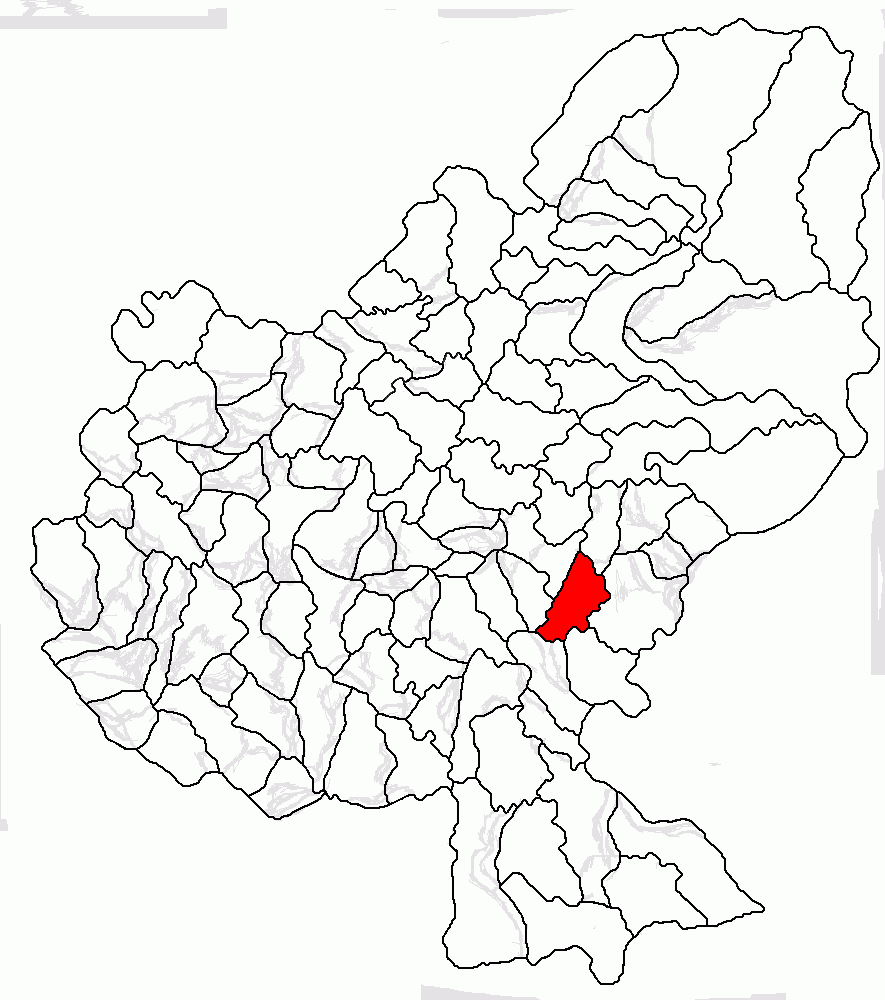
- Location in Mureș County

- Location in Romania
- Coordinates: 46°29′N 24°50′E
- Country: Romania
- County: Mureș

Government
  - Mayor (2020–2024): Gergely Domokos Veress (UDMR)
- Area: 40.04 km^{2} (15.46 sq mi)
- Elevation: 379 m (1,243 ft)
- Population (2021-12-01): 1,231
  - Density: 31/km^{2} (80/sq mi)
- Time zone: EET/EEST (UTC+2/+3)
- Postal code: 547435
- Area code: (+40) 02 65
- Vehicle reg.: MS
- Website: neaua.ro

Neaua (Hungarian: Havad, pronounced [ˈhɒvɒd]) is a commune in Mureș County, Transylvania, Romania composed of five villages: Ghinești (Geges), Neaua, Rigmani (Rigmány), Sânsimion (Nyárádszentsimon), and Vădaș (Vadasd).

== Demographics ==
Historical population
Year	Pop.	±%
1850	1,927	—
1941	2,653	+37.7%
1992	1,632	−38.5%
2002	1,544	−5.4%
2011	1,369	−11.3%
2021	1,231	−10.1%
Source: Census data

The commune has an absolute Székely Hungarian majority. According to the 2011 census, it had a population of 1,369, of which 89.4% were Hungarians and 7.5% Roma. At the 2021 census, Neaua had a population of 1,231, of which 78.72% were Hungarians and 16.9% Roma.

== Natives ==
- József Madaras (1937–2007), Hungarian film actor

== See also ==
- List of Hungarian exonyms (Mureș County)
