= Gheorghe Doja, Mureș =

Gheorghe Doja Lukafalva
- Commune
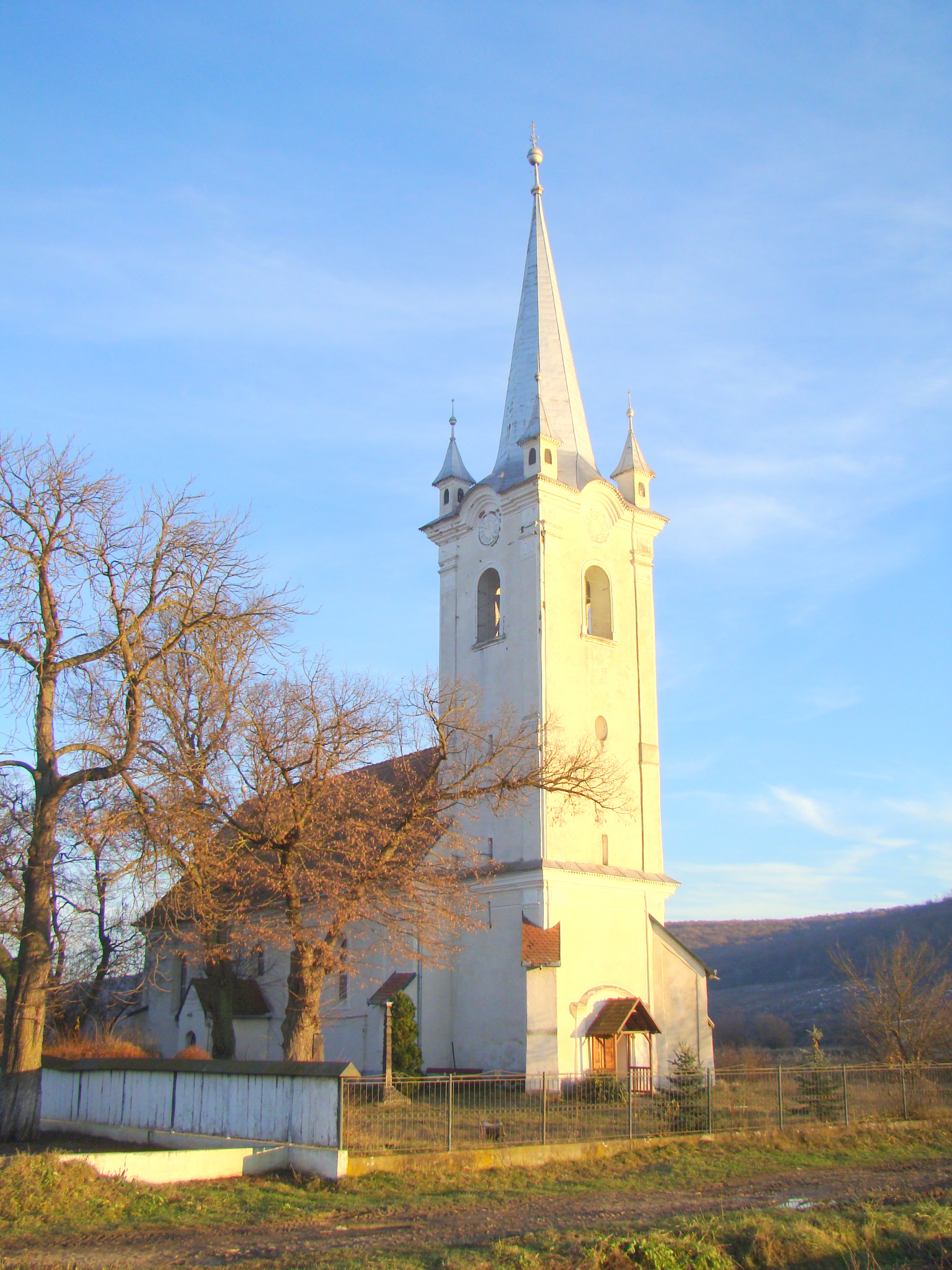
- Reformed church in Gheorghe Doja

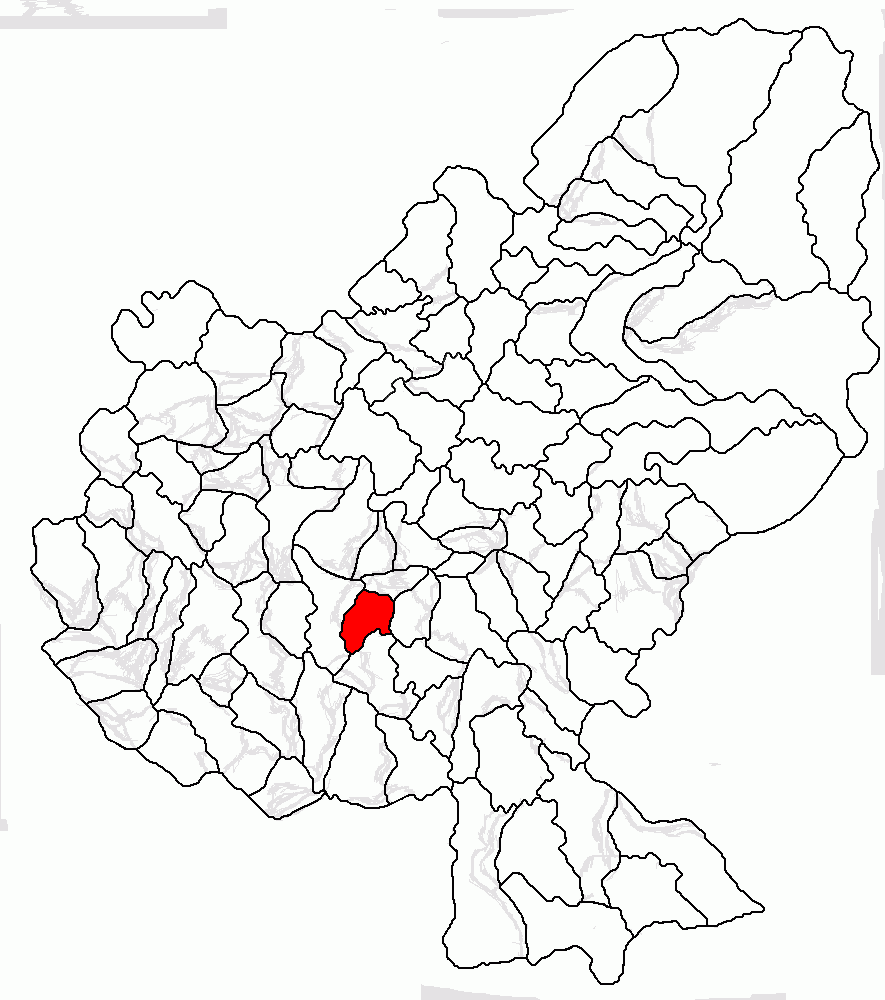
- Location in Mureș County

- Location in Romania
- Coordinates: 46°28′N 24°30′E
- Country: Romania
- County: Mureș

Government
  - Mayor (2020–2024): Tibor Iszlai (UDMR)
- Area: 37.45 km^{2} (14.46 sq mi)
- Elevation: 303 m (994 ft)
- Population (2021-12-01): 3,101
  - Density: 82.80/km^{2} (214.5/sq mi)
- Time zone: UTC+02:00 (EET)
  - Summer (DST): UTC+03:00 (EEST)
- Postal code: 547260
- Area code: (+40) 0265
- Vehicle reg.: MS
- Website: gheorghedoja.ro

Gheorghe Doja (Hungarian: Lukafalva, Hungarian pronunciation: [ˈlukɒfɒlvɒ]) is a commune in Mureș County, Transylvania, Romania composed of five villages: Gheorghe Doja, Ilieni (Lukailencfalva), Leordeni (Lőrincfalva), Satu Nou (Teremiújfalu), and Tirimia (Nagyteremi).

== History ==
The locality was mentioned for the first time in 1409 as Lucafalva. During its history, there were several military raids carried out against the village which also sustained a lot from flooding. In the immediate aftermath of World War I, following the declaration of the Union of Transylvania with Romania, the area passed under Romanian administration during the Hungarian–Romanian War of 1918–1919. By the terms of the Treaty of Trianon of 1920, the village became part of the Kingdom of Romania, under the name Luca. During the interwar period, it belonged to Plasa Mureș de Jos of Mureș County.

In August 1940, the Second Vienna Award granted Northern Transylvania to Hungary and the territory was held by Hungary until October 1944, when it was taken back from Hungarian and German troops by Romanian and Soviet forces. Administered by the Soviet authorities after November 1944, the village, together with the rest of Northern Transylvania, came under Romanian administration in March 1945. In 1952, it was named after György Dózsa, who led a peasants' revolt against landed nobility at the beginning of the 16th century. Between 1952 and 1960, the commune fell within the Magyar Autonomous Region, between 1960 and 1968 the Mureș-Magyar Autonomous Region, and since then, it has been part of Mureș County.

== Demographics ==
Historical population
Year	Pop.	±%
1850	3,054	—
1880	3,119	+2.1%
1900	3,462	+11.0%
1910	3,721	+7.5%
1930	3,775	+1.5%
1941	3,823	+1.3%
1956	3,579	−6.4%
1977	3,319	−7.3%
1992	2,805	−15.5%
2002	2,869	+2.3%
2011	2,982	+3.9%
2021	3,101	+4.0%
Source: Census data

The commune has an absolute Hungarian majority. In 1910, it had a population of 713 Hungarians. According to the 2011 census, Gheorghe Doja has a population of 2,982, of which 72.74% were Hungarians, 20.69% Romanians, and 5% Roma. At the 2021 census, the population had increased to 3,101; of those, 70.85% were Hungarians, 19.93% Romanians, and 3.35% Roma.

== See also ==
- List of Hungarian exonyms (Mureș County)
