= List of settlements in Covasna County =

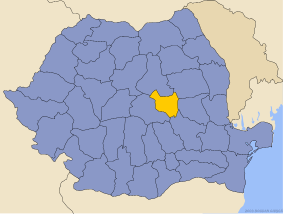
Covasna County in Romania

This is a list of settlements in Covasna County, Romania.

The following are the county's cities and towns, along with their attached villages:

City/Town	Villages
Sfântu Gheorghe	Chilieni, Coșeni
Târgu Secuiesc	Lunga
Baraolt	Biborțeni, Bodoș, Căpeni, Micloșoara
Covasna	Chiuruș
Întorsura Buzăului	Brădet, Floroaia, Scrădoasa

The following are the county's communes, with component villages:

Commune	Villages
Aita Mare	Aita Mare, Aita Medie
Arcuș	Arcuș
Barcani	Barcani, Lădăuți, Sărămaș
Bățani	Aita Seacă, Bățanii Mari, Bățanii Mici, Herculian, Ozunca-Băi
Belin	Belin, Belin-Vale
Bixad	Bixad
Bodoc	Bodoc, Olteni, Zălan
Boroșneu Mare	Boroșneu Mare, Boroșneu Mic, Dobolii de Sus, Leț, Țufalău, Valea Mică
Brateș	Brateș, Pachia, Telechia
Brăduț	Brăduț, Doboșeni, Filia, Tălișoara
Brețcu	Brețcu, Mărtănuș, Oituz
Catalina	Catalina, Hătuica, Imeni, Mărcușa, Mărtineni
Cernat	Cernat, Albiș, Icafalău
Chichiș	Chichiș, Băcel
Comandău	Comandău
Dalnic	Dalnic
Dobârlău	Dobârlău, Lunca Mărcușului, Mărcuș, Valea Dobârlăului
Estelnic	Estelnic, Cărpinenii, Valea Scurtă
Ghelința	Ghelința, Harale
Ghidfalău	Ghidfalău, Angheluș, Fotoș, Zoltan
Hăghig	Hăghig, Iarăș
Ilieni	Ilieni, Dobolii de Jos, Sâncraiu
Lemnia	Lemnia
Malnaș	Malnaș, Malnaș-Băi, Valea Zălanului
Mereni	Mereni, Lutoasa
Micfalău	Micfalău
Moacșa	Moacșa, Pădureni
Ojdula	Ojdula, Hilib
Ozun	Ozun, Bicfalău, Lisnău, Lisnău-Vale, Lunca Ozunului, Măgheruș, Sântionlunca
Poian	Poian, Belani
Reci	Reci, Aninoasa, Bita, Saciova
Sânzieni	Sânzieni, Cașinu Mic, Petriceni, Valea Seacă
Sita Buzăului	Sita Buzăului, Crasna, Merișor, Zăbrătău
Turia	Turia, Alungeni
Valea Crișului	Valea Crișului, Calnic
Valea Mare	Valea Mare
Vâlcele	Vâlcele, Araci, Ariușd, Hetea
Vârghiș	Vârghiș
Zagon	Zagon, Păpăuți
Zăbala	Zăbala, Peteni, Surcea, Tamașfalău
