= Covasna (Râul Negru) =

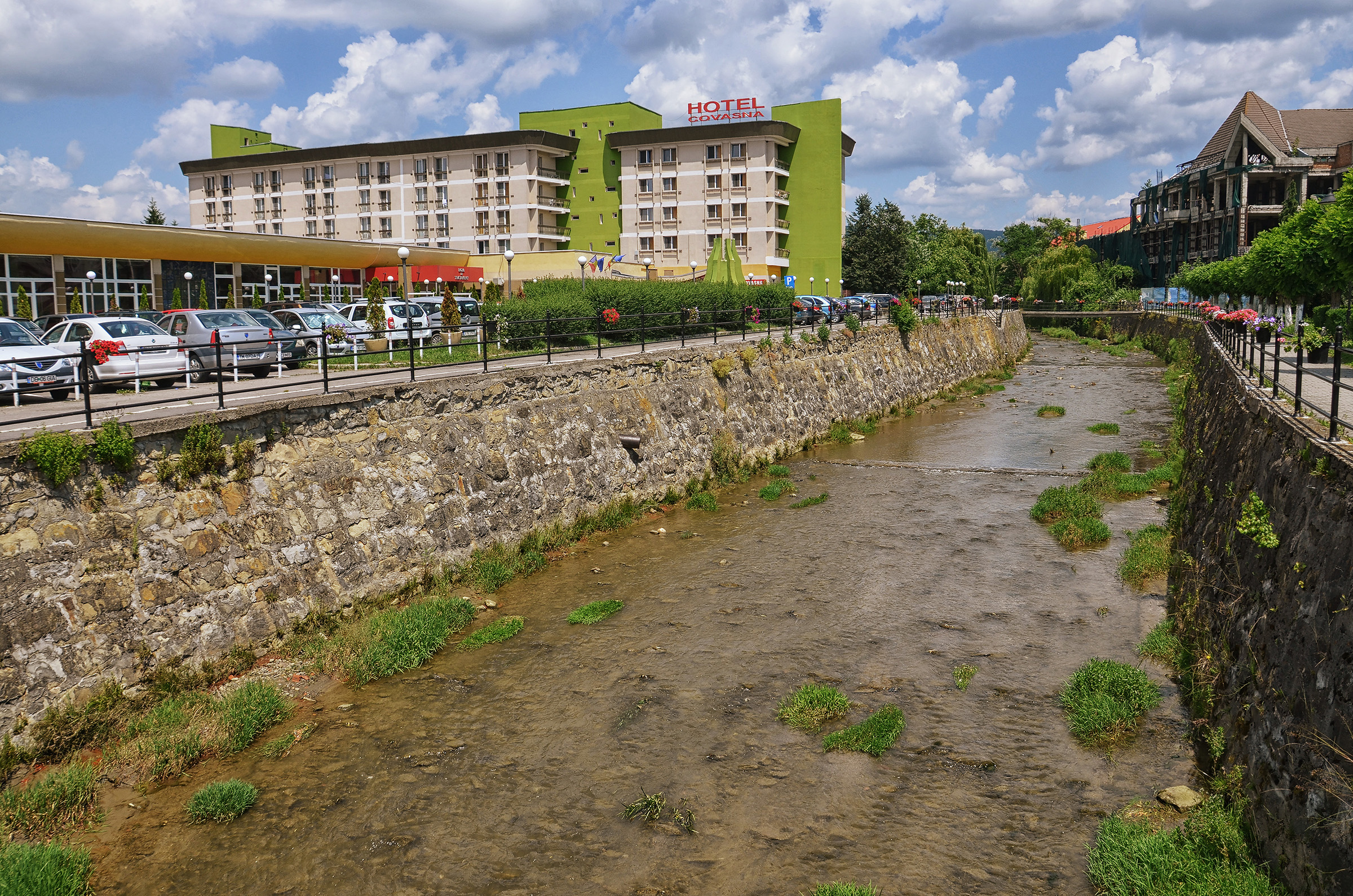

- Location within Romania

Location
- Country: Romania
- Counties: Covasna County
- Villages: Covasna, Pachia, Brateș, Boroșneu Mare

Physical characteristics
- Mouth: Râul Negru
  - location: Bita
  - coordinates: 45.8315°N 25.9619°E
- Length: 28 km (17 mi)
- Basin size: 290 km^{2} (110 sq mi)

Basin features
- Progression: Râul Negru→ Olt→ Danube→ Black Sea
- Tributaries
  - left: Păpăuți, Zagon, Valea Mare, Saciova
  - right: Chetag

The Covasna (Hungarian: Kovászna is a left tributary of the river Râul Negru in Romania. It joins the Râul Negru in Bita. Its length is 28 km (17 mi) and its basin size is 290 km^{2} (110 sq mi).
