= Valea Mare (Covasna) =

- Location within Romania

Location
- Country: Romania
- Counties: Covasna County
- Villages: Valea Mare, Boroșneu Mic, Boroșneu Mare

Physical characteristics
- Mouth: Covasna
  - location: Boroșneu Mare
  - coordinates: 45.8254°N 26.0008°E
- Length: 11 km (6.8 mi)
- Basin size: 29 km^{2} (11 sq mi)

Basin features
- Progression: Covasna→ Râul Negru→ Olt→ Danube→ Black Sea

The Valea Mare is a left tributary of the river Covasna in Romania. It flows into the Covasna in Boroșneu Mare. Its length is 11 km (6.8 mi) and its basin size is 29 km^{2} (11 sq mi).
