= Zagon (river) =

- Location within Romania

Location
- Country: Romania
- Counties: Covasna County
- Villages: Zagon, Boroșneu Mare

Physical characteristics
- Mouth: Covasna
  - location: Boroșneu Mare
  - coordinates: 45.8241°N 26.0108°E
- Length: 21 km (13 mi)
- Basin size: 105 km^{2} (41 sq mi)

Basin features
- Progression: Covasna→ Râul Negru→ Olt→ Danube→ Black Sea
- Tributaries
  - left: Telec
  - right: Zagonul Mic

The Zagon is a left tributary of the river Covasna in Romania. It flows into the Covasna in Boroșneu Mare. Its length is 21 km (13 mi) and its basin size is 105 km^{2} (41 sq mi).
