= Păpăuți =

Păpăuți may refer to:

- Păpăuți, Rezina, a village in Moldova
- Păpăuți (river), a tributary of the Covasna in Romania
- Păpăuți, a village in Zagon commune, Covasna County, Romania
