= Saciova =

- Location within Romania

Location
- Country: Romania
- Counties: Covasna County
- Villages: Saciova, Aninoasa

Physical characteristics
- Mouth: Covasna
  - location: Bita
  - coordinates: 45.8290°N 25.9645°E
- Length: 10 km (6.2 mi)
- Basin size: 14 km^{2} (5.4 sq mi)

Basin features
- Progression: Covasna→ Râul Negru→ Olt→ Danube→ Black Sea
- River code: VIII.1.45.18.6

The Saciova is a left tributary of the river Covasna in Romania. It flows into the Covasna near Bita. Its length is 10 km (6.2 mi) and its basin size is 14 km^{2} (5.4 sq mi).
