= Dalnic (river) =

- Location within Romania

Location
- Country: Romania
- Counties: Covasna County
- Villages: Dalnic, Leț

Physical characteristics
- Mouth: Râul Negru
  - location: Leț
  - coordinates: 45.8397°N 26.0227°E
- Length: 15 km (9.3 mi)
- Basin size: 40 km^{2} (15 sq mi)

Basin features
- Progression: Râul Negru→ Olt→ Danube→ Black Sea
- Tributaries
  - right: Pârâul Cânepii, Nadăș

The Dalnic is a right tributary of the Râul Negru in Romania. It flows into the Râul Negru near Leț. Its length is 15 km (9.3 mi) and its basin size is 40 km^{2} (15 sq mi).
