= Valea Mare, Covasna =

Valea Mare
- Commune
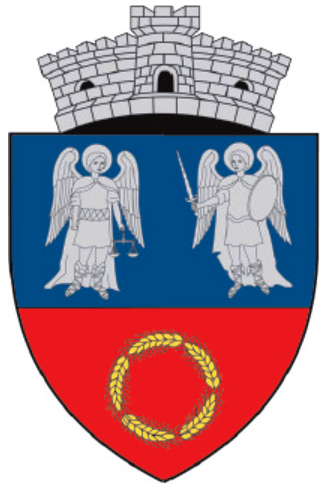
- Coat of arms

- Location in Covasna County

- Location in Romania
- Coordinates: 45°46′N 26°1′E
- Country: Romania
- County: Covasna

Government
  - Mayor (2020–2024): Bogdan-Ștefan Marin (USR PLUS)
- Area: 17.1288 km^{2} (6.6135 sq mi)
- Elevation: 570 m (1,870 ft)
- Population (2021-12-01): 1,066
  - Density: 62.23/km^{2} (161.2/sq mi)
- Time zone: UTC+02:00 (EET)
  - Summer (DST): UTC+03:00 (EEST)
- Postal code: 527170
- Area code: (+40) 02 67
- Vehicle reg.: CV
- Website: valeamare.info

Valea Mare (Hungarian: Nagypatak) is a commune in Covasna County, Transylvania Romania. It is composed of a single village, Valea Mare, which was part of Barcani Commune before being split off in 1999.

== Geography ==
The commune is located in the southern part of Covasna County, 23 km (14 mi) southwest of the town of Covasna and 21 km (13 mi) southeast of the county seat, Sfântu Gheorghe. It is situated at an altitude of 570 m (1,870 ft), in the valley of the stream Valea Mare (Nagypatak).

Valea Mare is crossed by the county road DJ121A, which starts in Întorsura Buzăului, 16 km (10 mi) to the south, and ends in Aita Mare, 53 km (33 mi) to the northwest.

== Demographics ==
Historical population
Year	Pop.	±%
1850	433	—
1941	1,020	+135.6%
1977	1,159	+13.6%
2002	1,177	+1.6%
2011	1,051	−10.7%
2021	1,066	+1.4%
Source: Census data

The commune has an absolute ethnic Romanian majority. According to the 2002 Census it had a population of 1,177, of which 97.45% were Romanians; other minorities were Roma and Hungarians, respectively 1.44% and 1.10% of the population. At the 2011 census, Valea Mare had a population of 1,051, of which 97.62% were Romanians and 1.24% were Hungarians. At the 2021 census, there were 1,066 inhabitants, of which 92.78% were Romanians and 1.97% Hungarians.

== Sights ==
Its Orthodox church was built in 1793. The Valea Mare Monastery was built in 1998 on the initiative of Gheorghe Avram as a monastery situated in the center of Romania.
