= Čiližská Radvaň =

Čiližská Radvaň Csilizradvány
- Municipality
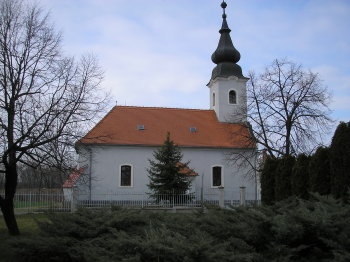

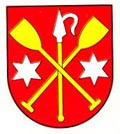
- Flag Coat of arms

- Location of Čiližská Radvaň in the Trnava Region Location of Čiližská Radvaň in Slovakia
- Coordinates: 47.83°N 17.69°E
- Country: Slovakia
- Region: Trnava Region
- District: Dunajská Streda District
- First mentioned: 1252

Government
  - Mayor: István Csikász (Party of the Hungarian Coalition)

Area
  - Total: 21.41 km^{2} (8.27 sq mi)
- Elevation: 110 m (360 ft)

Population (2025)
  - Total: 1,148

Ethnicity
  - Hungarians: 95.40%
  - Slovaks: 3.86%
- Time zone: UTC+1 (CET)
  - Summer (DST): UTC+2 (CEST)
- Postal code: 930 08
- Area code: +421 31
- Vehicle registration plate (until 2022): DS
- Website: www.csilizradvany.sk

Čiližská Radvaň (Hungarian: Csilizradvány, pronounced [ˈtʃilizrɒdvaːɲ]) is a village and municipality in the Dunajská Streda District in the Trnava Region of south-west Slovakia.

== Geography ==
The municipality lies at an altitude of 110 metres (360 ft) and covers an area of 21.41 km^{2} (8.27 sq mi) (2025).

== History ==
In the 9th century, the territory of Čiližská Radvaň became part of the Kingdom of Hungary. The first mention of the village is from 1252, when it is mentioned in the Zobor Abbey's land-registration as Villa Rodovan and Roduan. Until 1918, it belonged to Hungary. After the Austro-Hungarian army disintegrated in November 1918, Czechoslovak troops occupied the area. After the Treaty of Trianon of 1920, it became officially part of Czechoslovakia and fell within Bratislava County until 1927. In November 1938, the First Vienna Award granted the area to Hungary and it was held by Hungary until 1945. After Soviet occupation in 1945, Czechoslovak administration returned and the village became officially part of Czechoslovakia in 1947.

== Population ==
Population statistic (10 years)
Year	1995	2005	2015	2025
Count	1190	1258	1182	1148
Difference		+5.71%	−6.04%	−2.87%

Population statistic
Year	2024	2025
Count	1163	1148
Difference		−1.28%

It has a population of 1148 people (31 December 2025).

=== Ethnicity ===
Census 2021 (1+ %)
Ethnicity	Number	Fraction
Hungarian	1051	89.44%
Slovak	124	10.55%
Not found out	52	4.42%
Total	1175	

In year 2021 was 1175 people by ethnicity 1051 as Hungarian, 124 as Slovak, 52 as Not found out, 9 as Czech, 1 as Serbian, 1 as German and 1 as Other.

Note on population: The difference values of population numbers in the table "Population statistic" and in the sections "Ethnicity" & "Religion" is caused by the use of various statistical methods.

=== Religion ===
Census 2021 (1+ %)
Religion	Number	Fraction
Roman Catholic Church	374	31.83%
None	356	30.3%
Calvinist Church	315	26.81%
Not found out	69	5.87%
Evangelical Church	25	2.13%
Total	1175	

In year 2021 was 1175 people by religion 374 from Roman Catholic Church, 356 from None, 315 from Calvinist Church, 69 from Not found out, 25 from Evangelical Church, 10 from Christian Congregations in Slovakia, 9 from Jehovah's Witnesses, 6 from Greek Catholic Church, 3 from Buddhism, 2 from Other and not ascertained christian church, 2 from Other, 1 from Old Catholic Church, 1 from Islam, 1 from Seventh-day Adventist Church and 1 from Ad hoc movements.

According to the 2001 census, its total population was 1218, of whom 95,40% of the respondents reported themselves as Hungarian.

== Calvinist church ==
The church of the village was first mentioned in a local legend, according to which the wife of King Béla IV of Hungary, being chased by Tartars, allegedly gave birth to a baby in a hedge near this church. The child was said to be baptized in the church. After this occasion, the king gave a privilege for the inhabitants of Radvány according to which, on entering the church, villagers from Radvány were entitled to use a gate different from the one that people from other villages had to use.

Originally, the church was built in Romanesque style which is proved by the remains of murals. However in the registration made upon the order of cardinal Peter Pázmány in the 17th century, the church was mentioned as a gothic church. Since the reformation era, the church has belonged to the Calvinist community. The church was burned down and rebuilt several times. The last significant renovation took place in 1908 after a combustion when the church was rebuilt in neoclassical style. The current furniture in the church is composed of benches and the organ-loft made in neoclassical style, and the neobaroque pulpit. The furniture and the front-door were made by local masters. The church is being reconstructed at the moment. During these works a walled up door turned up again from under the old plaster.

== Twin towns – sister cities ==
Čiližská Radvaň is twinned with:

- Kisbajcs, Hungary
- Reci, Romania

== Gallery ==
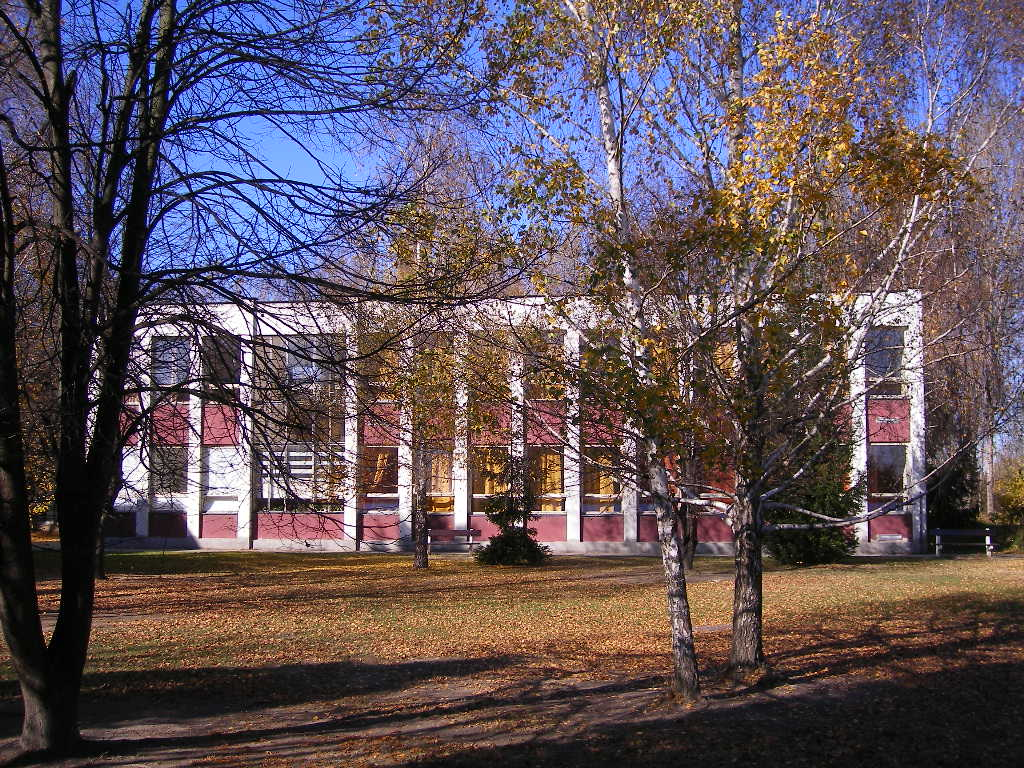
Primary school

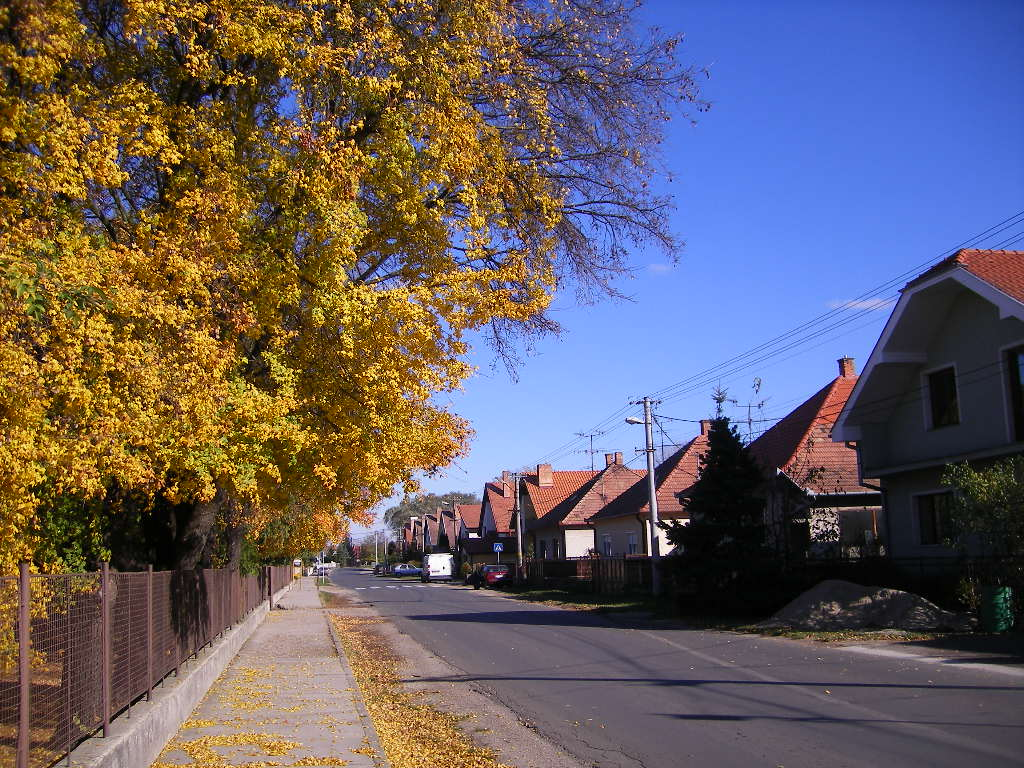
Street view

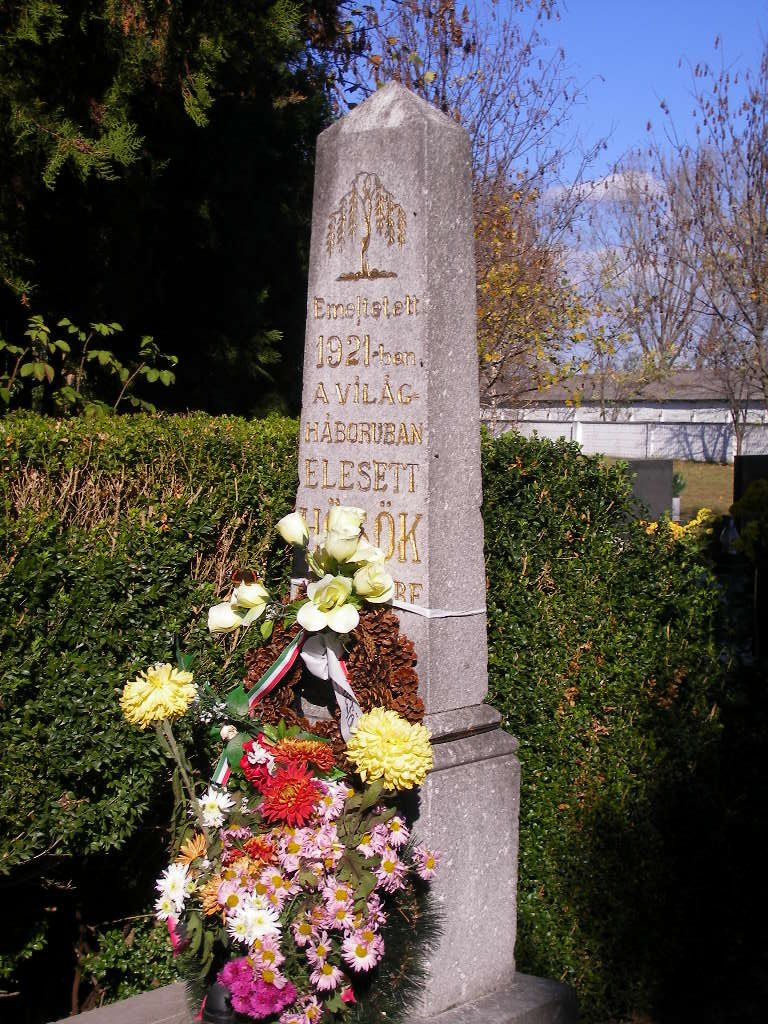
World War I heroes monument

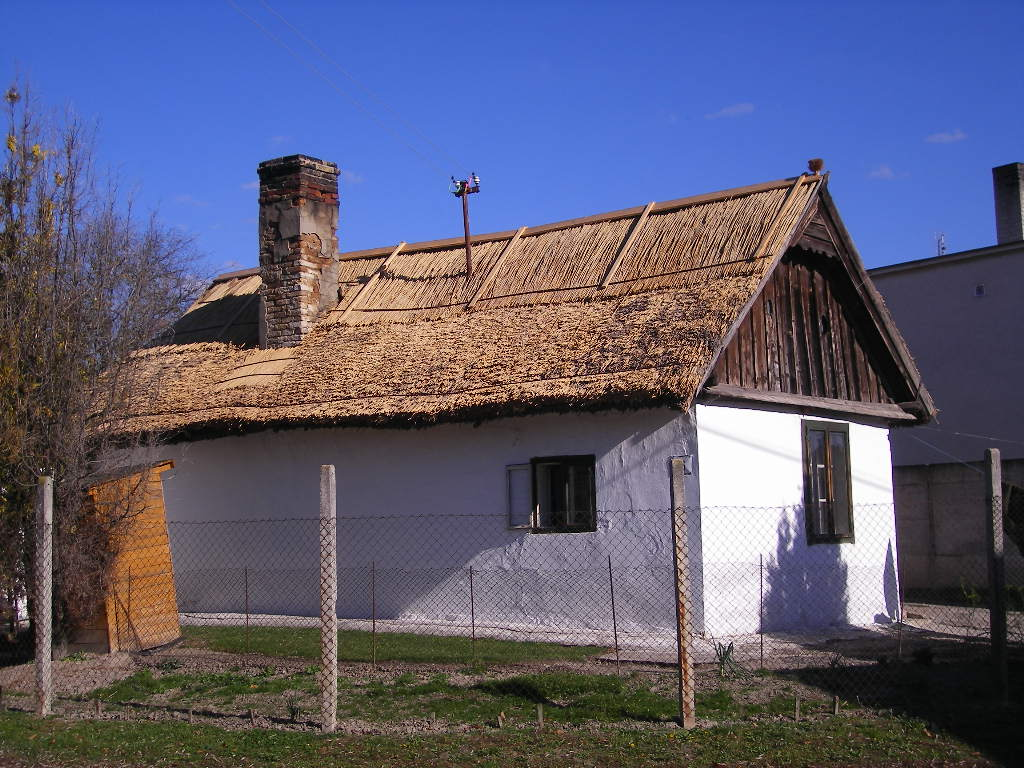
Reed thatched roof

== See also ==
- List of municipalities and towns in Slovakia

== Genealogical resources ==
The records for genealogical research are available at the state archive "Statny Archiv in Bratislava, Slovakia"

- Roman Catholic church records (births/marriages/deaths): 1872-1898 (parish B)
- Reformated church records (births/marriages/deaths): 1804-1902 (parish A)
