= Brateș =

Brateș Barátos
- Commune
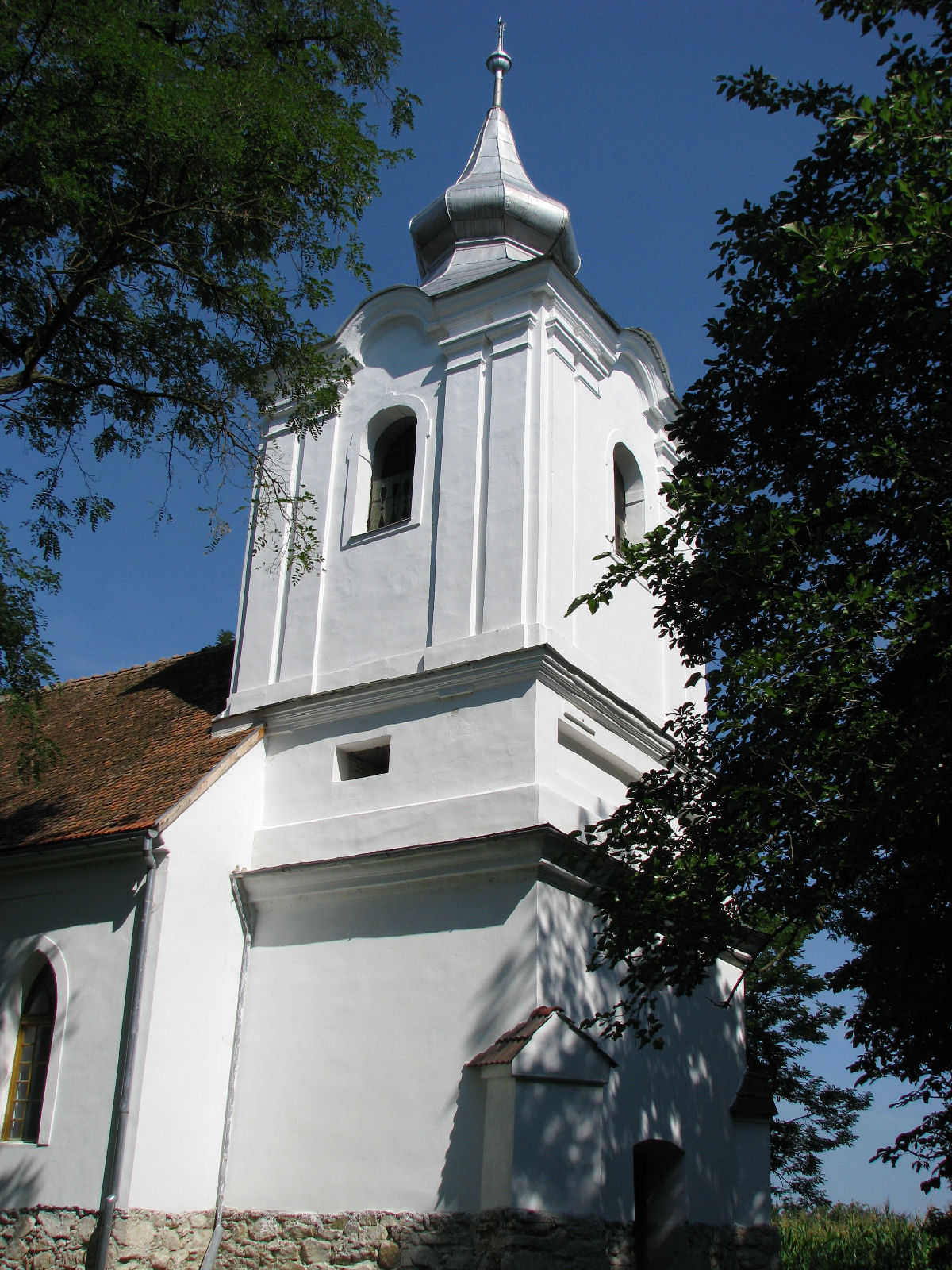
- Church in Brateș

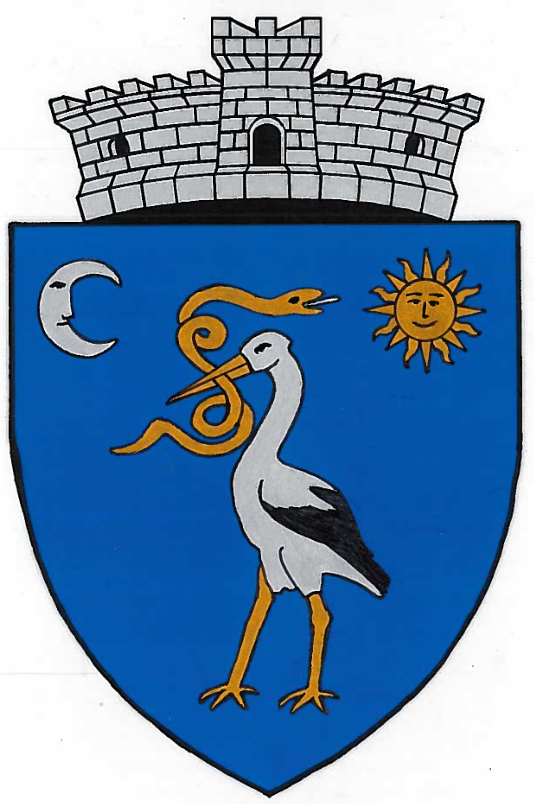
- Coat of arms

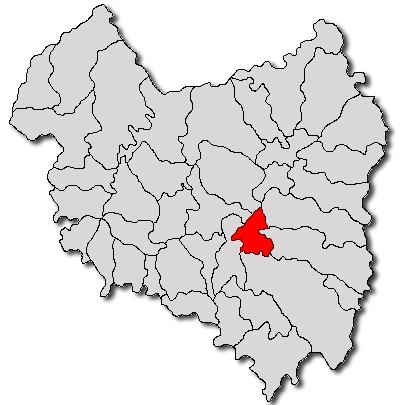
- Location in Covasna County

- Location in Romania
- Coordinates: 45°50′N 26°4′E
- Country: Romania
- County: Covasna

Government
  - Mayor (2020–2024): Ferenc-Szabolcs Tánczos (UDMR)
- Area: 33.92 km^{2} (13.10 sq mi)
- Elevation: 529 m (1,736 ft)
- Population (2021-12-01): 1,409
  - Density: 41.54/km^{2} (107.6/sq mi)
- Time zone: UTC+02:00 (EET)
  - Summer (DST): UTC+03:00 (EEST)
- Postal code: 527050
- Area code: (+40) 02 67
- Vehicle reg.: CV
- Website: web.baratos.ro

Brateș (Hungarian: Barátos, Hungarian pronunciation: [ˈbɒraːtoʃ]; German: Mönchsdorf) is a commune in Covasna County, Transylvania, Romania composed of three villages: Brateș, Pachia (Páké), and Telechia (Orbaitelek).

== Geography ==
The commune is located in the central part of Covasna County, 9.6 km (6 mi) west of the town of Covasna and 24 km (15 mi) east of the county seat, Sfântu Gheorghe. It lies at an altitude of 529 m (1,736 ft), on the banks of Râul Negru and its left tributary, the river Covasna; the river Păpăuți flows into the Covasna near Brateș.

Brateș is crossed by national road DN13E, which starts in Întorsura Buzăului, in the south of the county, passes through Covasna and Sfântu Gheorghe, and ends in Feldioara, 50 km (31 mi) to the west, in Brașov County.

== History ==
The settlement formed part of the Székely Land region of the historical Transylvania province. Until 1918, the village belonged to the Háromszék County of the Kingdom of Hungary. In the immediate aftermath of World War I, following the declaration of the Union of Transylvania with Romania, the area passed under Romanian administration during the Hungarian–Romanian War of 1918–1919. By the terms of the Treaty of Trianon of 1920, it became part of the Kingdom of Romania. In 1925, the commune fell in Plasa Covasna of Trei Scaune County. In August 1940, under the auspices of Nazi Germany, which imposed the Second Vienna Award, Hungary retook the territory of Northern Transylvania (which included Brateș) from Romania. Towards the end of World War II, however, the commune was taken back from Hungarian and German troops by Romanian and Soviet forces in September–October 1944. In 1950, after Communist Romania was established, Brateș became part of the Sfântu Gheorghe Raion of Stalin Region. From 1952 and 1960, it was part of the Magyar Autonomous Region, and between 1960 and 1968 it reverted to Brașov Region. In 1968, when Romania was reorganized based on counties rather than regions, the commune became part of Covasna County.

== Demographics ==
Historical population
Year	Pop.	±%
1850	2,244	—
1910	2,787	+24.2%
1966	2,182	−21.7%
2002	1,548	−29.1%
2011	1,531	−1.1%
2021	1,409	−8.0%
Source: Census data

The commune has an absolute Székely Hungarian majority. According to the 2002 census, it had a population of 1,548, of which 98.97% or 1,532 were Hungarians. At the 2011 census, Brateș had a population of 1,768, of which 96.93% were Székely Hungarians and 1.7% were Romanians. By the 2021 census, the number of inhabitants had decreased to 1,409, of which 94.82% were Székely Hungarians and 2.06% Romanians.
