= Barcani =

- Commune
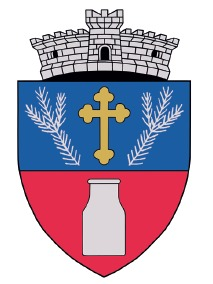
- Coat of arms

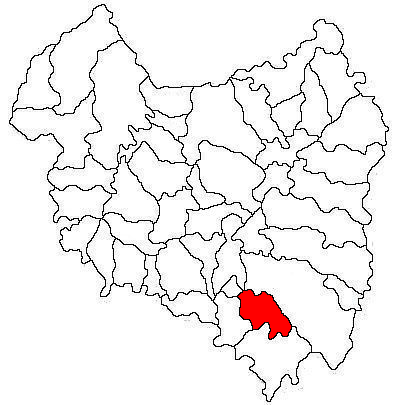
- Location in Covasna County

- Location in Romania
- Coordinates: 45°42′N 26°5′E
- Country: Romania
- County: Covasna

Government
  - Mayor (2020–2024): Nicolae Pastor (Ind.)
- Area: 57.40 km^{2} (22.16 sq mi)
- Elevation: 754 m (2,474 ft)
- Lowest elevation: 700 m (2,300 ft)
- Population (2021-12-01): 3,822
  - Density: 67/km^{2} (170/sq mi)
- Time zone: EET/EEST (UTC+2/+3)
- Postal code: 527010
- Area code: (+40) 02 67
- Vehicle reg.: CV
- Website: primariabarcani.ro

Barcani (Hungarian: Zágonbárkány) is a commune in Covasna County, in the geographical region of Transylvania, Romania. It is composed of three villages: Barcani, Lădăuți (Ladóc), and Sărămaș (Szaramás). It also included Valea Mare village before it was split off to form a separate commune in 1999. The commune is situated south of Zagon, in the southeastern part of Covasna County.

== Demographics ==
The commune has absolute ethnic Romanian majority. According to the 2002 census, it had a population of 3,836 of which 99.63% or 3,822 were Romanians and 14 or 0.36% Hungarian. At the 2011 census, there were 3,688 inhabitants; 95.53% were Romanians and 3.09% Roma. At the 2021 census, Barcani had a population of 3,822; of those, 86.39% were Romanians and 5.73% Roma.
