= Covasna inclined plane =

Standard-gauge railway system

Covasna's inclined plane (also called Șiclău) is a unique standard-gauge railway system used to carry logs by using gravity, without any other source of energy.

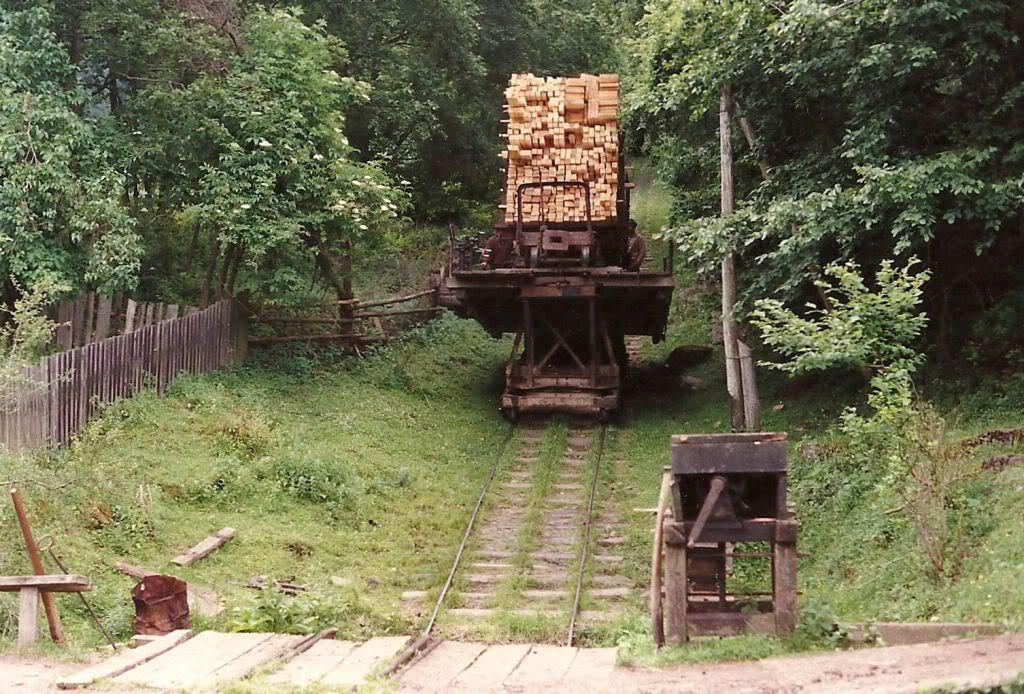
The inclined plane in 1994, five years before it was permanently closed

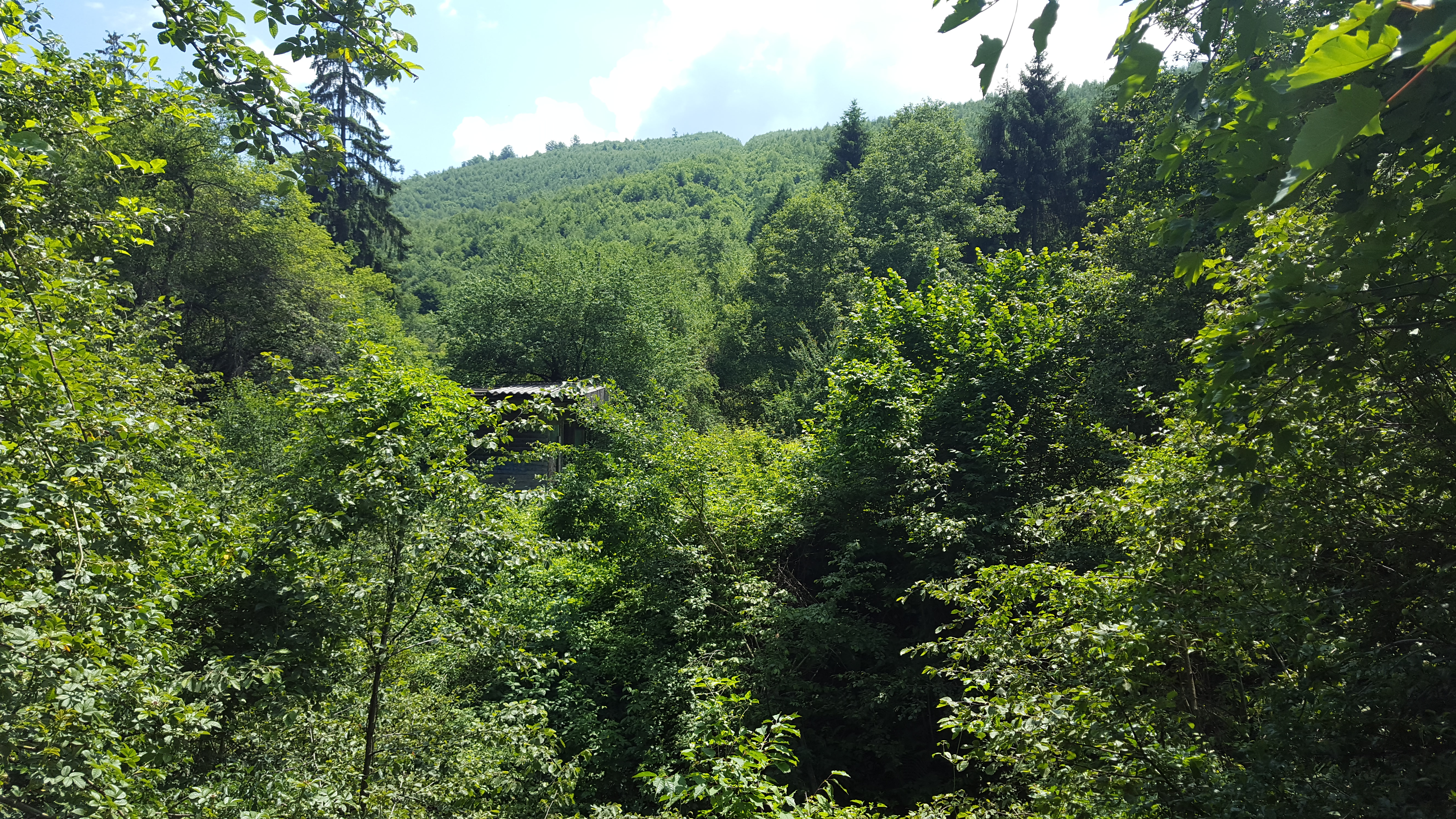
The inclined plane ran on the path that today is covered by trees with lower height, the wooden building being one of the abandoned operational stations (20 June 2018).

== History ==
Covasna's inclined plane (Șiclăul, as it is known locally), was designed by engineer Emil Lux in 1886, at the initiative of lumber mill owner David Horn near the border between the Austro-Hungarian Empire and Romania. The railway's main purpose was to increase wood supply and timber transportation. A narrow-gauge railway (760 mm) Comandău - Covasna was built between 1889 and 1891.

After two years Horn transferred the concession to forestry company Ardeleana, formerly Erdelyi Erdoipar RT. Ardeleana was founded in 1890 and was owned by Groedel brothers. This company built nine railway systems covering a total of 118.3 km. To enable the connection between Valea Zânelor (Fairy's Valley) and Șiclău, the Inclined Plane was inaugurated in 1890. The components were manufactured by Viennese firm Obach. The Inclined Plane was used every day for over a century (1892-1995). It transported approximately 30 cars daily, each having the capacity of 10m^{3} of wood.

In 1995, only a few years after celebrating its centenary, the Inclined Plane underwent a series of unfortunate events when a powerful storm toppled almost all the nearby trees. In addition, in 1997 the top control station was destroyed by fire. A drastic reduction in wood volumes ended the Inclined Plane on 1 October 1999 (along with 32 km of railway that formed the last remains of the forestry railways system from Comandău).

== Operation ==
The train operated by allowing the weight of a loaded train to pull a lighter, empty train up the slope. A metal cable connected the two trains. Operation was controlled from the control room located in the top station. Trains ran on a normal track gauge (1435 mm). In the middle of the route a branch allowed the simultaneous passage of the wagons.
