= Estelnic =

Estelnic Esztelnek
- Commune
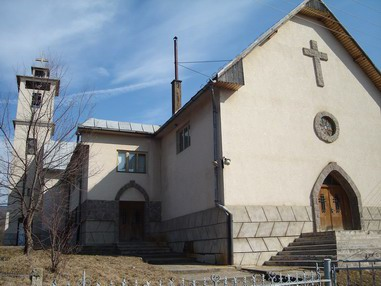
- Franciscan Church

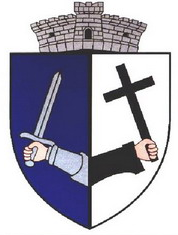
- Coat of arms

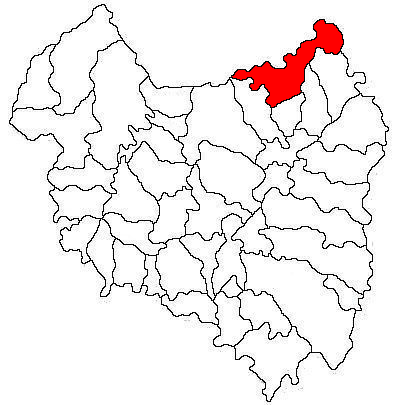
- Location in Covasna County

- Location in Romania
- Coordinates: 46°6′N 26°13′E
- Country: Romania
- County: Covasna

Government
  - Mayor (2020–2024): Balázs Salamon (AMT)
- Area: 93.10 km^{2} (35.95 sq mi)
- Elevation: 620 m (2,030 ft)
- Population (2021-12-01): 1,111
  - Density: 11.93/km^{2} (30.91/sq mi)
- Time zone: UTC+02:00 (EET)
  - Summer (DST): UTC+03:00 (EEST)
- Postal code: 527143
- Area code: (+40) 02 67
- Vehicle reg.: CV
- Website: estelnic.ro

Estelnic (Hungarian: Esztelnek, Hungarian pronunciation: [ˈɛstɛlnɛk]) is a commune in Covasna County, Transylvania, Romania. It became an independent commune when it split from Poian in 2005. The commune is composed of three villages: Cărpinenii (Csángótelep), Estelnic, and Valea Scurtă (Kurtapatak).

== History ==
The locality formed part of the Székely Land region of the historical Transylvania province. Until 1918, the village belonged to the Háromszék County of the Kingdom of Hungary. In the immediate aftermath of World War I, following the declaration of the Union of Transylvania with Romania, the area passed under Romanian administration, during the Hungarian–Romanian War (1918–1919). By the terms of the Treaty of Trianon of 1920, it became part of the Kingdom of Romania. In 1925, the commune fell in Plasa Târgu Secuiesc of Trei Scaune County.

In August 1940, under the auspices of Nazi Germany, which imposed the Second Vienna Award, Hungary retook the territory of Northern Transylvania (which included Estelnic) from Romania. Towards the end of World War II, however, the commune was taken back from Hungarian and German troops by Romanian and Soviet forces in September–October 1944. In 1950, after Communist Romania was established, Estelnic became part of the Târgu Secuiesc Raion of Stalin Region. From 1952 and 1960, it was part of the Magyar Autonomous Region, and between 1960 and 1968 it reverted to Brașov Region. In 1968, when Romania was reorganized based on counties rather than regions, the commune became part of Covasna County.

== Demographics ==
Historical population
Year	Pop.	±%
1850	1,581	—
1941	1,829	+15.7%
1966	1,576	−13.8%
2002	1,133	−28.1%
2011	1,182	+4.3%
2021	1,111	−6.0%
Source: Census data

The commune has an absolute Székely Hungarian majority. According to the 2011 census, it had a population of 1,182, of which 97.29% or 1,150 were Hungarians. At the 2021 census, Estelnic had a population of 1,111; of those, 91.18% were Hungarians, 6.03% Roma, and 1.35% Romanians.
