= Poian =

Poian Kézdiszentkereszt
- Commune
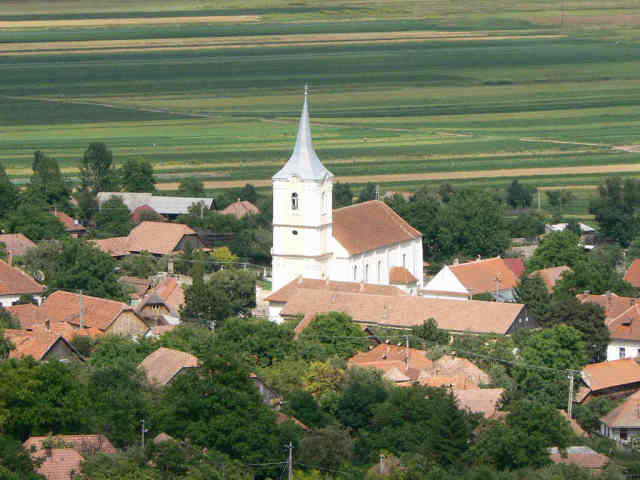
- View of Poian

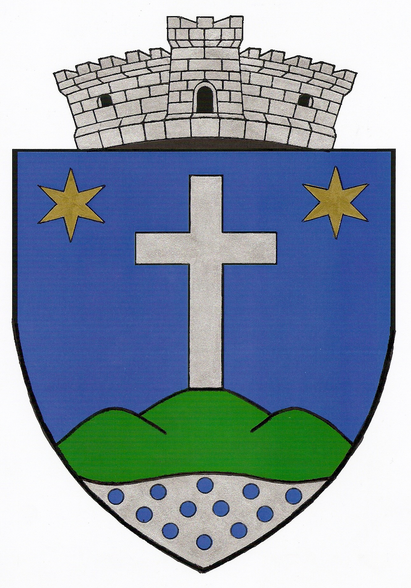
- Coat of arms

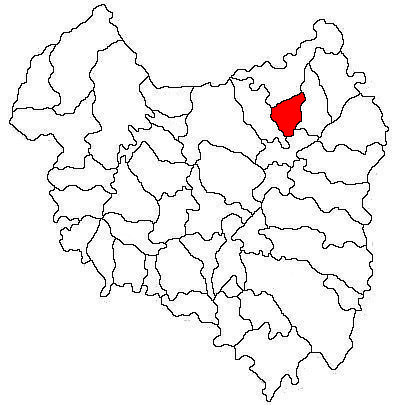
- Location in Covasna County

- Location in Romania
- Coordinates: 46°4′N 26°9′E
- Country: Romania
- County: Covasna

Government
  - Mayor (2020–2024): Endre Páll (UDMR)
- Area: 59.26 km^{2} (22.88 sq mi)
- Elevation: 610 m (2,000 ft)
- Population (2021-12-01): 1,647
  - Density: 27.79/km^{2} (71.98/sq mi)
- Time zone: UTC+02:00 (EET)
  - Summer (DST): UTC+03:00 (EEST)
- Postal code: 527140
- Area code: (+40) 02 67
- Vehicle reg.: CV
- Website: kezdiszentkereszt.ro

Poian (Hungarian: Kézdiszentkereszt, Hungarian pronunciation: [ˈkeːzdisɛntkɛrɛst]) is a commune in Covasna County, Transylvania, Romania composed of two villages: Belani (Bélafalva) and Poian. In 2005, Estelnic, along with two other villages, broke away from Poian to form an independent commune.

The commune is located in the northeastern part of Covasna County, 9 km (5.6 mi) north of Târgu Secuiesc and 44 km (27 mi) northeast of the county seat, Sfântu Gheorghe.

== History ==
The settlement formed part of the Székely Land region of the historical Transylvania province. Until 1918, the village belonged to the Háromszék County of the Kingdom of Hungary. In the immediate aftermath of World War I, following the declaration of the Union of Transylvania with Romania, the area passed under Romanian administration, during the Hungarian–Romanian War (1918–1919). By the terms of the Treaty of Trianon of 1920, it became part of the Kingdom of Romania. In 1925, the commune fell in Plasa Târgu Secuiesc of Trei Scaune County. In August 1940, under the auspices of Nazi Germany, which imposed the Second Vienna Award, Hungary retook the territory of Northern Transylvania (which included Poian) from Romania. Towards the end of World War II, however, the commune was taken back from Hungarian and German troops by Romanian and Soviet forces in September–October 1944. In 1950, after Communist Romania was established, Poiani became part of the Târgu Secuiesc Raion of Stalin Region. From 1952 and 1960, it was part of the Magyar Autonomous Region, and between 1960 and 1968 it reverted to Brașov Region. In 1968, when Romania was reorganized based on counties rather than regions, the commune became part of Covasna County.

== Demographics ==
Historical population
Year	Pop.	±%
1850	2,261	—
1941	2,718	+20.2%
1966	2,113	−22.3%
2002	1,804	−14.6%
2011	1,768	−2.0%
2021	1,647	−6.8%
Source: Census data

The commune has an absolute Székely Hungarian majority. According to the 2002 census, it had a population of 1,804, of which 99.43% were Hungarians. At the 2011 census, Poian had a population of 1,768, of which 98.7% were Székely Hungarians. At the 2021 census, the number of inhabitants had decreased to 1,647, of which 95.87% were Székely Hungarians.
