= Păpăuți (river) =

- Location within Romania

Location
- Country: Romania
- Counties: Covasna County
- Villages: Păpăuți

Physical characteristics
- Mouth: Covasna
  - coordinates: 45.8185°N 26.1015°E
- Length: 13 km (8.1 mi)
- Basin size: 49 km^{2} (19 sq mi)

Basin features
- Progression: Covasna→ Râul Negru→ Olt→ Danube→ Black Sea
- Tributaries
  - right: Chiuruș

The Păpăuți is a tributary of the river Covasna in Romania. It flows into the Covasna near Brateș. Its length is 13 km (8.1 mi) and its basin size is 49 km^{2} (19 sq mi).
