= Zagon, Covasna =

Zagon Zágon
- Commune
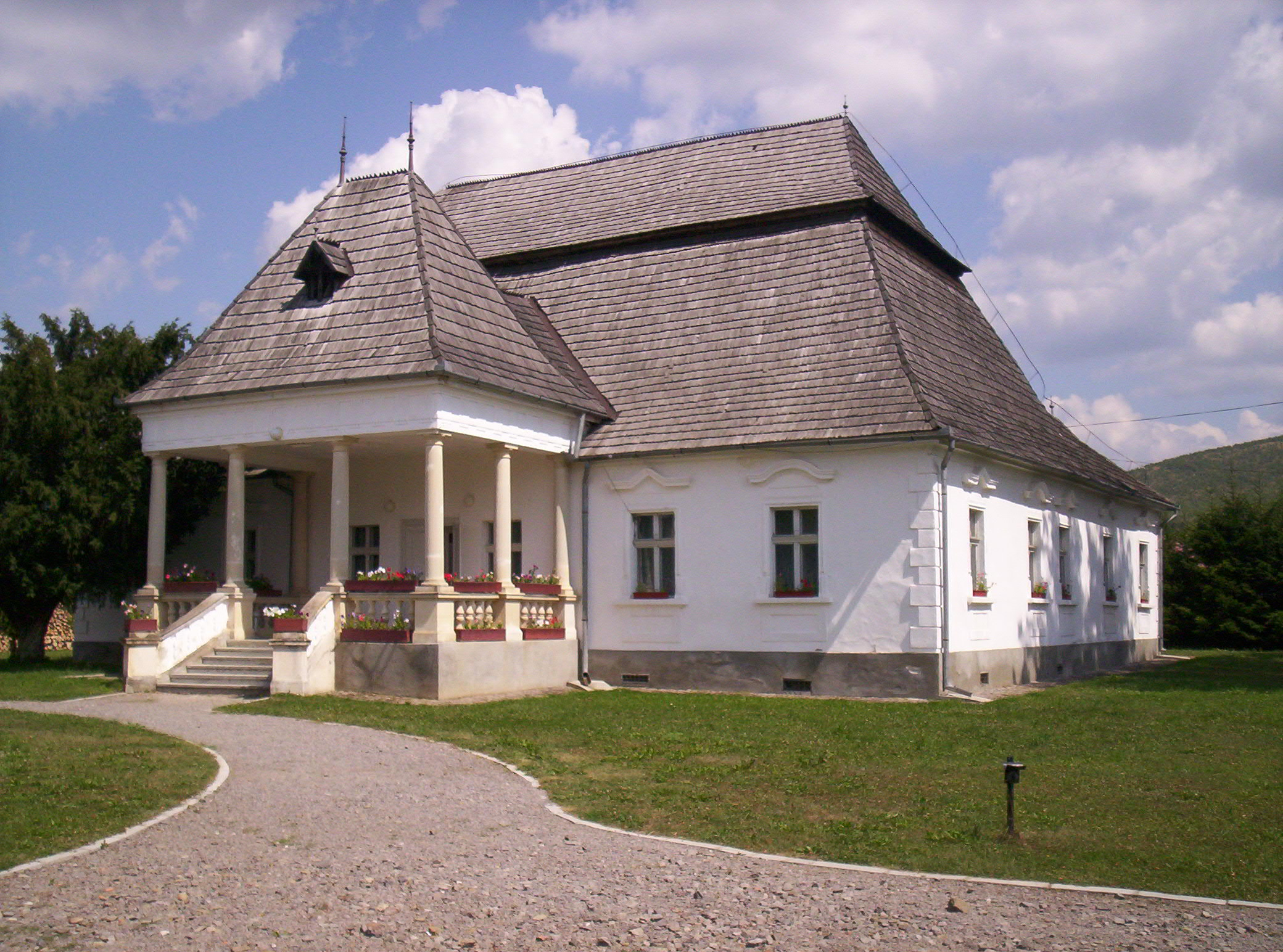
- Mikes-Szentkereszty manor-house

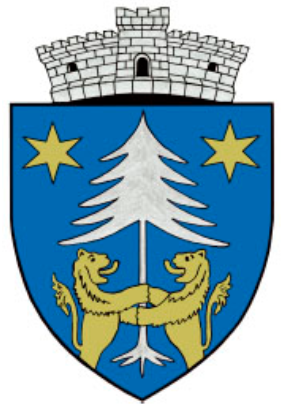
- Coat of arms

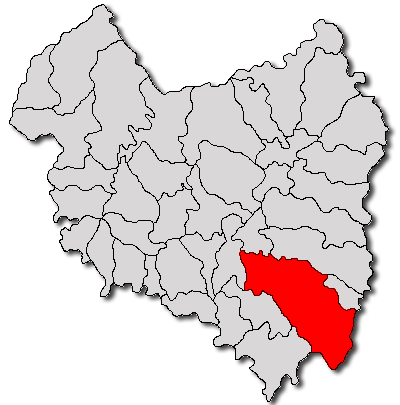
- Location in Covasna County

- Location in Romania
- Coordinates: 45°46′N 26°7′E
- Country: Romania
- County: Covasna

Government
  - Mayor (2020–2024): Augustin Kiss (UDMR)
- Area: 290.65 km^{2} (112.22 sq mi)
- Elevation: 517 m (1,696 ft)
- Population (2021-12-01): 4,924
  - Density: 16.94/km^{2} (43.88/sq mi)
- Time zone: UTC+02:00 (EET)
  - Summer (DST): UTC+03:00 (EEST)
- Postal code: 527185
- Vehicle reg.: CV
- Website: comunazagon.ro

Zagon (Hungarian: Zágon, Hungarian pronunciation: [ˈzaːɡon]) is a commune in Covasna County, Transylvania, Romania composed of two villages: Păpăuți (Papolc) and Zagon.

== Geography ==
The commune is located in the southeastern part of the county, on the border with Buzău County, 15 km (9.3 mi) south of the town of Covasna and 40 km (25 mi) east of the county seat, Sfântu Gheorghe. It is situated at an altitude of 517 m (1,696 ft) at the foot of the Vrancea Mountains, on the banks of the rivers Zagon and Păpăuți.

Zagon is crossed by national road DN13E, which starts in Întorsura Buzăului, in the south of the county, passes through Covasna and Sfântu Gheorghe, and ends in Feldioara, 58 km (36 mi) to the west, in Brașov County.

== History ==
The locality formed part of the Székely Land region of the historical Transylvania province. From 1876 until 1920, the village belonged to the Háromszék County of the Kingdom of Hungary. In the immediate aftermath of World War I, following the declaration of the Union of Transylvania with Romania, the area passed under Romanian administration during the Hungarian–Romanian War of 1918–1919. By the terms of the Treaty of Trianon of 1920, it became part of the Kingdom of Romania.

In 1925, the commune fell within Plasa Covasna of Trei Scaune County. In August 1940, under the auspices of Nazi Germany, which imposed the Second Vienna Award, Hungary retook the territory of Northern Transylvania (which included Zagon) from Romania. Towards the end of World War II, however, the commune was taken back from Hungarian and German troops by Romanian and Soviet forces in September 1944.

In 1950, after Communist Romania was established, Zagon became part of the Târgu Secuiesc Raion of Stalin Region. From 1952 and 1960, it was part of the Magyar Autonomous Region, and between 1960 and 1968 it reverted to Brașov Region. In 1968, when Romania was reorganized based on counties rather than regions, the commune became part of Covasna County.

== Demographics ==
Historical population
Year	Pop.	±%
1850	4,636	—
1920	8,439	+82.0%
1941	5,790	−31.4%
2002	5,489	−5.2%
2011	5,282	−3.8%
2021	4,924	−6.8%
Source: Census data

The commune is ethnically mixed. According to the 2011 census, it had a population of 5,185, of which 51.3% were Székely Hungarians and 48.6% Romanians. At the 2021 census, Zagon had a population of 4,924, of which 46.32% were Romanians and 45.96% Székely Hungarians.

== Natives ==
- Kelemen Mikes (1690–1761), Hungarian political figure and essayist
- Ecaterina Szabo (born 1967), gold medalist gymnast at the 1984 Olympics
