= Reci =

Reci Réty
- Commune
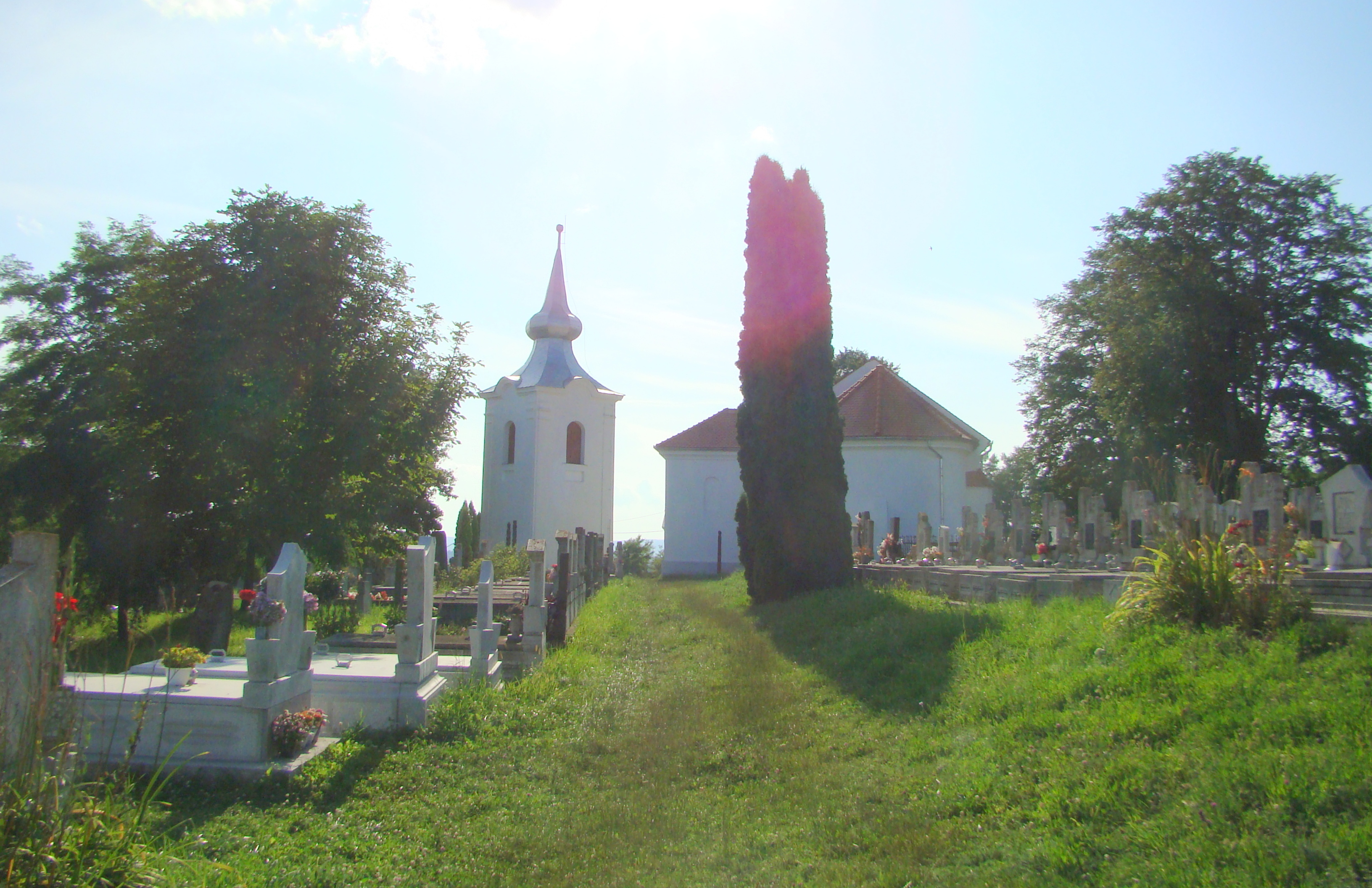
- Reformed church in Reci

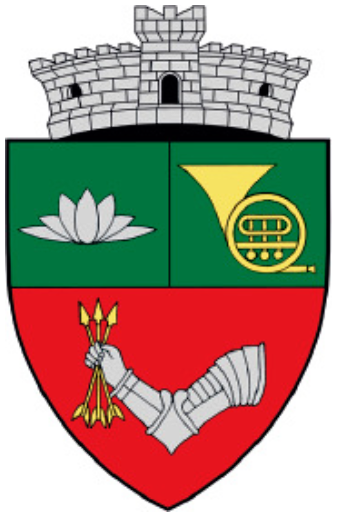
- Coat of arms

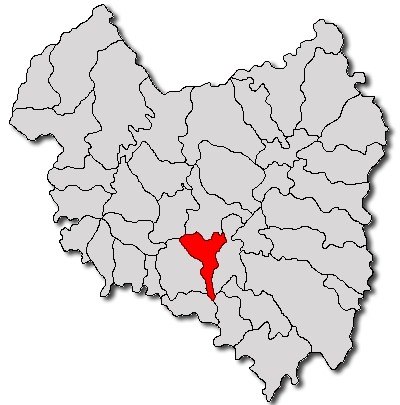
- Location in Covasna County

- Location in Romania
- Coordinates: 45°51′N 25°56′E
- Country: Romania
- County: Covasna

Government
  - Mayor (2020–2024): Lehel-Lajos Dombora (UDMR)
- Area: 39.92 km^{2} (15.41 sq mi)
- Elevation: 548 m (1,798 ft)
- Population (2021-12-01): 2,259
  - Density: 56.59/km^{2} (146.6/sq mi)
- Time zone: UTC+02:00 (EET)
  - Summer (DST): UTC+03:00 (EEST)
- Postal code: 527145
- Area code: (+40) 02 67
- Vehicle reg.: CV
- Website: reci.ro

Reci (Hungarian: Réty, Hungarian pronunciation: [ˈreːc]) is a commune in Covasna County, Transylvania, Romania composed of four villages: Aninoasa (Egerpatak), Bita (Bita), Reci, and Saciova (Szacsva). It also included the village of Comolău (Komolló) until 1968, when it was disestablished.

== Geography ==
The commune is situated in the Brașov Depression, in the historical Székely Land region of southeastern Transylvania. It is positioned southeast of the Bodoc Mountains, at an altitude of 548 m (1,798 ft), on the banks of the Râul Negru and its tributaries, the rivers Covasna and Pădureni.

Reci is located in the southern part of Covasna County, in between the county seat, Sfântu Gheorghe, 13 km (8.1 mi) to the west, the town of Covasna, 22 km (14 mi) to the east, and the city of Târgu Secuiesc, 27 km (17 mi) to the northeast. It is crossed by national road DN13E, which starts in Întorsura Buzăului, at the southern limit of the county, passes through Covasna and Sfântu Gheorghe, and ends in Feldioara, 38 km (24 mi) to the west, in Brașov County. At the western end of the commune is the DN11 road (part of European route E574), which starts in Brașov, passes through Târgu Secuiesc and Onești, and ends in Bacău. The Bita train station serves the CFR Line 404, which connects Sfântu Gheorghe to Covasna.

== History ==
A Roman settlement (the Castra of Reci) was discovered in Comolău village (now part of Reci); dating from the 4th century, the castra belonged to the Sântana de Mureș culture. A settlement and a grave from the 10th–11th centuries were discovered on the right bank of the Râul Negru. Until 1918, the village belonged to the Háromszék County of Austro-Hungary. In the immediate aftermath of World War I, following the declaration of the Union of Transylvania with Romania, the area passed under Romanian administration during the Hungarian–Romanian War of 1918–1919. By the terms of the Treaty of Trianon of 1920, it became part of the Kingdom of Romania.

In 1925, the commune fell within Plasa Covasna of Trei Scaune County. In August 1940, under the auspices of Nazi Germany, which imposed the Second Vienna Award, Hungary retook the territory of Northern Transylvania (which included Reci) from Romania. Towards the end of World War II, however, the commune was taken back from Hungarian and German troops by Romanian and Soviet forces in September 1944. In 1950, after Communist Romania was established, Reci became part of the Târgu Secuiesc Raion of Stalin Region. From 1952 and 1960, it was part of the Magyar Autonomous Region, and between 1960 and 1968 it reverted to Brașov Region. In 1968, when Romania was reorganized based on counties rather than regions, Reci became part of Covasna County.

== Demographics ==
Historical population
Year	Pop.	±%
1850	2,497	—
1941	2,857	+14.4%
2002	2,234	−21.8%
2011	2,304	+3.1%
2021	2,259	−2.0%
Source: Census data

The commune has an absolute Székely Hungarian majority. According to the 2002 census, it had a population of 2,234, of which 98.88% or 2,209 were Hungarians. At the 2021 census, Reci had 2,259 inhabitants; of those, 94.07% were Hungarians and 2.7% Romanians.

== Natives ==
- Imre Dimény (1922 – 2017), Hungarian agrarian engineer and Communist politician

== Twin towns ==
- Hungary: Abony
- Slovakia: Čiližská Radvaň
