= Mereni, Covasna =

Mereni Kézdialmás
- Commune
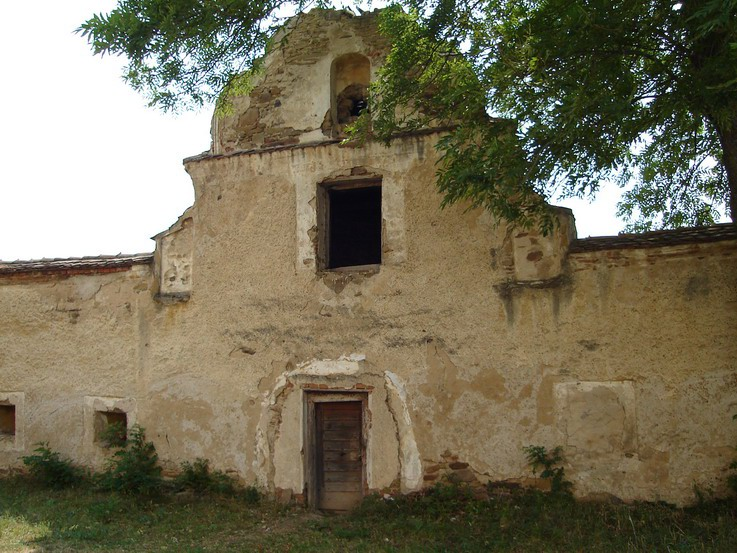
- The Castle Wall

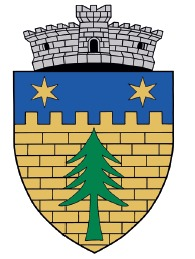
- Coat of arms

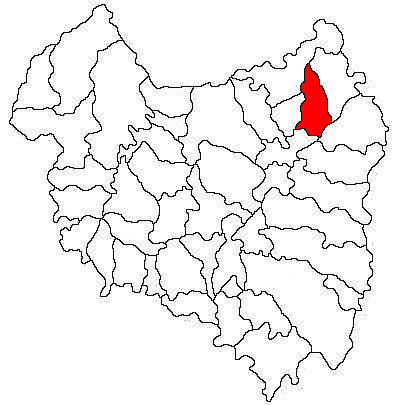
- Location in Covasna County

- Location in Romania
- Coordinates: 46°5′N 26°14′E
- Country: Romania
- County: Covasna

Government
  - Mayor (2020–2024): István Molnár (UDMR)
- Area: 51.96 km^{2} (20.06 sq mi)
- Elevation: 607 m (1,991 ft)
- Population (2021-12-01): 1,268
  - Density: 24.40/km^{2} (63.20/sq mi)
- Time zone: UTC+02:00 (EET)
  - Summer (DST): UTC+03:00 (EEST)
- Postal code: 527112
- Area code: (+40) 02 67
- Vehicle reg.: CV
- Website: kezdialmas.ro

Mereni (Hungarian: Kézdialmás, Hungarian pronunciation: [ˈkeːzdiɒlmaːʃ]) is a commune in Covasna County, Transylvania, Romania composed of two villages: Lutoasa (Csomortán) and Mereni.

== Demographics ==
Historical population
Year	Pop.	±%
1850	1,623	—
1930	1,893	+16.6%
1977	1,715	−9.4%
2002	1,410	−17.8%
2011	1,324	−6.1%
2021	1,268	−4.2%
Source: Census data

The commune has an absolute Székely Hungarian majority. According to the 2011 census, it had a population of 1,324, of which 96.68% were Hungarians and 1.36% Romanians. At to the 2021 census, Mereni had a population of 1,268, of which 95.98% were Hungarians and 1.5% Romanians.
