= Belin, Covasna =

Belin Bölön
- Commune
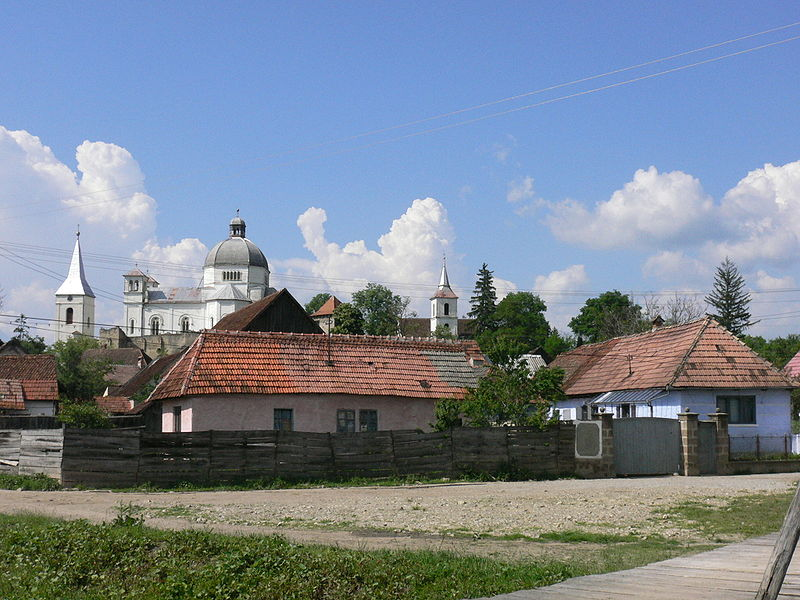
- The Unitarian Castle Church and the Reformed Church

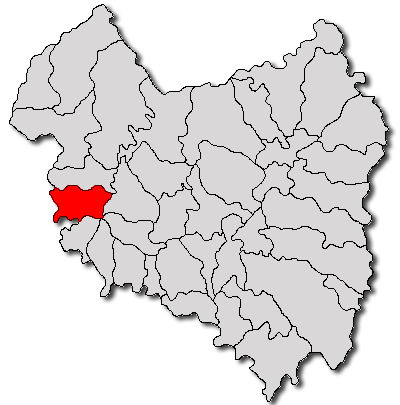
- Location in Covasna County

- Location in Romania
- Coordinates: 45°56′N 25°34′E
- Country: Romania
- County: Covasna

Government
  - Mayor (2020–2024): Imre Sikó (UDMR)
- Area: 70.7 km^{2} (27.3 sq mi)
- Elevation: 485 m (1,591 ft)
- Population (2021-12-01): 3,181
  - Density: 45.0/km^{2} (117/sq mi)
- Time zone: UTC+02:00 (EET)
  - Summer (DST): UTC+03:00 (EEST)
- Postal code: 527030
- Area code: +(40) x67
- Vehicle reg.: CV
- Website: primariabelin.ro

Belin (Hungarian: Bölön, Hungarian pronunciation: [bøløn]; German: Blumendorf) is a commune in Covasna County, Transylvania, Romania composed of two villages: Belin and Belin-Vale (Bölönpatak).

== Demographics ==
Belin has a relative Roma majority. At the 2021 census, it had a population of 3,181; of those, 38.98% were Roma, 29.27% Romanians, and 27.32% Székely Hungarians. At the 2011 census, there were 2,859 inhabitants; 46.9% of those were Roma, 36.7% Hungarians, and 13.7% Romanians.

In 2002, 33.4% of inhabitants were Pentecostal, 30.2% Unitarian, 19.8% Romanian Orthodox, 9.7% Reformed, 3.1% belonged to another religion, 1.3% had no religion, and 1.1% were Roman Catholic.
