= Dalnic =

Dalnic Dálnok
- Commune
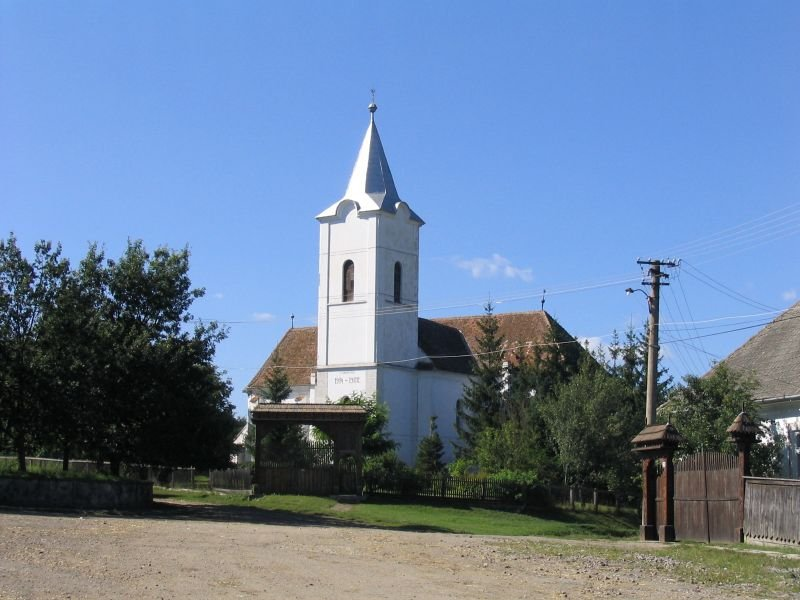
- Reformed Church

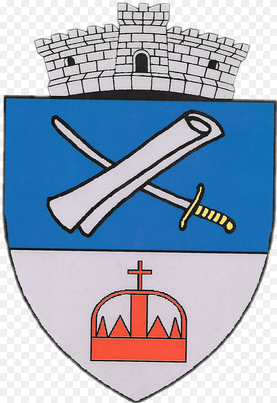
- Coat of arms

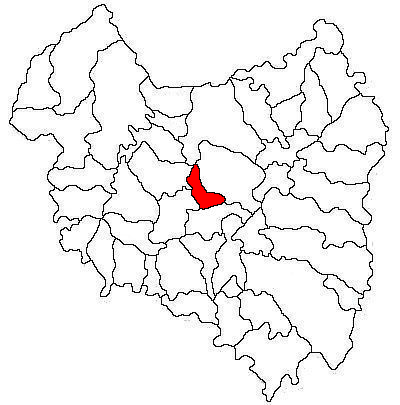
- Location in Covasna County

- Location in Romania
- Coordinates: 45°55′N 25°59′E
- Country: Romania
- County: Covasna

Government
  - Mayor (2020–2024): István Marti (UDMR)
- Area: 51.62 km^{2} (19.93 sq mi)
- Elevation: 589 m (1,932 ft)
- Population (2021-12-01): 896
  - Density: 17.4/km^{2} (45.0/sq mi)
- Time zone: UTC+02:00 (EET)
  - Summer (DST): UTC+03:00 (EEST)
- Postal code: 527121
- Area code: (+40) 02 67
- Vehicle reg.: CV
- Website: dalnic.ro

Dalnic (Hungarian: Dálnok, Hungarian pronunciation: [ˈdaːlnok]) is a commune in Covasna County, Transylvania, Romania. Composed of a single village, Dalnic, it became an independent commune when it split from Moacșa in 2004.

== Geography ==
The commune is situated in the southeastern foothills of the Bodoc Mountains in the Eastern Carpathians, at an altitude of 589 m (1,932 ft), on the banks of the river Dalnic. It is located in the center of Covasna County, 17 km (11 mi) southwest of Târgu Secuiesc and 22 km (14 mi) northeast of the county seat, Sfântu Gheorghe.

Dalnic is crossed on its south side by national road DN11 (part of European route E574), which starts in Brașov, passes through Târgu Secuiesc and Onești, and ends in Bacău.

== History ==
György Dózsa (1470–1514) a Székely man-at-arms set out from here in 1514 on the crusade announced by cardinal Tamás Bakócz which ended up in a peasant war. The village formed part of the Székely Land region of the historical Transylvania province. Until 1918, it belonged to the Háromszék County of the Kingdom of Hungary. In the immediate aftermath of World War I, following the declaration of the Union of Transylvania with Romania, the area passed under Romanian administration during the Hungarian–Romanian War of 1918–1919. By the terms of the Treaty of Trianon of 1920, it became part of the Kingdom of Romania.

In 1925, the commune fell within Plasa Târgu Secuiesc of Trei Scaune County. In August 1940, under the auspices of Nazi Germany, which imposed the Second Vienna Award, Hungary retook the territory of Northern Transylvania (which included Dalnic) from Romania. Towards the end of World War II, however, the commune was taken back from Hungarian and German troops by Romanian and Soviet forces in September 1944. In 1950, after Communist Romania was established, Dalnic became part of the Târgu Secuiesc Raion of Stalin Region. From 1952 and 1960, it was part of the Magyar Autonomous Region, and between 1960 and 1968 it reverted to Brașov Region. In 1968, when Romania was reorganized based on counties rather than regions, the commune became part of Covasna County.

== Demographics ==
Historical population
Year	Pop.	±%
1850	1,570	—
1930	1,230	−21.7%
2002	1,026	−16.6%
2011	956	−6.8%
2021	896	−6.3%
Source: Census data

The commune has an absolute Székely Hungarian majority. According to the 2011 census, it had a population of 956, of which 97.59% or 933 were Hungarians. At the 2021 census, Dalnic had a population of 896; of those, 98.1% were Hungarians.
