= Aita Mare =

Aita Mare Nagyajta
- Commune
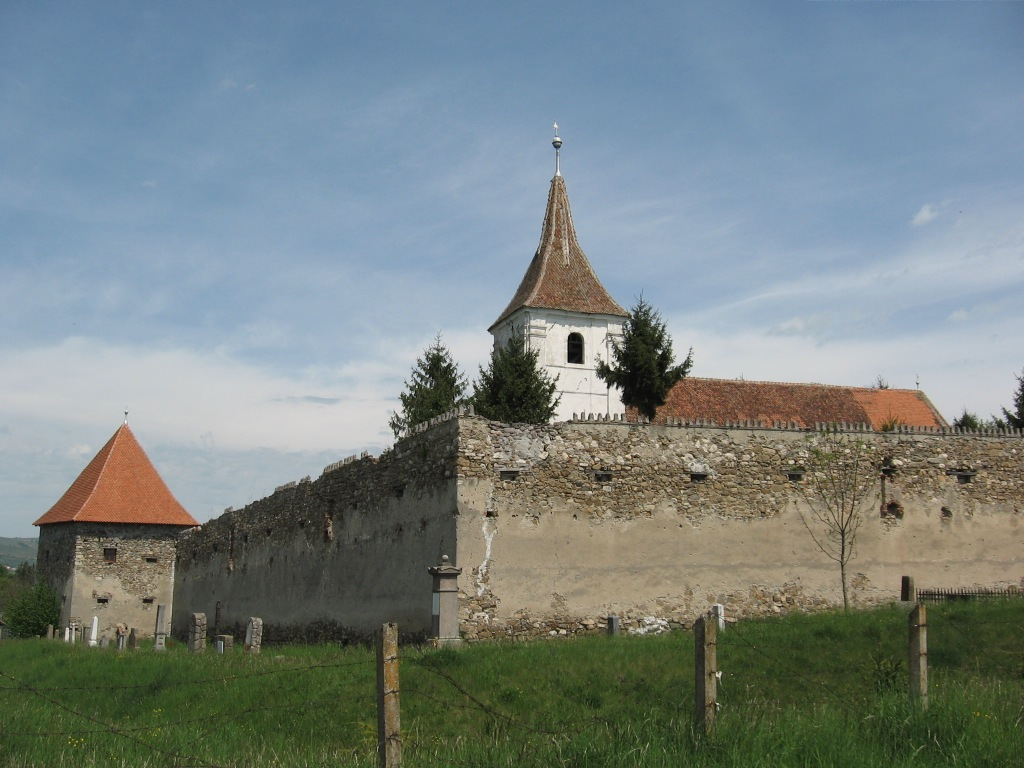

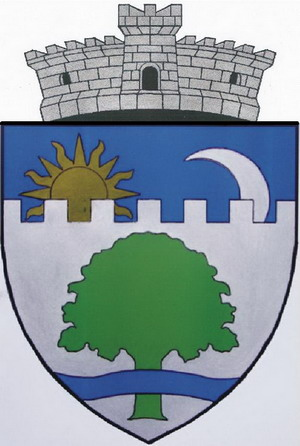
- Coat of arms

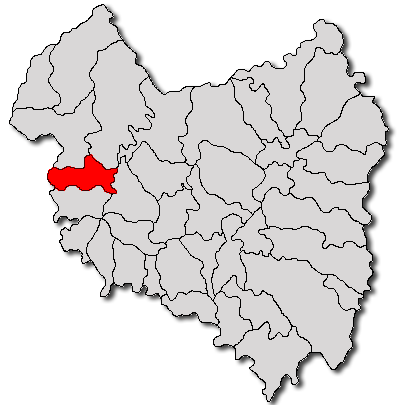
- Location in Covasna County

- Location in Romania
- Coordinates: 45°58′N 25°33′E
- Country: Romania
- County: Covasna

Government
  - Mayor (2020–2024): Edömér Bihari (UDMR)
- Area: 67.97 km^{2} (26.24 sq mi)
- Elevation: 476 m (1,562 ft)
- Population (2021-12-01): 1,626
  - Density: 23.92/km^{2} (61.96/sq mi)
- Time zone: UTC+02:00 (EET)
  - Summer (DST): UTC+03:00 (EEST)
- Postal code: 527005
- Area code: (+40) 02 67
- Vehicle reg.: CV
- Website: primariaaitamare.ro

Aita Mare (Hungarian: Nagyajta, Hungarian pronunciation: [nɒɟɒjtɒ]; German: Aitau) is a commune in Covasna County, Transylvania, Romania, composed of two villages: Aita Mare and Aita Medie (Középajta).

The commune is located in the western part of the county, on the border with Brașov County. It formed part of the Székely Land region of the historical Transylvania province.

== Demographics ==
The commune has an absolute Székely Hungarian majority. At the 2011 census, Aita Mare had a population of 1,715, of which 90.15% were Hungarian and 8.8% Romanian. At the 2021 census, the commune had a population of 1,626, of which 90.65% were Hungarian and 7.63% Romanian.

== Gallery ==
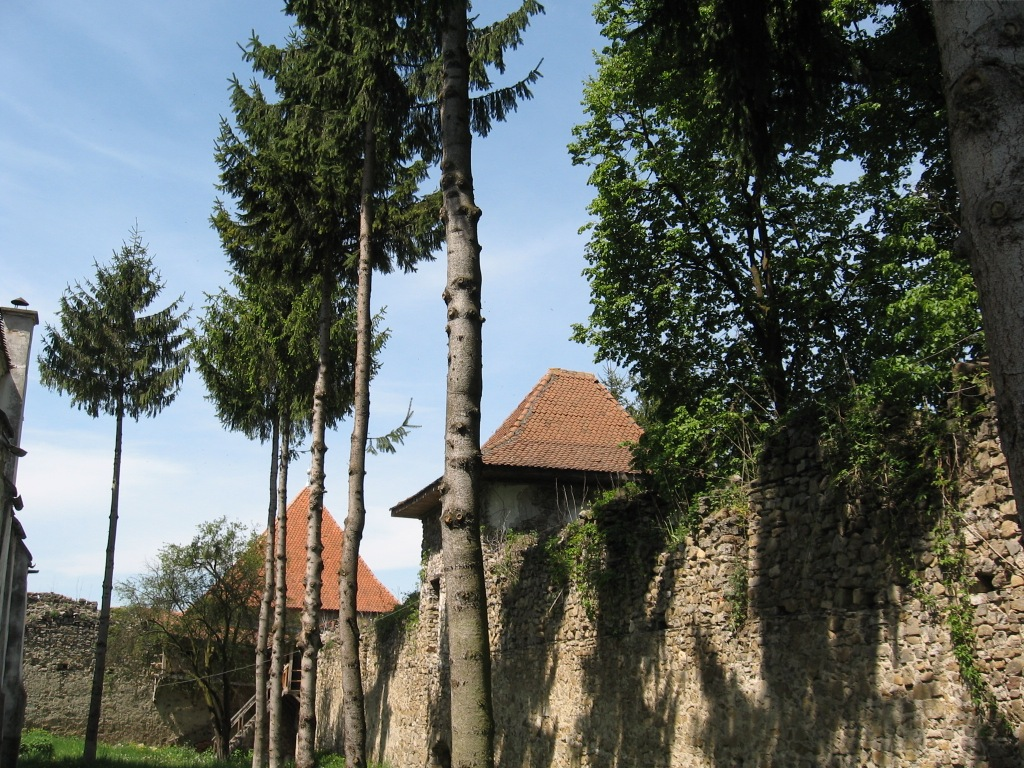
Unitarian church

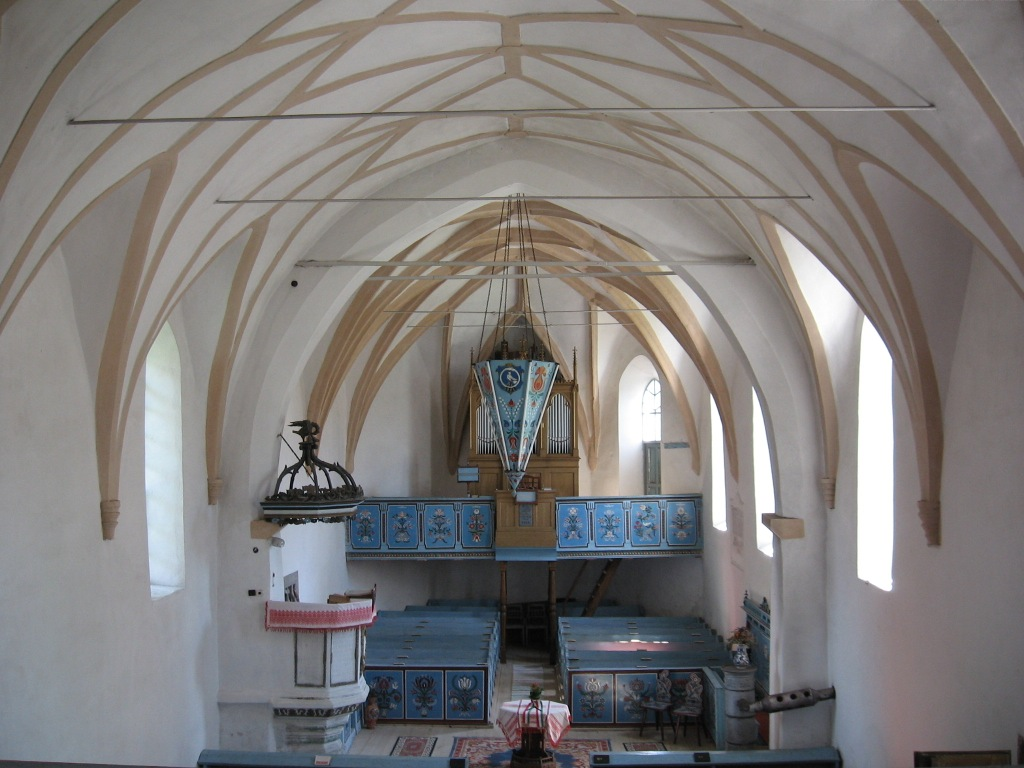
Unitarian church

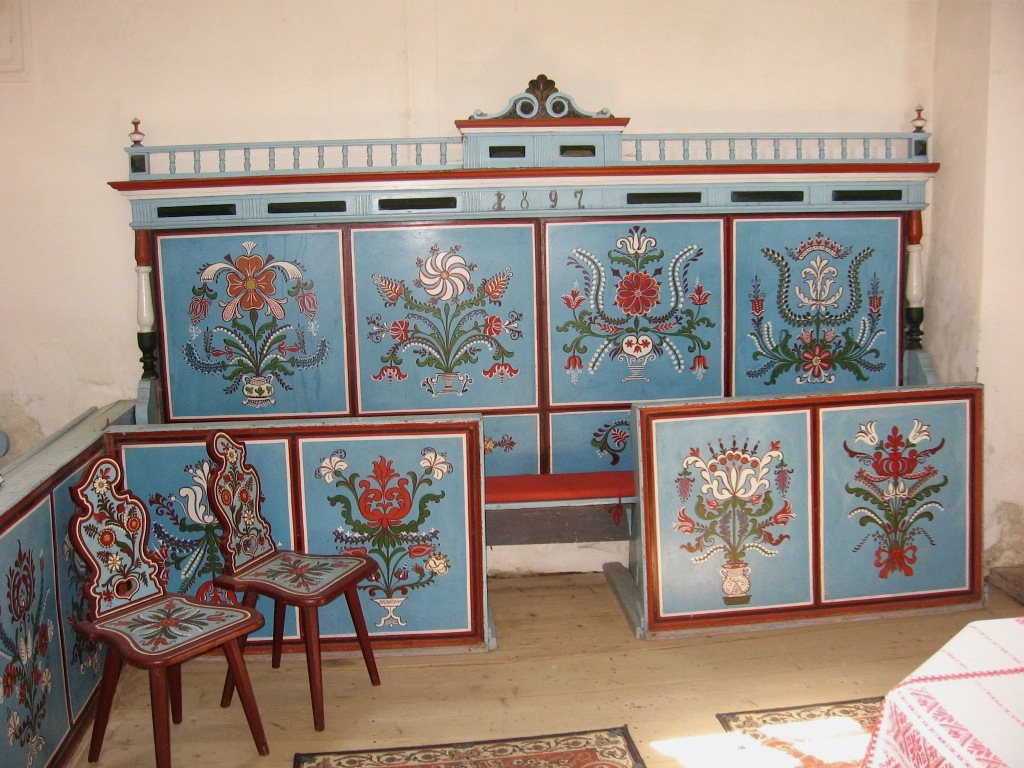
Unitarian church

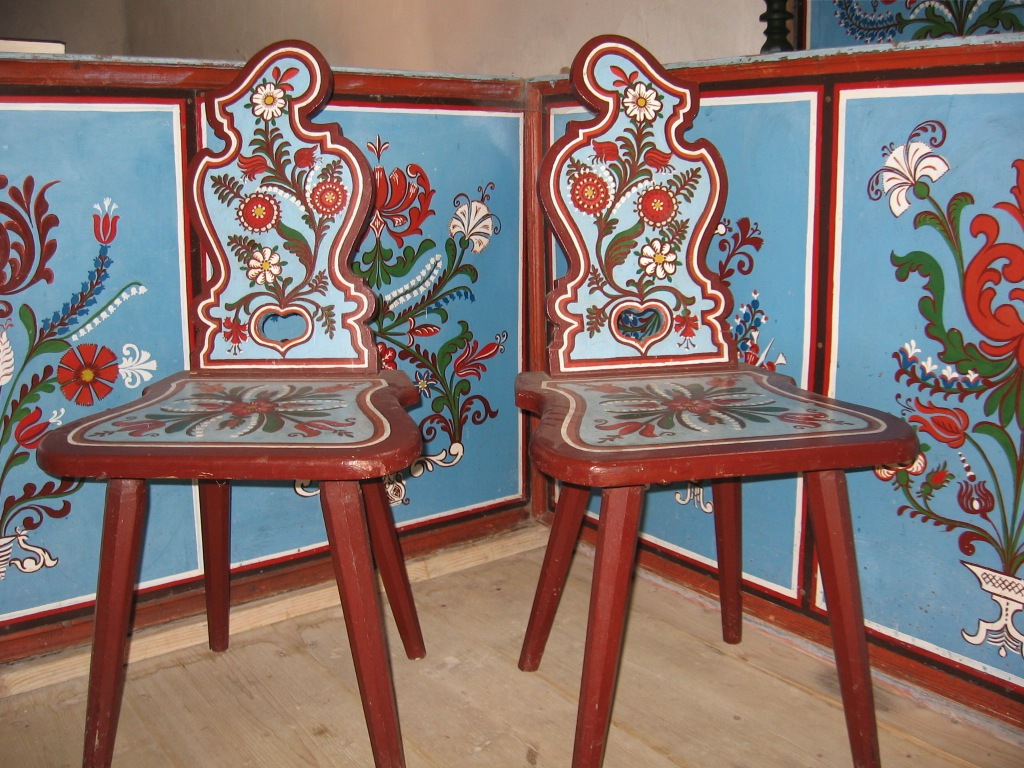
Wedding chairs

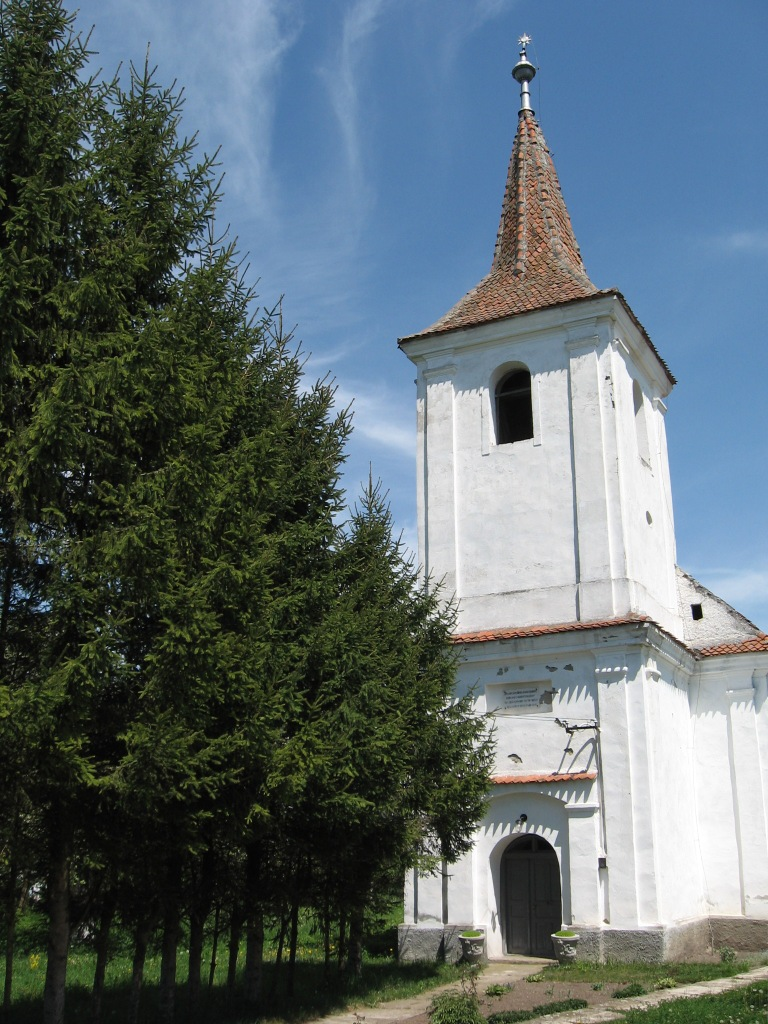
Reformed church

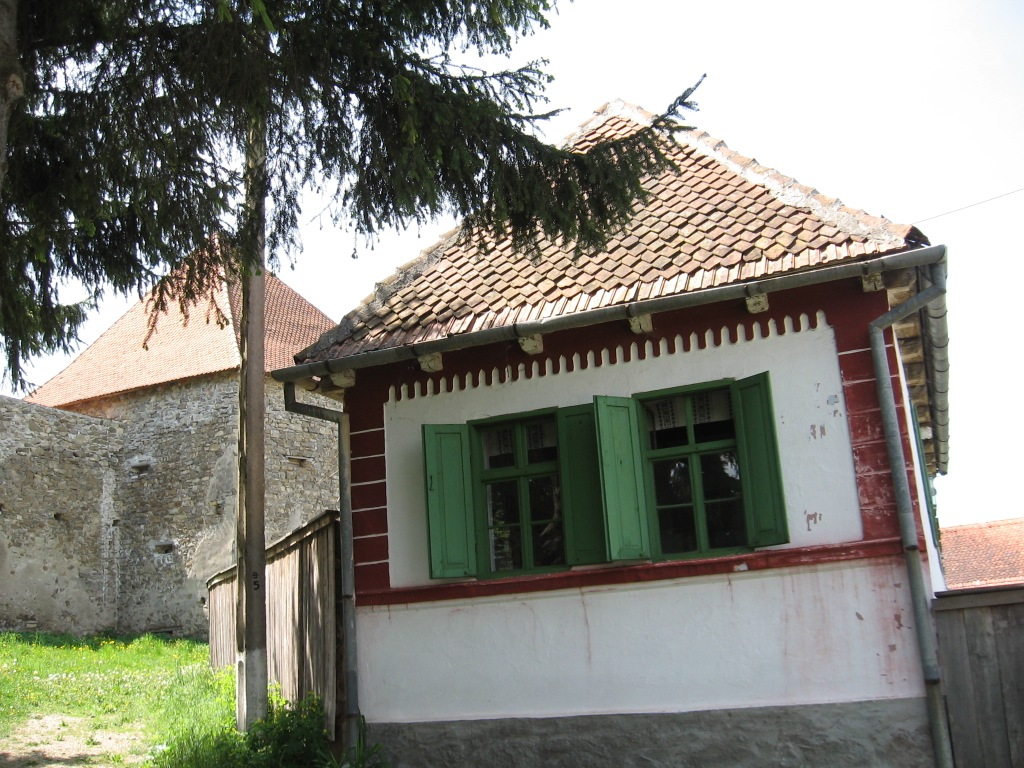
Kriza János memorial house

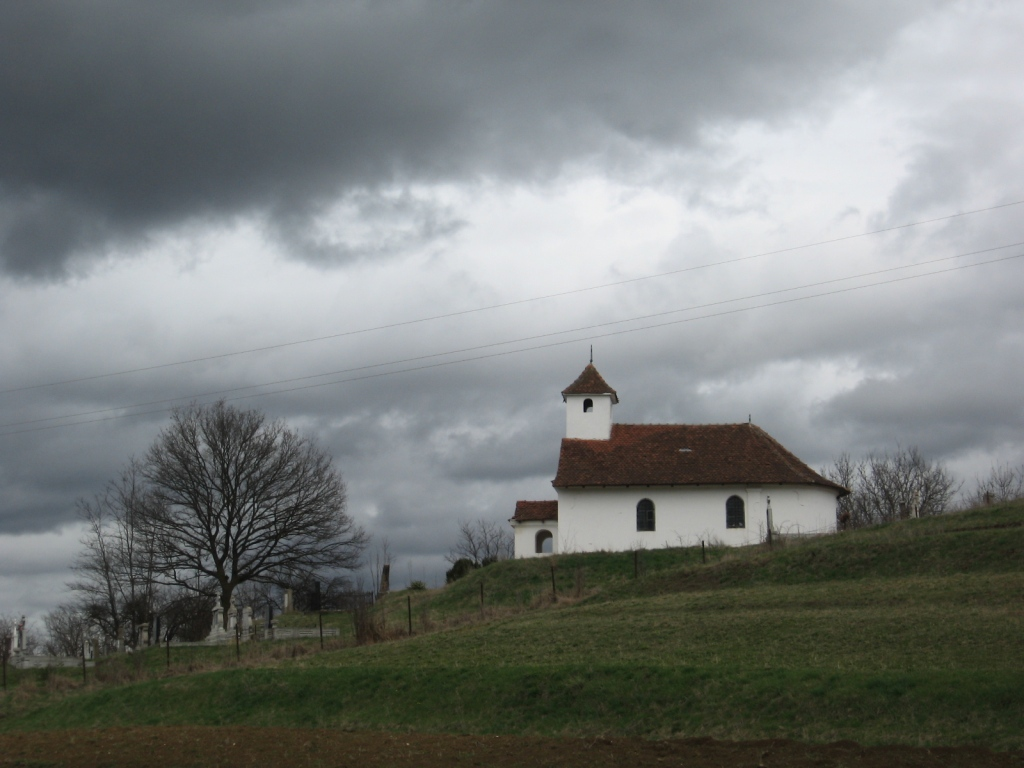
The old Orthodox church
