= Boroșneu Mare =

Boroșneu Mare Nagyborosnyó
- Commune
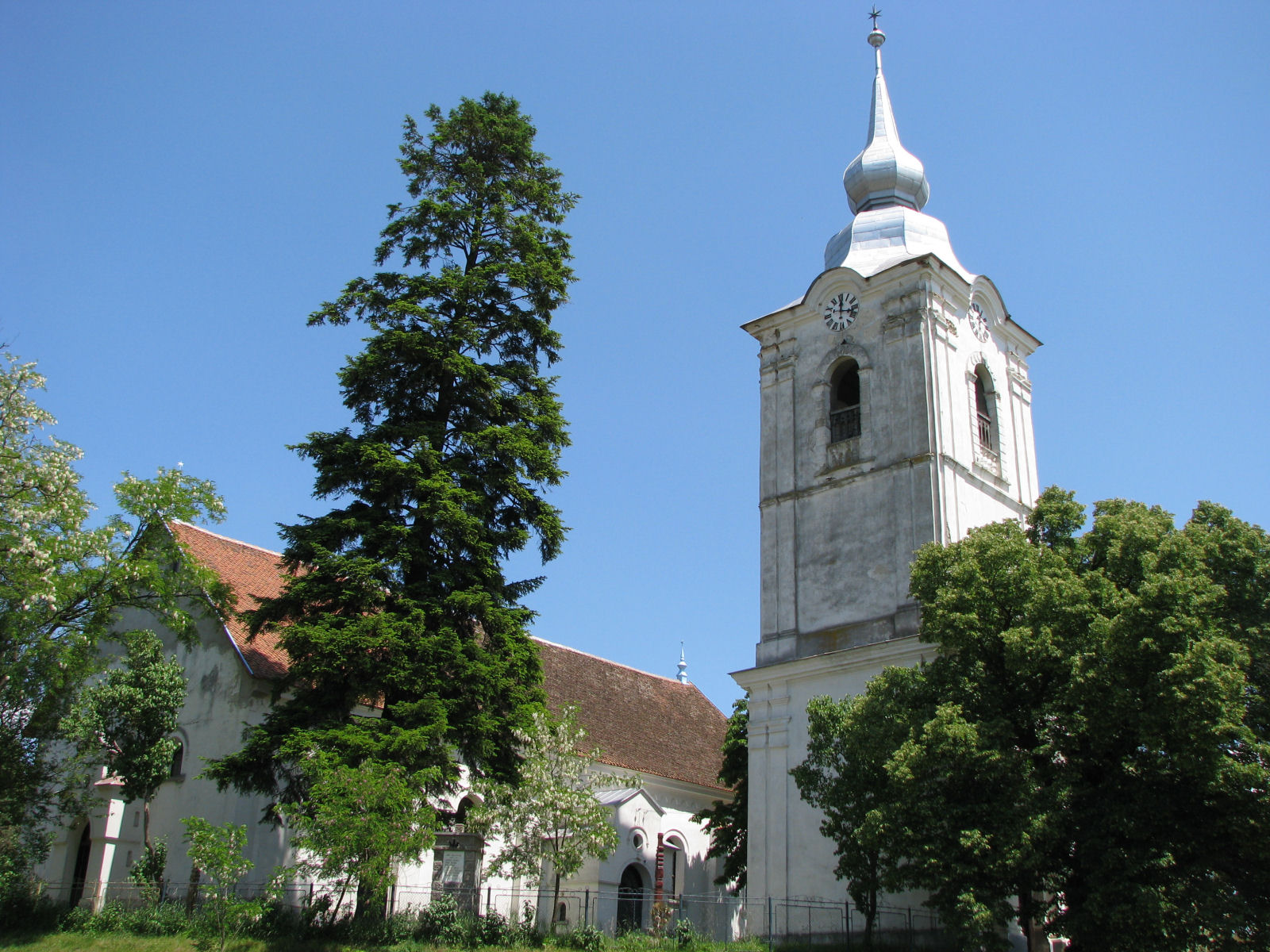
- Reformed church in Leț

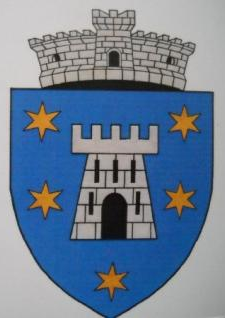
- Coat of arms

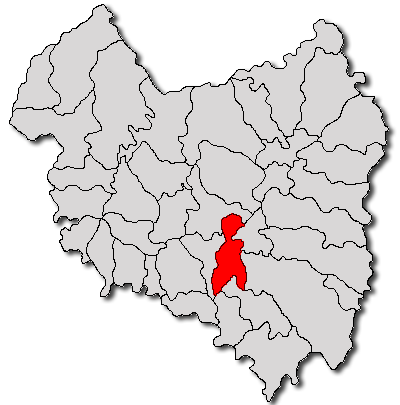
- Location in Covasna County

- Location in Romania
- Coordinates: 45°49′N 26°0′E
- Country: Romania
- County: Covasna

Government
  - Mayor (2020–2024): Nicolae Ilie (ALDE)
- Area: 44.08 km^{2} (17.02 sq mi)
- Elevation: 564 m (1,850 ft)
- Population (2021-12-01): 3,186
  - Density: 72.28/km^{2} (187.2/sq mi)
- Time zone: UTC+02:00 (EET)
  - Summer (DST): UTC+03:00 (EEST)
- Postal code: 527040
- Area code: (+40) 02 67
- Vehicle reg.: CV
- Website: nagyborosnyo.ro

Boroșneu Mare (Romanian: Boroșneu Mare; Hungarian: Nagyborosnyó; German: Groß-Weindorf) is a commune in Covasna County, Transylvania, Romania composed of six villages: Boroșneu Mare, Boroșneu Mic (Kisborosnyó), Dobolii de Sus (Feldoboly), Leț (Lécfalva), Țufalău (Cófalva), and Valea Mică (Kispatak).

== Demographics ==
The commune has an absolute Székely Hungarian majority. According to the 2002 census, it had a population of 3,074, of whom 95.48% or 2,935 were Hungarian. Ar the 2021 census, Boroșneu Mare had a population of 3,186; of those, 89.96% were Hungarians, 4.05% Roma, and 2.45% Romanians.

== Leț ==
Leț village, which lies on the Dalnic River, had 650 people in 2002, of whom 557 were Székely. It was settled during the Stone Age. Evidence of multicoloured painting has been found which exhibits strong Bulgarian traits. The village was first mentioned in a document of 1333, when it was destroyed by the Mongols. It is the site of the Diet of Lécfalva (25 October 1600), notable for being the first time the word "Unitarian" was used. In 1960, the local manor was demolished.
