= Covasna =

Covasna Kovászna
- Town
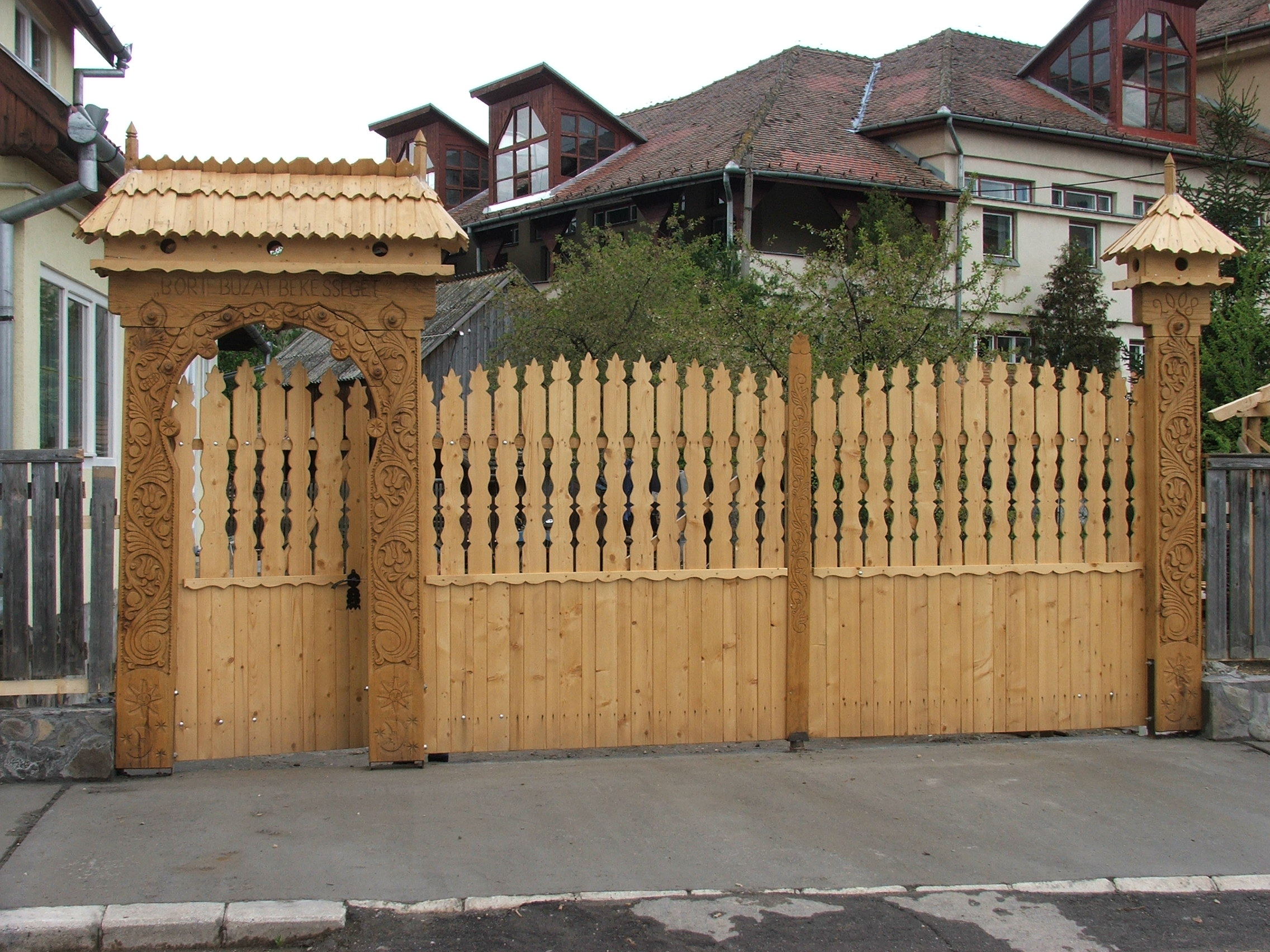

- Coat of arms

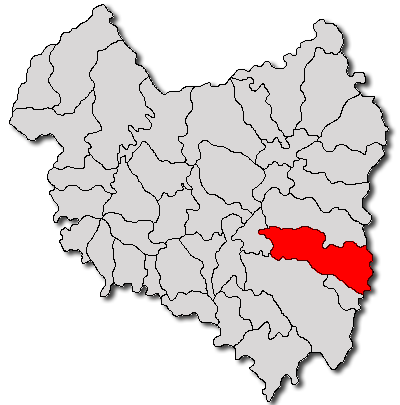
- Location in Covasna County

- Location in Romania
- Coordinates: 45°50′57″N 26°11′7″E
- Country: Romania
- County: Covasna

Government
  - Mayor (2024–2028): József Gyerő (UDMR)
- Area: 155.11 km^{2} (59.89 sq mi)
- Elevation: 560 m (1,840 ft)
- Highest elevation: 600 m (2,000 ft)
- Lowest elevation: 550 m (1,800 ft)
- Population (2021-12-01): 9,208
  - Density: 59.36/km^{2} (153.8/sq mi)
- Time zone: UTC+02:00 (EET)
  - Summer (DST): UTC+03:00 (EEST)
- Postal code: 525200
- Area code: (+40) 02 67
- Vehicle reg.: CV
- Website: www.primariacovasna.ro

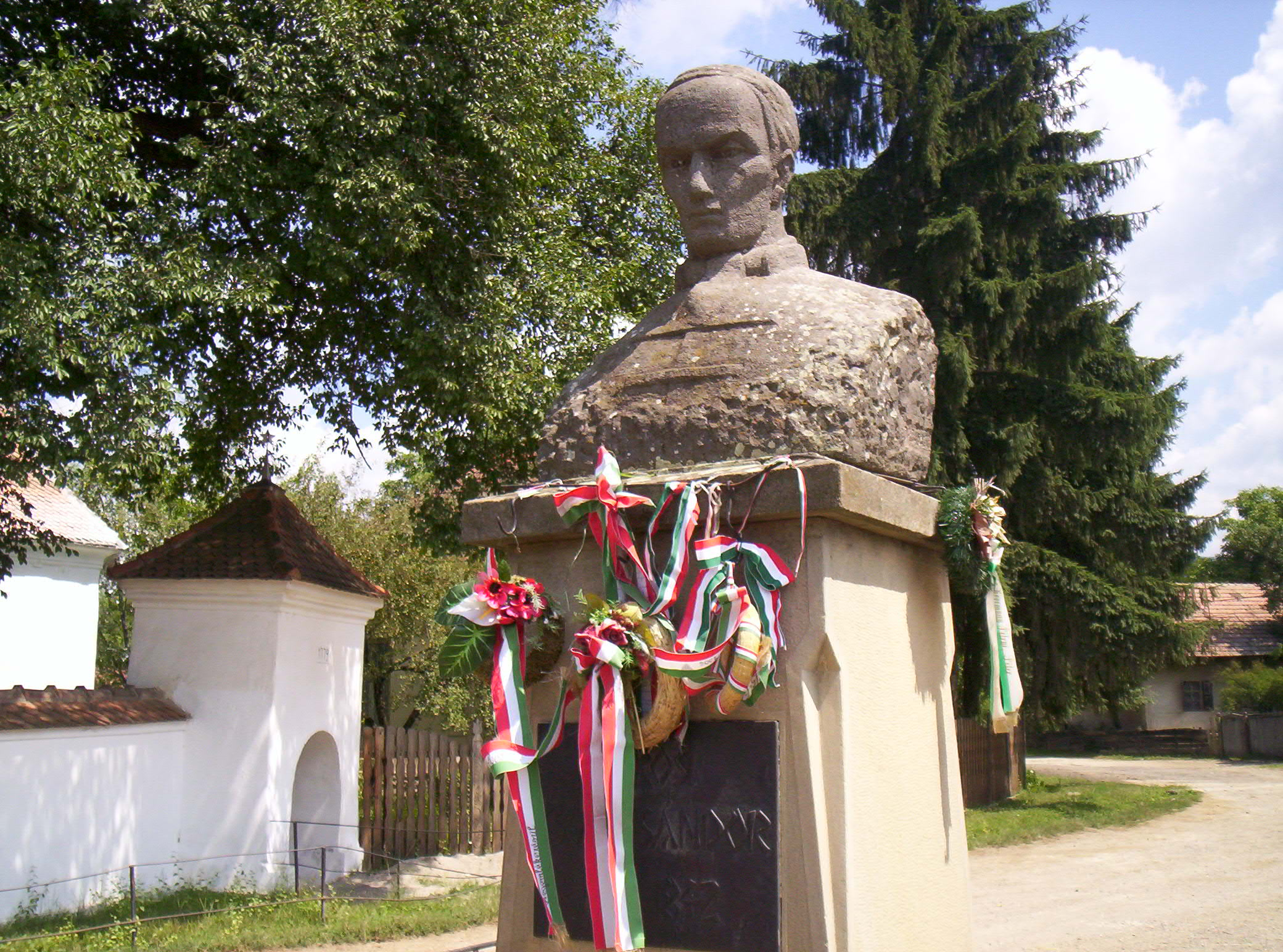
The statue of Sándor Kőrösi Csoma

Covasna (Romanian pronunciation: [koˈvasna], Hungarian: Kovászna, Hungarian pronunciation: [ˈkovaːsnɒ], German: Kowasna) is a town in Covasna County, Transylvania, Romania, at an altitude of 550–600 m (1,800–1,970 ft). It is known for its natural mineral waters and mofettas.

The town administers one village, Chiuruș (Hungarian: Csomakőrös). The village has a population of 451 and has an absolute Székely Hungarian majority.

Before Orbaiszék merged with Sepsiszék and Kézdiszék to create Háromszék County, in 1876, Covasna was the capital village of Orbaiszék.

== Name origin ==
There are several theories regarding the origin of the city's name, the most recognized one being that it originates from the Slavic kvas, which means "bitter", referring to the taste of the mineral water springs located in the city.

According to Szabó Gyula (1914–1984), some legends suggest that the name of Kovászna might have been the result of a fusion between the name of "Kó" and the word "vászon" (it means canvas in Hungarian), thus meaning "Kó's canvas". Theories suggest that the individual of "Kó" might have been a knight, a craftsman or even the last monarch of the Fairies Fortress.

== Demographics ==
At the 2021 census, Covasna had a population of 9,208; of those, 60.34% were Hungarians and 31.14% were Romanians. At the 2011 census, the town had 10,265 inhabitants, of which 7,549 or 66.4% were Hungarians and 3,672 or 32.3% were Romanians.

Demographic movement according to the censuses:

== History ==
- 1548 – First mentioned as Kowazna.
- 1567 – Mentioned in a document, as a prestigious locality, having 61 registered homes.
- 1756 – Gets destroyed by conflagration.
- 1840 – Gets the right to hold its own market.
- 1880 – Covasna has flourished as a health resort since the 1880s.
- 1837, 1856, 1885 – The Pokolsár ( in Romanian: Balta Dracului; in English: Devil's Lake) mud volcano erupts.
- 1889–91 – the Covasna–Comandău narrow-gauge railway is built
- 1952 – Covasna became a town.
- 1970's – Several hotels and cure centers were built in Covasna.
- 1996 – Forest fire in the Fairie's Valley.
- 2000's – Covasna is a nationally important spa town in Romania, having an important cardiovascular hospital.

== International relations ==
=== Twin towns – Sister cities ===
Covasna is twinned with:

- Pápa, Hungary
- Nagykanizsa, Hungary
- Gyula, Hungary
- Balatonfüred, Hungary
- Csenger, Hungary
- Călărași, Moldova

== Natives ==
- Horia Colan (1926–2017), engineer and titular member of the Romanian Academy
- Demosten Ioniță (1927–2024), bishop of the Old Calendar Orthodox Church of Romania from 2022 to 2024
- Sándor Kőrösi Csoma (1784–1842), born in Chiuruș/Csomakőrös, was a Hungarian explorer and linguist. Widely seen as the founder of Tibetology, Kőrösi was the compiler and author of the first Tibetan–English dictionary and grammar book. He died in Darjeeling, India in 1842. A statue in his honour was erected in the centre of the village in 1972 and there is an exhibition in the cultural centre.
- Iozefina Ștefănescu (1932–2015), handballer
- Iustinian Teculescu (1865–1932), born Ioan Teculescu. A Romanian Orthodox cleric, he was archpriest of Alba Iulia and one of the main organizers of the Great Union from December 1, 1918.
