= Covasna County =

County of Romania

Covasna County Județul Covasna Kovászna megye
- County
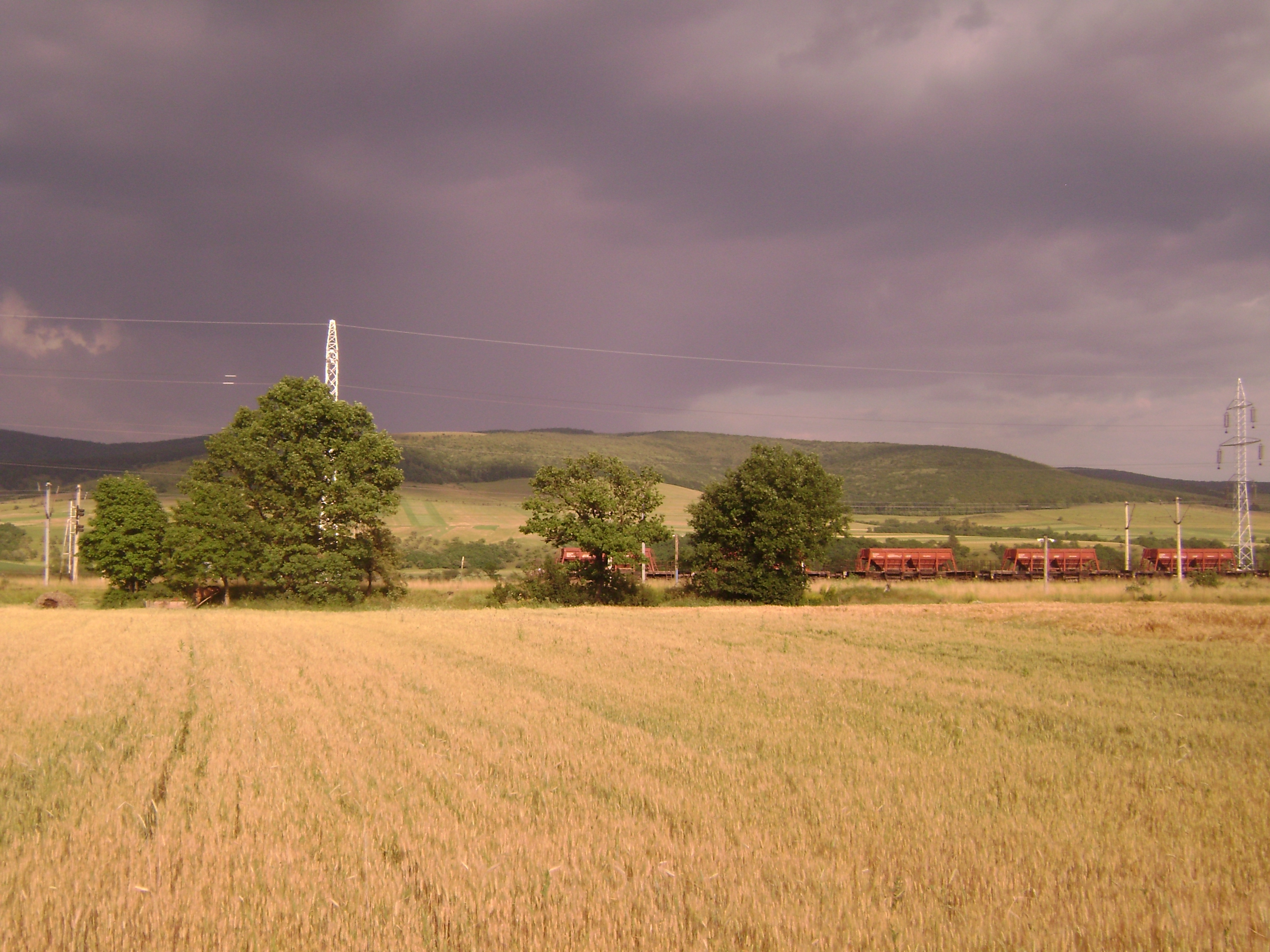
- Landscape in the northern part of Covasna County

- Flag Coat of arms

- Coordinates: 45.9°N 26.03°E
- Country: Romania
- Development region^{1}: Centru
- Historic region: Transylvania
- Capital city (Reședință de județ): Sfântu Gheorghe

Government
  - Type: County Council
  - President of the County Council: Sándor Tamás (UDMR)
  - Prefect^{2}: István Ráduly

Area
  - Total: 3,710 km^{2} (1,430 sq mi)
  - Rank: 39th in Romania

Population (2021-12-01)
  - Total: 200,042
  - Rank: 42nd in Romania
  - Density: 53.9/km^{2} (140/sq mi)
- Time zone: UTC+2 (EET)
  - Summer (DST): UTC+3 (EEST)
- Postal Code: 52wxyz^{3}
- Area code: +40 x67^{4}
- Car plates: CV^{5}
- GDP: US$3.105 billion (2025)
- GDP per capita: US$15,521 (2025)
- Website: County Council; County Prefecture
- ^{1}The developing regions of Romania have no administrative role.^{2} as of 2007, the Prefect is not a politician, but a public functionary. He (or she) is not allowed to be a member of a political party, and is banned to have any political activity in the first six months after the resignation (or exclusion) from the public functionary corps^{3}w, x, y, and z are digits that indicate the city, the street, part of the street, or even the building of the address^{4}x is a digit indicating the operator: 2 for the former national operator, Romtelecom, and 3 for the other ground telephone networks^{5}used on both the plates of the vehicles that operate only in the county limits (like utility vehicles, ATVs, etc.), and the ones used outside the county

Covasna County (Romanian pronunciation: [koˈvasna], Hungarian: Kovászna megye, Hungarian pronunciation: [ˈkovaːsnɒ]) is a county (județ) of Romania, in eastern Transylvania, with the county seat at Sfântu Gheorghe.

== Demographics ==
In 2011, it had a population of 210,177, making it the second least populous of Romania's 41 counties and the population density was 55.6 inhabitants per square kilometre (144/sq mi). By area, it is also the third-smallest county in Romania after Giurgiu and Ilfov Counties.

In 2002 the ethnic composition of the county was as follows:

- Hungarians – 73.58% (or 164,158)
- Romanians – 23.28% (or 51,790)
- Romani – 2.68% (or 5,973)

According to the 2011 census, the composition of the county was:

- Hungarians – 73.74% (or 150,468)
- Romanians – 22.02% (or 45,021)
- Romani – 4.05% (or 8,267)
- Others – 0.19%

According to the 2021 census, the composition of the county was:

- Hungarians – 71.77% (or 133,444)
- Romanians – 22.99% (or 42,752)
- Romani – 5.11% (or 9,507)
- Others – 0.13% (or 238)

Covasna County has the second-greatest percentage of Hungarian population in Romania, just behind the neighboring county of Harghita. The Hungarians of Covasna are primarily Székelys. Covasna and neighboring Harghita County are the only two counties in Romania that do not have an ethnic Romanian majority.

Year	County population
1948	157,166 ▲
1956	172,509 ▲
1966	176,858 ▲
1977	199,017 ▲
1992	232,592 ▲
2002	222,449 ▼
2011	210,177 ▼
2021	200,042 ▼

== Geography ==
Covasna county has a total area of 3,710 km^{2} (1,430 sq mi).

The main part of the relief consists of mountains from the Eastern Carpathians group. Most localities can be found in the valleys and depressions located along the different rivers crossing the county. The main river is the Olt River; along its banks lies the capital city Sfântu Gheorghe.

=== Neighbours ===
- Vrancea County and Bacău County in the east
- Brașov County in the west
- Harghita County in the north
- Buzău County in the south

== Economy ==
Covasna County's industry's main sectors are food industry (33.79%), ready-made garment and textile (21.93%), wood and wooden products (14.98%), metals, machines and automotive suppliers (10.31%), building materials (9.68%). Other sectors of industry are chemicals (4.67%), toys (2.02%), water (1.09%), printing (0.45%), energy (0.13%), jewelry (0.05%), and other industrial activities (0.83%).

Industry represents 42.53% of Covasna County's economy. The other main sectors are trade with 30.98%, services 11.38%, agriculture 9.71%, construction 5.78%, and R&D and high-tech 2.63%.

Companies from Covasna County's industry produced in 2014 almost half a billion euros (477,199,849 EUR) turnover, with a staggering 10.78% increase in volume compared to the preceding year's income.

One of Covasna County's main industrial sectors is the ready-made garment industry, where processing companies are owned by German investors, who started to establish first brown-field investments in 1992, and since then they operate nine factories producing yearly 5 million trousers for brands like Bosch, Meyer, and Wegener. Other privately owned companies in the field of textiles, producing different articles; some of them have their own brand, while the others work in lohn systems.

In 2015 the Schweighoffer Holzindustrie started, after investing 150 million EUR in a new plant for primary wood processing. With the rich forested areas, Covasna has a long tradition of sawn timber export and production of furniture and other finished wooden products. Recently created the ProWood Cluster in the interest of the industry.

A few years ago, automotive suppliers established two new plants in the region, producing steering wheels and electrical components for vehicles. Companies in Covasna and neighboring Brașov offer a wide range of competitive products, from circuit boards for Mercedes vehicles to components for Airbus helicopters, and have strong growth potential. Other notable companies include Poliprod, a French-owned family business within the Champrenaut Group specializing in steelwork, locksmithing, welding, and machining, and a leading Eastern European manufacturer of electric ceramic heaters that is part of Canada’s Delta Group. The sector can further expand its workforce by recruiting graduates from Brașov’s major technical university.

Covalact is a well-known national dairy product brand, now owned by Dutch investors. Another milk processing plant is under brand Olympus, with Greek investors, establishing its headquarters in the county.

Meat processing companies are the Bertis and Toro Impex, who are regionally active players, while the Norvegian Orkla food producing network has a meat canning plant in Covasna.

Dunapack, a member of the Austrian Prizhorn, supplies corrugated cardboard boxes to almost all industry branches, from FMCG to fruit, vegetables, and electronics.

While IT&C as an industry sector is in an emerging state, Covasna County's strategy for development plans to use this field of activity as a pillar for development. Many new start-ups in the area deploy large projects for international companies. Many young technicians arrive from universities.

Agriculture represents 4.83% of Covasna County's economy, mainly producing varieties of potatoes, several companies being able to supply selected and packaged crops for hyper-markets. Other agricultural products are rapeseed, grains, and cabbage.

Covasna County, with many mineral water springs, has developed during history a network of spas for treating different health problems, mainly cardio-vascular. There is a good potential for development of this field of health and spa tourism.

== Tourism ==
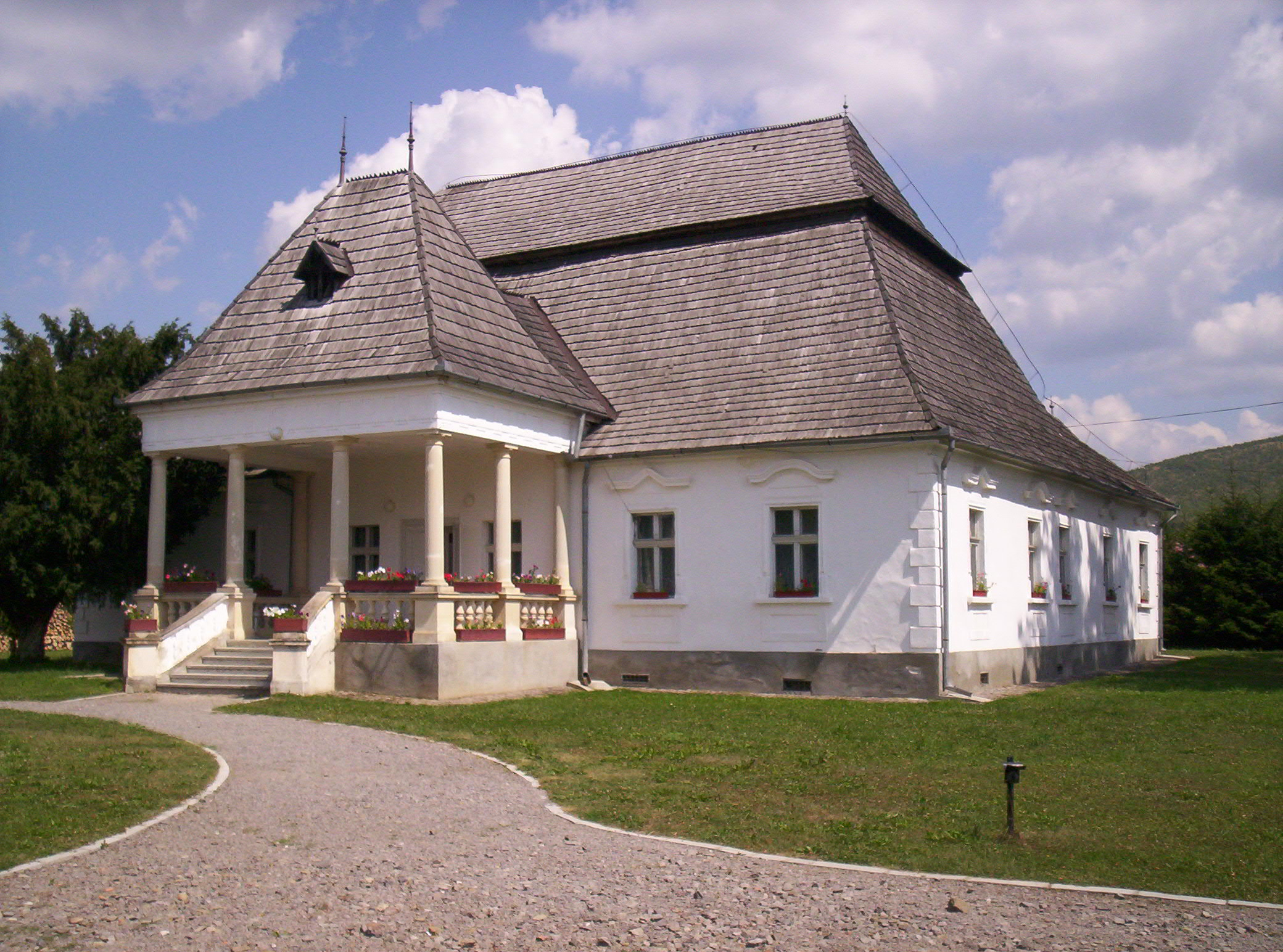
Mikes-Szentkereszty manor-house of Zagon

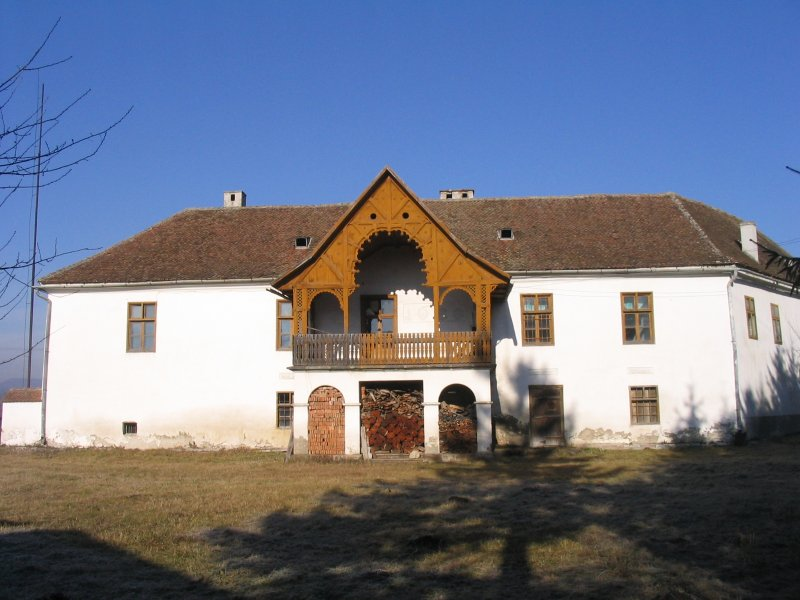
Daniel Castle of Tălișoara

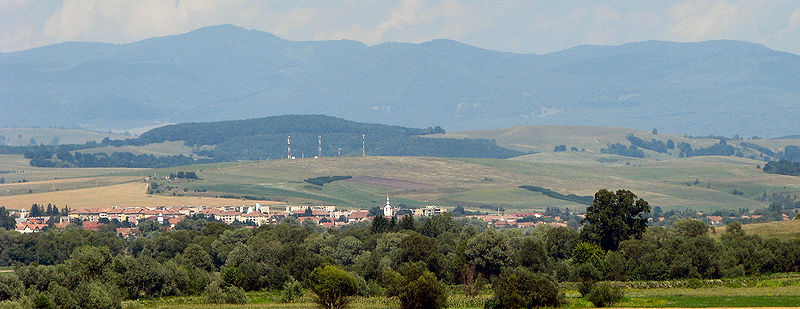
Baraolt Mountains

The main tourist destinations in the county are:

- The city of Sfântu Gheorghe
- The resorts in the mountains around:
  - Covasna
  - Balványos
  - Malnaș-Băi
  - Vâlcele
  - Șugaș-Băi
  - Băile Fortyogo
  - Biborțeni
  - Ozunca-Bai
- The mountains:
  - Baraolt Mountains
  - Bodoc Mountains
  - Nemira Mountains
  - Întorsurii Mountains

== Politics ==
The Covasna County Council, renewed at the 2020 local elections, consists of 30 counsellors, with the following party composition:

Party	Seats	Current County Council
Democratic Alliance of Hungarians (UDMR/RMDSZ)	22	
Hungarian Alliance Of Transylvania	3	
National Liberal Party (PNL)	3	
Social Democratic Party (PSD)	2	

== Administrative divisions ==
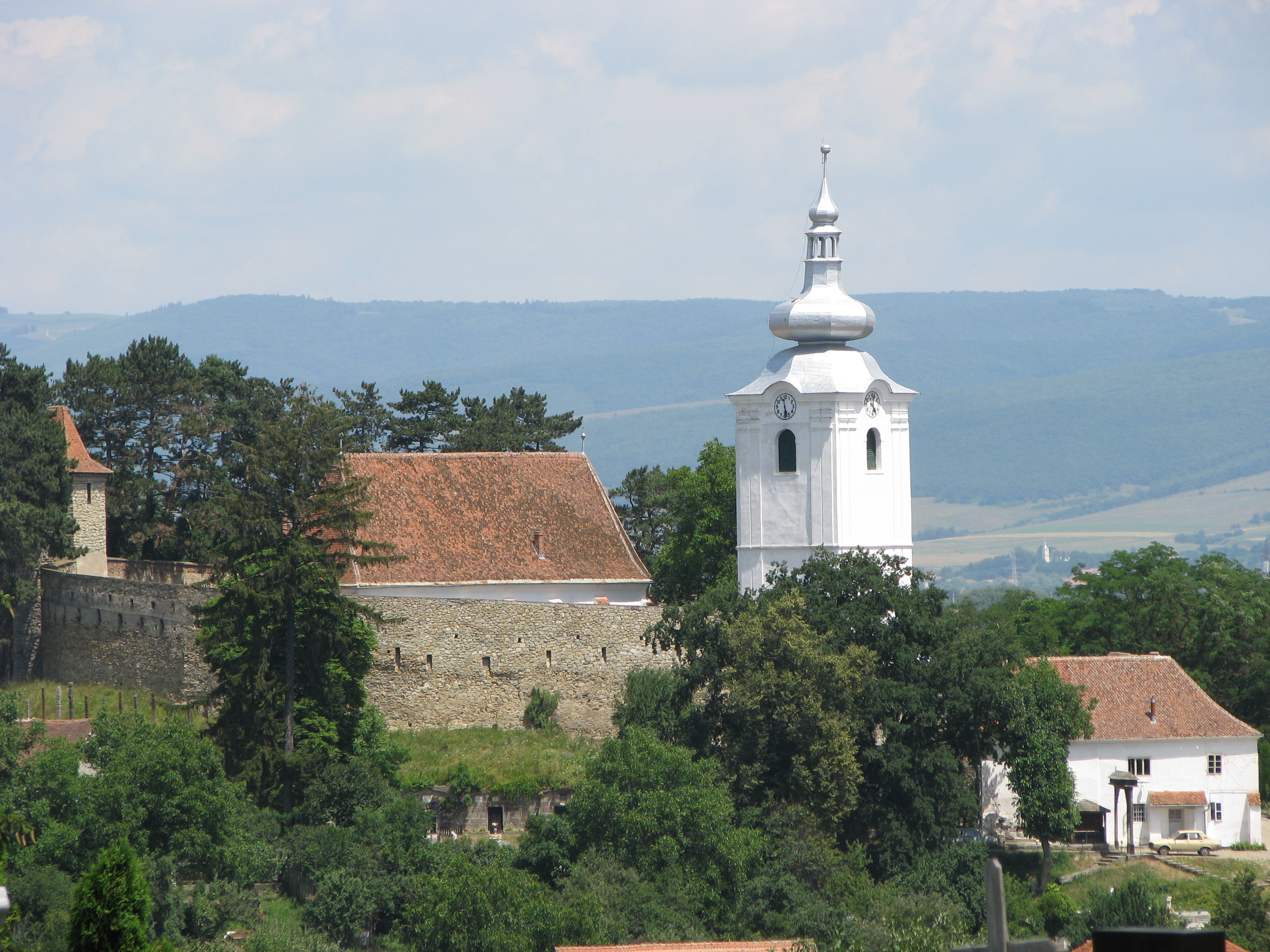
Fortified church in Sfântu Gheorghe

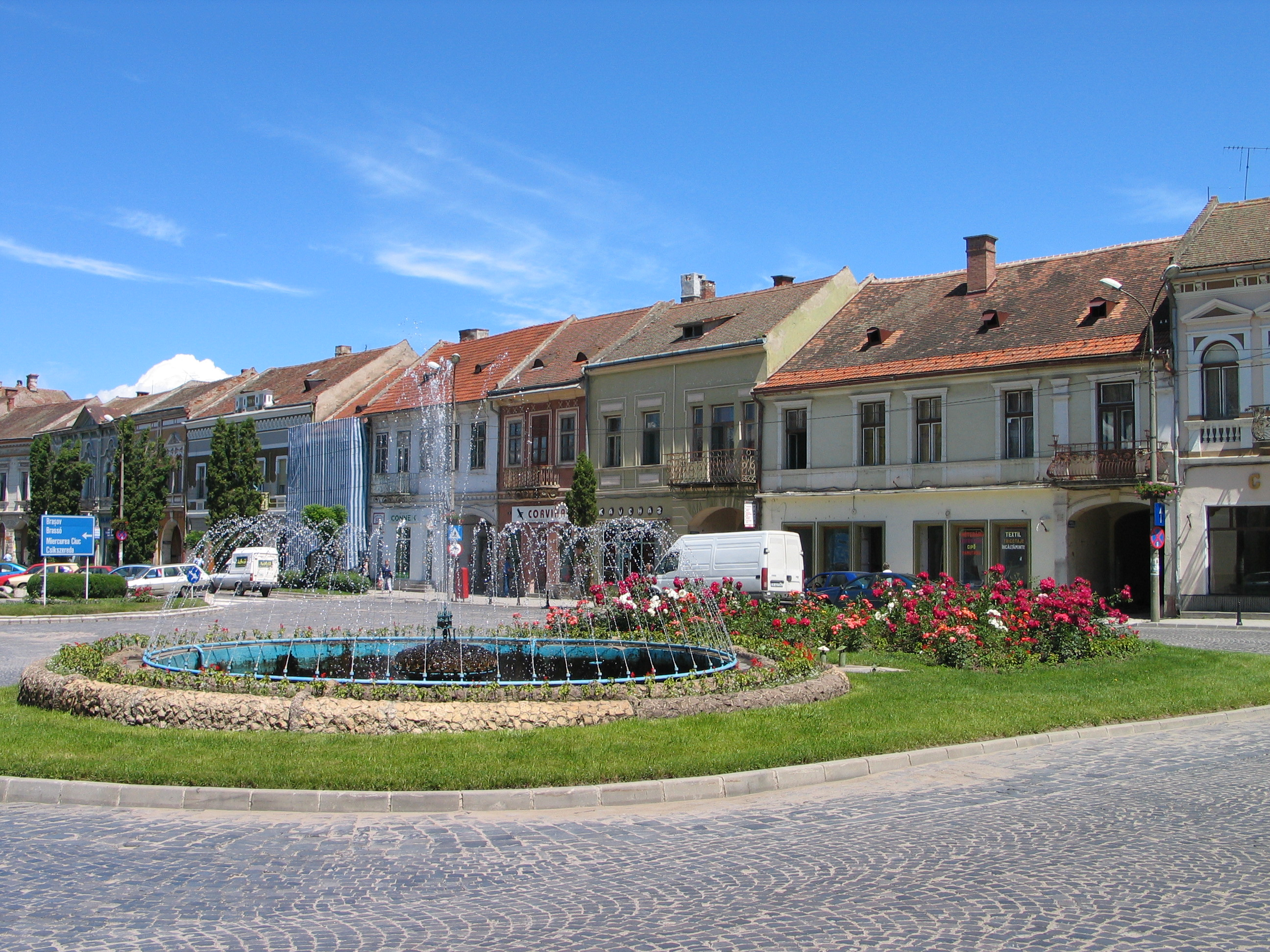
Târgu Secuiesc

Covasna County has two municipalities, three towns and 40 communes.

Municipalities:

- Sfântu Gheorghe – capital city; population: 54,312 (as of 2011)
- Târgu Secuiesc

Towns:

- Baraolt
- Covasna
- Întorsura Buzăului

Communes:

- Aita Mare
- Arcuș
- Barcani
- Bățani
- Belin
- Bixad
- Bodoc
- Boroșneu Mare
- Brăduț
- Brateș
- Brețcu
- Catalina
- Cernat
- Chichiș
- Comandău
- Dalnic
- Dobârlău
- Estelnic
- Ghelința
- Ghidfalău
- Hăghig
- Ilieni
- Lemnia
- Malnaș
- Mereni
- Micfalău
- Moacșa
- Ojdula
- Ozun
- Poian
- Reci
- Sânzieni
- Sita Buzăului
- Turia
- Vâlcele
- Valea Crișului
- Valea Mare
- Vârghiș
- Zăbala
- Zagon

== See also ==
- Former Háromszék County of the Kingdom of Hungary
- Former Trei Scaune County of the Kingdom of Romania
