= Brețcu =

Brețcu Bereck
- Commune
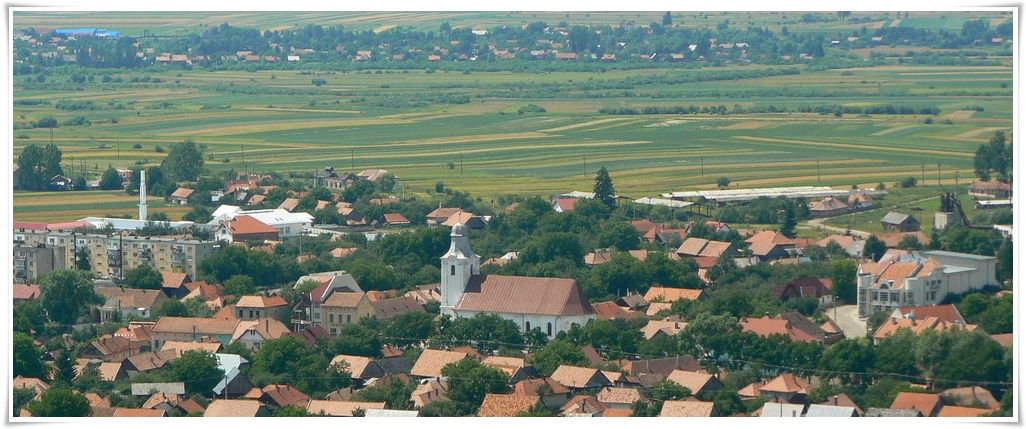

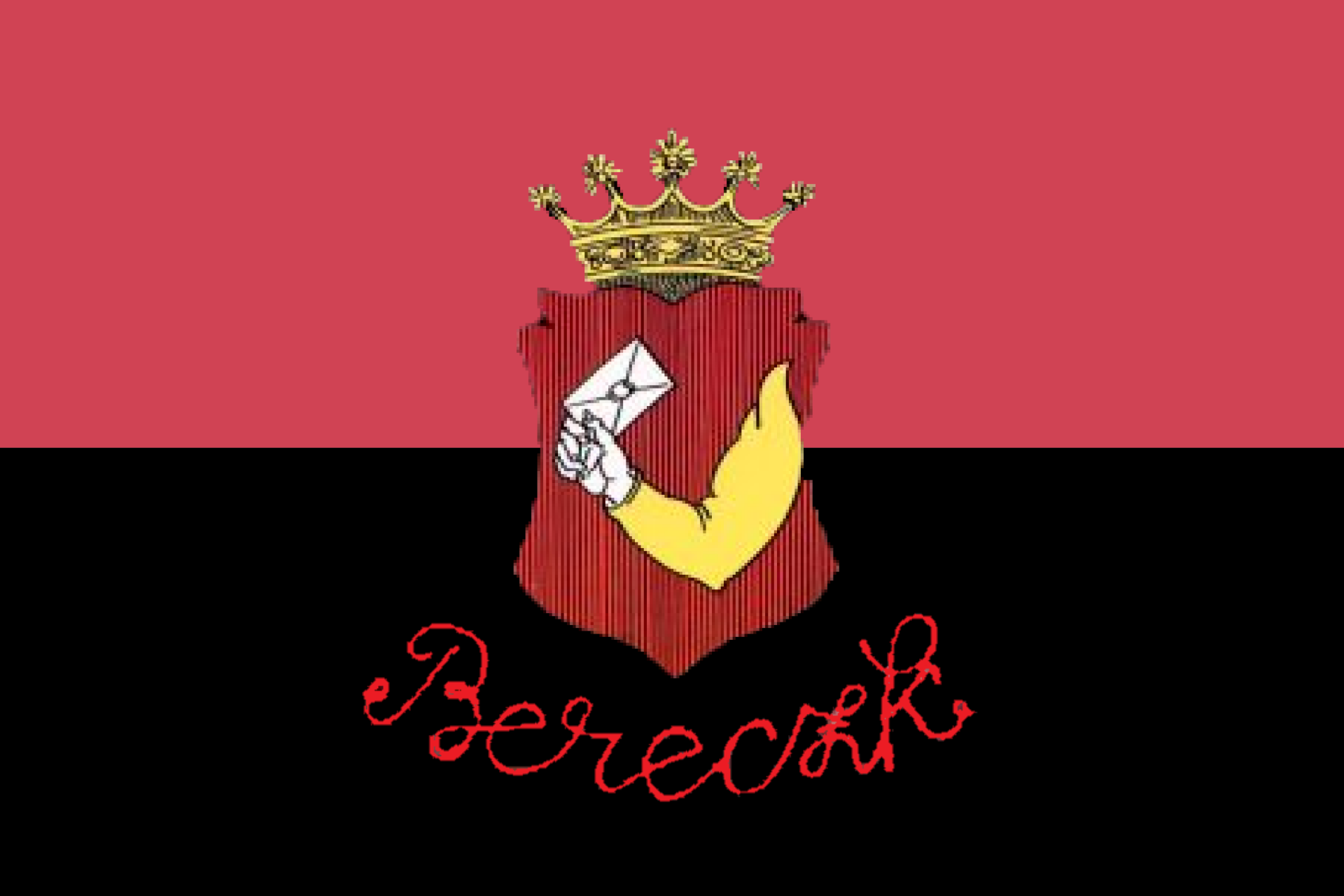
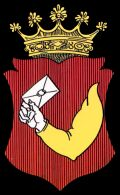
- Flag Coat of arms

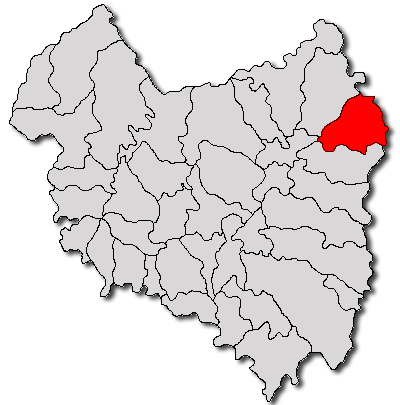
- Location in Covasna County

- Location in Romania
- Coordinates: 46°3′N 26°18′E
- Country: Romania
- County: Covasna

Government
  - Mayor (2020–2024): Zoltán Dimény (UDMR)
- Area: 116.03 km^{2} (44.80 sq mi)
- Elevation: 600 m (2,000 ft)
- Population (2021-12-01): 3,132
  - Density: 26.99/km^{2} (69.91/sq mi)
- Time zone: UTC+02:00 (EET)
  - Summer (DST): UTC+03:00 (EEST)
- Postal code: 527060
- Area code: (+40) 02 67
- Vehicle reg.: CV
- Website: bretcu-bereck.ro

Brețcu (Romanian: [ˈbret͡sku]; Hungarian: Bereck, Hungarian pronunciation: [ˈbɛrɛtsk]; Latin: Angustia) is a commune in Covasna County, Transylvania, Romania composed of three villages: Brețcu, Mărtănuș (Kézdimartonos), and Oituz (Ojtoztelep). The village has been recorded under different names: Bereczk (1476), Breczko (1482–1496), Bretzku (1787 and 1850), and Bereck (1854).

== Geography ==
The commune is located in the northeastern part of Covasna County, 16 km (9.9 mi) from Târgu Secuiesc and 51 km (32 mi) from the county seat, Sfântu Gheorghe, on the border with Bacău County and close to the border with Vrancea County. Brețcu is situated at an altitude of 600 m (2,000 ft), in the foothills of the Nemira and Brețcu mountains, both of which are mountain ranges of the Eastern Carpathians. Brețcu village lies on the banks of Râul Negru and its left tributary, the river Brețcu, while Oituz village lies on the banks of the river Oituz, which flows eastward, towards Moldavia.

Brețcu is crossed by national road DN11 (part of European route E574), which starts in Brașov, passes through Târgu Secuiesc and Onești, and ends in Bacău. The Brețcu train station serves the 66 km (41 mi) long CFR Line 404, which starts in Sfântu Gheorghe, goes through Covasna, and ends in Brețcu; currently, the only operator on this route is Regio Călători.

== History ==
The Roman castra and settlement of Angustia and is located on the east side of the village. Gheorghe Popa-Lisseanu argued that Brețcu was an old Romanian land mentioned in 1426 by King Sigismund in an official document. In that document, King Sigismund offered privileges to Romanians and to their Duke (the names of some Romanians were cited: Ioan and Radul, Țacu's son). The document contains the first attestation of Brețcu village.

On May 13, 1912, the village was hit by a violent F3 tornado. The tornado destroyed a total of 1,548 homes, killing 17 and injuring 150 others.

The settlement formed part of the Székely Land region of the historical Transylvania province. Until 1918, the village belonged to the Háromszék County of the Kingdom of Hungary. In the immediate aftermath of World War I, following the declaration of the Union of Transylvania with Romania, the area passed under Romanian administration, during the Hungarian–Romanian War (1918–1919). By the terms of the Treaty of Trianon of 1920, it became part of the Kingdom of Romania. In 1925, the commune fell in Plasa Târgu Secuiesc of Trei Scaune County.

In August 1940, under the auspices of Nazi Germany, which imposed the Second Vienna Award, Hungary retook the territory of Northern Transylvania (which included Brețcu) from Romania. Towards the end of World War II, however, the commune was taken back from Hungarian and German troops by Romanian and Soviet forces in September–October 1944.

In 1950, after Communist Romania was established, Brețcu became part of the Târgu Secuiesc Raion of Stalin Region. From 1952 and 1960, it was part of the Magyar Autonomous Region, and between 1960 and 1968 it reverted to Brașov Region. In 1968, when Romania was reorganized based on counties rather than regions, the commune became part of Covasna County.

== Demographics ==
Historical population
Year	Pop.	±%
1850	3,996	—
1930	4,402	+10.2%
1966	4,847	+10.1%
2002	3,908	−19.4%
2011	3,550	−9.2%
2021	3,132	−11.8%
Source: Census data

According to the 2011 census, the commune had a population of 3,550, of which 71.46% were Hungarians, 22.9% were Romanians, 2.25% Roma, and 1.04% Csángós. At the 2021 census, Brețcu had a population of 3,132, of which 73.24% were Hungarians and 23.28% were Romanians.

== Personalities ==
- Áron Gábor, hero of the Hungarian Revolution of 1848 was born here in 1814.
