= Zăbala (disambiguation) =

Zăbala may refer to the following places in Romania:

- Zăbala, a commune in Covasna County
- Zăbala (Putna), a tributary of the Putna in Vrancea County
- Zăbala (Râul Negru), a tributary of the Râul Negru in Covasna County
