= Ojdula =

Ojdula Ozsdola
- Commune
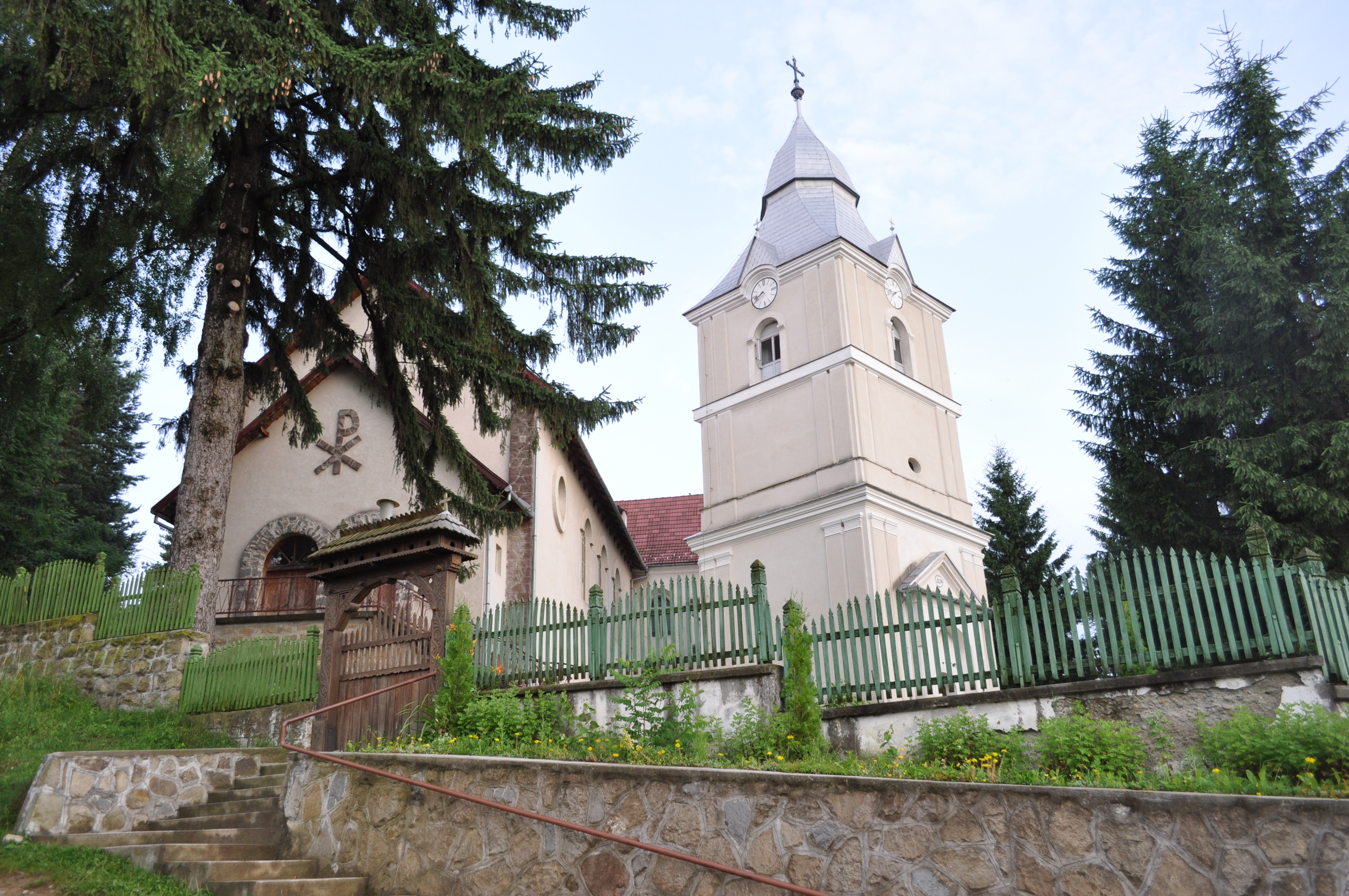
- Catholic church in Ojdula

- Coat of arms

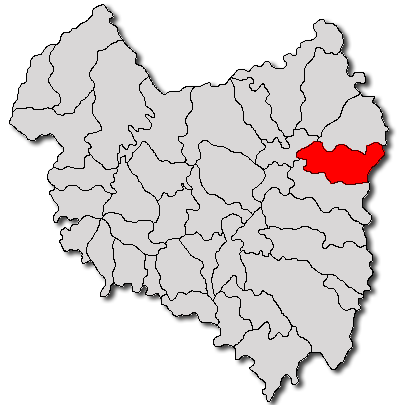
- Location in Covasna County

- Location in Romania
- Coordinates: 45°59′N 26°15′E
- Country: Romania
- County: Covasna

Government
  - Mayor (2020–2024): Ágoston Pénzes (Ind.)
- Area: 112.58 km^{2} (43.47 sq mi)
- Elevation: 608 m (1,995 ft)
- Population (2021-12-01): 3,482
  - Density: 30.93/km^{2} (80.11/sq mi)
- Time zone: UTC+02:00 (EET)
  - Summer (DST): UTC+03:00 (EEST)
- Postal code: 527125
- Area code: (+40) 02 67
- Vehicle reg.: CV
- Website: ozsdola.ro

Ojdula (Hungarian: Ozsdola, Hungarian pronunciation: [ˈoʒdolɒ]) is a commune in Covasna County, Transylvania, Romania composed of two villages: Hilib (Hilib) and Ojdula.

== Geography ==
The commune is situated in a hilly region in the Eastern Carpathians, on the banks of the river Ojdula. It is located in the eastern part of Covasna County, 10 km (6.2 mi) east of Târgu Secuiesc and about 45 km (28 mi) northeast of the county seat, Sfântu Gheorghe, on the border with Vrancea County. Ojdula is crossed by national road DN2D, which runs from Târgu Secuiesc to Focșani.

== Demographics ==
Historical population
Year	Pop.	±%
1850	2,552	—
1920	3,381	+32.5%
1992	3,579	+5.9%
2002	3,520	−1.6%
2011	3,519	−0.0%
2021	3,482	−1.1%
Source: Census data

The commune has an absolute Székely Hungarian majority. At the 2002 census it had a population of 3,520, of which 92.47% or 3,255 are Hungarian. At the 2021 census, Ojdula had a population of 3,482, of which 83.83% were Hungarians, 9.02% Roma, and 4.19% Romanians.

== History ==
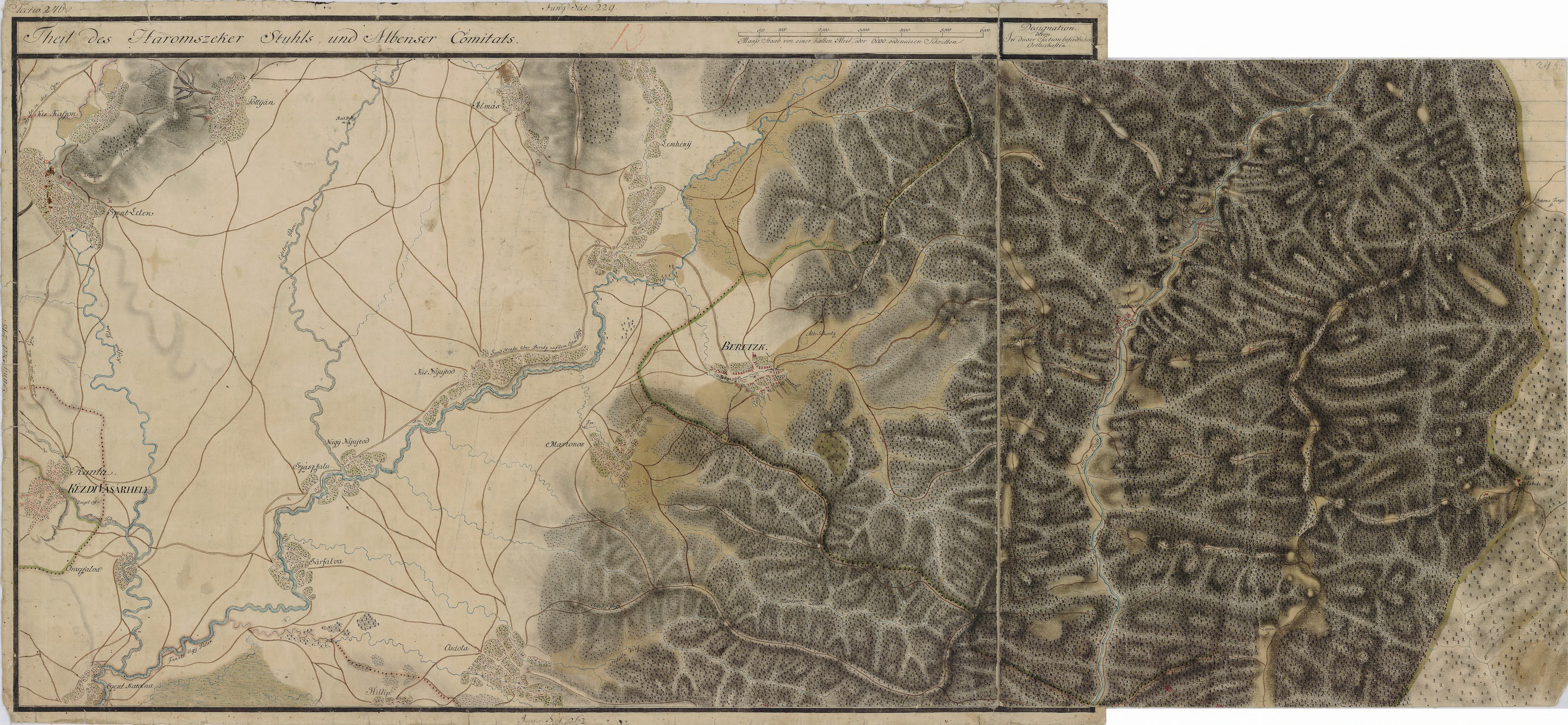
Josephinische Landaufnahme 1769–1773

The locality formed part of the Székely Land region of the historical Transylvania province. Until 1918, the village belonged to the Háromszék County of the Kingdom of Hungary. In the aftermath of World War I, the Union of Transylvania with Romania was declared in December 1918. At the start of the Hungarian–Romanian War of 1918–1919, Ojdula passed under Romanian administration. After the Treaty of Trianon of 1920, it became part of the Kingdom of Romania and fell within plasa Târgu Secuiesc of Trei Scaune County. In 1940, the Second Vienna Award granted Northern Transylvania to the Kingdom of Hungary. In September 1944, during World War II, Romanian and Soviet armies entered the locality. The territory of Northern Transylvania remained under Soviet military administration until March 9, 1945, after which it became again part of Romania. Between 1952 and 1960, Ojdula belonged to the Magyar Autonomous Region, and between 1960 and 1968 it was part of Târgu Secuiesc raion in Brașov Region. In 1968, when Romania was reorganized based on counties rather than regions, the commune became part of Covasna County.
