= Lemnia =

Lemnia Lemhény
- Commune
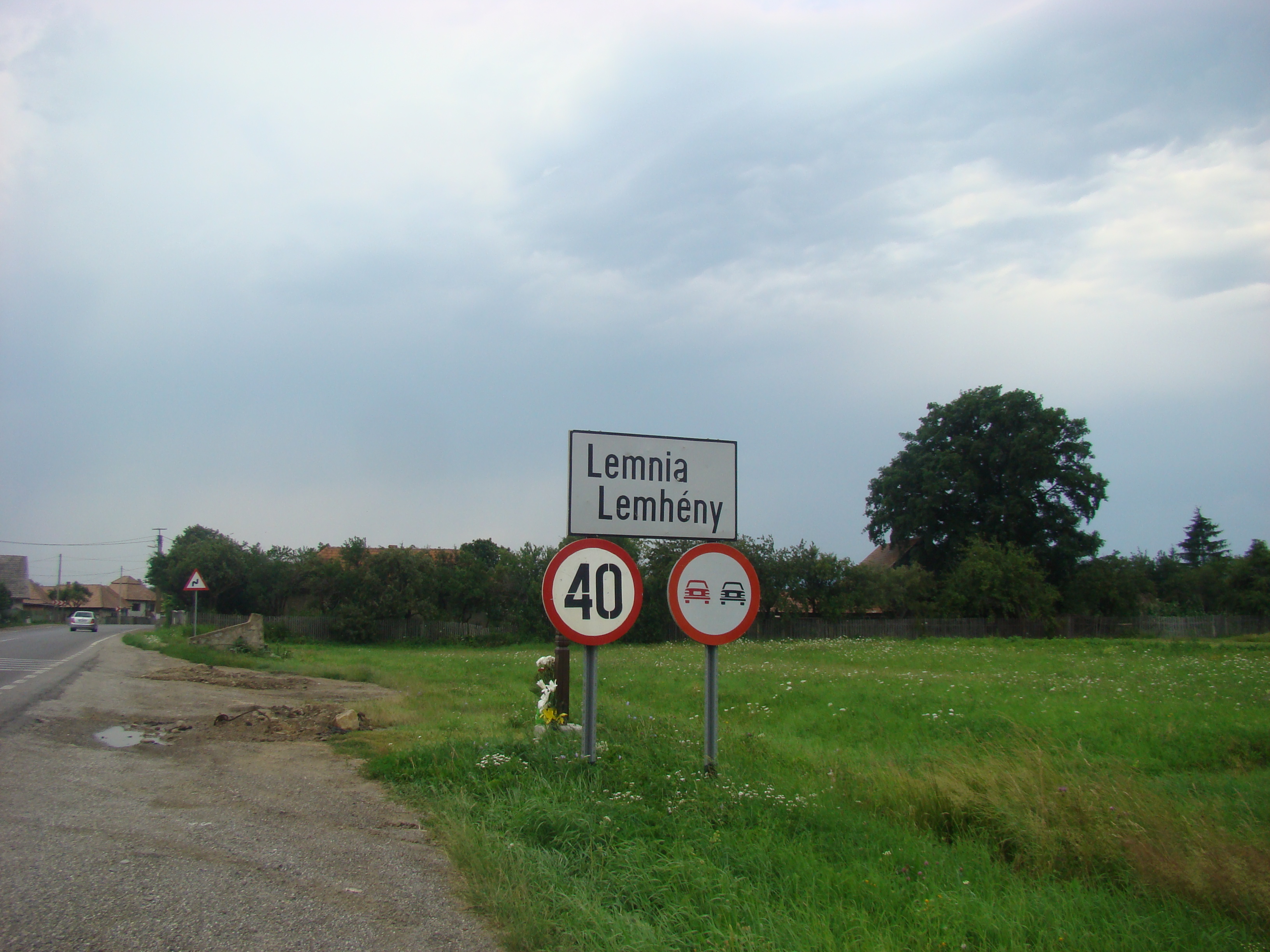
- Entrance to Lemnia

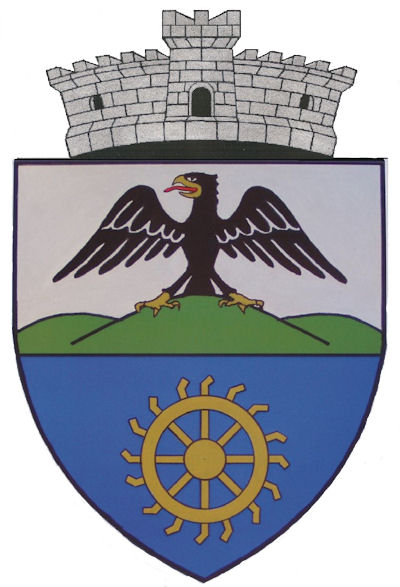
- Coat of arms

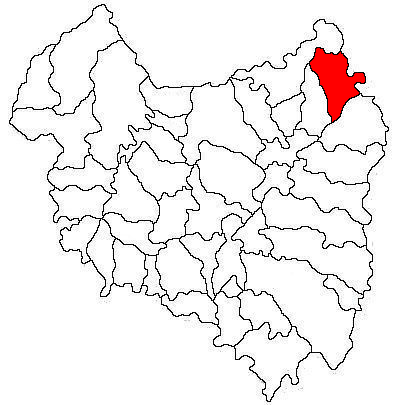
- Location in Covasna County

- Location in Romania
- Coordinates: 46°3′N 26°16′E
- Country: Romania
- County: Covasna

Government
  - Mayor (2020–2024): Csongor Jénáki (UDMR)
- Area: 95.05 km^{2} (36.70 sq mi)
- Elevation: 585 m (1,919 ft)
- Population (2021-12-01): 1,708
  - Density: 17.97/km^{2} (46.54/sq mi)
- Time zone: UTC+02:00 (EET)
  - Summer (DST): UTC+03:00 (EEST)
- Postal code: 527110
- Area code: (+40) 02 67
- Vehicle reg.: CV
- Website: www.lemnia.ro

Lemnia (Hungarian: Lemhény, Hungarian pronunciation: [ˈlɛmheːɲ]; German: Lennen) is a commune in Covasna County, Transylvania, Romania. The commune is composed of a single village, Lemnia. It also included two other villages until 2004, when they were split off to form Mereni Commune.

== Geography ==
The commune is located in the northeastern part of Covasna County, 13 km (8.1 mi) from Târgu Secuiesc and 48 km (30 mi) from the county seat, Sfântu Gheorghe, on the border with Bacău County. Lemnia is situated at an altitude of 585 m (1,919 ft), in the southern foothills of the Nemira Mountains, a mountain range of the Eastern Carpathians. It lies on the banks of Râul Negru and its right tributary, the river Lemnia.

Lemnia is crossed by national road DN11 (part of European route E574), which starts in Brașov, passes through Târgu Secuiesc and Onești, and ends in Bacău.

== History ==
The village formed part of the Székely Land region of the historical Transylvania province. Until 1918, the village belonged to the Háromszék County of the Kingdom of Hungary. In the immediate aftermath of World War I, following the declaration of the Union of Transylvania with Romania, the area passed under Romanian administration, during the Hungarian–Romanian War (1918–1919). By the terms of the Treaty of Trianon of 1920, it became part of the Kingdom of Romania. In 1925, the commune fell in Plasa Târgu Secuiesc of Trei Scaune County.

In August 1940, under the auspices of Nazi Germany, which imposed the Second Vienna Award, Hungary retook the territory of Northern Transylvania (which included Lemnia) from Romania. Towards the end of World War II, however, the commune was taken back from Hungarian and German troops by Romanian and Soviet forces in September–October 1944.

In 1950, after Communist Romania was established, Lemnia became part of the Târgu Secuiesc Raion of Stalin Region. From 1952 and 1960, it was part of the Magyar Autonomous Region, and between 1960 and 1968 it reverted to Brașov Region. In 1968, when Romania was reorganized based on counties rather than regions, the commune became part of Covasna County.

== Demographics ==
Historical population
Year	Pop.	±%
1850	2,587	—
1910	2,943	+13.8%
1941	2,850	−3.2%
1966	1,005	−64.7%
2002	2,044	+103.4%
2011	1,936	−5.3%
2021	1,708	−11.8%
Source: Census data

The commune has an absolute Székely Hungarian majority. According to the 2002 census, it had a population of 2,044, of which 98.43% were Hungarians and 1.51% Romanians. At the 2011 census, there were 1,936 inhabitants, of which 96.23% were Hungarians and 1.76% Romanians. At the 2021 census, Lemnia had a population of 1,708, of which 92.8% were Hungarians, 1.87% Romanians, and 1.29% Roma.
