= Zăbala =

Zăbala Zabola
- Commune
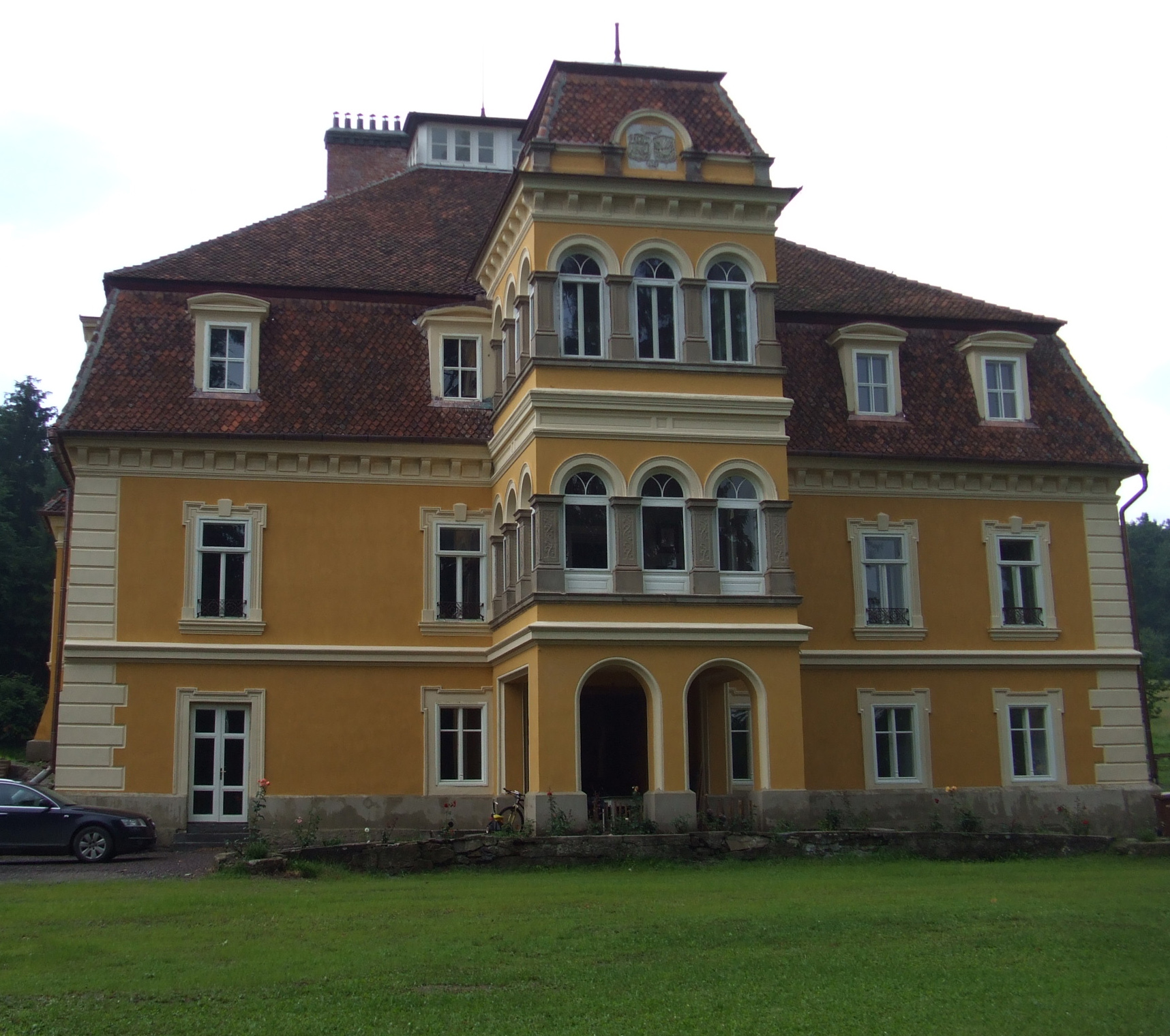
- Mikes Castle

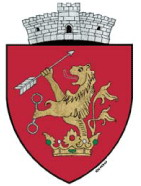
- Coat of arms

- Location in Covasna County

- Location in Romania
- Coordinates: 45°54′N 26°11′E
- Country: Romania
- County: Covasna

Government
  - Mayor (2020–2024): Levente Fejér (UDMR)
- Area: 125.79 km^{2} (48.57 sq mi)
- Elevation: 571 m (1,873 ft)
- Population (2021-12-01): 4,332
  - Density: 34.44/km^{2} (89.19/sq mi)
- Time zone: UTC+02:00 (EET)
  - Summer (DST): UTC+03:00 (EEST)
- Postal code: 527190
- Area code: (+40) 02 67
- Vehicle reg.: CV
- Website: zabola.ro

Zăbala (Hungarian: Zabola, pronounced [ˈzɒbolɒ]; German: Gebissdorf) is a commune in Covasna County, Romania. It lies in the Székely Land, an ethno-cultural region in eastern Transylvania. The commune comprises 4 villages: Peteni (Székelypetőfalva), Surcea (Szörcse), Tamașfalău (Székelytamásfalva), and Zăbala.

== Geography ==
The commune is located in the eastern part of the county, on the border with Vrancea County. It lies on the banks of Râul Negru and its tributaries, the rivers Zăbala and Mărcușa.

Zăbala is crossed by county road DJ121, which connects it to Covasna, 6 km (3.7 mi) to the south, and Târgu Secuiesc, 14.5 km (9 mi) to the north. The county seat, Sfântu Gheorghe, is 39 km (24 mi) to the west.

== Demographics ==
Historical population
Year	Pop.	±%
1850	4,218	—
1920	5,271	+25.0%
1941	5,652	+7.2%
1977	5,150	−8.9%
2002	4,814	−6.5%
2011	4,597	−4.5%
2021	4,332	−5.8%
Source: Census data

The commune has a Székely Hungarian majority. At the 2002 census, it had a population of 4,814, of which 76.55% were Hungarians and 18.82% Romanians. At the 2011 census, there were 4,597 inhabitants; of those, 68.87% were Hungarians, 19.27% Romanians, and 9.03% Roma. At the 2021 census, Zăbala had a population of 4,332, of which 63.67% were Hungarians, 18.37% Romanians, and 11.45% Roma.

== Name ==
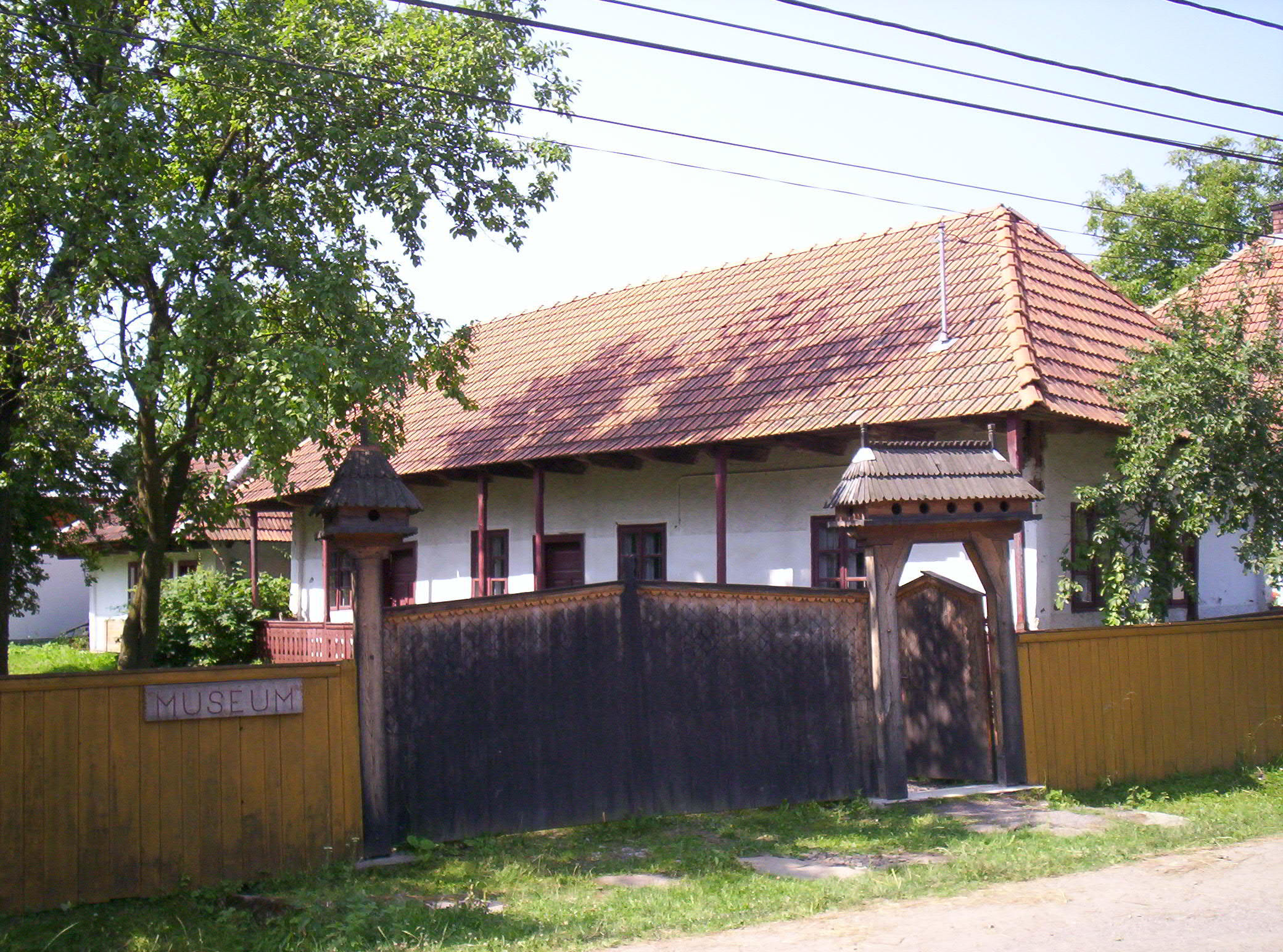
Village Folklore Museum

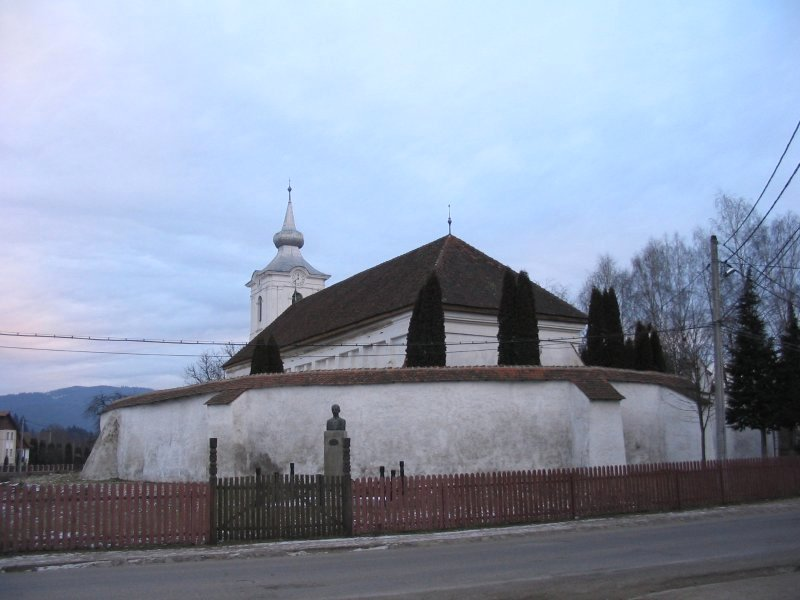
Reformed church

The name of "Zabola" means "bridle", i.e., the straps of leather that are put around the head of a horse to allow the rider to control it.

In the course of various battles with the Tatars, the villages north and south of Zabola were destroyed by the Tatars. However, the inhabitants of Zabola were capable of holding the Tatars in check and survived, as if they had put bridles around the Tatars' horses in order to control them and their riders. Outside the village lies the "Tatárhalom" (Tatar Hill); some historians think the Tatars that were killed in action were buried there.

== History ==
The locality formed part of the Székely Land region of the historical Transylvania province. From 1876 until 1918, the village belonged to the Háromszék County of the Kingdom of Hungary. In the aftermath of World War I, the Union of Transylvania with Romania was declared in December 1918. At the start of the Hungarian–Romanian War of 1918–1919, the town passed under Romanian administration. After the Treaty of Trianon of 1920, it became part of the Kingdom of Romania and fell within plasa Covasna of Trei Scaune County. In 1940, the Second Vienna Award granted Northern Transylvania to the Kingdom of Hungary. In September 1944, during World War II, Romanian and Soviet armies entered the locality. The territory of Northern Transylvania remained under Soviet military administration until March 9, 1945, after which it became again part of Romania. Between 1952 and 1960, Zăbala belonged to the Magyar Autonomous Region, and between 1960 and 1968 it was part of the Brașov Region. In 1968, when Romania was reorganized based on counties rather than regions, the commune became part of Covasna County.

== Notable people ==
- Béla Fejér (born 1995), footballer
- Kelemen Mikes (1690–1761), born in Zagon and grew up in Zabola, in 1690 he became freedom fighter against Habsburg, escaped to Poland, France and at last Turkey. He is referred to as the "Hungarian Goethe" who became famous after writing "Letters from Turkey" in Rodosto where he lived in exile with the Transylvanian Prince Rákóczi until 1761. With his letters from Rodosto, Kelemen Mikes laid the foundations of the Hungarian prosaic literature, and he is regarded as the first Hungarian prosaic author.
- Count Kelemen Mikes (1820–1849), freedom fighter in 1848/1849, became a Hussar colonel, died at the age of 29, hit by the first cannonball fired by the Russian army in 1849. He became a martyr to the Székely resistance movement.
- Count Armin Mikes (1867–1944)
- Count Imre Mikó (1805–1876), minister and reformer
- Emeric Tușa (born 1941), rower

== Things to see ==
- The Mikes Castle and park, which dates back to around 1500. It was once a fortified building with a tower in front. On the first floor all the ceilings are covered with frescoes. The castle in its current form dates back to 1867. It features a 34 ha (84 acres) English park designed by Achille Duchêne.
- The Csángó museum.
