= Ojdula (river) =

- Location within Romania

Location
- Country: Romania
- Counties: Covasna County
- Villages: Ojdula

Physical characteristics
- Mouth: Râul Negru
  - coordinates: 45.9830°N 26.1801°E
- Length: 19 km (12 mi)
- Basin size: 48 km^{2} (19 sq mi)

Basin features
- Progression: Râul Negru→ Olt→ Danube→ Black Sea
- Tributaries
  - right: Orbaiul Mic

The Ojdula (also: Orbai) is a left tributary of the Râul Negru in Romania. It flows into the Râul Negru near the city Târgu Secuiesc. Its length is 19 km (12 mi) and its basin size 48 km^{2} (19 sq mi).
