= Estelnic (river) =

- Location within Romania

Location
- Country: Romania
- Counties: Covasna County
- Villages: Estelnic

Physical characteristics
- Source: Nemira Mountains
- Mouth: Râul Negru
  - location: near Târgu Secuiesc
  - coordinates: 46.0050°N 26.1995°E

Basin features
- Progression: Râul Negru→ Olt→ Danube→ Black Sea
- Tributaries
  - left: Lutoasa
  - right: Valea Scurtă

The Estelnic is a right tributary of the Râul Negru in Romania. It flows into the Râul Negru near the village Lunga, east of Târgu Secuiesc. Its length is 20 km (12 mi) and its basin size is 89 km^{2} (34 sq mi).
