= Catalina, Covasna =

Catalina Szentkatolna
- Commune
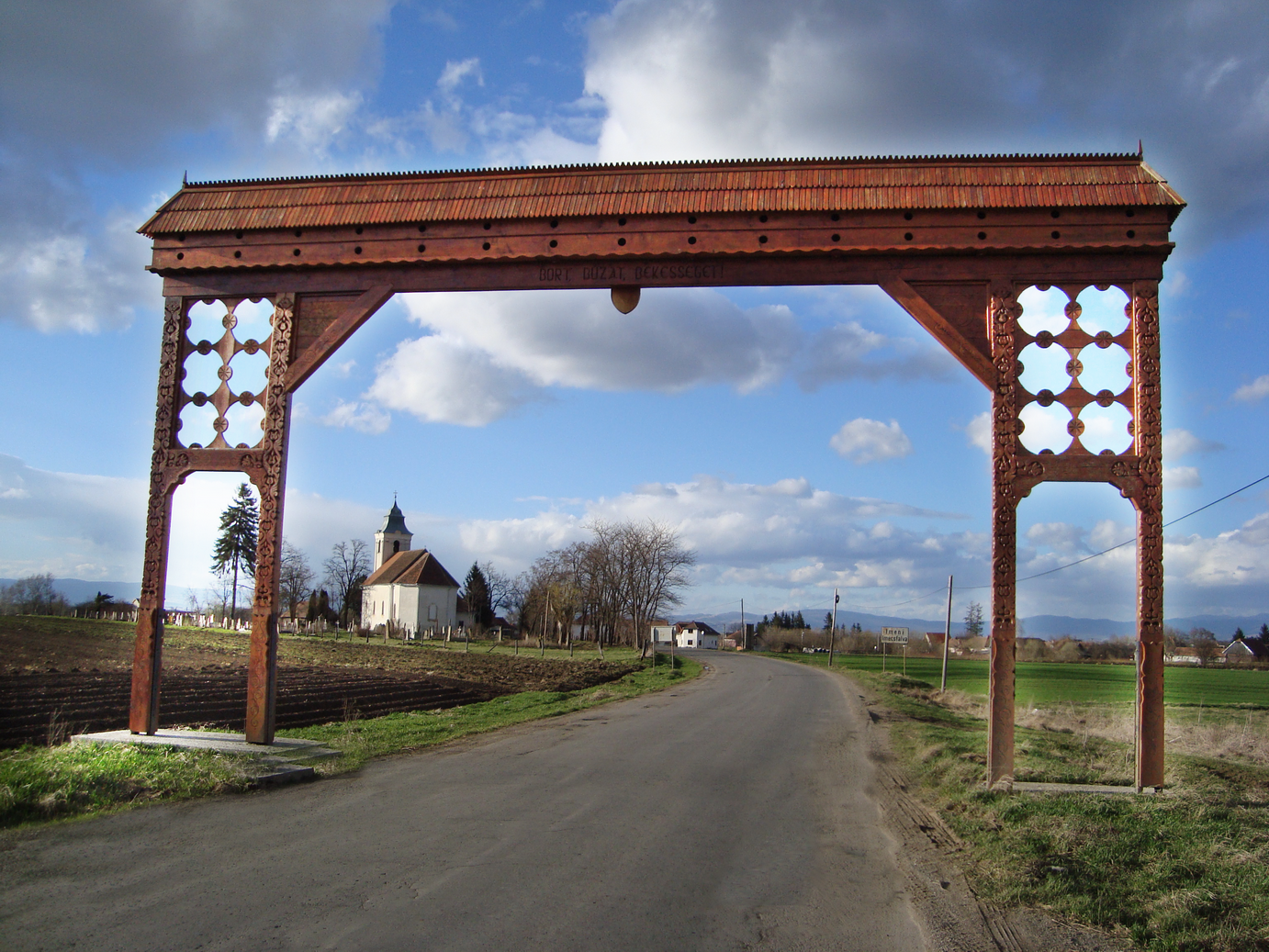
- Entrance to Catalina

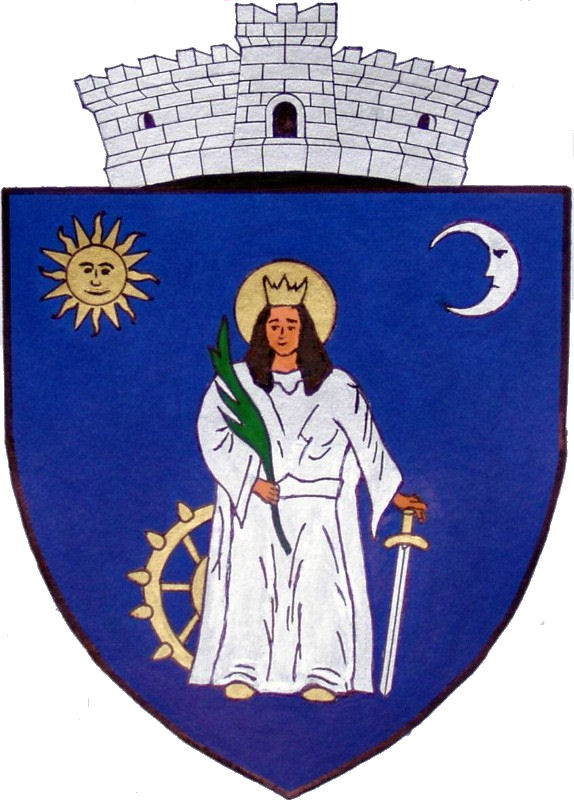
- Coat of arms

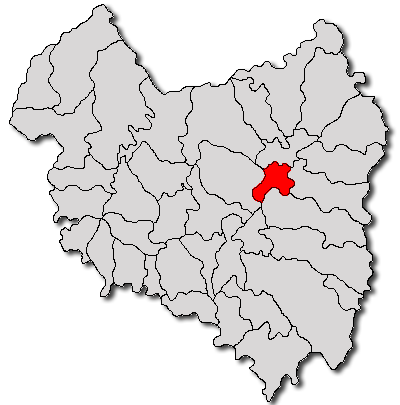
- Location in Covasna County

- Location in Romania
- Coordinates: 45°58′N 26°9′E
- Country: Romania
- County: Covasna
- Subdivisions: Catalina, Hătuica, Imeni, Mărcușa, Mărtineni

Government
  - Mayor (2020–2024): Levente Tusa (UDMR)
- Area: 46.45 km^{2} (17.93 sq mi)
- Elevation: 551 m (1,808 ft)
- Population (2021-12-01): 3,200
  - Density: 69/km^{2} (180/sq mi)
- Time zone: UTC+02:00 (EET)
  - Summer (DST): UTC+03:00 (EEST)
- Postal code: 527065
- Area code: (+40) 02 67
- Vehicle reg.: CV
- Website: www.szentkatolna.ro

Catalina (Hungarian: Szentkatolna, Hungarian pronunciation: [ˈsɛntkɒtolnɒ]) is a commune in Covasna County, Transylvania, Romania, composed of five villages: Catalina, Hătuica (Hatolyka), Imeni (Imecsfalva), Mărcușa (Kézdimárkosfalva), and Mărtineni (Kézdimártonfalva).

== Geography ==
The commune is located in the east-central part of Covasna County, just south of Târgu Secuiesc and 35 km (22 mi) northeast of the county seat, Sfântu Gheorghe. It lies at an altitude of 551 m (1,808 ft), on the banks of Râul Negru and its tributaries, the rivers Cașin and Ghelința. Catalina is crossed by county roads DJ121, which connects the town of Covasna, 15 km (9.3 mi) to the south, to Târgu Secuiesc, and DJ121F, which connects it to Cernat, 13 km (8.1 mi) to the west.

== History ==
The settlement formed part of the Székely Land region of the historical Transylvania province. Until 1918, it belonged to the Háromszék County of the Kingdom of Hungary. In the immediate aftermath of World War I, following the declaration of the Union of Transylvania with Romania, the area passed under Romanian administration during the Hungarian–Romanian War of 1918–1919. By the terms of the Treaty of Trianon of 1920, it became part of the Kingdom of Romania. In 1925, the commune fell in Plasa Târgu Secuiesc of Trei Scaune County. In August 1940, under the auspices of Nazi Germany, which imposed the Second Vienna Award, Hungary retook the territory of Northern Transylvania (which included Catalina) from Romania. Towards the end of World War II, however, the commune was taken back from Hungarian and German troops by Romanian and Soviet forces in September–October 1944. In 1950, after Communist Romania was established, Brateș became part of the Târgu Secuiesc Raion of Stalin Region. From 1952 and 1960, it was part of the Magyar Autonomous Region, and between 1960 and 1968 it reverted to Brașov Region. In 1968, when Romania was reorganized based on counties rather than regions, the commune became part of Covasna County.

== Natives ==
- Benedek Bálint (1860–1920), graphic designer
- Gábor Bálint (1844–1913), linguist
- Gabriel Kicsid (born 1948), handball player
- Vasile Luca (1898–1963), communist politician

== Demographics ==
Historical population
| Year | Pop. | ±% |
|---|---|---|
| 1850 | 3,636 | — |
| 1930 | 3,236 | −11.0% |
| 1956 | 3,736 | +15.5% |
| 2002 | 3,541 | −5.2% |
| 2011 | 3,378 | −4.6% |
| 2021 | 3,200 | −5.3% |
Source: Census data

The commune has an absolute Székely Hungarian majority. According to the 2011 census, it had a population of 3,378, of which 97.9% were Hungarians and 1.04% Romanians. At the 2021 census, Catalina had a population of 3,200, of which 90.34% were Hungarian, 4.78% Roma, and 1.72% Romanians.
