= Lisnău =

- Location within Romania

Location
- Country: Romania
- Counties: Covasna County
- Villages: Lisnău-Vale, Lisnău

Physical characteristics
- Mouth: Râul Negru
  - coordinates: 45.7655°N 25.8395°E
- Length: 11 km (6.8 mi)
- Basin size: 23 km^{2} (8.9 sq mi)

Basin features
- Progression: Râul Negru→ Olt→ Danube→ Black Sea

The Lisnău is a left tributary of the Râul Negru in Romania. It flows into the Râul Negru near Lunca Ozunului. Its length is 11 km (6.8 mi) and its basin size is 23 km^{2} (8.9 sq mi).
