= Brețcu (river) =

- Location within Romania

Location
- Country: Romania
- Counties: Covasna County
- Villages: Brețcu

Physical characteristics
- Source: Nemira Mountains
- Mouth: Râul Negru
  - location: near Lunga
  - coordinates: 46.0328°N 26.2438°E
- Length: 13 km (8.1 mi)
- Basin size: 47 km^{2} (18 sq mi)

Basin features
- Progression: Râul Negru→ Olt→ Danube→ Black Sea
- Tributaries
  - left: Pârâul Întortochiat, Mărtănuș

The Brețcu (Hungarian: Bereck) is a left tributary of the Râul Negru in Romania. The 13 km (8.1 mi) long river flows into the Râul Negru east of Lunga. Its basin size is 47 km^{2} (18 sq mi).
