= Mărcușa =

Mărcușa Cernat
- Location within Romania

Location
- Country: Romania
- Counties: Covasna County
- Villages: Cernat, Mărcușa

Physical characteristics
- Mouth: Râul Negru
  - coordinates: 45.8868°N 26.0776°E
- Length: 24 km (15 mi)
- Basin size: 89 km^{2} (34 sq mi)

Basin features
- Progression: Râul Negru→ Olt→ Danube→ Black Sea

The Mărcușa (also: Cernat) is a right tributary of the Râul Negru in Romania. It flows into the Râul Negru between the villages Mărcușa and Surcea. Its length is 24 km (15 mi) and its basin size is 89 km^{2} (34 sq mi).

== Tributaries ==
The following rivers are tributaries to the river Mărcușa (from source to mouth):

- Left: Lunca (Retiul)
- Right: Pârâul Întunecat, Groapa Pietroasă, Pârâul Rupt, Bortofălău, Pârâul Mic, Albiș
