= Râul Negru =

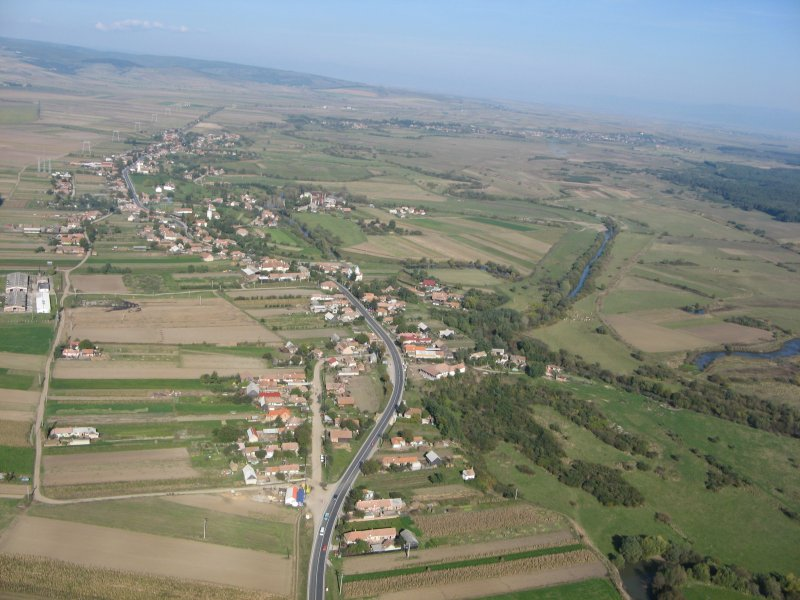

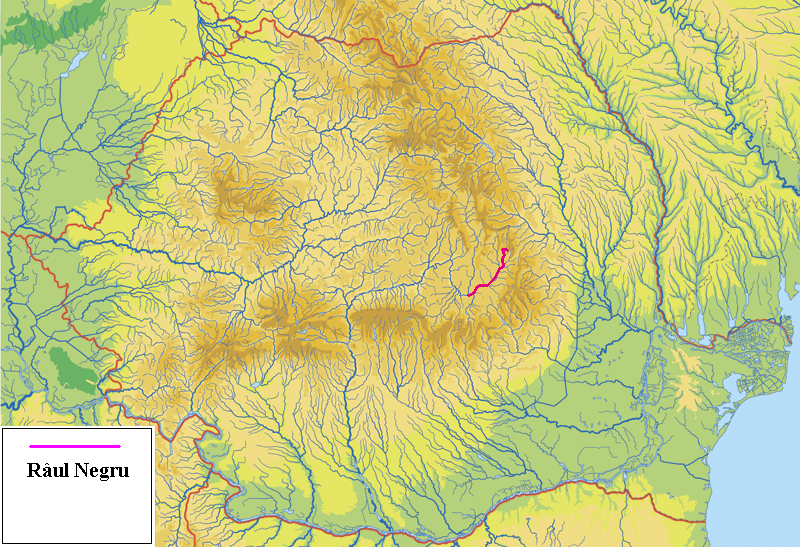

Location
- Country: Romania
- Counties: Covasna, Brașov

Physical characteristics
- Source: Nemira Mountains
- Mouth: Olt
  - location: Lunca Câlnicului
  - coordinates: 45.7603°N 25.7567°E
- Length: 88 km (55 mi)
- Basin size: 2,349 km^{2} (907 sq mi)

Basin features
- Progression: Olt→ Danube→ Black Sea
- Tributaries
  - left: Ghelința, Covasna, Tărlung
  - right: Cașin

The Râul Negru (Hungarian: Feketeügy; literally meaning "Black River") is a left tributary of the river Olt in Romania. It joins the Olt in Lunca Câlnicului. The Râul Negru flows through the villages Lemnia, Lunga, Catalina, Hătuica, Surcea, Telechia, Bita, Reci, Sântionlunca, Ozun, Băcel, Chichiș and Lunca Câlnicului. Its length is 88 km (55 mi) and its basin size is 2,349 km^{2} (907 sq mi).

== Tributaries ==
The following rivers are tributaries to the Râul Negru (from source to mouth):

- Left: Pârâul Mare, Brețcu, Stânca Uriașului, Capolna, Ojdula, Pârâul Racilor, Ghelința, Borviz, Zăbala, Fundul Pârâului, Covasna, Pârâul Beldii, Lisnău, Pârâul Satului, Tărlung
- Right: Lemnia, Estelnic, Cașin, Mărtineni, Mărcușa, Dalnic, Pădureni, Reci, Angheluș
