= Cohors I Bracaraugustanorum eq c.R. =

Cohors I Bracaraugustanorum quingenaria equitata civium Romanorum
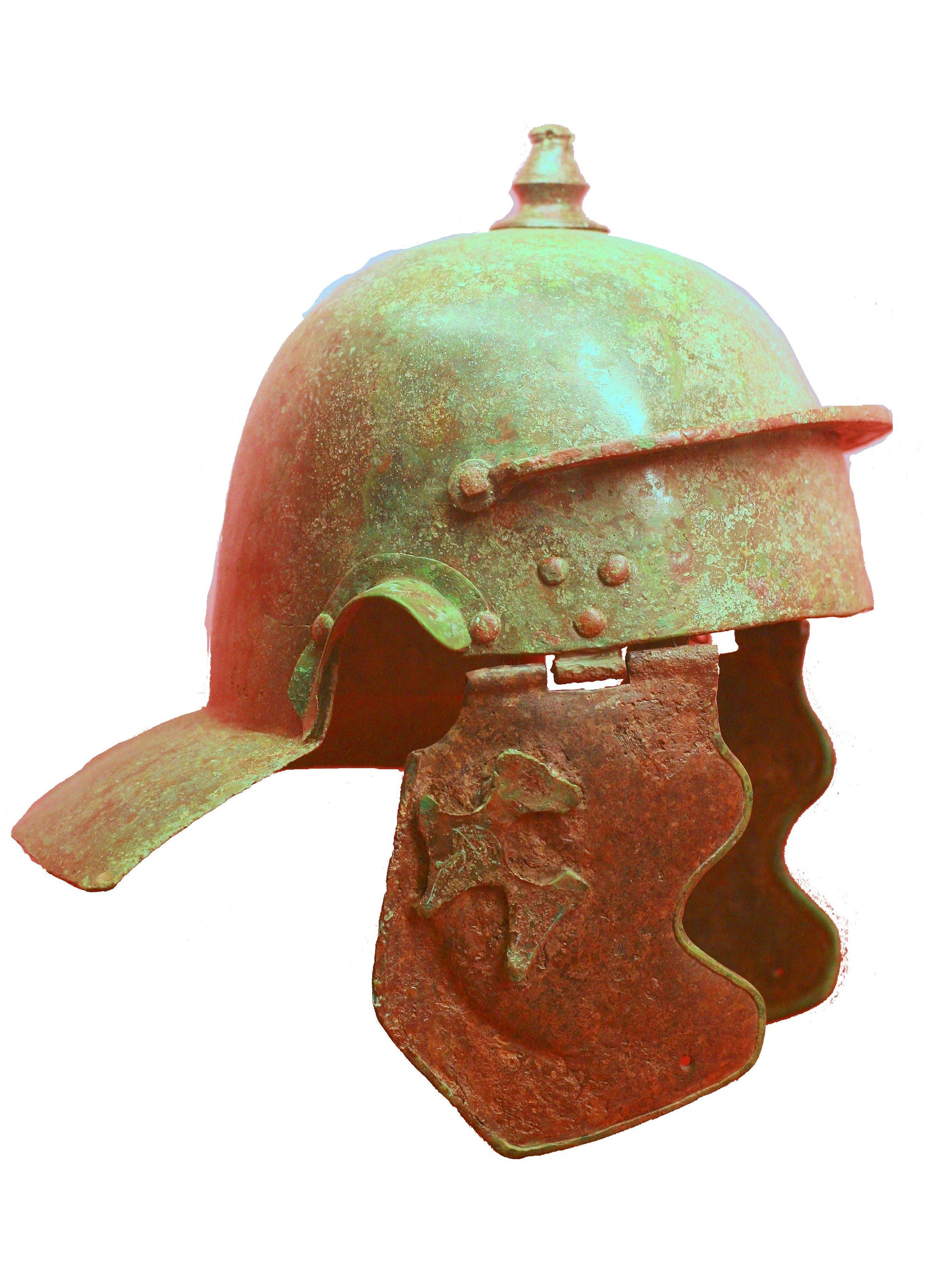
- Roman infantry helmet (late 1st century)
- Active: ?
- Country: Roman Empire
- Type: Roman auxiliary cohort
- Role: infantry/cavalry
- Size: 500 men (380 infantry, 120 cavalry)

Cohors [prima] Bracaraugustanorum [quingenaria] equitata civium Romanorum ("[1st] part-mounted [500 strong] cohort of Roman citizens Bracari") was a Roman auxiliary regiment containing cavalry contingents. The cohort stationed in Dacia at castra Angustia and castra of Boroșneu Mare.

== See also ==
- List of Roman auxiliary regiments
