= Ghelința (river) =

- Location within Romania

Location
- Country: Romania
- Counties: Covasna County
- Villages: Ghelința, Imeni

Physical characteristics
- Mouth: Râul Negru
  - location: Imeni
  - coordinates: 45.9467°N 26.1560°E
- Length: 21 km (13 mi)
- Basin size: 99 km^{2} (38 sq mi)

Basin features
- Progression: Râul Negru→ Olt→ Danube→ Black Sea
- Tributaries
  - left: Iacu
  - right: Baba, Ghelința Mică

The Ghelința is a left tributary of the river Râul Negru in Romania. It discharges into the Râul Negru in Imeni. Its length is 21 km (13 mi) and its basin size is 99 km^{2} (38 sq mi).
