= Angustia (castra) =

- Castra of Brețcu; Angustiae
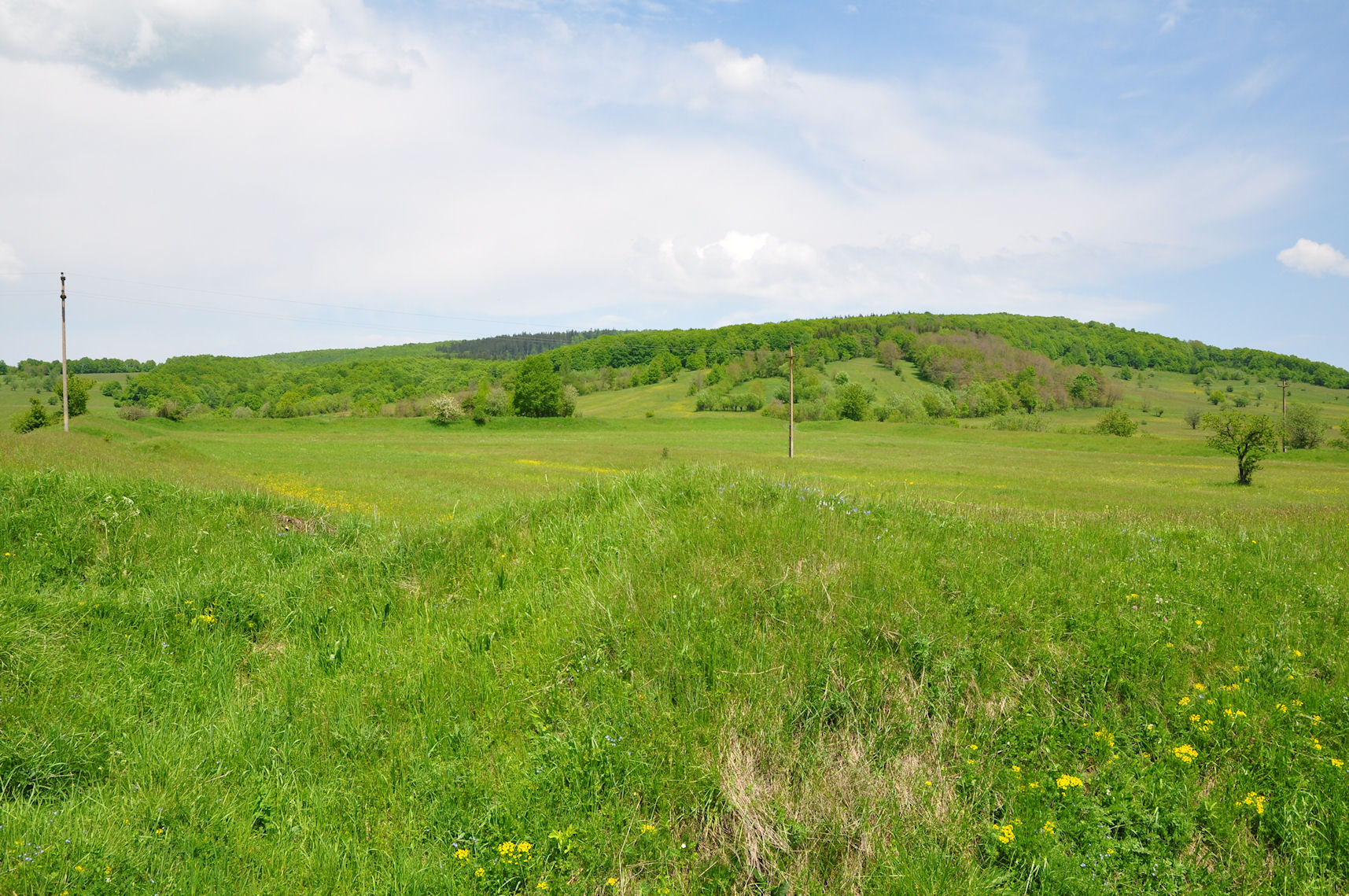
- Panoramic view

- Location within Romania
- 46.050994°N 26.312836°E
- Location: Cetatea Lupului, Brețcu, Romania

History
- Founded: 2nd century AD
- Abandoned: 3rd century AD

Site notes
- Elevation: 615 m (2,018 ft)
- Excavation dates: 1877, 1925 - 1926, 1950, 2010
- Archaeologists: Emil Panaitescu; Mihail Macrea
- Condition: Ruined

Angustia was a fort in the Roman province of Dacia in the 2nd and 3rd centuries AD today near the town of Breţcu, Romania.

It was the key centre for defence of the eastern half of Roman Dacia as it controlled the vulnerable Oituz Pass.

It was remote and at least 200km from the so-called Imperial Road, the backbone of the Roman communication system connecting Drobeta (on the Danube) to Porolissum. The main routes for supplying this strategic fort from the eastern frontier eventually collapsed one by one and the remaining route along the Alutus was 472 km.

Its garrison was Cohors I Bracaraugustanorum.

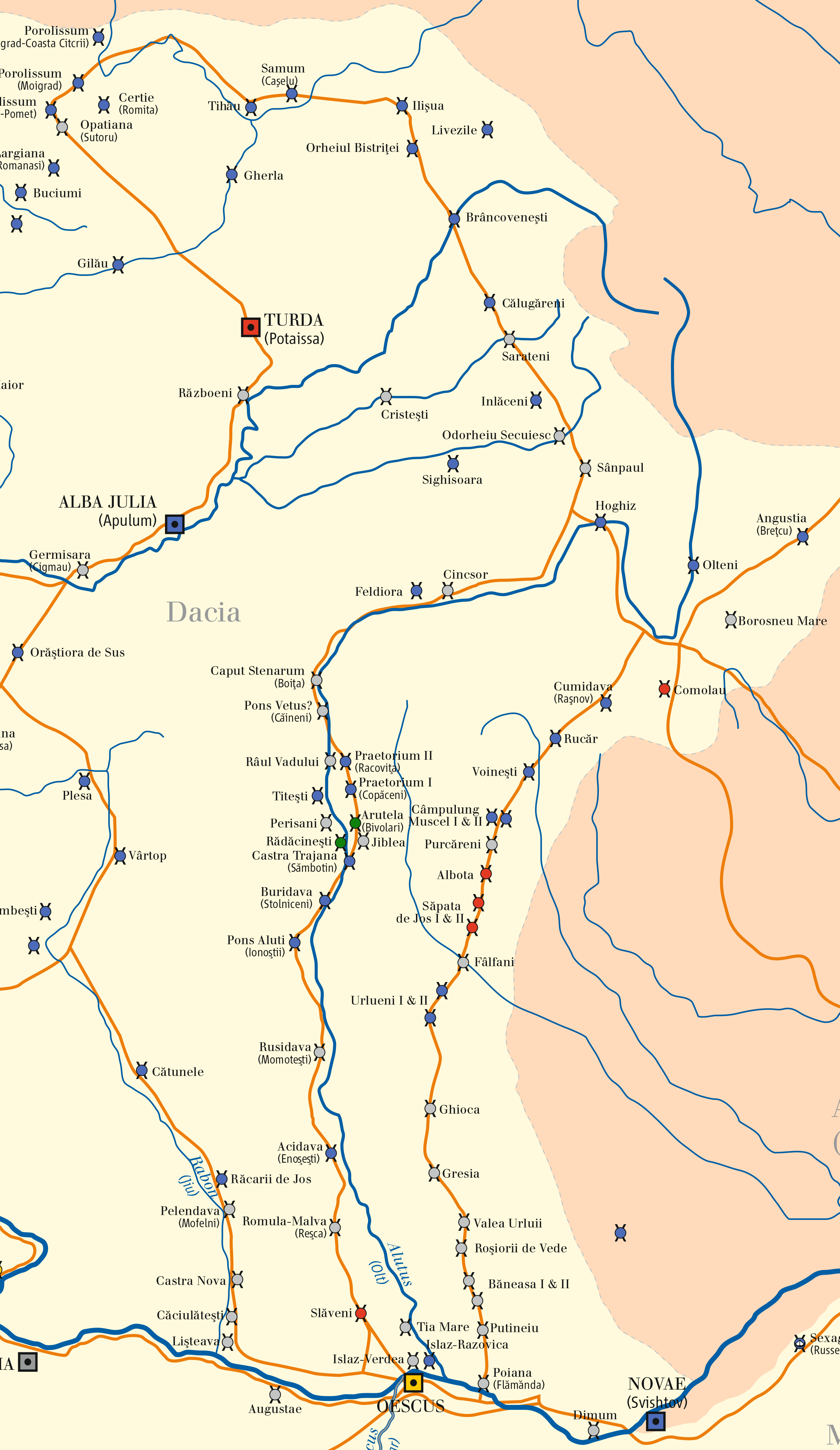
Eastern Dacian Limes

The plan of castra, after Nicolae Gudea

== Bibliography ==
- Nicolae Gudea: Castrul roman de la Breţcu. In: Acta Musei Porolissensis 4, 1980, 255-334.
- Dumitru Protase: Angvstia (Breţcu). In: Angustia 1, 1996, 85-88.
- Nicolae Gudea: Der Dakische Limes. Materialien zu seiner Geschichte. In: Jahrbuch des Römisch-Germanischen Zentralmuseums Mainz. 44, 2, 1997, 62–63 PDF.
