= Pădureni (Râul Negru) =

- Location within Romania

Location
- Country: Romania
- Counties: Covasna County

Physical characteristics
- Mouth: Râul Negru
  - coordinates: 45.8344°N 25.9641°E
- Length: 24 km (15 mi)
- Basin size: 53 km^{2} (20 sq mi)

Basin features
- Progression: Râul Negru→ Olt→ Danube→ Black Sea
- River code: VIII.1.45.17

The Pădureni is a right tributary of the Râul Negru in Romania. It discharges into the Râul Negru near Bita. Its length is 24 km (15 mi) and its basin size is 53 km^{2} (20 sq mi).
