= Lemnia (river) =

- Location within Romania

Location
- Country: Romania
- Counties: Covasna County
- Villages: Lemnia

Physical characteristics
- Mouth: Râul Negru
  - location: Lemnia
  - coordinates: 46.0378°N 26.2589°E
- Length: 13 km (8.1 mi)
- Basin size: 35 km^{2} (14 sq mi)

Basin features
- Progression: Râul Negru→ Olt→ Danube→ Black Sea
- Tributaries
  - left: Tisa

The Lemnia is a right tributary of the Râul Negru in Romania. It flows into the Râul Negru near the village Lemnia. Its length is 13 km (8.1 mi) and its basin size is 35 km^{2} (14 sq mi).
