= Áron Gábor =

Hungarian revolutionary

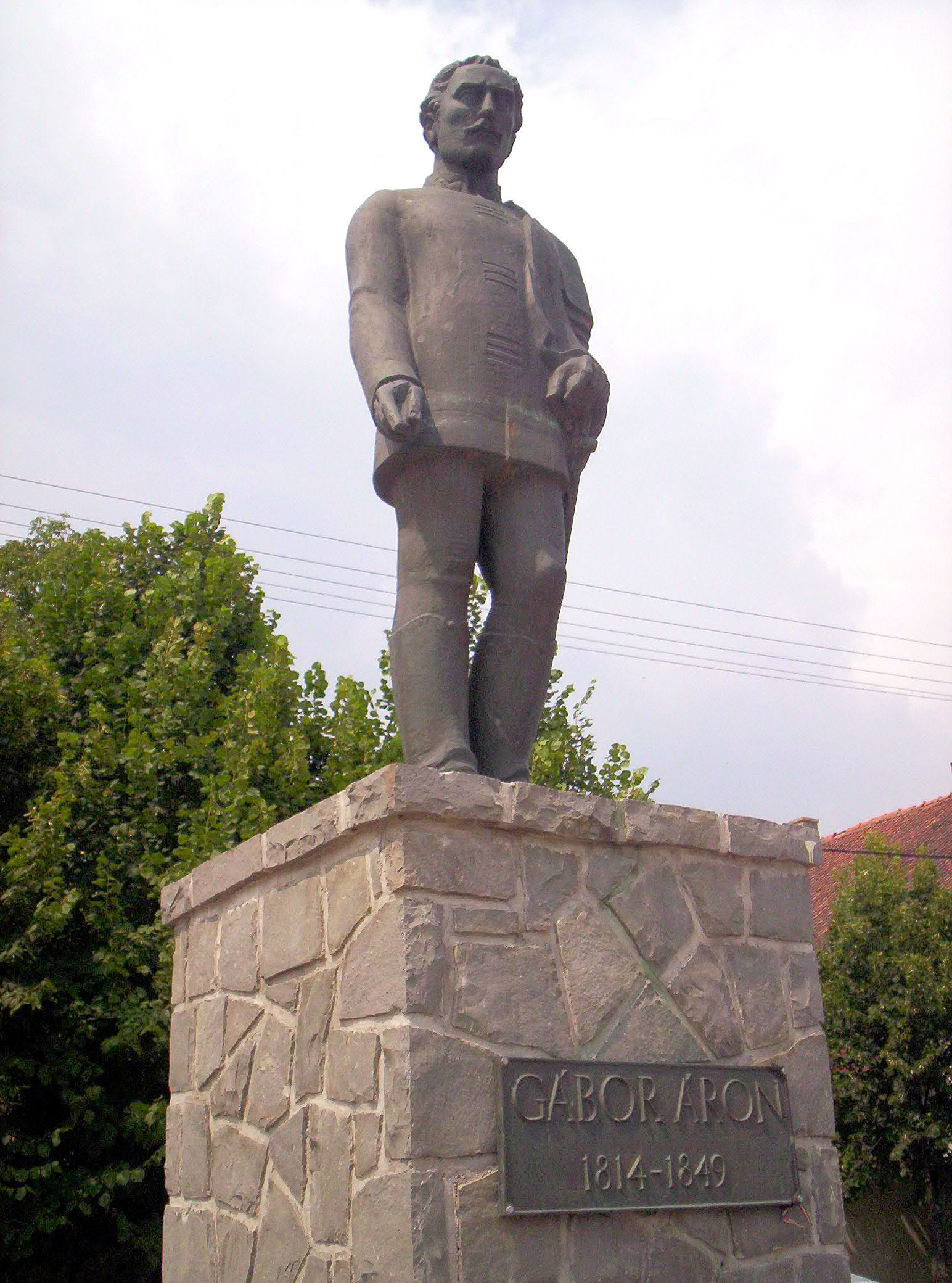
Statue in Brețcu, where Gábor was born

Áron Gábor (27 November 1814 – 2 July 1849) was a Székely Hungarian artillery officer in the 1848-49 Hungarian Revolution. He became one of the leaders of Székely-Hungarian forces in Transylvania during the 1848 revolution against the Austrian Empire.
