= Zăbala (Râul Negru) =

- Location within Romania

Location
- Country: Romania
- Counties: Covasna County
- Villages: Zăbala, Tamașfalău

Physical characteristics
- Mouth: Râul Negru
  - coordinates: 45.8942°N 26.0860°E
- Length: 16 km (9.9 mi)
- Basin size: 37 km^{2} (14 sq mi)

Basin features
- Progression: Râul Negru→ Olt→ Danube→ Black Sea

The Zăbala is a left tributary of the Râul Negru in Romania. It flows into the Râul Negru near Surcea. Its length is 16 km (9.9 mi) and its basin size is 37 km^{2} (14 sq mi).
