= Ozun =

Ozun Uzon
- Commune
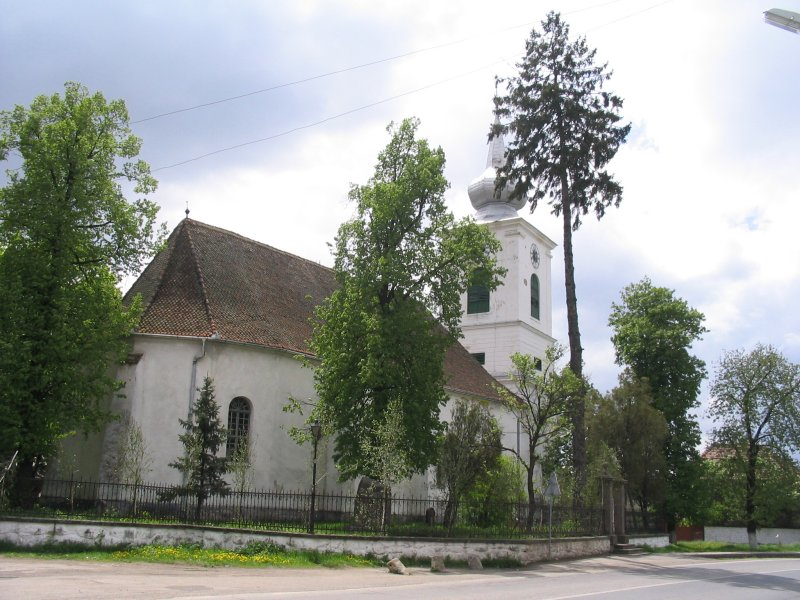
- Reformed church in Ozun

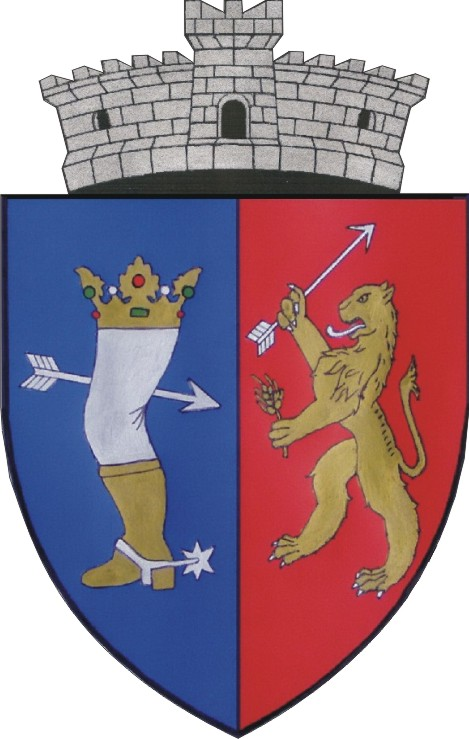
- Coat of arms

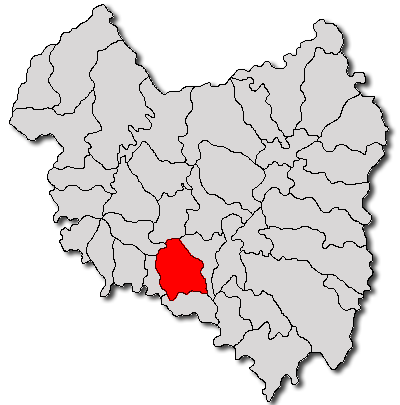
- Location in Covasna County

- Location in Romania
- Coordinates: 45°48′N 25°51′E
- Country: Romania
- County: Covasna

Government
  - Mayor (2021–2024): Enikő Bordás (UDMR)
- Area: 82.66 km^{2} (31.92 sq mi)
- Elevation: 515 m (1,690 ft)
- Population (2021-12-01): 4,213
  - Density: 50.97/km^{2} (132.0/sq mi)
- Time zone: UTC+02:00 (EET)
  - Summer (DST): UTC+03:00 (EEST)
- Postal code: 527130
- Area code: (+40) 02 67
- Vehicle reg.: CV
- Website: ozun.ro

Ozun (Hungarian: Uzon, Hungarian pronunciation: [ˈuzon]; German: Usendorf) is a commune in Covasna County, Transylvania, Romania composed of seven villages: Bicfalău (Bikfalva), Lisnău (Lisznyó), Lisnău-Vale (Lisznyópatak), Lunca Ozunului (Vesszőstelep), Măgheruș (Sepsimagyarós), Ozun, and Sântionlunca (Szentivánlaborfalva).

== Demographics ==
Historical population
Year	Pop.	±%
1850	4,985	—
1920	5,883	+18.0%
1941	5,547	−5.7%
1977	5,029	−9.3%
2002	4,575	−9.0%
2011	4,430	−3.2%
2021	4,213	−4.9%
Source: Census data

The commune has an absolute Székely Hungarian majority. According to the 2011 census, it had a population of 4,430 of which 82.71% or 3,664 were Hungarians, 11.6% or 514 were Romanians, 2.93% or 130 were Roma, and 0.11% or 5 were part of another ethnic group. At the 2021 census, Ozun had a population of 4,213, of which 79.47% were Hungarians, 12.58% Romanians, and 1.02% Roma.

== History ==
The settlement formed part of the Székely Land region of the historical Transylvania province. Until 1918, the village belonged to the Háromszék County of the Kingdom of Hungary. In the immediate aftermath of World War I, following the declaration of the Union of Transylvania with Romania, the area passed under Romanian administration during the Hungarian–Romanian War of 1918–1919. By the terms of the Treaty of Trianon of 1920, it became part of the Kingdom of Romania.

In 1925, the commune fell within Plasa Ozun of Trei Scaune County. In August 1940, under the auspices of Nazi Germany, which imposed the Second Vienna Award, Hungary retook the territory of Northern Transylvania (which included Ozun) from Romania. Towards the end of World War II, however, the commune was taken back from Hungarian and German troops by Romanian and Soviet forces in September 1944.

In 1950, after Communist Romania was established, Ozun became part of the Sfântu Gheorghe Raion of Stalin Region. From 1952 and 1960, it was part of the Magyar Autonomous Region, and between 1960 and 1968 it reverted to Brașov Region. In 1968, when Romania was reorganized based on counties rather than regions, the commune became part of Covasna County.
