= Trei Scaune County =

Județul Trei Scaune
- County (Județ)
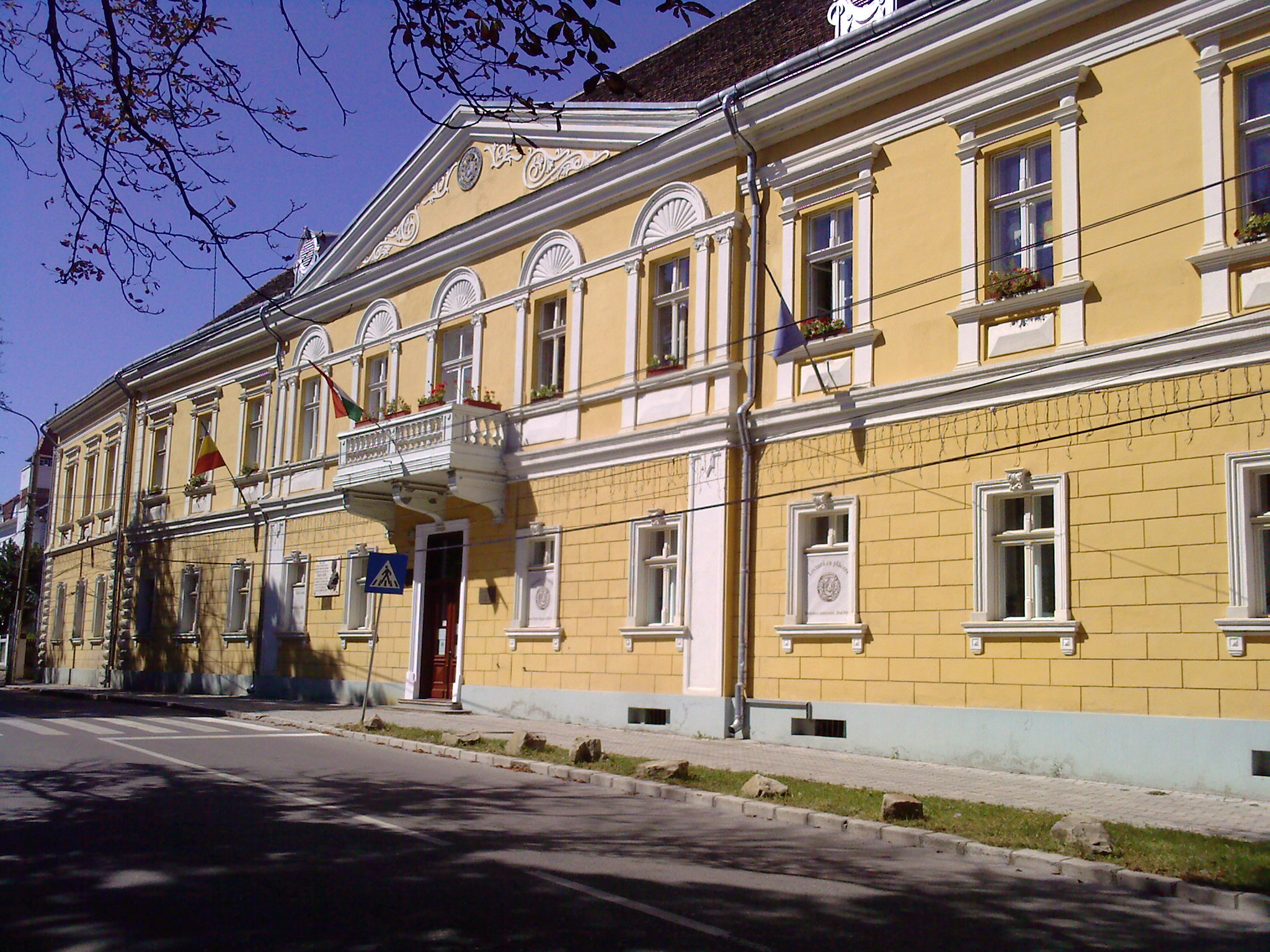
- Trei Scaune County prefecture building during the interwar period, currently Covasna County library in Sfântu Gheorghe.

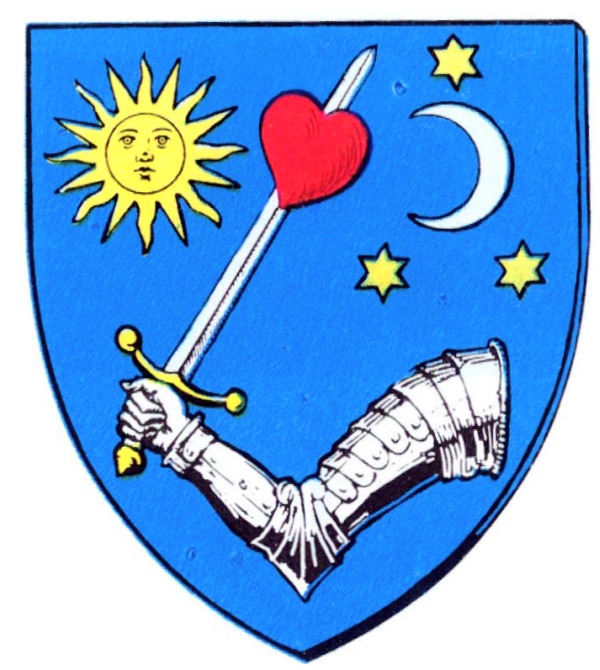
- Coat of arms

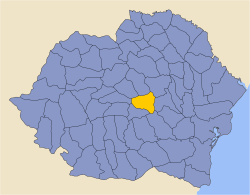
- Country: Romania
- Historic region: Transylvania
- Capital city (Reședință de județ): Sfântu Gheorghe
- Established: 1925
- Disestablished by the 1938 Constitution of Romania: 27 February 1938
- Re-established: 1945
- Ceased to exist: Administrative reform of 1950

Area
  - Total: 3,337 km^{2} (1,288 sq mi)

Population (1930)
  - Total: 136,122
  - Density: 40.79/km^{2} (105.7/sq mi)
- Time zone: UTC+2 (EET)
  - Summer (DST): UTC+3 (EEST)

Trei Scaune County is one of the historical counties of the Kingdom of Romania, in the historical region of Transylvania. The county seat was Sfântu Gheorghe.

== Geography ==
The county covered 3,337 km^{2} (1,288 sq mi) and was located in the central part of Greater Romania, in the southeast of Transylvania. Its territory comprised a large part of the current territory of Covasna County.

It was bordered west by Brașov County, to the north by the counties of Odorhei, Ciuc, and Bacău, to the east by Putna County, and to the south by Buzău County. The county was disbanded with the administrative reform of 6 September 1950.

== History ==
Prior to World War I, the territory of the county belonged to Austria-Hungary and mostly was identical with the Háromszék County of the Kingdom of Hungary. The territory of Trei Scaune County was transferred to Romania from Hungary as successor state to Austria-Hungary in 1920 under the Treaty of Trianon. After the administrative unification law in 1925, the name of the county remained as it was, but the territory was reorganized.

In 1938, King Carol II promulgated a new Constitution, and subsequently he had the administrative division of the Romanian territory changed. 10 ținuturi (approximate translation: "lands") were created (by merging the counties) to be ruled by rezidenți regali (approximate translation: "Royal Residents") — appointed directly by the King — instead of the prefects. Trei Scaune County became part of Ținutul Argeș.

In 1940, nearly all of the county was transferred back to Hungary with the rest of Northern Transylvania under the Second Vienna Award; the small remainder was added to Putna County and to Brașov County. In September–October 1944, Romanian forces with Soviet assistance recaptured the ceded territory and reintegrated it into Romania, re-establishing the county. Romanian jurisdiction over the entire county per the Treaty of Trianon was reaffirmed in the Paris Peace Treaties, 1947. The county was disestablished by the communist government of Romania in 1950 and its territory became part of the Stalin Region. Trei Scaune County was not re-established in 1968 when Romania restored the county administrative system.

== Administrative organization ==
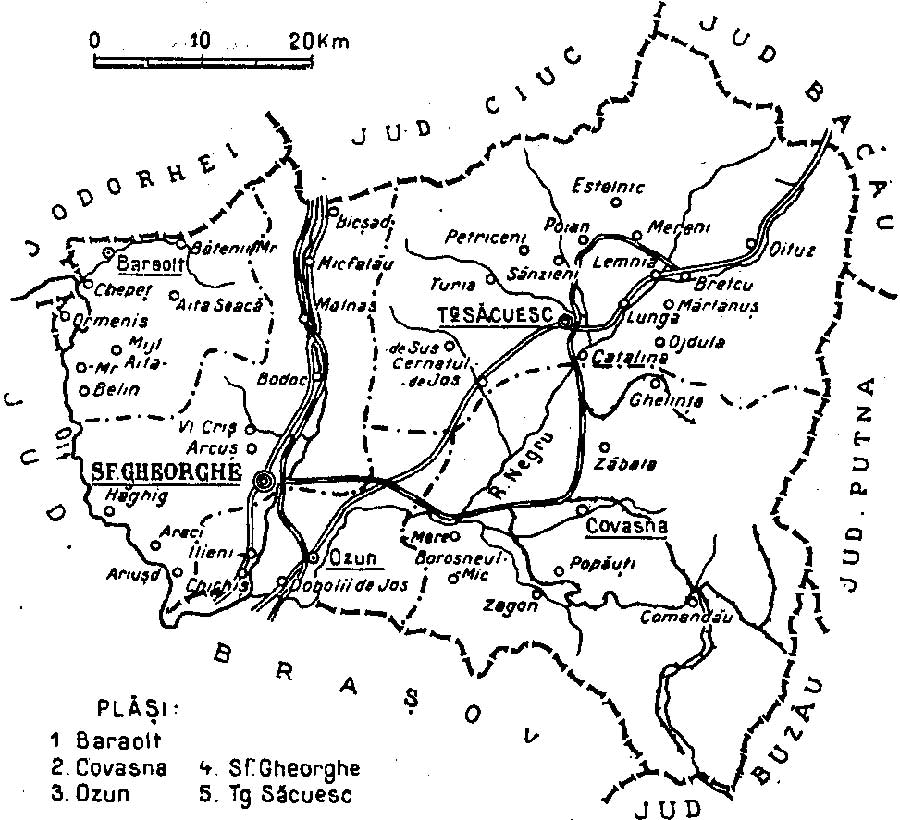
Map of Trei Scaune County as constituted in 1938.

Administratively, Trei Scaune County was divided originally into four districts (plăși):

1. Plasa Baraolt, headquartered at Baraolt, containing 11 villages
2. Plasa Covasna, headquartered at Covasna, containing 27 villages
3. Plasa Sfântu Gheorghe, headquartered at Sfântu Gheorghe, containing 21 villages
4. Plasa Târgu Secuiesc, headquartered at Târgu Secuiesc, containing 29 villages

Later, a fifth district was added:

5. Plasa Ozun, headquartered at Ozun, containing 19 villages

Trei Scaune County contained two urban municipalities (cities): Sfântu Gheorghe (county capital) and Târgu Secuiesc (also spelt Târgu Săcuesc).

== Population ==
According to the 1930 census, the county counted 136,122 inhabitants, of which 80.4% were Hungarians, 16.0% Romanians, 2.2% Romanies, 0.6% Germans, 0.5% Jews, and other smaller minorities. From a religious point of view, the population was divided as follows: 40.6% Reformed (Calvinist), 36.1% Roman Catholic, 14.6% Eastern Orthodox, 4.6% Unitarian, 2.3% Greek Catholic, and other smaller minorities.

=== Urban population ===
The urban population was 15,925 in the 1930 census, and consisted of 78.2% Hungarians, 15.3% Romanians, 2.3% Jews, 1.6% Germans, 1.4% Romanies, and other smaller minorities. From the religious point of view, the urban population was made up of 45.0% Reformed, 31.5% Roman Catholic, 13.0% Eastern Orthodox, 3.0% Jewish, 2.9% Greek Catholic, 2.7% Unitarian, 1.7% Lutherans, and other smaller denominations.
