= Târgu Secuiesc =

Târgu Secuiesc Kézdivásárhely
- Municipality
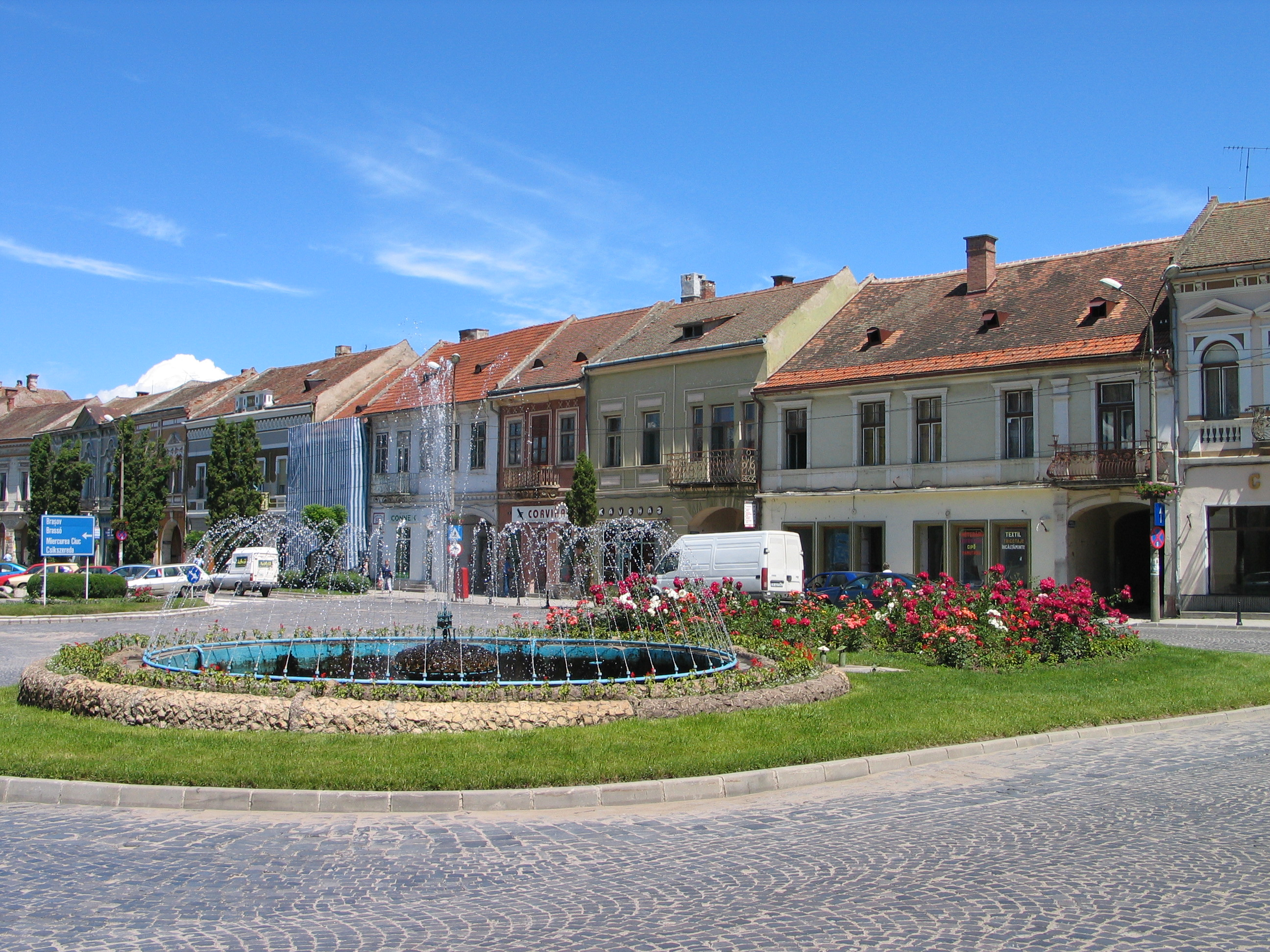
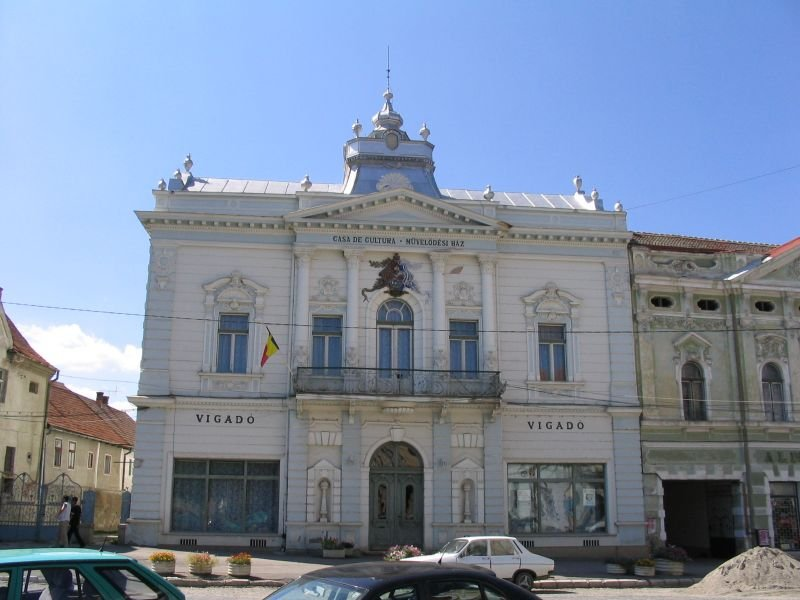
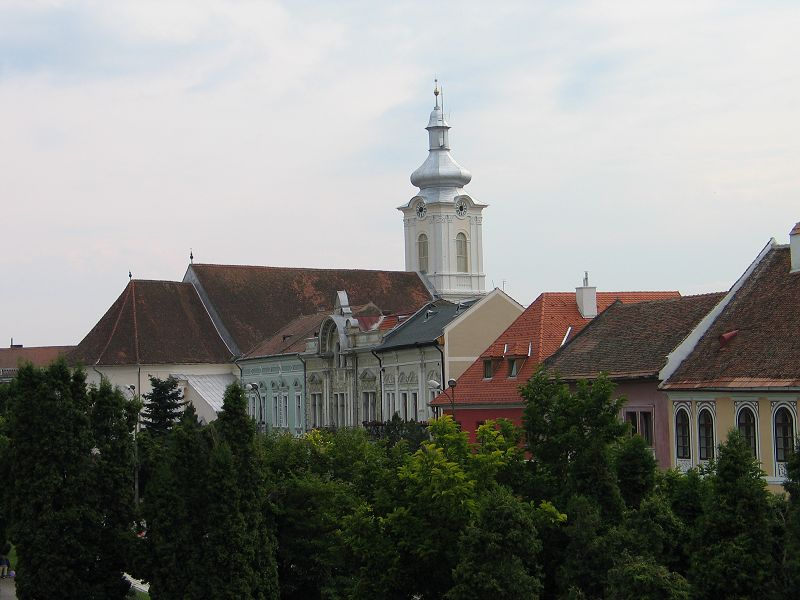
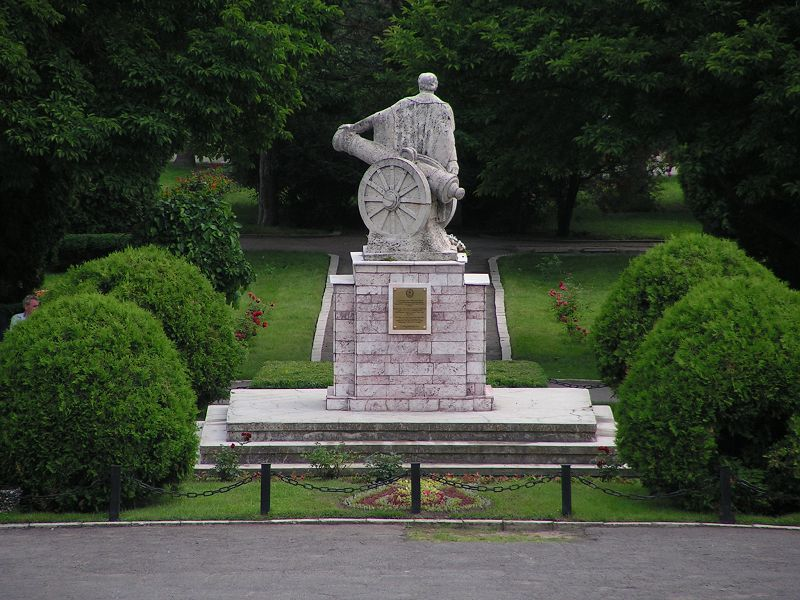
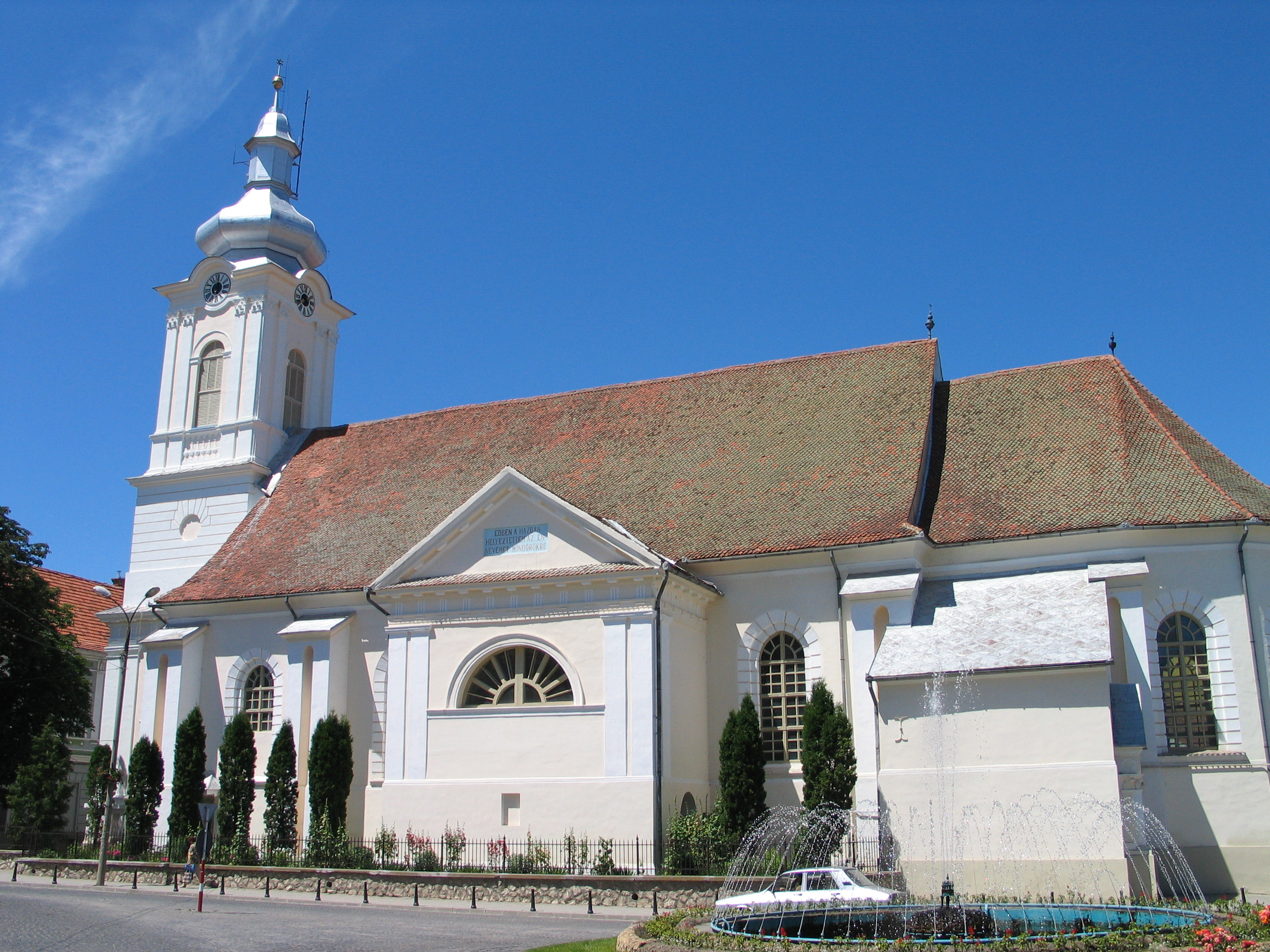
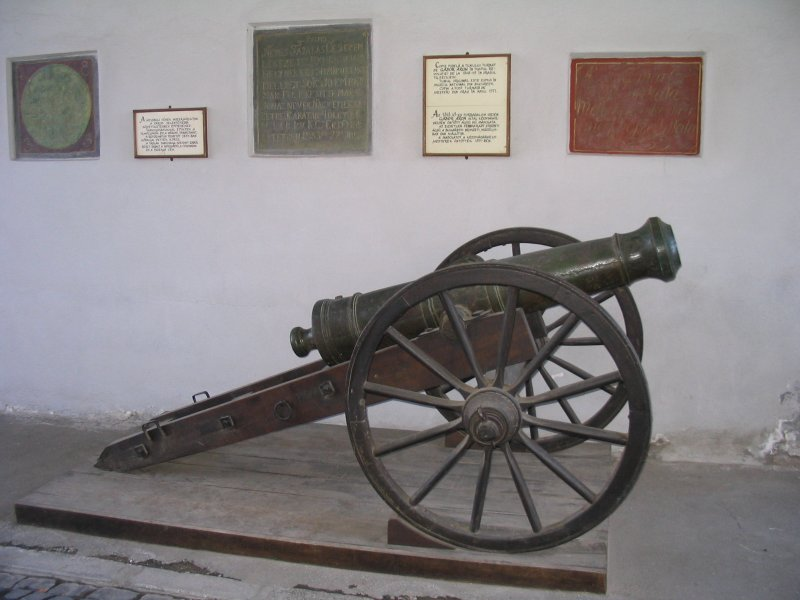
- Descending, from top: Centre of Târgu Secuiesc, Concert Hall, Houses, Statue of Áron Gábor, Reformed church, A cannon belonging to Áron Gábor

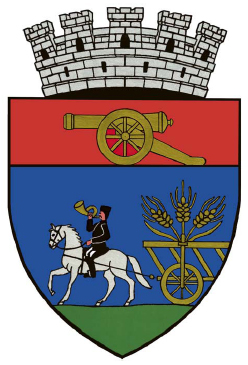
- Flag Coat of arms

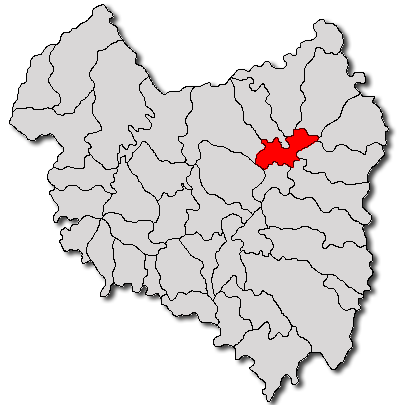
- Location in Covasna County

- Location in Romania
- Coordinates: 45°59′49″N 26°8′26″E
- Country: Romania
- County: Covasna

Government
  - Mayor (2024–2028): Tibor Bokor (UDMR)
- Area: 55.39 km^{2} (21.39 sq mi)
- Elevation: 570 m (1,870 ft)
- Population (2021-12-01): 16,243
  - Density: 293.2/km^{2} (759.5/sq mi)
- Time zone: UTC+02:00 (EET)
  - Summer (DST): UTC+03:00 (EEST)
- Postal code: 525400
- Area code: (+40) 0267
- Vehicle reg.: CV
- Website: www.kezdi.ro

Târgu Secuiesc (Romanian pronunciation: [ˌtɨrɡu sekuˈjesk]; Hungarian: Kézdivásárhely, Hungarian pronunciation: [ˈkeːzdivaːʃaːrhɛj]; German: Szekler Neumarkt) is a city in Covasna County, Transylvania, Romania. It administers one village, Lunga (Nyújtód).

== History ==
The town was first mentioned in 1407 as Torjawasara, meaning in Hungarian "Torja Market". (Torja is the name of a stream nearby and is also the Hungarian name of the nearby village Turia.) Originally, the Hungarian name Kézdivásárhely was also used in Romanian in the form Chezdi-Oșorheiu, but this was altered to Tîrgu Secuiesc (now spelled Târgu Secuiesc) after the accession to Romania in 1920 under the Treaty of Trianon. The Hungarian native name means "Kézdi Market", Kézdi being the name of a Székely "seat", a historical administrative unit. Its status as a market town dates back to the Middle Ages. The city was taken over by Hungary during World War II, following the Second Vienna Award of August, 1940. A small Jewish community was set up in the 1880s; it numbered 66 in 1920. In May 1944, the Hungarian authorities sent its members to the Sfântu Gheorghe ghetto, and deported them to the Auschwitz concentration camp the following month. Sovereignty was restored to Romania following the war.

== Demographics ==
At the 2021 census, Târgu Secuiesc had a population of 16,243; of those, 84.78% were Székely Hungarians and 6.02% Romanians. At the census from 2011, the city had 18,491 residents, of whom 91.1% were Székely Hungarians, 7.2% Romanians, and 1.6% Roma. The historical demographic evolution is as follows:

Historical population

Year	Pop.	±%
1912	6,079	—
1930	5,107	−16.0%
1948	5,424	+6.2%
1956	7,500	+38.3%

Year	Pop.	±%
1966	9,502	+26.7%
1977	16,320	+71.8%
1992	22,912	+40.4%
2002	20,488	−10.6%

Year	Pop.	±%
2011	18,491	−9.7%
2021	16,243	−12.2%

Source: Demographic change according to census data

== Natives ==
- János Balogh (chess master, 1892-1980)
- Andrei Cadar (equestrian, 1937-)
- André de Dienes (photographer, 1913-1985)
- Róbert Elek (footballer, 1988-)
- Tiberiu Ghioane (footballer, 1981-)
- Kató Havas (violinist, 1920-2018)
- Gergely Kovács (archbishop, 1968-)
- Béla Markó (politician and writer, 1951-)
- Roland Niczuly (footballer, 1995-)
- Ioan Robu (archbishop, 1944-)
- Árpád Szántó (wrestler, 1889-1984)
- Nándor Tamás (football, 2000-)
- Gábor Vajna (politician, 1891-1946)

== Education ==
Despite its relatively small size the town has a few notable high schools: Nagy Mózes, Bod Péter, Apor Péter and Gábor Áron, all bearing the names of important Székely historical personalities. Because of this, Târgu Secuiesc is considered the educational center of the north eastern part of the county.

== Geography ==
The town is located in the Brașov Depression (more precisely in the Râul Negru Depression), in the southeastern part of Transylvania, at an altitude of 560 m. It is crossed by National Road DN11, which connects Brașov to Bacău. From the town center branches off DN11B, which links the town of Târgu Secuiesc to Miercurea Ciuc. The town is crossed by the Turia River, which flows into the Negru River near the locality.

== Climate ==
The climate is temperate continental, with warm summers and cold winters. Summer temperatures rarely exceed 30 °C, while in winter temperatures frequently drop below −15 °C. The cold is intensified by air currents (the Nemira wind) blowing from the Eastern Carpathians and sweeping across the entire Brașov Depression.

Climate data for Târgu Secuiesc (altitude 568m, 2014–2026 normals, extremes 1980–present)
Month	Jan	Feb	Mar	Apr	May	Jun	Jul	Aug	Sep	Oct	Nov	Dec	Year
Record high °C (°F)	16.8 (62.2)	19.0 (66.2)	27.6 (81.7)	29.9 (85.8)	30.6 (87.1)	35.4 (95.7)	37.2 (99.0)	37.0 (98.6)	34.9 (94.8)	29.3 (84.7)	24.4 (75.9)	15.7 (60.3)	37.2 (99.0)
Mean daily maximum °C (°F)	1.6 (34.9)	5.0 (41.0)	10.2 (50.4)	15.4 (59.7)	19.7 (67.5)	24.6 (76.3)	27.0 (80.6)	27.5 (81.5)	22.2 (72.0)	15.9 (60.6)	9.5 (49.1)	3.5 (38.3)	15.2 (59.3)
Daily mean °C (°F)	−2.6 (27.3)	0.4 (32.7)	4.6 (40.3)	8.8 (47.8)	13.5 (56.3)	18.2 (64.8)	20.0 (68.0)	20.1 (68.2)	15.5 (59.9)	9.7 (49.5)	4.7 (40.5)	0.3 (32.5)	9.4 (49.0)
Mean daily minimum °C (°F)	−6.7 (19.9)	−4.3 (24.3)	−1.1 (30.0)	2.2 (36.0)	7.2 (45.0)	11.7 (53.1)	12.9 (55.2)	12.6 (54.7)	8.8 (47.8)	3.5 (38.3)	0.0 (32.0)	−2.9 (26.8)	3.7 (38.6)
Record low °C (°F)	−30.5 (−22.9)	−26.4 (−15.5)	−21.6 (−6.9)	−15.6 (3.9)	−8.0 (17.6)	0.8 (33.4)	3.4 (38.1)	3.0 (37.4)	−3.8 (25.2)	−10.0 (14.0)	−21.9 (−7.4)	−32.0 (−25.6)	−32.0 (−25.6)
Average precipitation mm (inches)	15.9 (0.63)	15.8 (0.62)	29.9 (1.18)	40.4 (1.59)	75.9 (2.99)	121.5 (4.78)	79.7 (3.14)	70.2 (2.76)	43.3 (1.70)	30.7 (1.21)	23.3 (0.92)	19.2 (0.76)	565.8 (22.28)
Average precipitation days (≥ 1.0 mm)	3.6	4.0	5.5	6.2	10.2	12.2	8.7	6.2	5.1	5.1	4.9	4.8	76.5
Source: Meteomanz (2014-2026); Infoclimat (1980-2010)

== Gallery ==
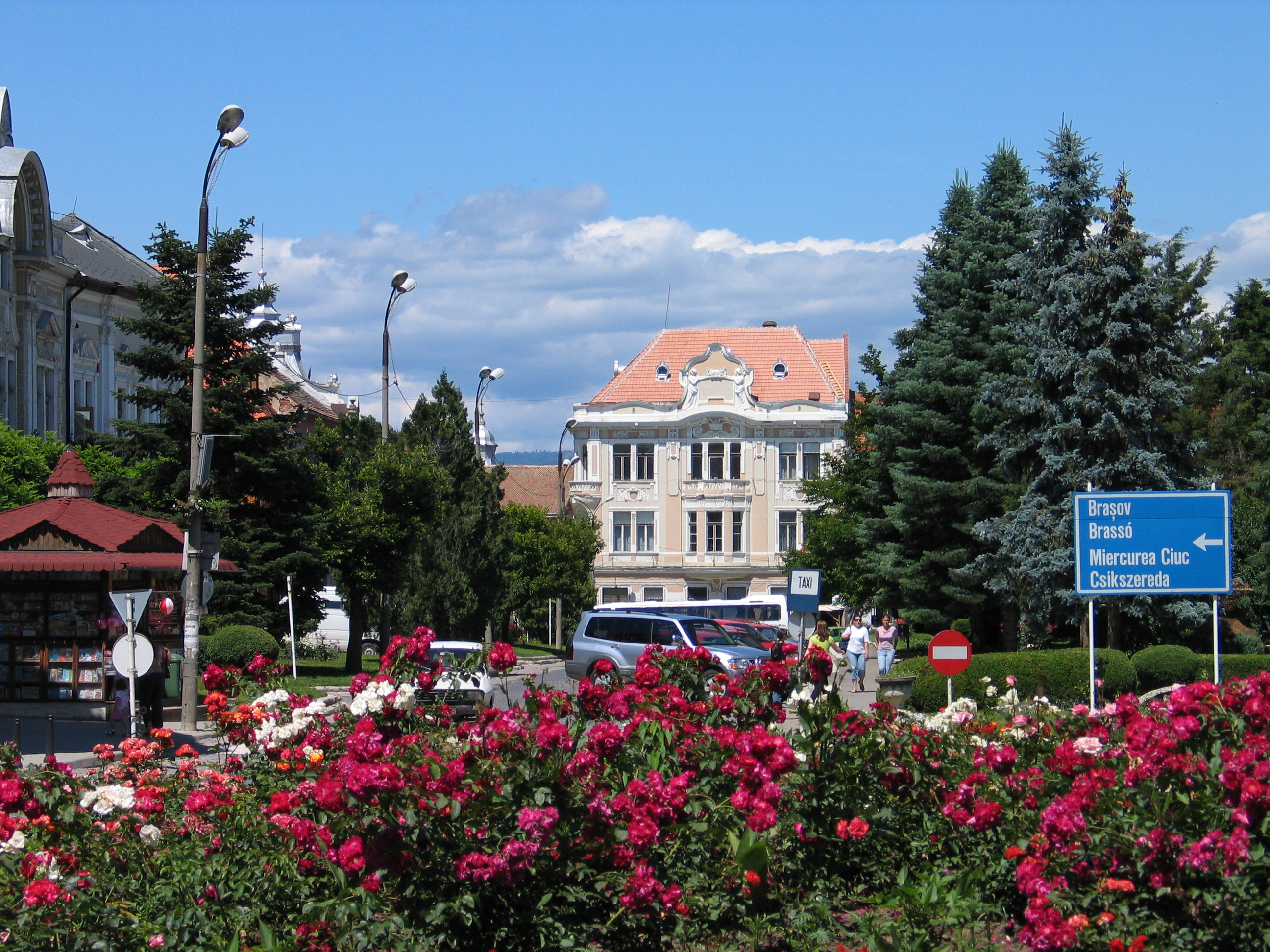
City center

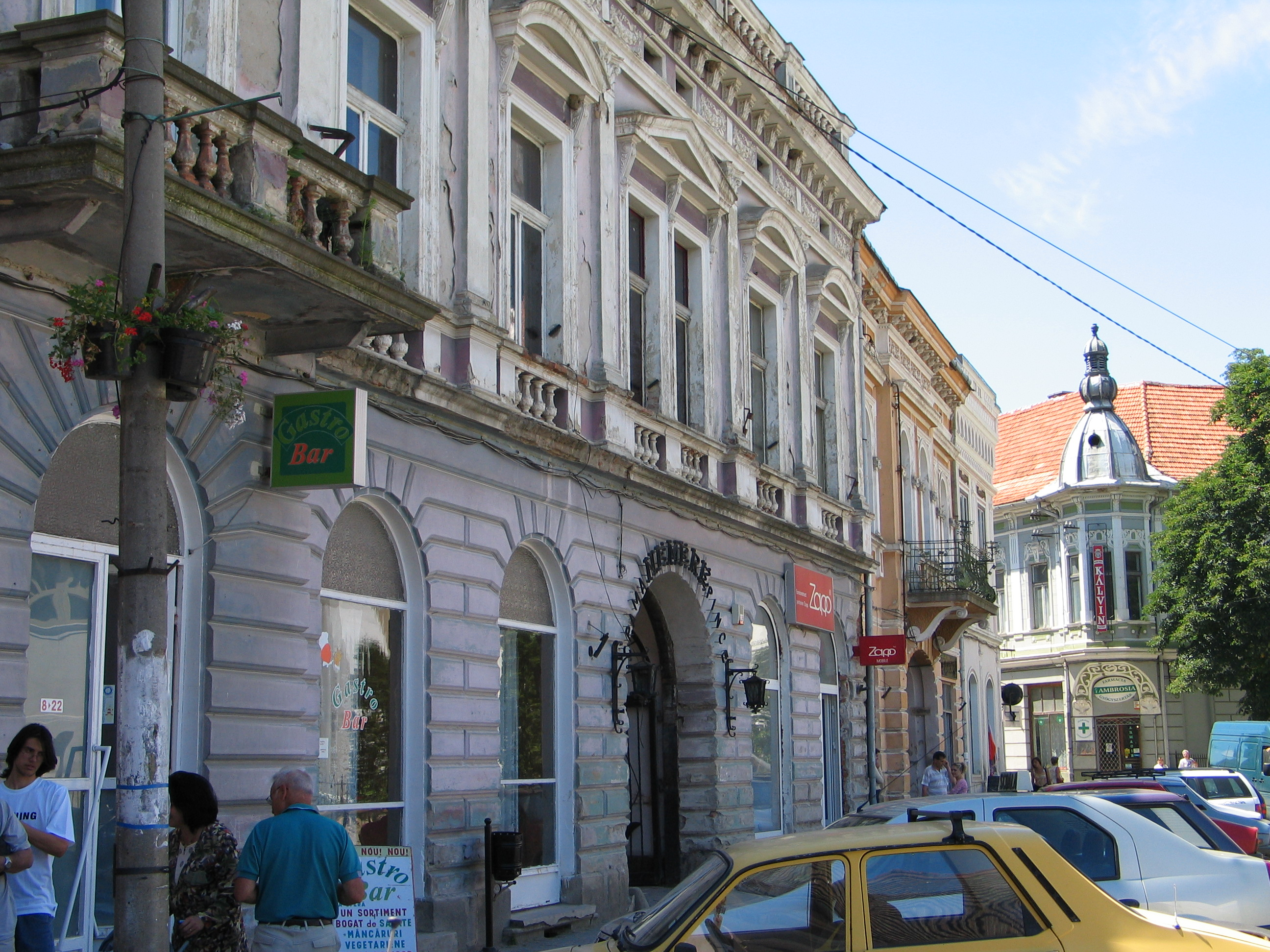
City center

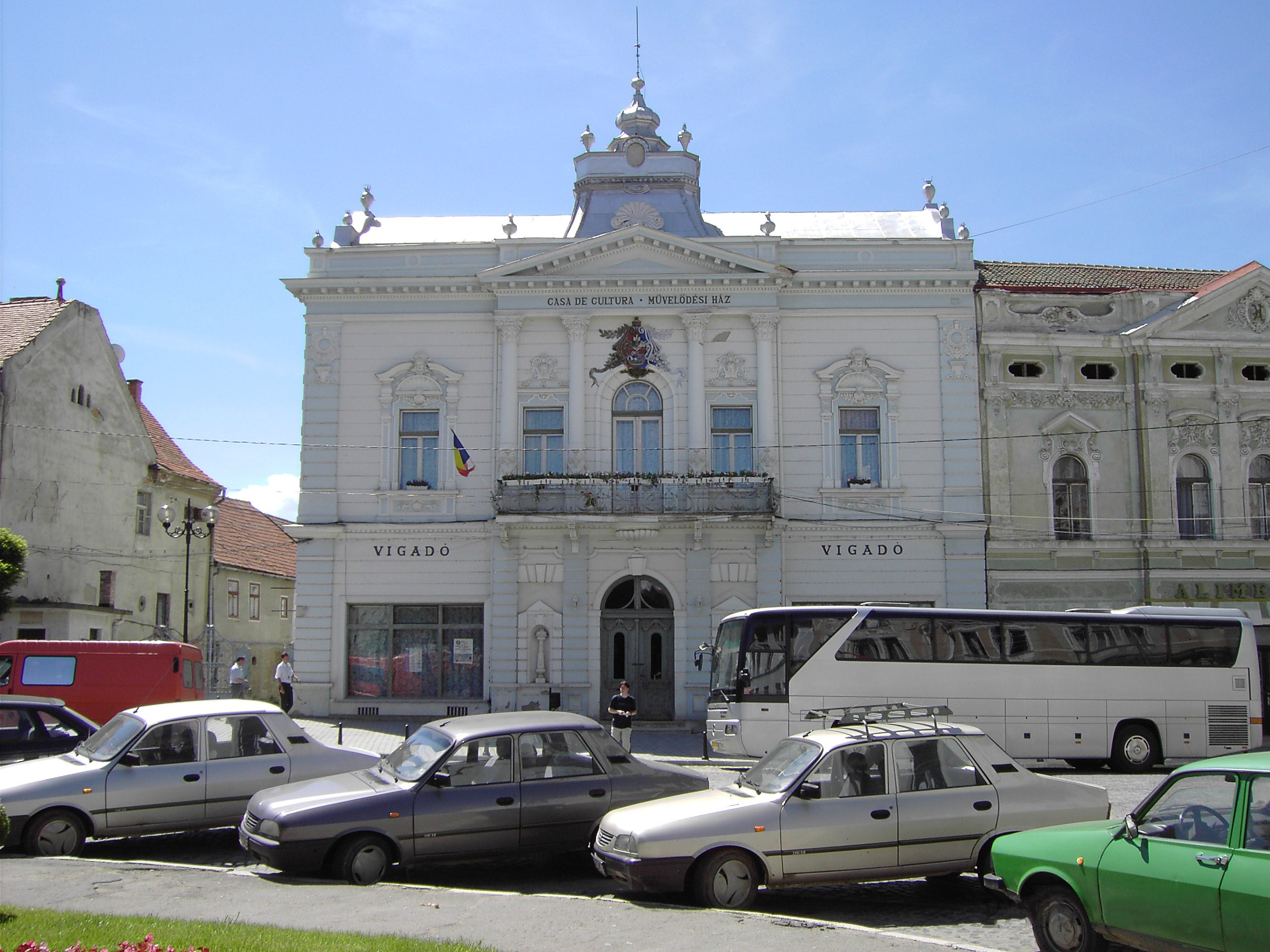
Cultural Center

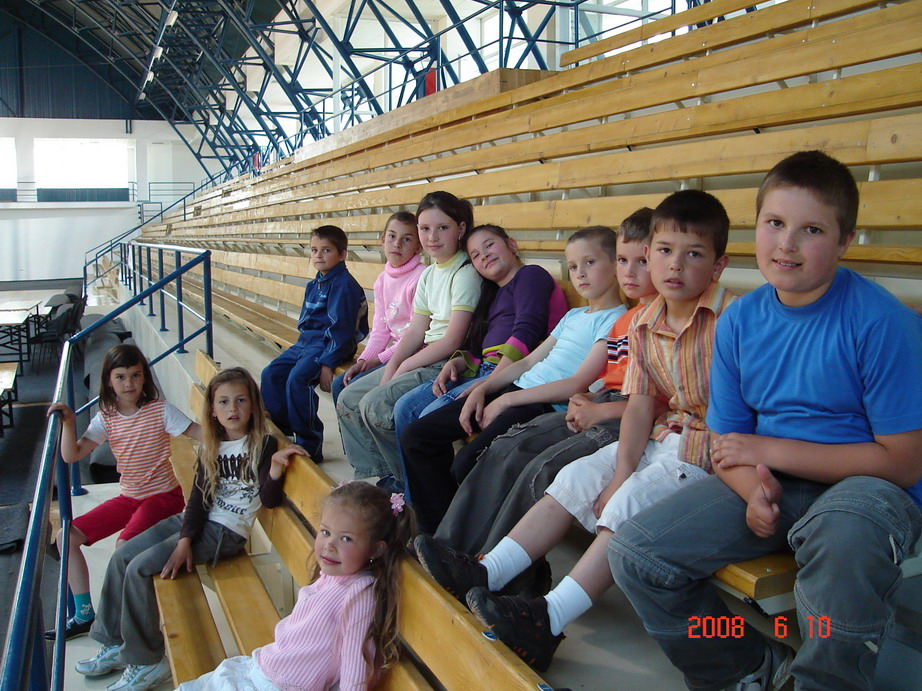
Children inside Sala Polivalenta Sporting Hall

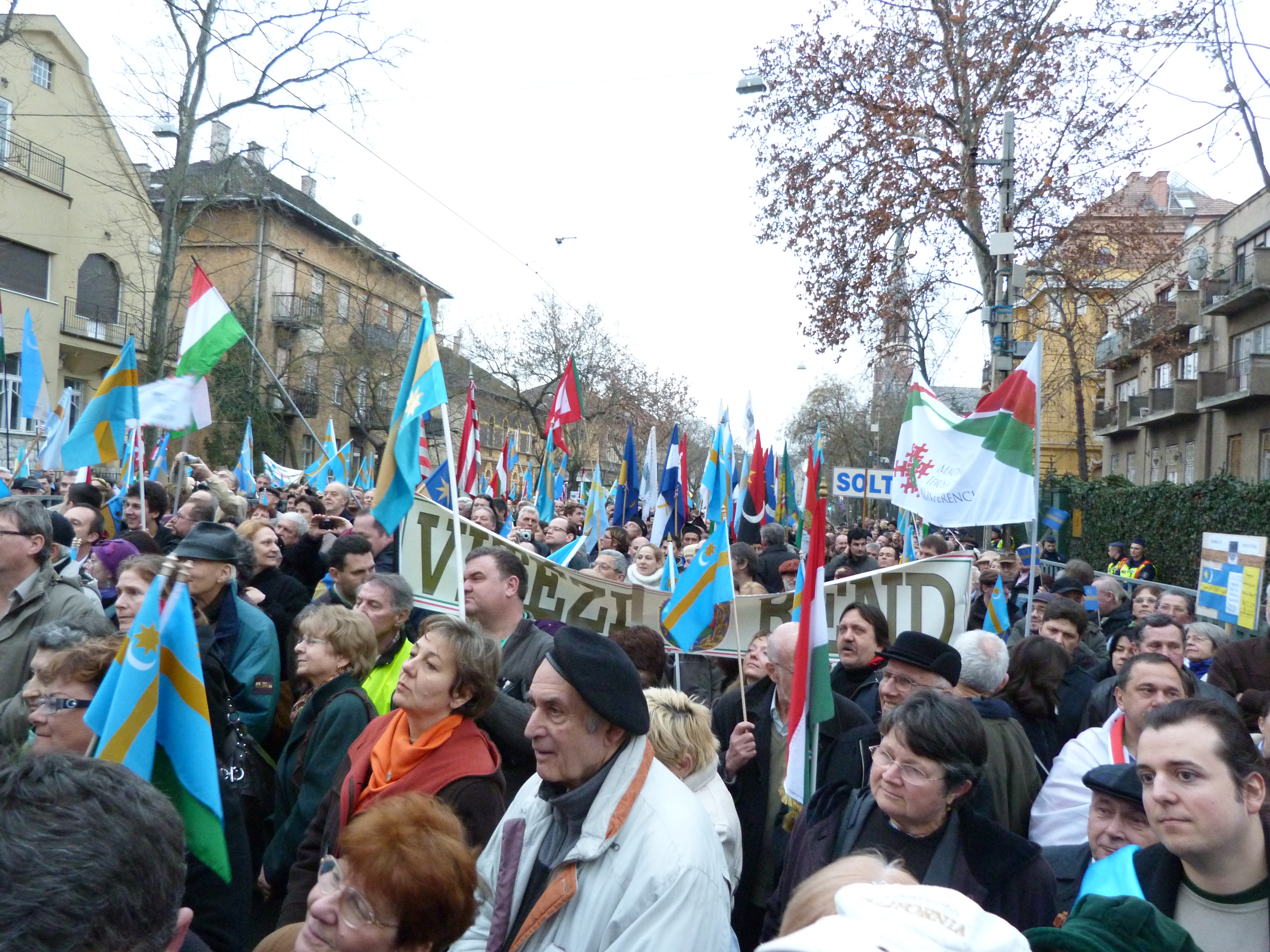
Székely Freedom Day celebration
