= Battle of Rika =

Battle in the Hungarian Revolution of 1848

Coordinates: 46°05′43.5″N 25°31′42.5″E

- Part of the Hungarian Revolution of 1848
Date	13 December 1848
Location	Felsőrákos, Vargyas the valley of the Rika stream Háromszék County, Kingdom of Hungary
Result	Székely-Hungarian victory.

Belligerents
Székelys from Háromszék Seat	Austrian Empire: Transylvanian Romanians; Transylvanian Saxons

Commanders and leaders
Sándor Gál; Ignác Horváth; Áron Gábor	August von Heydte

Strength
Total: 1,480; 270 riflemen 900 spearmen 310 hussars 2 cannons (the 310 hussars and the 2 cannons participated effectively in the battle )	2,600+ ? men 2 doppelhakens

Casualties and losses
A couple of wounded Hussars	Total: 297 killed 600 cattle 300 kg gunpowder Heydte's official correspondence

The Battle of Rika or Battle of Felsőrákos-Rika-Vargyas was a battle in the Hungarian Revolution of 1848, fought on 13 December 1848 at Felsőrákos, Vargyas the valley of the Rika stream Háromszék County in southeastern Transylvania. The Székelys from Háromszék, sustaining the Hungarian revolution, led by Captain Sándor Gál, Captain Ignác Horváth Kovachich and Áron Gábor defeated the troops of the Habsburg Empire Captain August von Heydte reinforced by Transylvanian Romanian and Saxon militias and national guards. This victory forced the Austrian commander with the mission to crush the resistance of the Székelys of Háromszék, Lieutenant General Joseph Gedeon, was forced to ask reinforcements from the Austrian commandement of Transylvania, which weakened in a decisive way the Austrian troops right before the start of their fight with the Army of Transylvania led by General Józef Bem.

== Background ==
Starting from 30 November 1848 the Székely forces of the Háromszék Seat won several victories against the joint Austrian, Romanian and Saxon troops led by General Joseph von Gedeon. After initial victories the Székelys suffered a defeat at Marosvásárhely on November 5. The army disintegrated with the soldiers leaving for home. One by one the Transylvanian districts surrendered to the Emperor's Transylvanian commander-in-chief. There were, however, two features which proved to be important later. First, the Székely districts took the oath to the new Emperor on the condition that the imperial army would not occupy their territory and that they would not have to lay down their arms. Second, Háromszék, one of the districts, refused to surrender and declared a defensive war.

Starting with 12 November 1848, the people of the Seat, decided to refuse to obey Puchner's orders of submission, organize a military resistance, creating even cannons, and founding a small artillery, thanks to the ingenious Székely engineer Áron Gábor. After a general mobilization, they waited for the attack of the Austrian troops. On 30 November, in the First Battle of Hídvég, the Székelys defeated the attacking Austrian troops, and on 5 December entered in a counterattack, occupying several villages from the Barcaság region, defeating in smaller battles the Austrian regular troops, reinforced by Romanian and Saxon insurgent militias from there. After these successes the Székelys even decided to attack the city of Brassó, one of the most important towns in Transylvania, and one of the headquarters of the Habsburg forces. General of the cavalry Anton Puchner, the commander of the Habsburg forces in Transylvania, who, starting with October, had almost completely occupied Transylvania from the Hungarian troops, and was planning to advance towards Nagyvárad, attacking from the east the Hungarian revolutionary government, threatened from the west by the Habsburg offensive led by Field Marshal Alfred I, Prince of Windisch-Grätz, and from the north by the Austrian corps led by Gemneral Franz Schlik, was forced by the Székely victories to engage a third of his forces against Háromszék, thus to postpone his offensive to the West, thanks to which the Hungarian resistance from Eastern Hungary was spared from a very dangerous attack from the rear, which could seal its fate already in December 1848. Until the reinforcements sent by Puchner towards Háromszék arrived, any major attacks from the Austrian local forces were halted.

== Prelude ==
But a force of around 2,600 soldiers, Saxon and Romanian militas (Note: According to some sources Heydte had between 5,000 and 8,000 soldiers) entered in the hilly and mountainous forested region called Erdővidék (Forest Region), situated in northwestern Háromszék, and started to gather the weapons from the Székelys leaving there.

A Székely troop, divided into two parts, marched against Heydte, on the two banks of the Olt river, towards Erdővidék. Colonel Károly Dobai advanced on the left side of the Olt towards Ürmös. Captains György Klement and Alajos Butzi marched on the right bank, through Nagyajta and Köpec. Encouraged by the initial successes, the approximately 250 Royal Hungarian Honvéds of the XIIth Battalion, 30 Hussars and a few hundred National Guards (others say that 500 spearmen from Erdővidék, 170 of Honvéds with bayonets and 37 Hussars and two cannons participated) did not wait for the larger troop of Colonel Károly Dobai, and attacked the army of Captain August von Heydte. The main battle took place on 9 December at the bridge at Köpec. It ended with a victory for Heydte. Sources differ on the number of casualties. The victorious enemy lost 19 or 27, or 36 soldiers. According to Heydte, the Székelys lost 20, according to the priest from Nagyborosnyó Áron Benedek 5, and according to Captain Ignác Horváth 7 casualties. The victors occupied the village of Köpec. They proclaimed that no one in the village would be harmed. The weapons were confiscated. In the evening, the Austrian Dragoons set fire to the village, and then, with the Romanians and Saxons from their camp, began to murder the unarmed population. In the massacre 51 civilians were killed, including a retired imperial captain who had been living there.

After the victory in Köpec, Gedeon could look to the future with hope, as he received reports of the retreat of the Székely forces from several places. This allowed the imperial forces to re-occupy the villages of the Felső-Fehér County which lay around Háromszék. On 10 December, Colonel Johann Stutterheim reported that he had sent a detachment forward to Földvár to establish contact with Heydte and coordinate their activities. At the same time, an attack was being prepared to be launched with the brigade on its way to Háromszék sent by Puchner, and placed Romanian and Saxon popular insurgents and militiamen in Szunyogszék and Höltövény.

At dusk, Captain Sándor Gál arrived in Nagyajta with his troops. Colonel Dobai also sent as reinforcements one and a half companies of armed Székelys, together with a troop of spearmen and two cannons under the command of Áron Gábor. As in his other battles, Áron Gábor was accompanied by his wife Justina Velcsuj, even though she was pregnant.

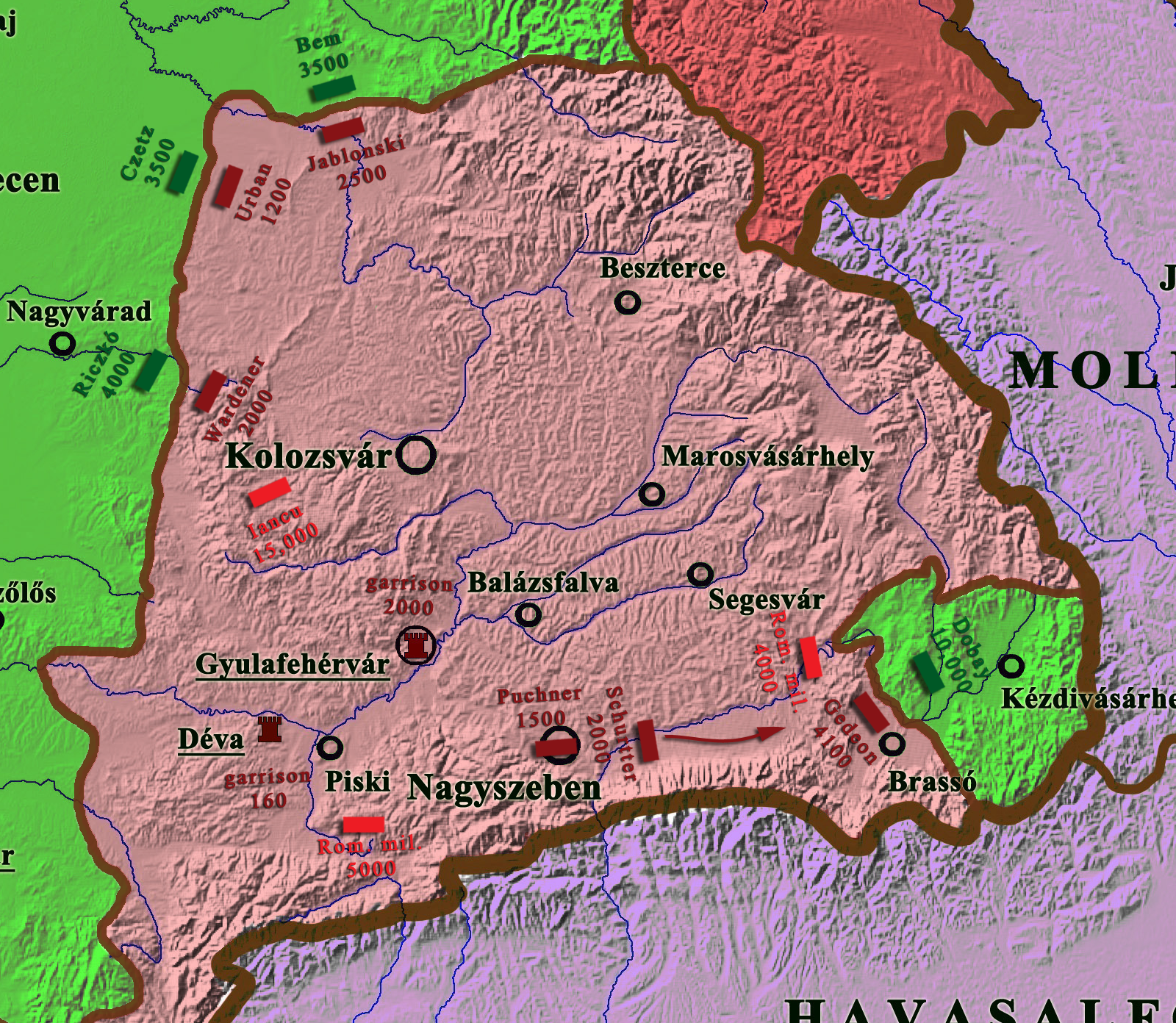
The military situation in Transylvania in November 1848. Red - territories occupied by the Austrians. Green - territories in the hands of the Hungarians

On the same day Heydte sent a letter to the troops from Nagyajta. Referring to the burning of Köpec, and the massacre of its inhabitants, he called on the people of Háromszék to surrender unconditionally, threatening them that the whole seat might fall to the fate of the village. On the same day, Heydte's letter was sent to Sepsiszentgyörgy, the seat of Háromszék. But instead of a letter of surrender, captain Ignác Horváth Kovachich, or Captain Sándor Gál, responded to Heydte, threatening the imperials with imminent revenge. The destruction of Köpec caused great indignation among the Székelys. If Heydte's aim was intimidation, it had the opposite effect.

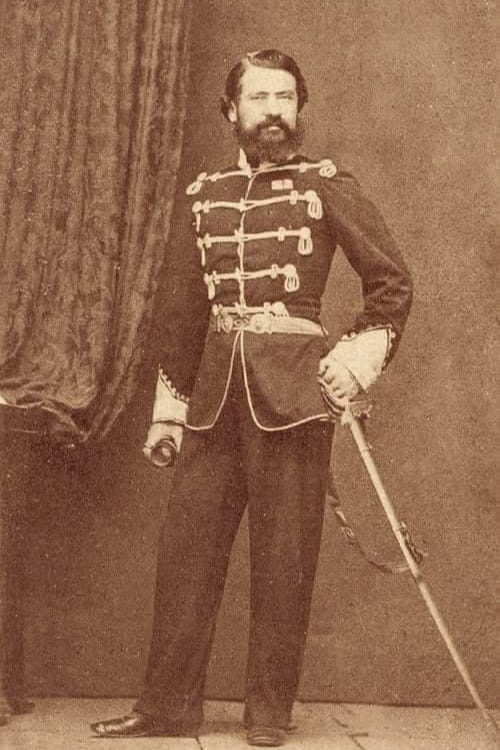
Sándor Gál

On the day after the battle of Köpec, Székely Hussars appeared at the smoking ruins of the village. Captain Kovachich Horváth with his hundred and thirty men marched from Hídvég to Nagyajta, and from there he sent patrols as far as the Barót stream. They found that the imperials had set up camp on the side of Felsőrákos close to Olasztelek and controlled the area as far as Barót. In the evening Captain Gál arrived, who agreed with Horváth that they should attack as soon as possible. For this Colonel Dobay provided them with a sufficient force. According to the plan, the Székely forces were divided into two groups. One of them, led by Horváth, had to move from Nagyajta to Középajta, then through Szárazajta to Nagybacon, and from there to Bibarcfalva and through Barót to Olasztelek. The other grouping, led by Gál, had to march through Köpec straight to Felsőrákos and to start the attack against Heydte's troops. The bidirectional attack was intended to make it impossible for Heydte to retreat. The battle plan was for Captain Horváth to march unnoticed across the bridges of the Rika stream valley, wait for Sándor Gál's troops to attack the enemy from the front, and at the decisive moment to attack the enemy's flank.

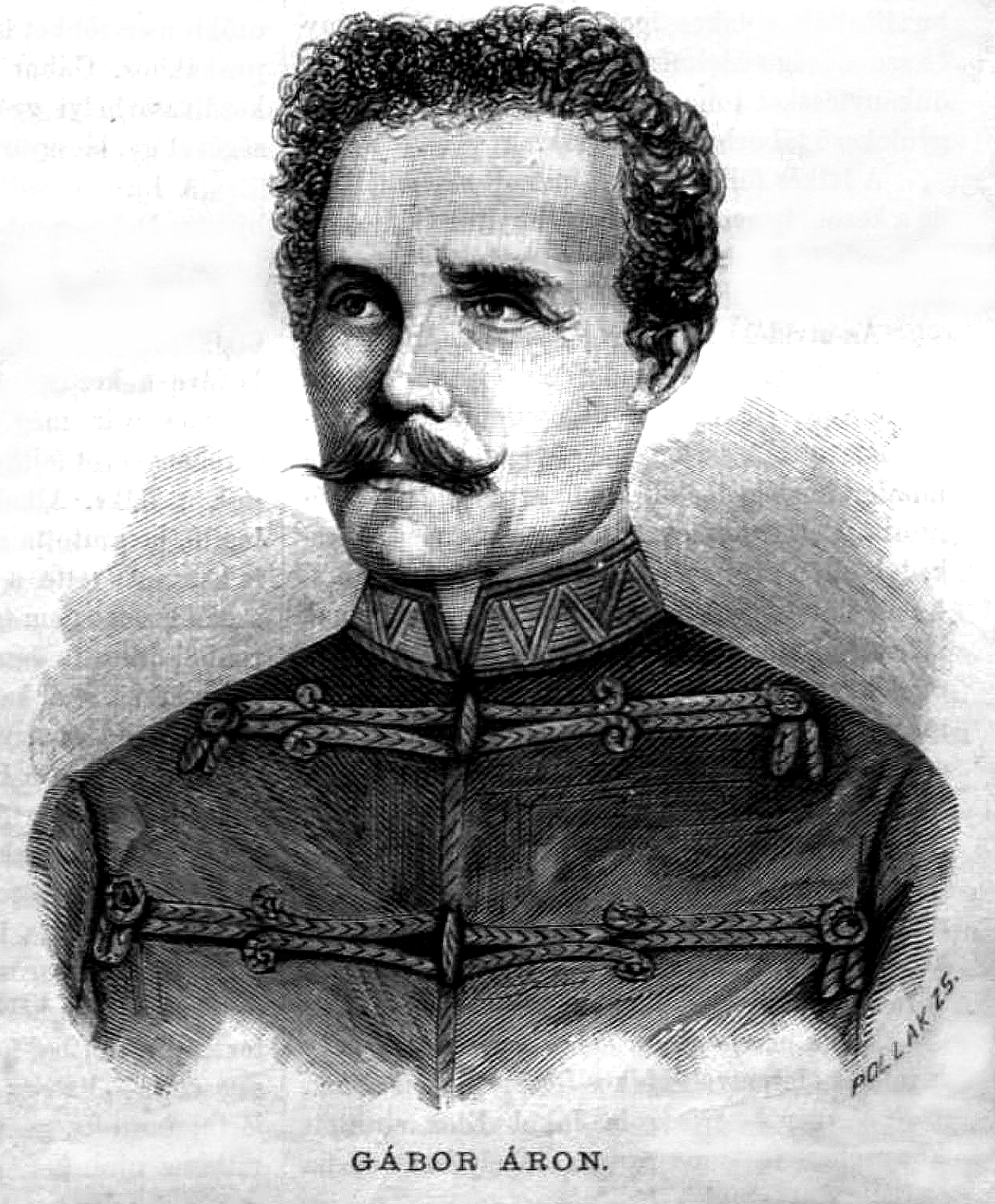
Gábor Áron

Horváth's detachment comprised 130 hussars led by himself, and Captain Butyka's 150 riflemen, and 500 spearmen from Erdővidék. Gál's troops consisted of 180 Hussars under the command of Lieutenant Máday, 120 riflemen, and 400 spearmen, as well as two six-pounder cannons under the command of Áron Gábor. These numbers were recorded by Horváth, but, according to historian Tamás Csikány, their number could have been higher, because probably also troops of ill armed Székely militias could have joined them.

Horváth's detachment set off on the designated route on 12 December, and by the evening they had to reach Nagybacon. The next day they wanted to arrive early at Barót to surprise the Dragoons they had expected to find there. However, this failed, because the imperial outpost received news of the Székely movements, so he retreated to his camp. The early arrival did not succeed either, because the infantrymen arrived at the place determined by Horváth only after a considerable delay, at 8 o'clock in the morning of 13 December. After it became clear that Heydte had been informed of the Székely presence, Horváth decided not to march as far as Olasztelek, but to attack from the hill north of Barót, where he had deployed the infantry. Horváth observed the enemy from the chapel on the hill, whose camp he saw in front of the edge of Felsőrákos, leaning towards Alsórákos, guarded by 68 dragoons posted on two sides around the Rákos stream. On the hill, Major Butyka lined up his infantry, with Count Imre Kálnoky standing 200 paces behind him with his spearmen. In the morning, Gál's detachment also arrived, after leaving Köpec crossed the Barót stream, and then took up the battle order. He brought there the two six-pounder guns of Áron Gábor, obviously covered by cavalry, while the riflemen must be used by Gál, who was a highly trained officer, in a standard skirmish line. The commander also placed horsemen behind the infantry to close the ranks and reinforce the infantry. In reality, the detachment of Gál did not intervene in the battle, only the fire of the guns contributed to the success that was to come.

== Battle ==
Heydte observed the deployment of the Székelys with proper attention. The army marching against him the number of which he described as 8–9000, accompanied by four cannons, at least that is how he recorded it in his report. After this, although the previous day he had received a platoon of Dragoons as reinforcement, he decided not to engage the enemy, to repulse their attack, then retreat to the Homoród area across the Rika Mountain. Accordingly, he deployed his troops north of Felsőrákos, along the road to Székelyudvarhely. In accordance with his decision, he deployed his troop to march. The column was led by the 1st Company of the Savoy Dragoons, followed by two Romanian border guard companies, a platoon of the Sivkovich infantry, two double hook guns (Doppelhaken), and the militias led by Lieutenant Thomassegovich and Lieutenant Caballini. The column was covered from the rear by the 4th company of the Bianchi infantry regiment. The rest of the Romanian and Saxon militias and a platoon of the Savoy Dragoons, led by Lieutenant Gustav Bundschuh, secured the march from the left so that if the Székelys attacked from the direction of Barót, they had to fight them to protect the main column.

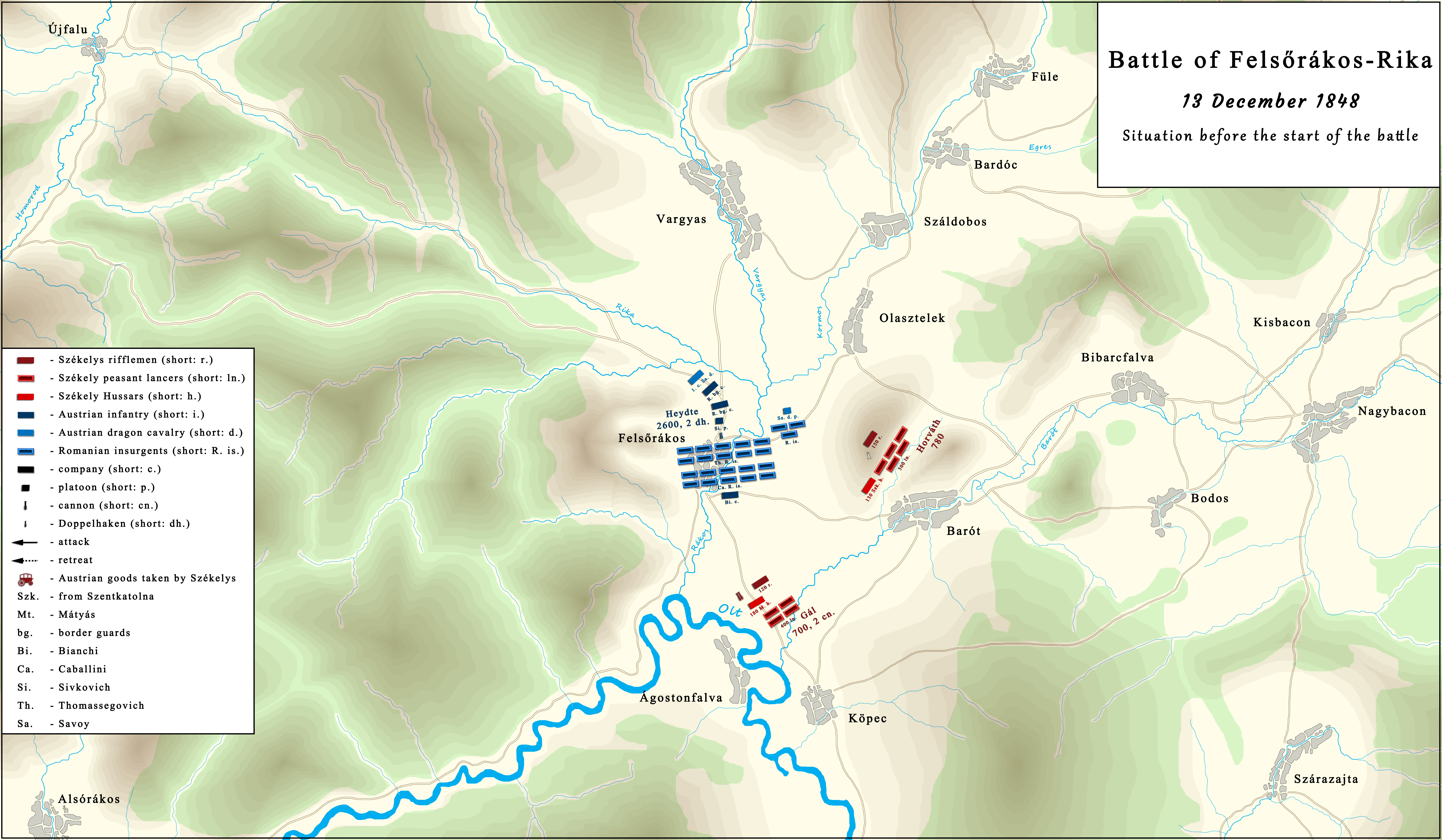
Battle of Rika of 13 December 1848. The situation before the battle

The imperial movements did not escape the attention of Captain Ignác Horváth, although he wrongly taught from the retreat of part of the enemy to the left that they might be trying to occupy Olasztelek. He wanted to prevent this at all costs, so he urgently ordered eight hussars, thirty riflemen, and a company of militias to rush to the village. At the same time, Áron Gábor's guns started to shoot.

Horváth next found that the troops facing him at the Kormos-Lángos stream stopped and deployed for the fight. He then launched his remaining force, which spread before the stream, but by the time the attack was launched the enemy had retreated. Horváth ordered the Székelys to pursue the enemy, but this almost got stuck when they reached the stream. In the meantime, Horváth's cavalry galloped down the stream towards Olasztelek in search of a ford. The infantry didn't think it was a good idea to wade through the knee-deep icy water during the winter, but Horváth eventually forced them to cross. One of the dissatisfied infantrymen then fired at Captain Horváth from behind, and the bullet whizzed past his ear, whereupon he rode to him and cut the soldier down with his sword. After the crossing, they were confronted by a platoon of Dragoons (half a company), who, surprisingly, did not attack the infantry, but to the Székelys surprise, began to retreat, despite the fact that Horváth, in an attempt to make them fight his troops, shouted insults at them, calling them disgraces of the imperial army. In the meantime, Gál was approaching the village without any resistance. However, significant events continued to take place only on the right flank.

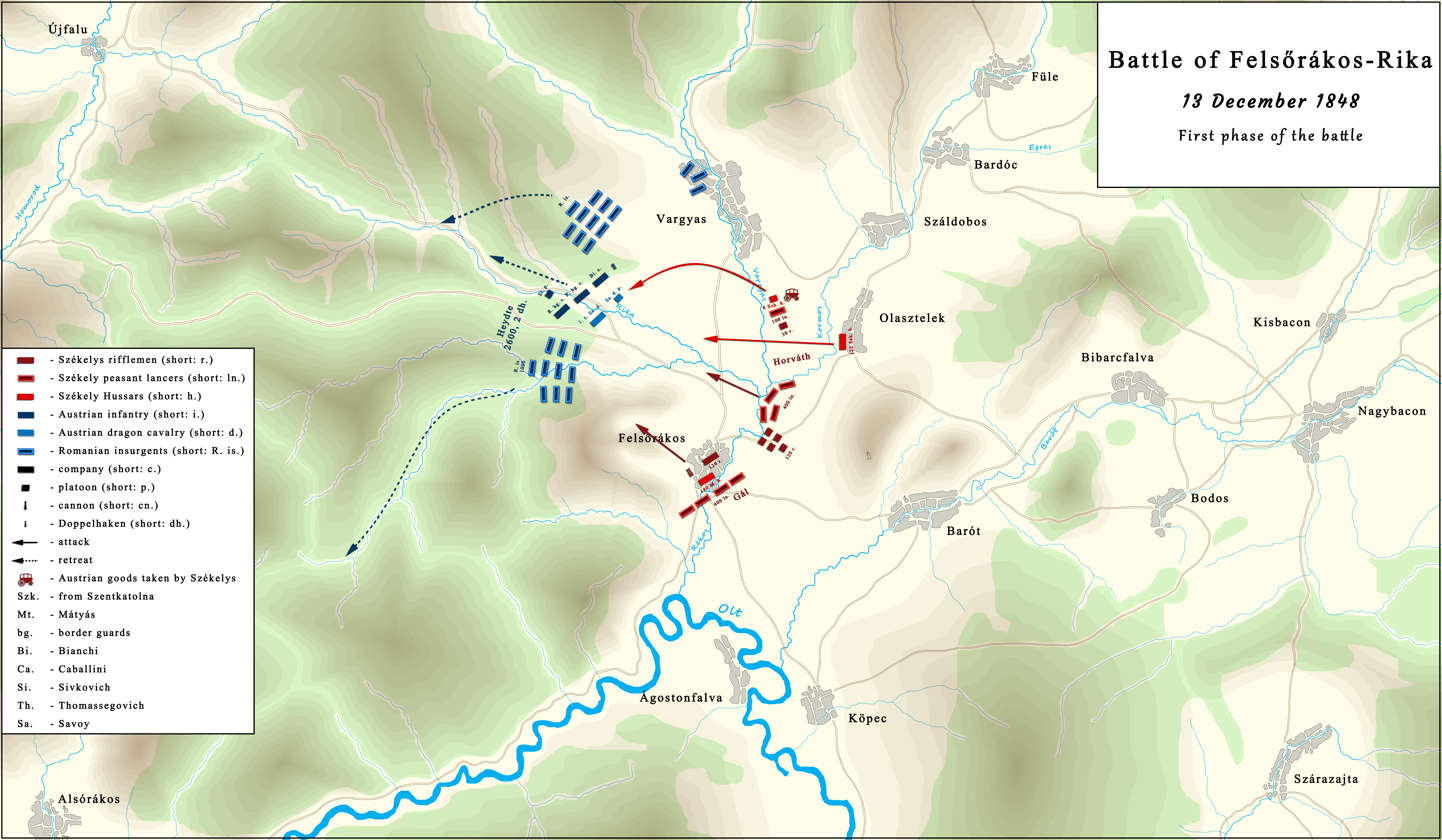
Battle of Rika of 13 December 1848. First phase of the battle

During the advance of the infantry, Hussars captured a gunpowder wagon that was rushing to Vargyas. After they had finished this action, some of the Szekler hussars - from the 9th Szentkatolna Company - attacked the enemy which was regrouping. They were aided in this by the troops and artillery of Sándor Gál, who invaded the village. Seeing this, the enemy was terrified, broke into two groups, and retreated. One part fled towards Alsórákos. The other half of the imperial infantry retreated along the highway, in the valley of the Rika stream, to the edge of the forest and there tried to form a defensive position on a height. They were supported in this by the Dragoons, who had developed into a skirmish line in front of them. 9 of the Székely hussars from Szentkatolna attacked them in a skirmish line. The two guns led by Áron Gábor started firing at a large crowd of Romanian pikes carrying militiamen gathered on a hill south of the Rika River, causing them to rout. It is worthy to note that the account of the former artillerist Major Sándor Demeter, who described this stage of the battle in an article in the newspaper Vasárnapi Újság in quite a romanticised, literary manner, like it was a real armed clash between the two sides, is contested by his fellow artilleryman Major Zsigmond László, as well as Lieutenant Colonel Ignác Kovachich Horváth, who was leading the right wing of the Székely troops, both saying that Heydte's army started to flee immediately after the hussars attacked and the two guns of Áron Gábor started to fire. The horsemen of the two sides fired at each other with their pistols and carbines, while Horváth, with his own company of Mátyás Hussars, tried to support the Székely Hussars. After a short fight, the dragoons began to retreat, but further back, at a swampy ditch, they stood up again and tried to hold their ground. They were followed by the 9 hussars from Szentkatolna, who crossed the bridge over the Rika. Soon after, however, word came to Horváth, that the 9 hussars were under attack by the enemy and they are in danger. Later, Captain Horváth wrote that the 9 hussars, surrounded by a platoon of dragoons, confronted them, killing two and wounding several. But it was feared that they would not be able to hold against this overwhelming force for long. Horváth, however, was afraid to let the Mátyás hussars into the forest, for he feared that the enemy had set a trap for his hussars. He knew that in a steep river valley surrounded by wooded hills, the Hussars were very vulnerable. He wanted to send the infantry after them, but they were reluctant to advance, saying that beyond the Rika was the territory of Udvarhely Seat, if they crossed the bridge they would attack across the border of their administrative unit, but their mission was only to defend their homeland, and not attack another region. Horváth scolded them, threatening them with court martial.

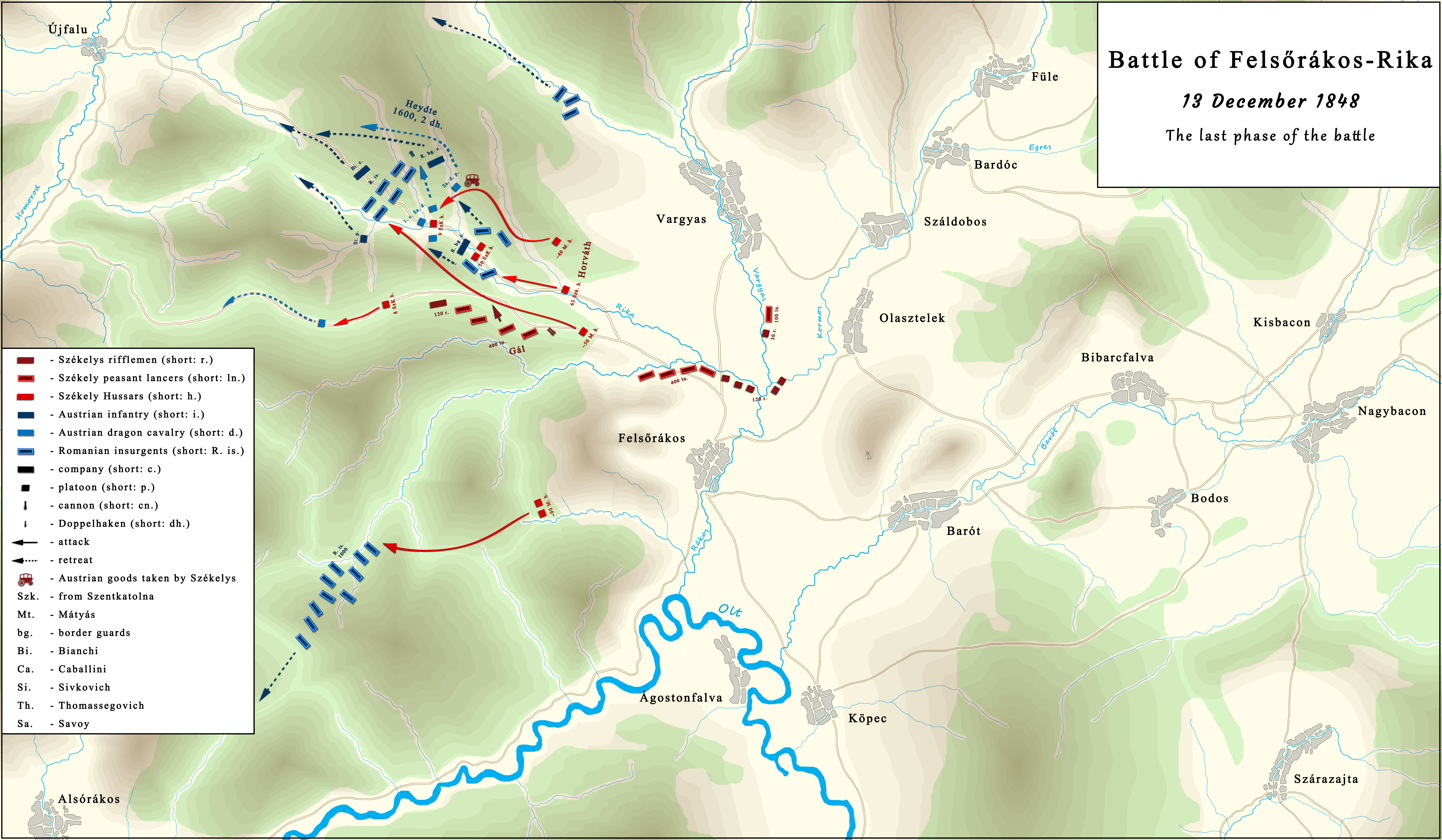
Battle of Rika of 13 December 1848. The last phase of the battle

Meanwhile, he saw a herd of cattle being driven by enemy horsemen in another valley. He sent 8 hussars to capture the cattle, and half a company of hussars from Szentkatolna to the aid of the aforementioned 9 hussars from the same village, but soon after, news came that these were also surrounded by the enemy infantry. This confirmed his suspicion that the Austrians had set a trap for his hussars. To save them, he sent half a company of hussars after them under Lieutenant Pronvic, followed by another platoon of hussars led by himself. Fortunately, when they approached the trapped hussars, they saw that they could not be defeated by the enemy dragoons, only two of them being wounded on their heads, and when the dragoons saw the rescuers approaching, they panicked and fled. By this time, Captain Gál had already arrived with the guns, but Horváth advised him not to use them in the battle in the forest. Half a company of hussars under Lieutenants Pronvic and Török also captured a gunpowder wagon after the Dragoons defending it had been driven off. The initially orderly retreat of the imperials eventually degenerated into a disorderly flight. The Székely Hussars pursued the fleeing infantrymen and militiamen, slaughtering and wounding many, avenging in this way the massacre of Köpec. With that, around 3 pm, the battle was over and Heydte's army was destroyed.

== Aftermath ==
According to Horváth's memoirs, 200 people were buried by the enemy, and a few prisoners were taken, while from the Székelys only soldiers were wounded. According to other sources, from the army of Heydte, 297 men were killed. The Hussars lost no men, but thirty-six swords were broken in the fight, and they captured sixty cattle and three hundred kg of gunpowder. The only way the Romanian border guards managed to save the other ammunition wagons was by driving them off the road at the beginning of the battle, covering the wagons' tracks with leaves, and crossing the wooded mountains to Homoród. In the priest's house from Felsőrákos, the Székelys also found the official correspondence of Heydte, who had forgotten it in his haste. Among the letters, Heydte requests reinforcements and cavalry from Gedeon and Puchner. From it, the leaders of the Székely army also learned that from the 29,000 imperial troops fighting in Transylvania 6,000-7,000 were fighting against the Székelys from the Háromszék Seat. Captain Horváth concluded from this information, that the Hungarian armies pushed back to the border of Transylvania by the imperial troops, must be started a successful counter-attack. On the same day, in revenge, the people of Köpec set fire to Ágostonfalva, from where many Romanian militias participated in the massacre and plunder of their village.

On the evening of 13 December Heydte sent a letter to Gedeon from Homoród, where he disorderly retreated with the remnants of his army, in which he exaggeratedly wrote about the attack of the entire Szekler army. He reported to his superior that he would try next to gather his troops and cover Kőhalom from a possible attack. The next day he moved his headquarters to Székelyzsombor.

The captain tried to explain the causes of the failure. I feel the lack of artillery and cavalry very much, he wrote from Homoród on the evening of 13 December. Heydte made this clear in his letter of 16 December: Sir, please allow me to request urgently that two light field guns be sent here, as without them it is difficult to convince the Romanians to advance. He repeatedly mentioned the indiscipline and unreliability of the Romanian militias.

After the battle, between 14 and 19 May, Erdővidék, the Csángó villages from Barcaság, and most of the villages in Upper Fehér County were under the control of Háromszék. Their defensive line was centered at Aldoboly, their right flank at Rákos and their left flank at Hétfalu. Sándor Gál and his army took up defensive positions in the area of Barót, Olasztelek and Miklósvár, while his outposts were camped near Rákos.

Háromszék tried to settle its relations with the Romanian and Saxon villages of Barcaság. Hétfalu, Barcaszentpéter, Botfalu, Földvár, Höltövény, Szászmagyarós, Apáca, and Prázsmár declared that they recognize the Hungarian responsible government and maintain good neighborly relations. In addition, the leaders of Háromszék declared that the Hungarian Revolution did not intend to oppress nationalities, on the contrary, they wanted to share the freedom they had won with "all peoples" whether Romanian or Saxon.

The situation changed decisively on 18 December with the arrival of the Schurtter Brigade in Brassó. In relation to the direction of the planned imperial attack, the left flank was at Földvár, where the 3rd Battalion of the 24th (Parma) Infantry Regiment and the Landwehr Battalion of the Sivkovich Infantry Regiment arrived on 20 December. Under the command of General Schurrter, the new Austrian force arrived. He joined forces with Gedeon's army to create the numerical and technical superiority that would bring Háromszék to its knees.

The decisive battle was fought on 24 December at Hidvég.

== Sources ==
- Bona, Gábor, ed. (1999). The Hungarian Revolution and War of Independence. A Military History. War and Society in East Central Europe. Vol. XXXV. Translated by Arató, Nóra. Atlantic Research and Publications, Inc. ISBN 0-88033-433-9.
- Csikány, Tamás (2007), "A háromszéki kisháború 1848 decemberében ("The Little War from Háromszék in December 1848")" (PDF), Hadtörténelmi Közlemények 3/120 (in Hungarian)
- Demeter, Lajos (2006), "Háromszék 1848-ban, önvédelmi harca 1848 november 12. - január 5. között ("The Defensive War of Háromszék between 12 November 1848 - 5 January 1849")" (PDF), Acta 2006. Határvidék 1762–1918 (2. rész) (in Hungarian)
- Demeter, László (1868), "Gábor Áron Rákosnál (1848. deczemb. 13 ). ("Áron gábor at Rákos (13. December 1848)")" (PDF), Vasárnapi Újság - Tizenötödik évfolyam, 5-ik szám, 1868. február 2 (in Hungarian)
- Demeter, László (2006), "Kovachich Horváth Ignác alezredes emlékirata az 1848–49-es forradalom és szabadságharc székelyföldi eseményeiről ("Lieutenant Colonel Ignác Kovachich Horváth's Memoir about the Events in Székely Land of the 1848-1849 Revolution and War of Independence")" (PDF), Acta 2006. Határvidék 1762–1918 (1. rész) (in Hungarian)
- Hermann, Róbert (2001), 1848-1849 a szabadságharc hadtörténete ("Military History of 1848-1849") (in Hungarian), Budapest: Korona, ISBN 963-9376-21-3
- László, Zsigmond (1868), "Egy pár megjegyzés "Gábor Áron Rákosnál (1848. deczemb. 13 )" czimü közleményre. ("Few Comments about the Article with the Title "Áron gábor at Rákos (13. December 1848)"")" (PDF), Vasárnapi Újság -Tizenötödik évfolyam, 12-ik szám, 1868. márczius 22 (in Hungarian)
