= Vârghiș (disambiguation) =

Vârghiș may refer to the following places in Romania:

- Vârghiș, a commune in Covasna County
- Vârghiș, a tributary of the Olt in Harghita County
- Vârghiș (Cormoș), a tributary of the Cormoș in Harghita and Covasna Counties
