= Murgul Mare =

Mountain in Romania

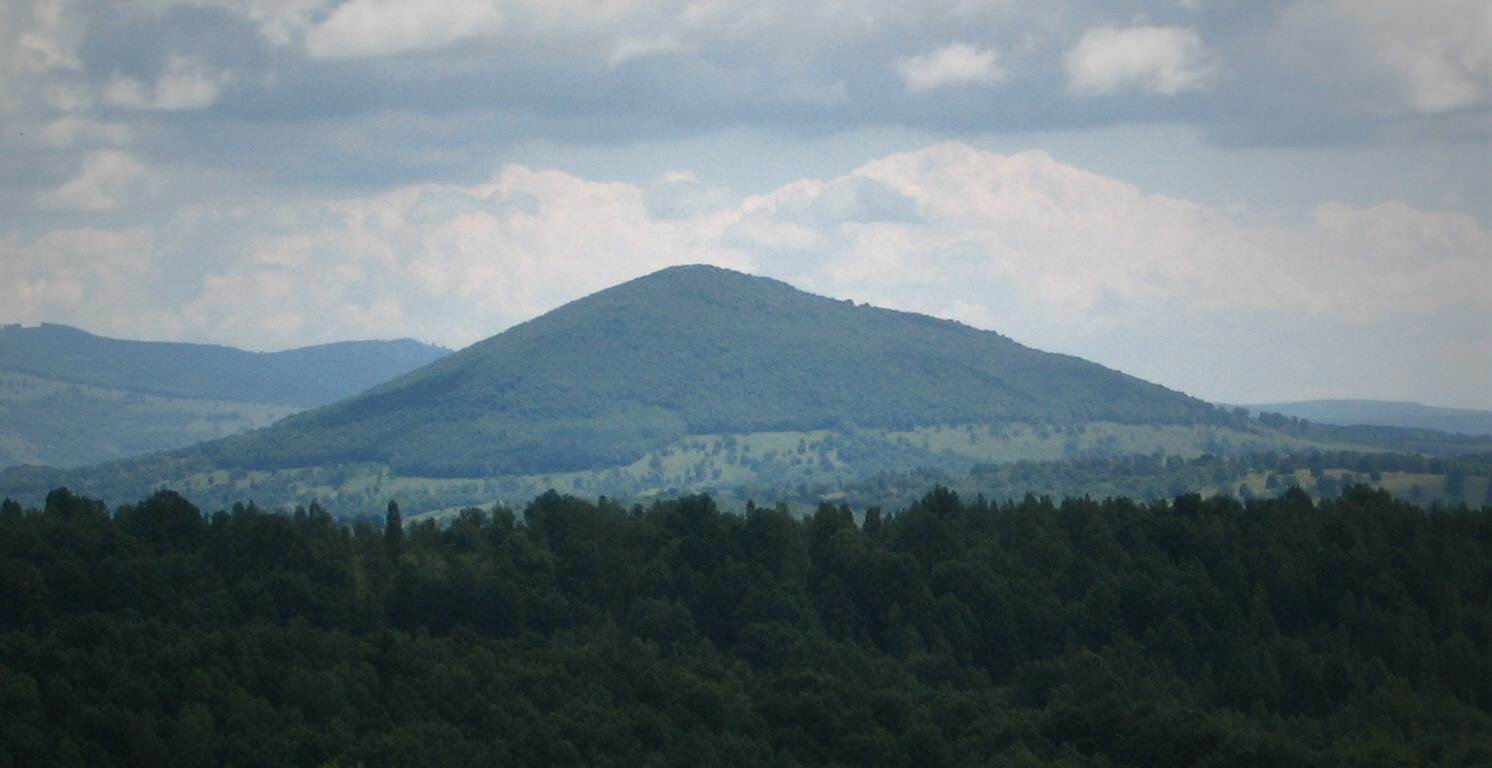

Highest point
- Elevation: 1,016 m (3,333 ft)
- Coordinates: 46°04′43″N 25°48′02″E

Geography
- Location: Covasna County, Romania

The Murgul Mare is a volcanic mountain near the village Malnaș in Covasna County, Romania. It lies at the northeastern end of the Baraolt Mountains. Its elevation is 1,016 m (3,333 ft).
