= Valea lui Ivan River =

Valea lui Ivan River (lit. Valley of the Ivan River) may refer to:

- Valea lui Ivan, a tributary of the Dâmbovița in Argeș County
- Valea lui Ivan, a tributary of the Sadu in Sibiu County

== See also ==
- Ivan River
