= Dacian fortress of Biborțeni =

- Location within Romania
- 46.091°N 25.656°E
- Location: Cetatea Tiborc, Cetatea lui Tiburţ, Biborţeni, Covasna, Romania

Site notes
- Condition: Ruined

Monument istoric
- Reference no.: CV-I-s-A-13041

It was a Dacian fortified town.
