= COSAG =

COSAG could refer to:

- Combined steam and gas
- Concerned South Africans Group

== See also ==
- Coșag, a tributary of the Cormoș in Romania
