= Albul =

Albul may refer to:

- Albul River, river in Romania

== People with the surname ==
- Anatoly Albul (1936–2013), Russian sport wrestler
