= Vârghiș (Cormoș) =

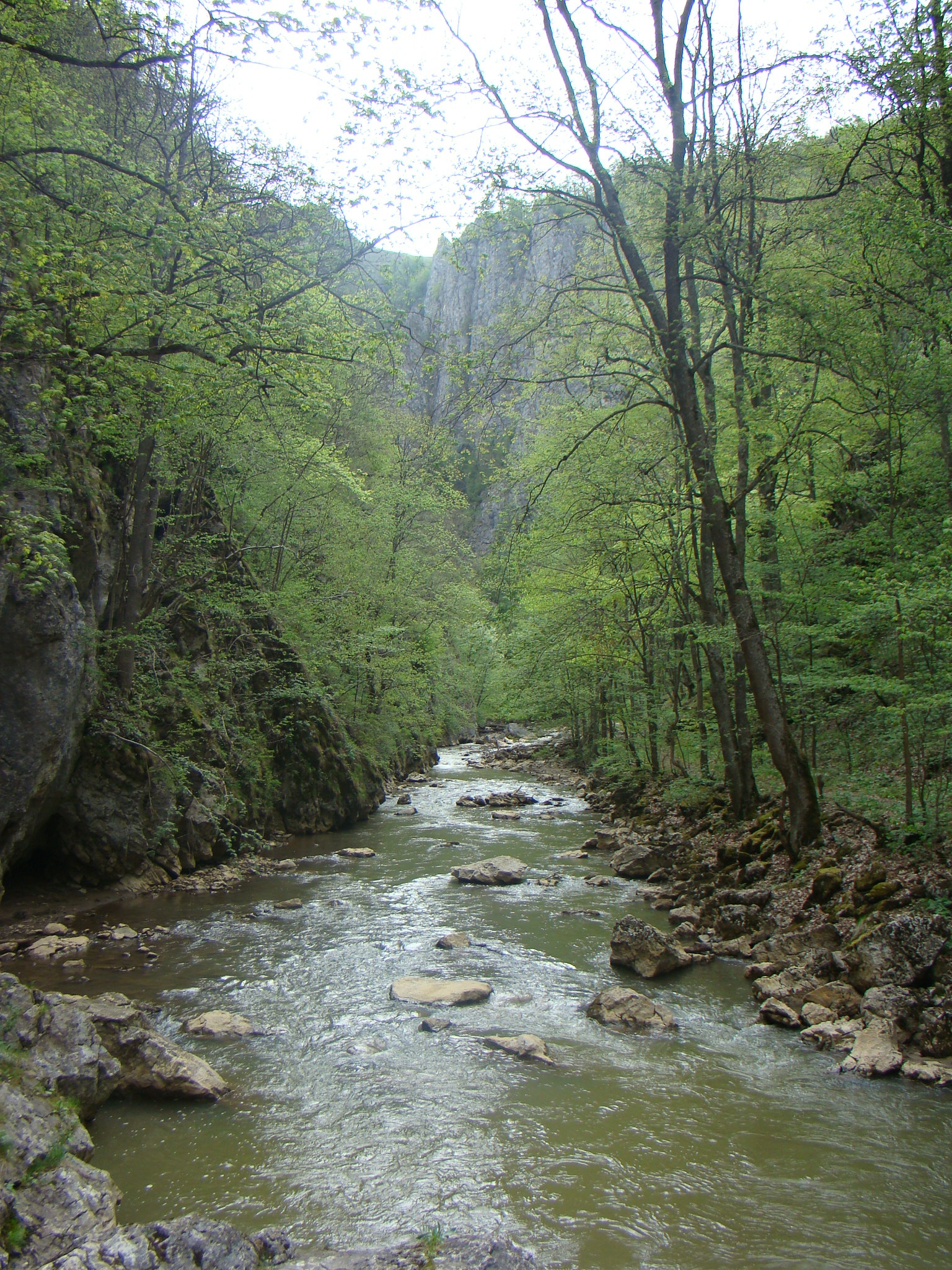

- Location within Romania

Location
- Country: Romania
- Counties: Harghita, Covasna
- Villages: Vârghiș

Physical characteristics
- Source: Harghita Mountains
- Mouth: Cormoș
  - coordinates: 46.0983°N 25.5681°E
- Length: 46 km (29 mi)
- Basin size: 245 km^{2} (95 sq mi)

Basin features
- Progression: Cormoș→ Olt→ Danube→ Black Sea
- Tributaries
  - left: Holoșag, Chirui
  - right: Pârâul Cepii
- River code: VIII.1.67.7

The Vârghiș is a right tributary of the river Cormoș in Romania. It discharges into the Cormoș near Tălișoara. Its length is 46 km (29 mi) and its basin size is 245 km^{2} (95 sq mi).
