= Ozunca =

- Location within Romania

Location
- Country: Romania
- Counties: Covasna County
- Villages: Ozunca-Băi, Bățanii Mari

Physical characteristics
- Mouth: Baraolt
  - coordinates: 46.0855°N 25.6712°E
- Length: 18 km (11 mi)
- Basin size: 96 km^{2} (37 sq mi)

Basin features
- Progression: Baraolt→ Olt→ Danube→ Black Sea
- Tributaries
  - left: Valea Întunecoasă, Pârâul Șeii
  - right: Pârâul Șoptitor

The Ozunca is a left tributary of the river Baraolt in Romania. It discharges into the Baraolt near Biborțeni. Its length is 18 km (11 mi) and its basin size is 96 km^{2} (37 sq mi). The name Ozunca is used mostly for the upper reach of the river, while the name Bățani is used for the lower reach.

== Tributaries ==
The following rivers are tributaries to the river Ozunca (from source to mouth):

- Left: Valea cu Cireși, Pârâul Sărat, Valea Întunecoasă, Apa Roșie, Groapa Pârâului, Pârâul Șeii, Bodoș
- Right: Pârâul cu Borviz, Păstrăvul, Valea cu Mure, Pârâul Șoptitor
