= Pârâul Bradului =

Pârâul Bradului may refer to the following rivers in Romania:

- Pârâul Bradului, a tributary of the Putna in Vrancea County
- Pârâul Bradului, a tributary of the Tecșe in Covasna County
