= Chirui (Vârghiș) =

River in Romania

- Location within Romania

Location
- Country: Romania
- Counties: Harghita County
- Villages: Băile Chirui

Physical characteristics
- Source: Harghita Mountains
- Mouth: Vârghiș
  - coordinates: 46.2768°N 25.5402°E
- Length: 16 km (9.9 mi)
- Basin size: 78 km^{2} (30 sq mi)

Basin features
- Progression: Vârghiș→ Cormoș→ Olt→ Danube→ Black Sea
- Tributaries
  - right: Gheopiu

The Chirui is a left tributary of the river Vârghiș in Romania. It flows into the Vârghiș near Băile Chirui. Its length is 16 km (9.9 mi) and its basin size is 78 km^{2} (30 sq mi).
