= Aita (river) =

River in Covasna, Romania

- Location within Romania

Location
- Country: Romania
- Counties: Covasna County
- Villages: Aita Seacă, Aita Medie, Aita Mare

Physical characteristics
- Source: Baraolt Mountains
- Mouth: Olt
  - location: Aita Mare
  - coordinates: 45.9753°N 25.5425°E
- Length: 25 km (16 mi)
- Basin size: 132 km^{2} (51 sq mi)

Basin features
- Progression: Olt→ Danube→ Black Sea
- Tributaries
  - left: Tecșe

The Aita (Hungarian: Ajta-patak, in its upper course also: Jemenc) is a right tributary of the river Olt in Romania. It discharges into the Olt in Aita Mare. Its length is 25 km (16 mi) and its basin size is 132 km^{2} (51 sq mi).

== Tributaries ==
The following rivers are tributaries to the river Aita (from source to mouth):

- Left: Pârâul lui Matis, Tecșe, Cocoș, Valea Mică
- Right: Valea Mare, Ulmul, Cenek, Pârâul Lung, Groapa Pietroasă
