= Nireș =

Nireș may refer to:

- Nireș, a village in the commune Mica in Cluj County, Romania
- Nireș, another name for the upper course of the Tecșe in Covasna County, Romania
- Nireș, a tributary of the Lăpuș in Maramureș County, Romania
