= Batani =

Batani may refer to:

- Bățani, a commune in Romania
- Bettani, a Pashtun tribe in Afghanistan and Pakistan
- Al-Battānī, a Muslim scientist during the Islamic Golden Age
