= Eduard Derzsei =

Romanian volleyball player (1934–2015)

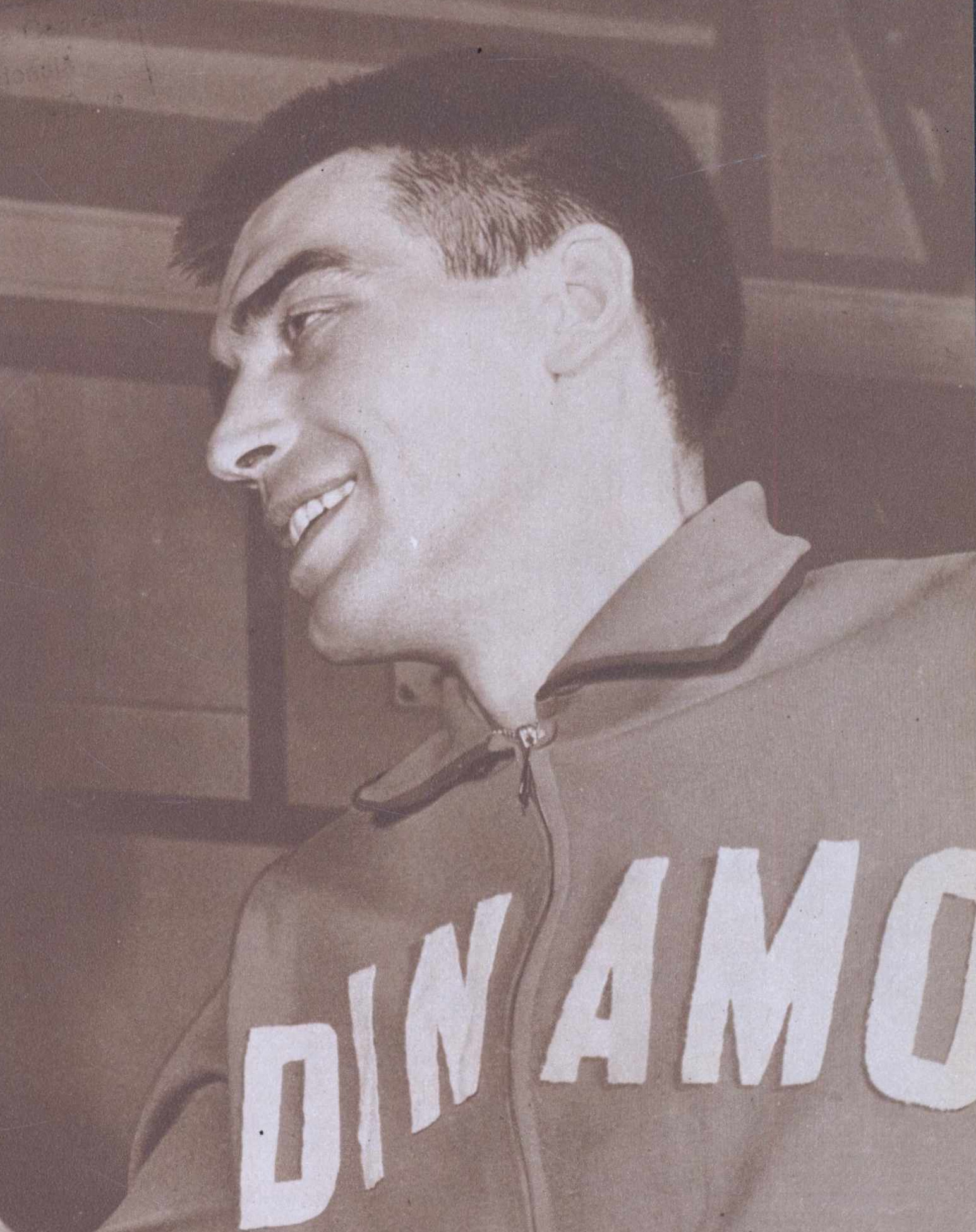
- Derzsei in 1966

Personal information
- Nationality: Romanian
- Born: 27 October 1934 Baraolt, Romania
- Died: 21 May 2015 (aged 80)

Sport
- Sport: Volleyball
Medal record
Men's volleyball
Representing Romania
World Championship
Silver medal – second place	1956 France	Team
Silver medal – second place	1966 Czechoslovakia	Team
Bronze medal – third place	1960 Brazil	Team
Bronze medal – third place	1962 Soviet Union	Team
European Championship
Gold medal – first place	1963 Romania	Team
Silver medal – second place	1955 Romania	Team
Silver medal – second place	1958 Czechoslovakia	Team

Eduard Derzsei (27 October 1934 – 21 May 2015) was a Romanian volleyball player. He competed in the men's tournament at the 1964 Summer Olympics.
