= Gavril Olteanu =

Romanian paramilitary militia leader

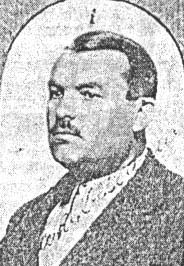

Personal details
- Born: 1888 Târgu Mureș, Austria-Hungary
- Died: 1946 (aged 57–58) Aiud Prison, Aiud, Kingdom of Romania
- Party: National Peasants' Party
- Profession: Paramilitary militia leader
- Known for: Sumanele Negre
- Criminal information
- Conviction: War crimes
- Penalty: Imprisonment

Details
- Victims: Hungarians

Gavril Olteanu (1888–1946) was a leader of a Romanian paramilitary militia group, part of the Maniu Guards during World War II, which became notorious for the killing and deportation of ethnic Hungarians in Transylvania.

Olteanu was born in Târgu Mureș (Marosvásárhely), Austria-Hungary in 1888. After Northern Transylvania was ceded by Romania to Hungary in 1940, as a result of the Second Vienna Award, he moved to Brașov. During World War II, this unit was active in Trei Scaune, Ciuc, Odorhei, and Mureș counties.

Following King Michael's Coup of 23 August 1944, Romania switched allegiance from the Axis powers to the Allies. In early September, Soviet and Romanian forces entered Transylvania, captured the towns of Brașov and Sibiu, and engaged units of the Hungarian 2nd Army and the German 8th Army at the Battle of Turda. On 26 September 1944, in reprisals against attacks on Romanian troops by the local population, members of the paramilitary Maniu Guard led by Olteanu massacred a number of Hungarian civilians in Aita Seacă village; 9 were shot, 2 decapitated, and 2 later died of their wounds. Other such incidents occurred in Sândominic, Huedin, Aghireș, and other localities around Transylvania.

At the request of Soviet representatives Deputy Foreign Minister Andrey Vyshinsky and Vladislav Petrovich Vinogradov on behalf of the Allied Control Commission, Romanian authorities disbanded the Maniu Guard, arrested Olteanu, and sentenced him to imprisonment. He died at Aiud Prison in late 1946; some sources claim he was murdered, while others claim that he committed suicide by ingesting strychnine.
