= Emília Zathureczky =

Hungarian museologist

Emilia Zathureczky
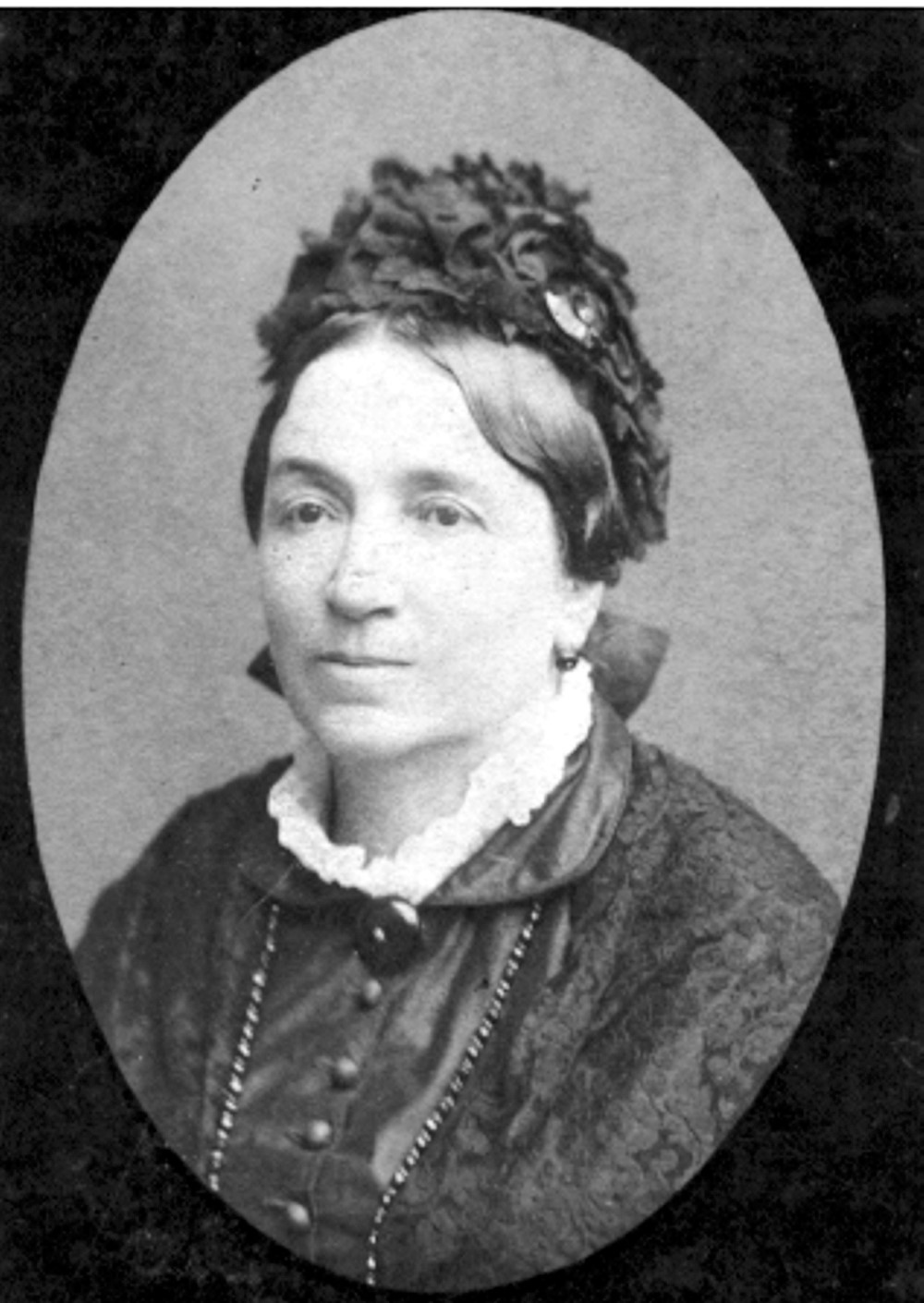
- Born: 21 October 1823; Olasztelek, Hungary
- Died: 5 November 1905 (aged 82); Imecsfalva, Hungary
- Burial place: Kézdivásárhely cemetery
- Other name: Mrs János Cserey
- Occupations: Museologist, benefactor
- Known for: Székely National Museum
- Children: Six

Emilia Zathureczky (Olasztelek, 21 October 1823 – Imecsfalva, 5 November 1905) was a Hungarian artifact collector, the founder of the Székely National Museum and helper of revolutionary fighters.

== Life and work ==
Emilia was born to István Zathureczky Zaturcsai (1795–1875) and Juliánna Tasnádi Nagy (1799–1878) who was a relative of the linguist-historian Gyula Nagy Tasnádi. Emilia was an educated child who learned Latin. From an early age, she enjoyed books, antiques, medals, and Stone Age, Bronze Age and other items she found while collecting.

During the 1848–1849 revolution and War of Independence, she gave money and jewelry to equip the national defense, embroidered flag ribbons and made lace. After the War of Independence, she hid fighters and helped them escape. In 1875, she founded the Székely National Museum in Sepsiszentgyörgy with Gyula Nagy Vasady. She created the basic collections and became its single most significant contributor until her final years. According to the Székely National Museum:

She donated to the Society of Fine Arts (Szekler ornaments, embroideries, other objects), she was the first collector of the Transylvanian Carpathian Association's Museum of Landscape and Ethnography, she contributed the bulk of the material from Szeklerland (in 1901, 300 of the 1,600 objects in the museum). She collected gentleman's embroideries, the three-tiered embroideries with scratched ornaments, bowls with human, animal and floral decorations, various thread-count and free-form embroideries; she concentrates on the beautifully decorated, representative pieces.

A community benefactor, in 1876 she raised funds for the benefit of flood victims. Between 1878 and 1879, she was the founding president of the Women's Charity of Sepsiszentgyörgy, which maintained the Háromszék county poorhouse between 1886 and 1897. The objects in the Cserey Museum were placed in the care of the Mikó Székely College (1879–1913).

Zathureczky died in 1905 and is buried in the Kézdivásárhely cemetery (now part of Romania).

== Legacy ==
Zathureczky founded or supported several institutions:

- Beneficial Women's Association of Sfântu Gheorghe
- Háromszék county poorhouse
- Sepsiszentgyörgy women's industrial school
- Háromszék County Erzsébet orphanage
- Stefánia Asylum
- Rudolf Hospital

== Family ==
In 1841, Emilia married a church caretaker János Cserey (1817–1875) and was widowed in 1875. They had six children: Balázs (1844–1869), Gizella (1848–1850), István (1849–1860), Ákos (1856–1905) member of the county committee, Gyula (1857–1883) and Mihály (1865–1872).

Emilia's younger brother, Károly Zathureczky (1832–1889), compiled a "serious medal collection and donated it to the Cluj Museum Association."
