= Tecșe =

- Location within Romania

Location
- Country: Romania
- Counties: Covasna County
- Villages: Valea Zălanului

Physical characteristics
- Source: Baraolt Mountains
- Mouth: Aita
  - coordinates: 46.0024°N 25.6646°E
- Length: 13 km (8.1 mi)
- Basin size: 47 km^{2} (18 sq mi)

Basin features
- Progression: Aita→ Olt→ Danube→ Black Sea
- Tributaries
  - left: Anaș

The Tecșe (in its upper course also: Nireș) is a left tributary of the river Aita in Romania. It flows into the Aita south of Aita Seacă. Its length is 13 km (8.1 mi) and its basin size is 47 km^{2} (18 sq mi).

== Tributaries ==
The following rivers are tributaries to the river Tecșe (from source to mouth):

- Left: Ivan, Anaș, Pârâul Bradului, Pârâul Ierbos, Pietrosu de Sus, Pietrosu de Jos, Pârâul Minei, Cacuci
- Right: Catrina, Izvorul Bogat
