= Brăduț =

Brăduț Bardóc
- Commune
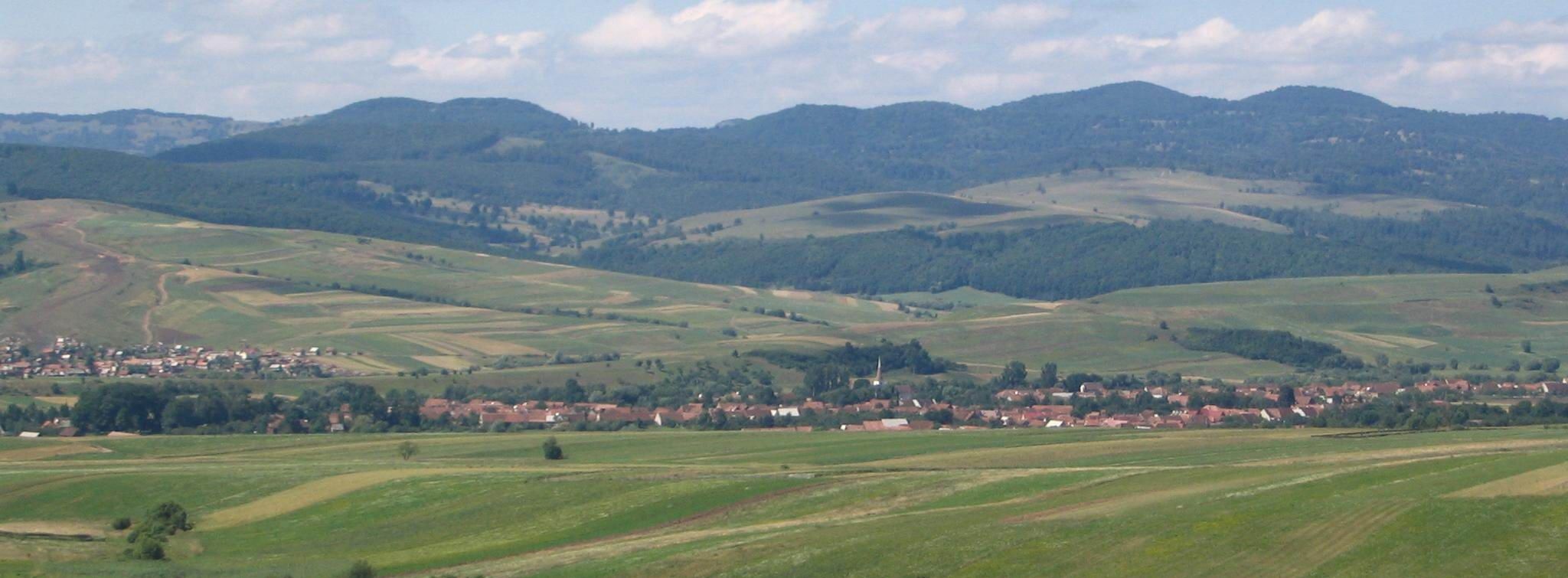

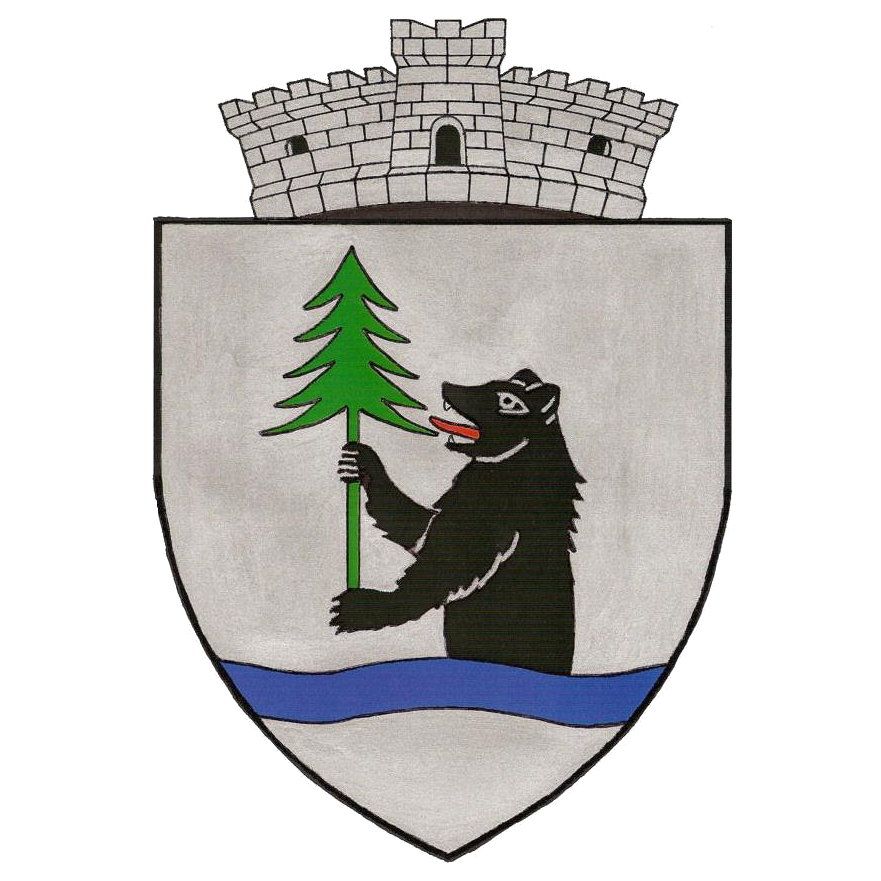
- Coat of arms

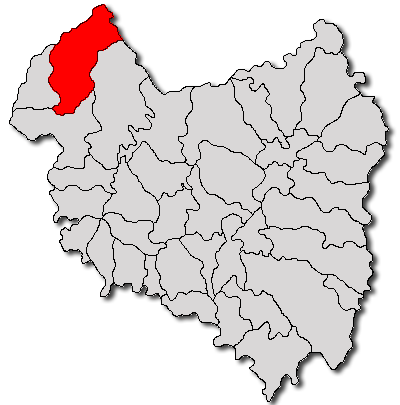
- Location in Covasna County

- Location in Romania
- Coordinates: 46°8′N 25°37′E
- Country: Romania
- County: Covasna

Government
  - Mayor (2020–2024): Dénes Balázsi (UDMR)
- Area: 169.73 km^{2} (65.53 sq mi)
- Elevation: 503 m (1,650 ft)
- Population (2021-12-01): 4,923
  - Density: 29.00/km^{2} (75.12/sq mi)
- Time zone: UTC+02:00 (EET)
  - Summer (DST): UTC+03:00 (EEST)
- Postal code: 527055
- Area code: (+40) 02 67
- Vehicle reg.: CV
- Website: www.comunabradut.ro

Brăduț (Romanian: Brăduț; Hungarian: Bardóc) is a commune in Covasna County, Transylvania, Romania composed of four villages: Brăduț, Doboșeni (Székelyszáldobos), Filia (Erdőfüle), and Tălișoara (Olasztelek).

== Geography ==
The commune is situated in the northeastern foothills of the Perșani Mountains, at an altitude of 503 m (1,650 ft), in the valley of the river Cormoș. It is located in the northwestern extremity of Covasna County, just north of the town of Baraolt and 52 km (32 mi) from the county seat, Sfântu Gheorghe, on the border with Harghita County. Brăduț may be accessed from the south by county road DJ131, followed by communal road DC42.

== Demographics ==
Historical population
Year	Pop.	±%
1850	2,672	—
1920	3,780	+41.5%
1966	4,530	+19.8%
2002	4,688	+3.5%
2011	4,728	+0.9%
2021	4,923	+4.1%
Source: Census data

The commune has an absolute Székely Hungarian majority. According to the 2002 census, it had a population of 4,688, of which 83.64% or 3,921 were Hungarians. At the 2021 census, Brăduț had a population of 4,923; of those, 65.33% were Hungarians, 24.86% Roma, and 4.57% Romanians.

== Brăduț ==
In Hungarian, the village is called Bardóc. It is centrally located within the commune. Its first mention as "Bardach" dates back to 1333. The only high school and clinic of the commune are here.

== Doboșeni ==
In Hungarian, the village is called Székelyszáldobos, meaning "The only Székely drummer". A legend explains this name by the only survivor of the Mongol-Tatar invasion who was a drummer. According to another legend, this village appeared after the Mongol-Tatar invasion, when the population of the earlier villages Dobó and Valál resettled here.

Many mineral water springs exist around the village. Some people get their mineral water by lowering a bottle attached to a stick into a well near the South end of the village. There is a significant (and growing) Roma population near the North end of the village.

== Filia ==
In Hungarian, the village is called Erdőfüle, meaning the "ear of the forest". However, the first part of the name probably comes from the name of the area, Erdővidék (Forest-Land). It is the largest village of the commune, nearly fused with Bardóc. The group of buildings between the two villages is amusingly referred to as "Ésfalu" (And-village).

Since the nearby mountains are rich in iron ore, this was one of the villages where cannons were cast during the Hungarian Revolution of 1848. The building where the cannons were made still stands.

== Tălișoara ==
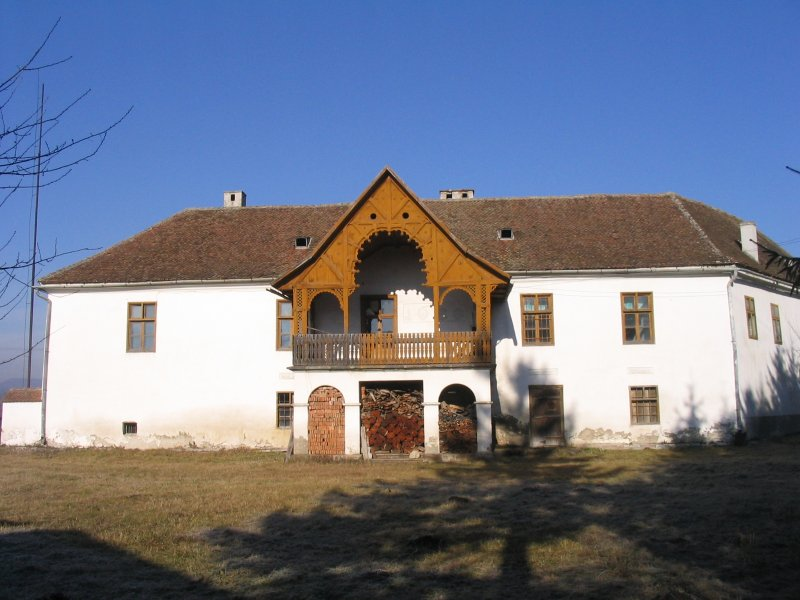
Daniel Castle of Tălișoara (Castelul Daniel din Tălișoara)

In Hungarian, the village of Tălișoara is called Olasztelek, meaning "Italian settlement" and referring to the Italian colonists settled there by Charles I of Hungary. Family names of Italian origin are still common in the village (Kolumbán, Márkó).

Of the buildings in the village, the historic castle of the Dániel family (built around 1609), the Calvinist-Reformed church (rebuilt in 1858) and its steeple (built in 1795) are noteworthy. The oldest object in the village is probably the smaller of the two church bells in the steeple, which bears the inscription "Ad honorem Sancti Martini et omnium Sanctorum – 1489".

Carbonated mineral water springs and other signs of past volcanic activity are common around the village. People still remember the springs called Nyillaki, Fingó, and Bolond. Of these, only the Bolond (Crazy) spring is still active, due to the mining attempt near Vârghiș in the late 1980s. In an attempt to pump out the vast underground mineral water layer that covered the coal, the project only managed to decimate the mineral water springs in the area. However, mineral water still found its way back to the surface.

After the fall of the Communist regime and the termination of the infamous mining project, springs soon appeared in new locations around the village. Also of volcanic origin, the Likaskő is a cone-shaped formation with a hole in the middle, which resembles some of the geysers in Yellowstone National Park, except it is empty inside.

Emília Zathureczky (1823–1905), an artifact collector, was born in the village.
