= Malnaș =

Malnaș Málnás
- Commune
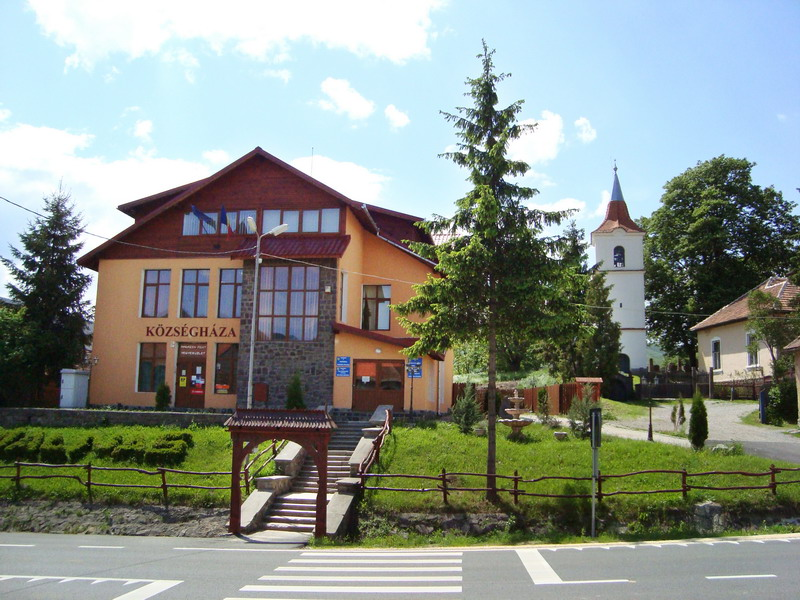
- Malnaș town hall

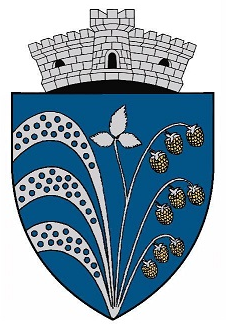
- Coat of arms

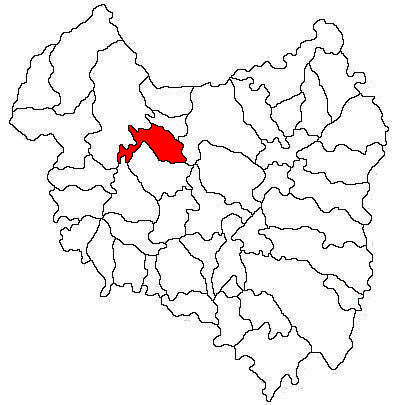
- Location in Covasna County

- Location in Romania
- Coordinates: 46°1′N 25°50′E
- Country: Romania
- County: Covasna

Government
  - Mayor (2020–2024): Angéla-Gizella Szotyori (UDMR)
- Area: 40.86 km^{2} (15.78 sq mi)
- Elevation: 572 m (1,877 ft)
- Population (2021-12-01): 1,024
  - Density: 25.06/km^{2} (64.91/sq mi)
- Time zone: UTC+02:00 (EET)
  - Summer (DST): UTC+03:00 (EEST)
- Postal code: 527117
- Area code: (+40) 02 67
- Vehicle reg.: CV
- Website: primariamalnas.ro

Malnaș (Hungarian: Málnás, Hungarian pronunciation: [ˈmaːlnaːʃ]) is a commune in Covasna County, Transylvania Romania composed of three villages: Malnaș, Malnaș-Băi (Málnásfürdő), and Valea Zălanului (Zalánpatak). In 2004, Bixad and Micfalău split from Malnaș and formed independent communes.

== Geography ==
The commune is located in the northern part of Covasna County, 18 km (11 mi) north of the county seat, Sfântu Gheorghe, on the banks of the Olt River. It is situated northeast of the Baraolt Mountains, in the western foothills of the Bodoc Mountains, at an altitude of 572 m (1,877 ft); Murgul Mare is a nearby volcanic mountain.

Malnaș is crossed by national road DN12, which starts in Chichiș and ends in Toplița. The train stations in Malnaș and Malnaș-Băi serve the CFR Main Line 400, which connects Brașov with Satu Mare.

== Demographics ==
Historical population
Year	Pop.	±%
1850	845	—
1930	1,281	+51.6%
1977	1,366	+6.6%
2002	1,202	−12.0%
2011	1,087	−9.6%
2021	1,024	−5.8%
Source: Census data

The commune has an absolute Székely Hungarian majority. According to the 2002 census, the commune as constituted then had a population of 4,877, of which 96.49% were Hungarians (the population within present boundaries was 1,202). At the 2011 census, it had 1,087 inhabitants, of which 92.36% were Hungarians and 5.89% Romanians. At the 2021 census, Malnaș had a population of 1,024, of which 88.28% were Hungarians, 5.47% Romanians, and 1.17% Roma.

== Valea Zălanului ==
Valea Zălanului village, with a population of 149 in 2002, was first settled in the 16th century. In 2008, Charles, Prince of Wales bought a house in the village, which was probably founded by one of the Prince's Transylvanian ancestors. By 2013, when he made another purchase, he had four houses there.
