= Doppelhaken =

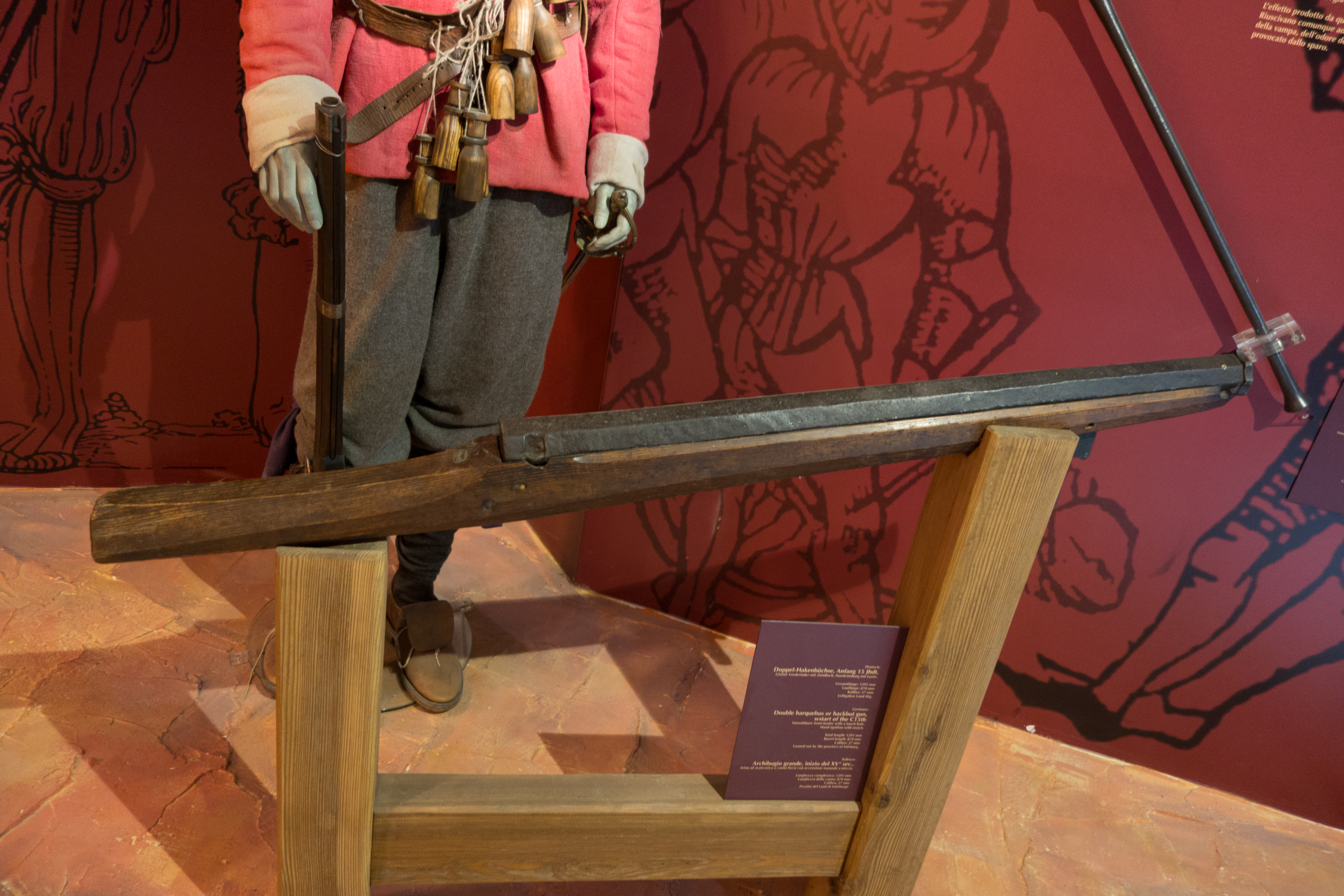
A double arquebus from Austria, early 16th century. It has no lock.

Doppelhaken (German: Doppelhaken/Doppelhacken, Croatian: dvopuška, Latin: Barbatae maiores sive dupplae), a very heavy variant of matchlock arquebus, used as light artillery in Germany and Habsburg empire in 16th century. Its name can be translated as double-hook-gun or double arquebus. It was the forerunner to the early (heavy) muskets.

== History ==
=== Name ===
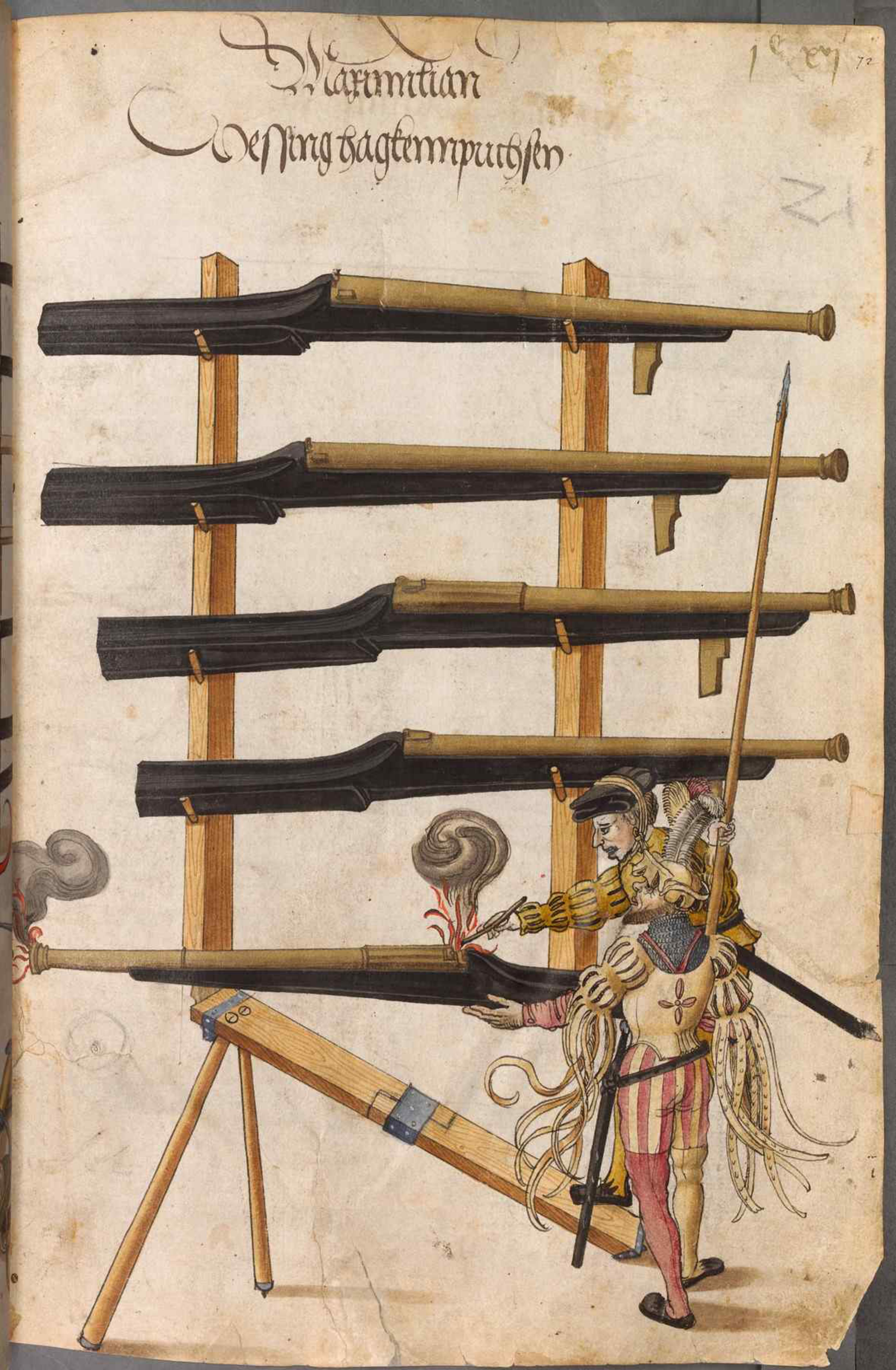
Two soldiers firing a double arquebus from a wooden stand: illustration from the time of Emperor Maximilian (1493–1519), made around 1502.

German and Austrian sources from the 16th century mention the so-called double arquebuses (German: Doppelhaken, literally double hook, a shorter form of the German word Doppelhakenbüchse, which means double arquebus), and August Šenoa translated this term as double gun (Croatian: dvopuška) in his popular novel The Peasant Revolt (Croatian: Seljačka buna), written in 1878.

In the German military registers of the 16th century, the term Doppelhaken was sometimes used generally for any arquebus (German: Hakenbüchse or Haken), and sometimes specifically for heavier weapons of the larger caliber, which can be differentiated in Latin sources (Latin: Barbatae maiores sive dupplae).

=== Description ===
Despite its name, double arquebus did not have two barrels, but was actually a much larger and heavier version of an ordinary arquebus - so it was double the size of a regular arquebus. Due to their significantly larger caliber (over 20 mm) and weight (up to 32 kg), they were fired exclusively from a stand, most often a fortress wall, an iron fork stuck in the ground, or a swivel mount placed on the deck of river warships. The oldest ones had only a gun barrel (with a touch hole or a priming pan) and a stock, with a total length of about 2 meters, and were manned by two soldiers. Later they were equipped with a lock (matchlock at first, then with a wheellock), so they could be used by a single man.

A common German arquebus of the 16th and 17th century had the caliber of 20 to 25 mm, and fired lead balls that weighted about 1/8 of a pound (around 56 g). The size of the German arquebuses varied between 1.2 and 2 m, and their weight between 7 and 14 kg. The larger double arquebuses were on the upper end of this range: their ammunition was twice as heavy (up to 1/4 of a pound), and their range was up to 500 m.

=== Price ===
In 1577. Habsburg monarchy, a double arquebus cost 4 gold pieces (forints), compared to a light matchlock arquebus that cost only 3 forints together with a powder flask, or a wheellock arquebus, which cost 4.5 forints (powder flask included). For comparison, at the same time a pike cost only 1/4 of a forint, a halberd 1 forint, a sword 1.5 forints, and a helmet 4 forints.

=== Usage ===
Due to its heavy weight, double arquebus was mostly used as a stationary weapon, a light form of artillery, for wall defense during sieges. It was probably in use since the first half of the 15th century, or at least since 1470s.

Extant documents from 1573 show that double arquebuses were used extensively by Austrian troops from Carniola during the Croatian-Slovene Peasant Revolt, and the rebels captured over 30 pieces in conquered castles.

The weapons were still in use on both sides during Austrian-Ottoman War of 1663–1664.

=== Evolution to musket ===
About 1520, Spanish gunsmiths made a lighter, portable version of double arquebus, that could be used effectively in the open field. The new weapons were called muskets, to differentiate from the contemporary (and much lighter) arquebuses, that were lighter than 5 kg. However, the first Spanish heavy muskets, able to penetrate even the heavy armor, were originally just a smaller version of the older doppelhaken, which was used in fort defense for nearly a century before.

=== Legacy ===
A large number have survived to this day in German and Austrian museums.

== Literature ==
- Hall, Bert S. (1997). Weapons and warfare in renaissance Europe: gunpowder, technology, and tactics. Johns Hopkins studies in the history of technology. Baltimore, Md: Johns Hopkins University Press. p. 177. ISBN 978-0-8018-5531-3.
- Štefanec, Nataša (2022). "Arms Race on the Habsburg-Ottoman Border in the 16th Century: Arsenals, Small Firearms, Artillery and Ammunition on the Croatian and Slavonian Military Border". In Kursar, Vjeran (ed.). Life on the Ottoman Border: Essays in Honour of Nenad Moačanin. Zagreb: FF Press.
- Rački, Franjo (2023) [1875]. "Gradja za poviest hrvatsko-slovenske seljačke bune god. 1573." [Sources for the history of the Croatian-Slovene peasant revolt of 1573.]. In Zidarić, Željko (ed.). Peasant Uprising of 1573 in Croatia and Slovenia: Historical Accounts. pp. 49, 76, 91–93.
- von Radics, Peter (2023) [1862]. "Herbard VIII, Freiherr zu Auersperg (1528-1575): ein krainischer Held und Staatsmann" [Herbard VIII, Baron of Auersperg (1528-1575): a Carniolan hero and statesman]. In Zidarić, Željko (ed.). Peasant Uprising of 1573 in Croatia and Slovenia: Historical Accounts. pp. 153, 161.
- Dimitz, August (2023) [1875]. "Geschichte Krains von der altesten Zeit bis auf das Jahr 1813" [History of Carniola from ancient times to the year 1813]. In Zidarić, Željko (ed.). Peasant Uprising of 1573 in Croatia and Slovenia: Historical Accounts. p. 180.
- Šenoa, August (1878). Seljačka buna [The Peasant Revolt] (PDF). Загреб. p. 126.
- Radovanovic, Sasa (2025). Austrian-Ottoman War of 1663–1664. p. 64.
