= Baraolt (river) =

- Location within Romania

Location
- Country: Romania
- Counties: Covasna County
- Villages: Herculian, Bățanii Mici, Biborțeni, Baraolt

Physical characteristics
- Mouth: Olt
  - location: Căpeni
  - coordinates: 46.0469°N 25.5573°E
- Length: 40 km (25 mi)
- Basin size: 221 km^{2} (85 sq mi)

Basin features
- Progression: Olt→ Danube→ Black Sea
- Tributaries
  - left: Brad, Ozunca

The Baraolt is a right tributary of the river Olt in Romania. It discharges into the Olt in Căpeni. Its length is 40 km (25 mi) and its basin size is 221 km^{2} (85 sq mi).

== Tributaries ==
The following rivers are tributaries to the river Baraolt:

- Left: Durca, Brad, Macicaș, Ozunca, Pârâul Cetății, Pârâul Uscat
- Right: Herculian, Biucoș, Agriș, Pârâul Lupului, Dungo
