= Cormoș =

Cormoș Kormos
- Location within Romania

Location
- Country: Romania
- Counties: Harghita, Covasna
- Villages: Filia, Brăduț, Tălișoara, Racoșul de Sus

Physical characteristics
- Source: Harghita Mountains
- Mouth: Olt
  - coordinates: 46.0527°N 25.5513°E
- Length: 54 km (34 mi)
- Basin size: 545 km^{2} (210 sq mi)

Basin features
- Progression: Olt→ Danube→ Black Sea
- Tributaries
  - right: Vârghiș
- River code: VIII.1.67

The Cormoș (Hungarian: Kormos) is a right tributary of the river Olt in Romania. It discharges into the Olt in Racoșul de Sus. Its length is 54 km (34 mi) and its basin size is 545 km^{2} (210 sq mi).

== Tributaries ==
The following rivers are tributaries to the river Cormoș (from source to mouth):

- Left: Chișag, Fierarul, Gherend, Coșag, Șar, Agriș, Hotarul
- Right: Bătătura Cailor, Sic, Vârghiș, Rica
