= Bățani =

Bățani Nagybacon
- Commune
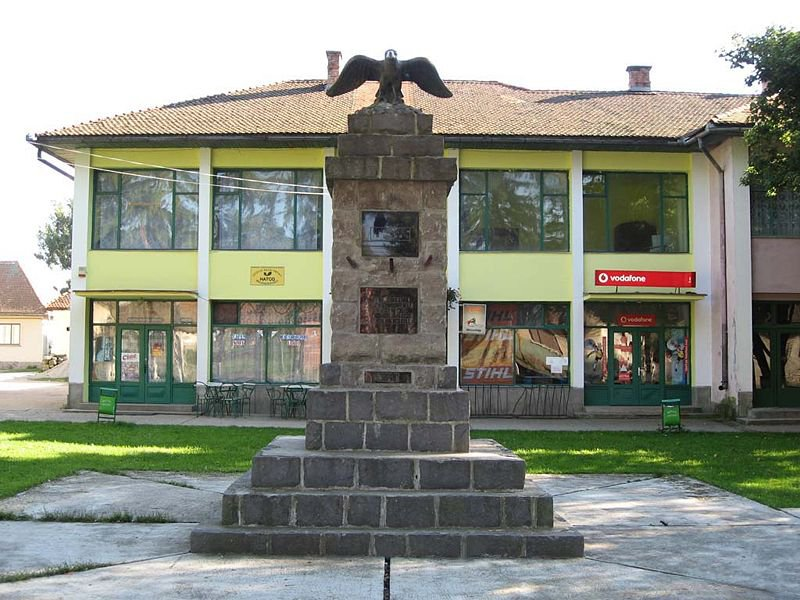
- Millecentennial monument

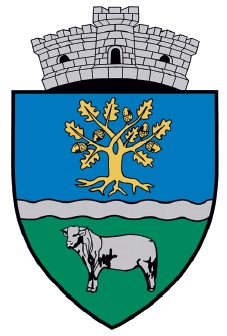
- Coat of arms

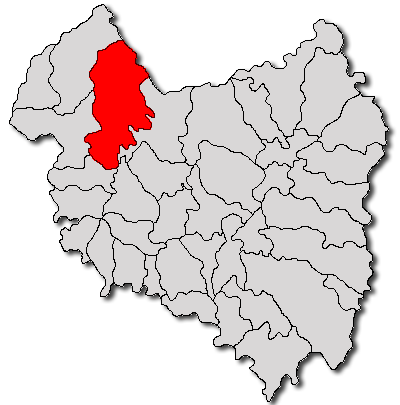
- Location in Covasna County

- Location in Romania
- Coordinates: 46°5′22″N 25°41′29″E
- Country: Romania
- County: Covasna

Government
  - Mayor (2020–2024): Andras Simon (UDMR)
- Area: 215 km^{2} (83 sq mi)
- Elevation: 535 m (1,755 ft)
- Highest elevation: 640 m (2,100 ft)
- Lowest elevation: 518 m (1,699 ft)
- Population (2021-12-01): 4,588
  - Density: 21.3/km^{2} (55.3/sq mi)
- Time zone: UTC+02:00 (EET)
  - Summer (DST): UTC+03:00 (EEST)
- Postal code: 527010
- Area code: (+40) 02 67
- Vehicle reg.: CV
- Website: nagybacon.ro

Bățani (Hungarian: Nagybacon, Hungarian pronunciation: [nɒɟbɒtson]) is a commune in Covasna County, Transylvania, Romania. It lies in the Székely Land, an ethno-cultural region in eastern Transylvania.

The commune, with its center at Bățanii Mari, is composed of five villages: Aita Seacă (Szárazajta), Bățanii Mari (Nagybacon), Bățanii Mici (Kisbacon), Herculian (Magyarhermány), and Ozunca-Băi (Uzonkafürdő).

== Geography ==
The commune is located in the northwestern part of Covasna County, 39 km (24 mi) from the county seat, Sfântu Gheorghe, on the border with Harghita County. It lies at the foot of the Baraolt Mountains, on the banks of the Baraolt, Ozunca, and Aita rivers.

== Demographics ==
During the 2002 census, Bățani had a population of 4,501, of which 3,962 of its inhabitants, or 88.02%, were ethnic Hungarians. According to the 2011 census, the commune had a population of 4,403, of which 83.08% were ethnic Hungarians, 12.24% Roma, and 1.41% Romanians; for 3.27% of the population, the ethnicity was unknown. From a confessional point of view, most of the inhabitants were Reformed (75.15%), but there were also minorities of Pentecostals (11.83%), Roman Catholics (4.61%), and Orthodox (2.09%); for 3.5% of the population, the confessional affiliation was not known. At the 2021 census, there were 4,588 inhabitants; of those, 78.64% were Hungarians, 13.86% Roma, and 1.22% Romanians.

== History ==
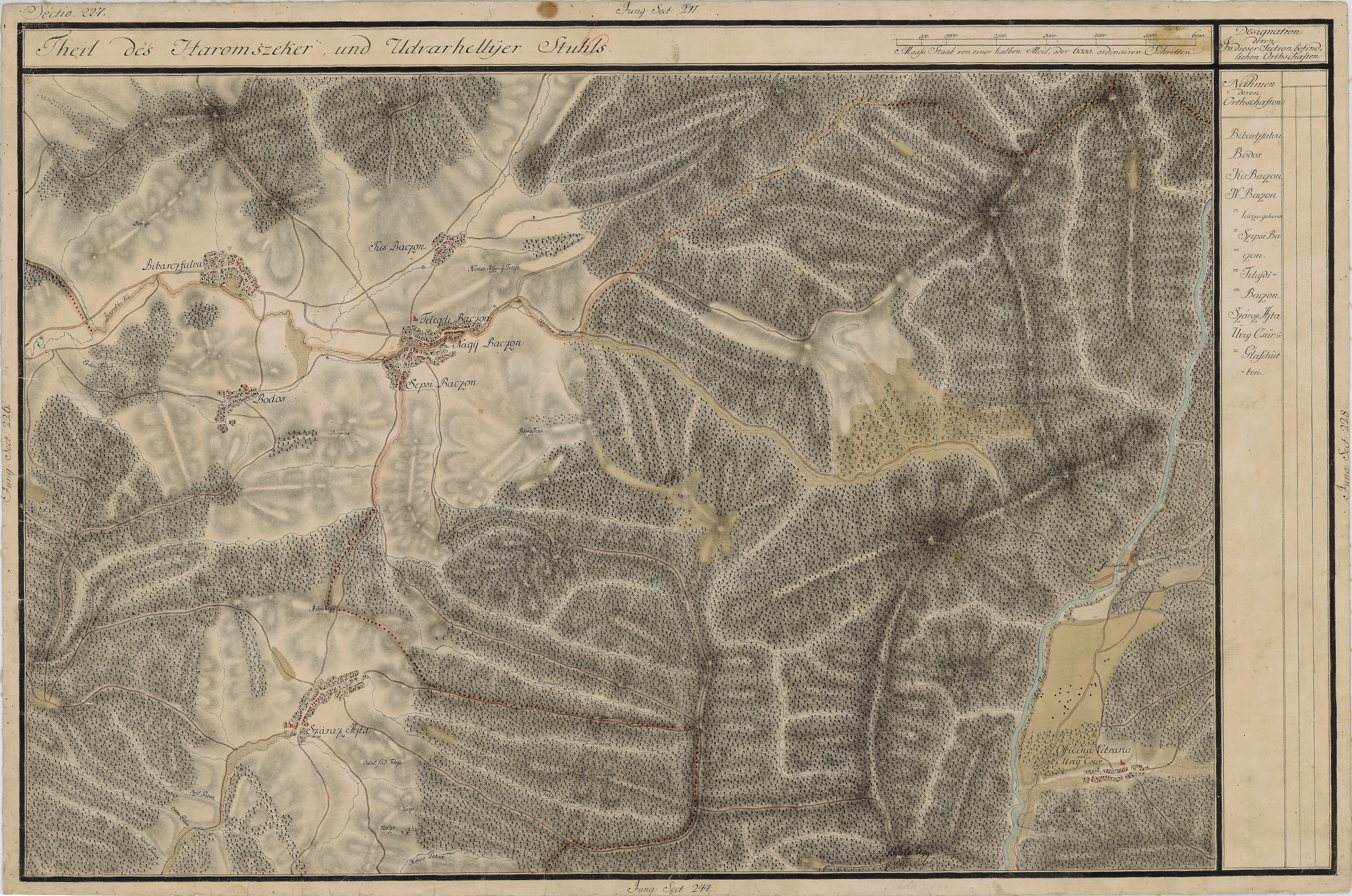
Bățani on the Josephinian Land Survey, 1769-1773

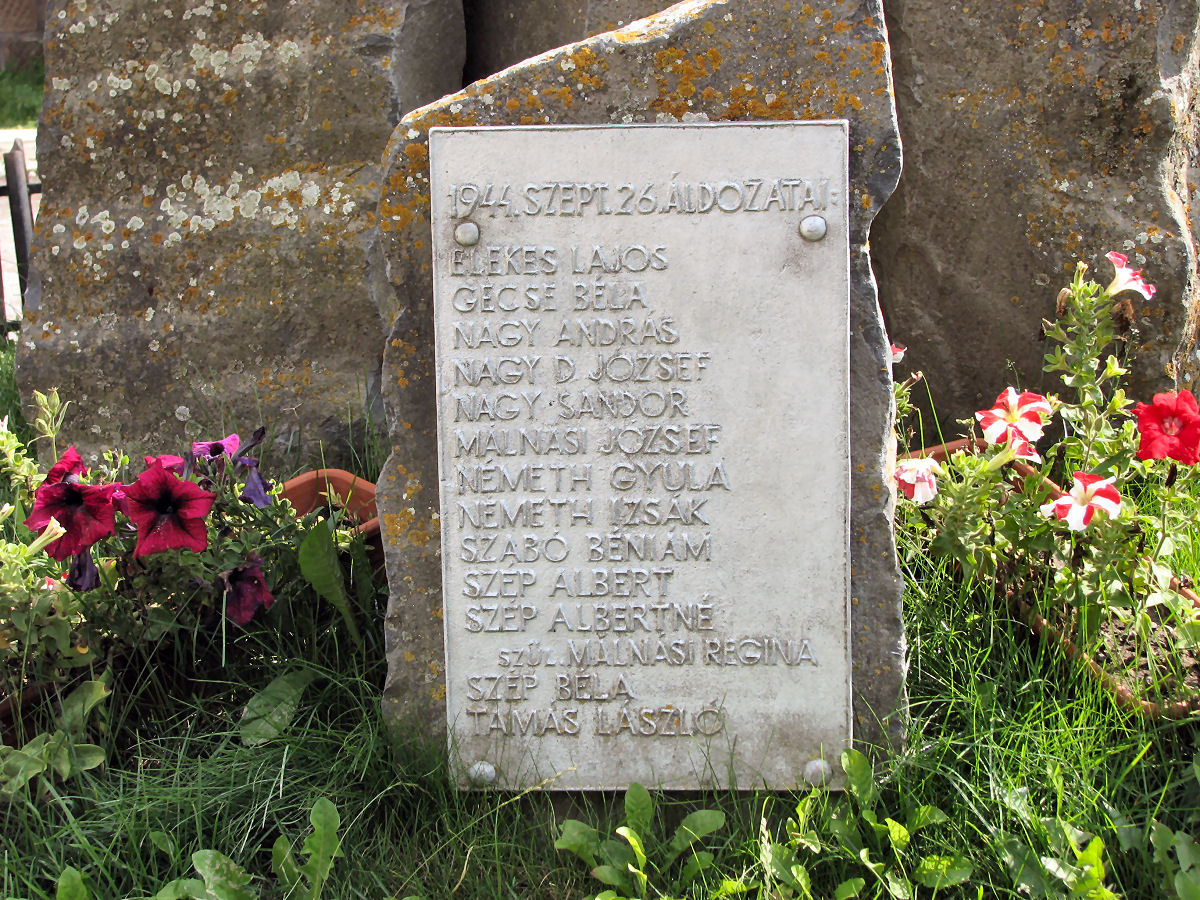
Memorial of the victims killed by Maniu Guard on 26 September 1944

The locality formed part of the Székely Land region of the historical Transylvania province. Until the end of World War I, it belonged to the Háromszék County of the Kingdom of Hungary. After the Hungarian–Romanian War of 1919, it passed under Romanian administration, and after the Treaty of Trianon of 1920, it became part of the Kingdom of Romania. From 1925, Bățani belonged to plasa Baraolt, in Trei Scaune County, and from 1938, to Ținutul Argeș.

After the Second Vienna Award in 1940 the commune with all of Northern Transylvania came under Hungarian control for four years. During World War II, ethnic conflicts took place in this area. After the Royal coup d'état of August 1944, Romania switched sides to the Allies; soon after, Romanian Vânători de munte troops entered Covasna County, but were stopped by the defending Hungarian and German Armies. On 4 September 1944, according to claims of local Romanians, 13 to 100 retreating Romanian soldiers were supposedly captured in Szárazajta (Aita Seacă) by the locals, and were tortured and killed. On 26 September 1944, members of the irregular paramilitary Maniu Guard led by Gavril Olteanu massacred thirteen Székelys in Aita Seacă village in a revenge attack.

Following the administrative reforms implemented by the communist regime in 1950, the commune became part of the Stalin Region, and from 1952, part of the Magyar Autonomous Region, while in 1968 it became part of Covasna County.

== Natives ==
- Elek Benedek (1859–1929), journalist and writer
