= Vârghiș =

Vârghiș Vargyas
- Commune
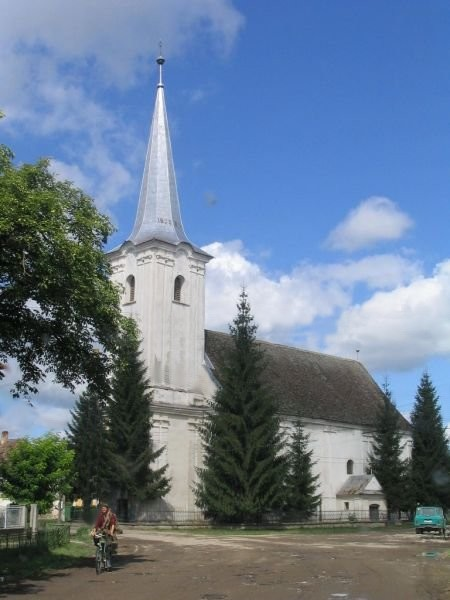
- Unitarian church in Vârghiș

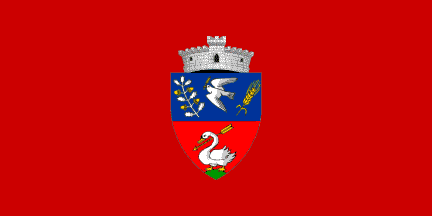
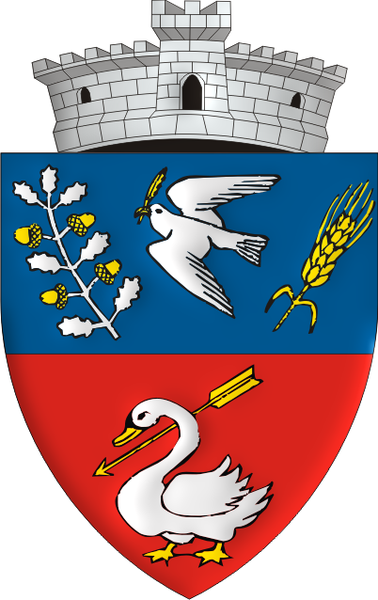
- Flag Coat of arms

- Location in Covasna County

- Location in Romania
- Coordinates: 46°08′N 25°32′E
- Country: Romania
- County: Covasna

Government
  - Mayor (2020–2024): Lajos Imets (UDMR)
- Area: 70.24 km^{2} (27.12 sq mi)
- Elevation: 498 m (1,634 ft)
- Population (2021-12-01): 1,472
  - Density: 20.96/km^{2} (54.28/sq mi)
- Time zone: UTC+02:00 (EET)
  - Summer (DST): UTC+03:00 (EEST)
- Postal code: 527180
- Area code: (+40) 02 67
- Vehicle reg.: CV
- Website: varghis.ro

Vârghiș (Hungarian: Vargyas, Hungarian pronunciation: [ˈvɒrɟɒʃ]) is a commune in Covasna County, Transylvania, Romania. It is composed of a single village, Vârghiș.

== History ==
The village formed part of the Székely Land region of the historical Transylvania province. Until 1918, it belonged to the Háromszék County of the Kingdom of Hungary. In the immediate aftermath of World War I, following the declaration of the Union of Transylvania with Romania, the area passed under Romanian administration during the Hungarian–Romanian War of 1918–1919. By the terms of the Treaty of Trianon of 1920, it became part of the Kingdom of Romania.

In 1925, the commune fell in Plasa Baraolt of Trei Scaune County. In August 1940, under the auspices of Nazi Germany, which imposed the Second Vienna Award, Hungary retook the territory of Northern Transylvania (which included Vârghiș) from Romania. Towards the end of World War II, however, the commune was taken back from Hungarian and German troops by Romanian and Soviet forces in September 1944.

In 1950, after Communist Romania was established, Vârghiș became part of the Sfântu Gheorghe Raion of Stalin Region. From 1952 and 1960, it was part of the Magyar Autonomous Region, and between 1960 and 1968 it reverted to Brașov Region. In 1968, when Romania was reorganized based on counties rather than regions, the commune became part of Covasna County.

== Demographics ==
Historical population
Year	Pop.	±%
1850	1,474	—
1941	2,088	+41.7%
1966	2,218	+6.2%
2002	1,902	−14.2%
2011	1,647	−13.4%
2021	1,472	−10.6%
Source: Census data

The commune has an absolute Székely Hungarian majority. According to the 2011 census, it had a population of 1,647, of which 97.87% were Hungarians and 0.6% were Romanians. At the 2021 census, Vârghiș had a population of 1,472, of which 92.46% were Hungarians, 1.36% Roma, and 0.48% were Romanians.
