= Baraolt Mountains =

Mountain range in the Inner Eastern Carpathians

Coordinates: 46°00′N 25°45′E

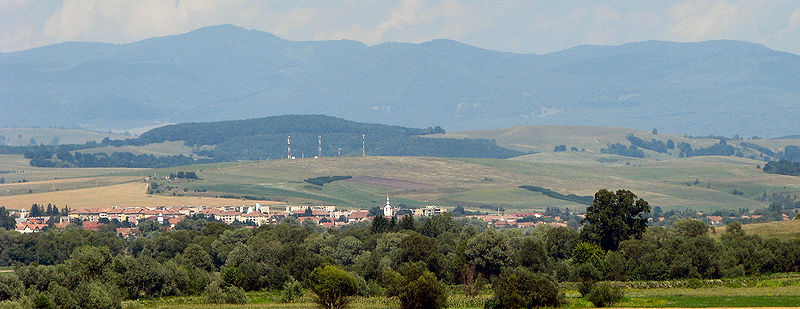
Baraolt town

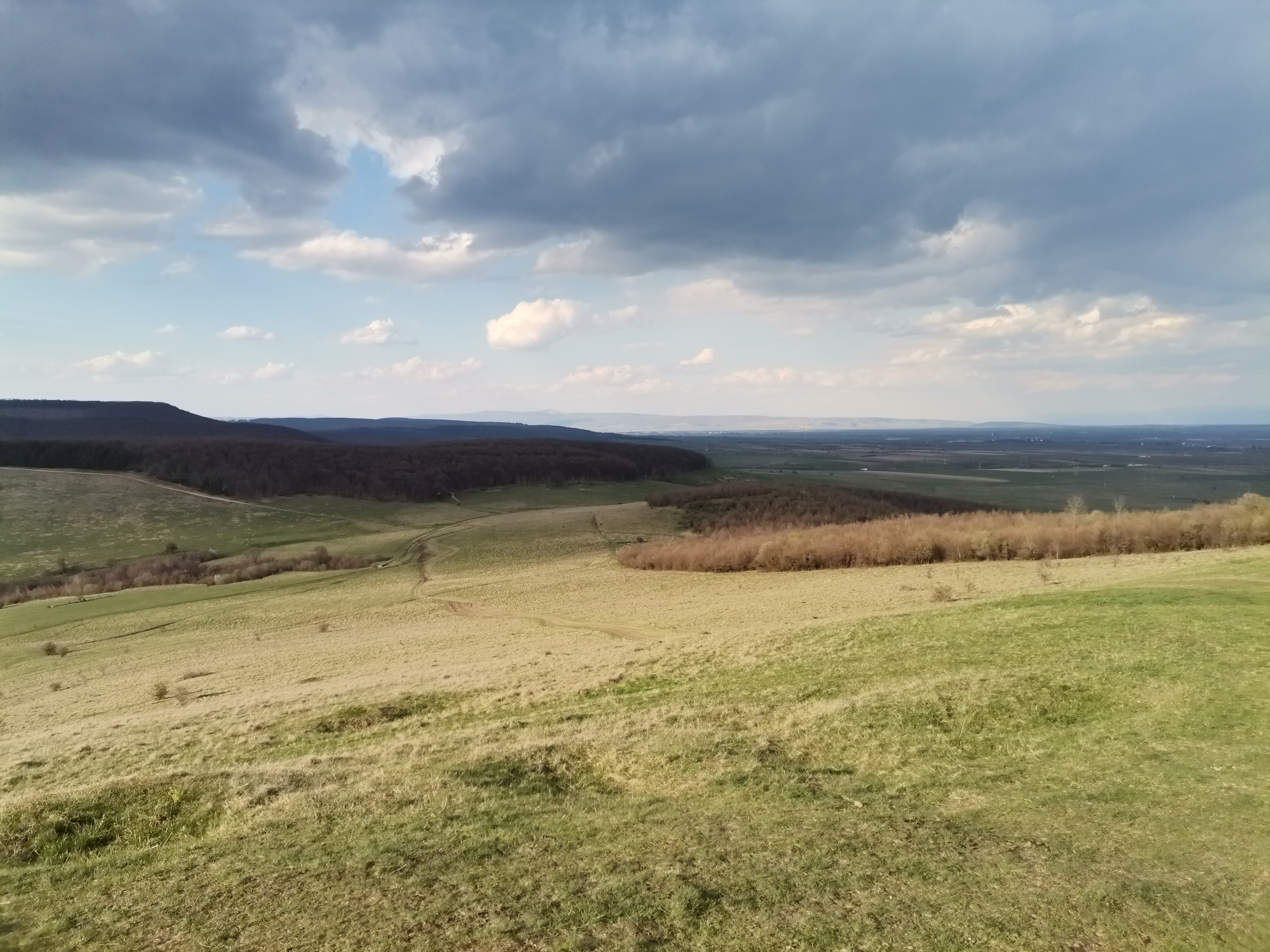
The Baraolt Mountains

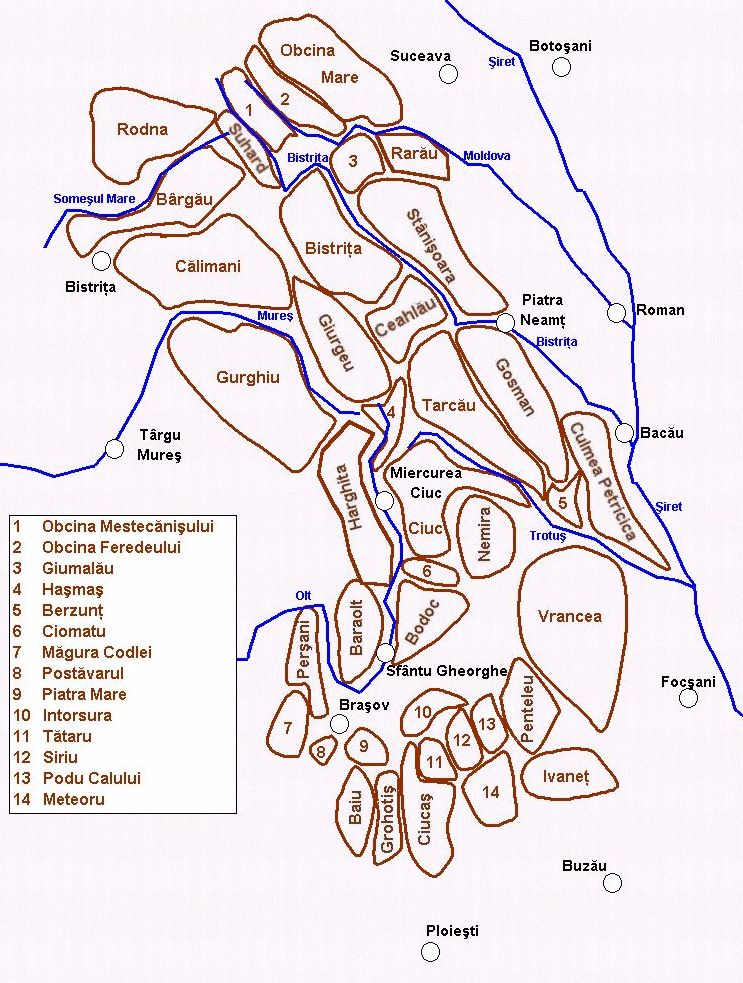
Map of the Eastern Carpathians, with the Baraolt Mountains towards the south

The Baraolt Mountains (Romanian: Munții Baraolt) is a mountain range, entirely in Covasna County of Romania.

Geologically the Baraolts are part of the Inner Eastern Carpathians. By traditional Romanian categorization it's included in the Curvature Carpathians.

The largest city in the area is Sfântu Gheorghe, along with the town of Baraolt. The highest peak is Vârful Havad at 1,019 metres (3,343 feet). The Baraolt Mountains is a popular hiking area.
