= Baraolt =

Baraolt Barót
- Town
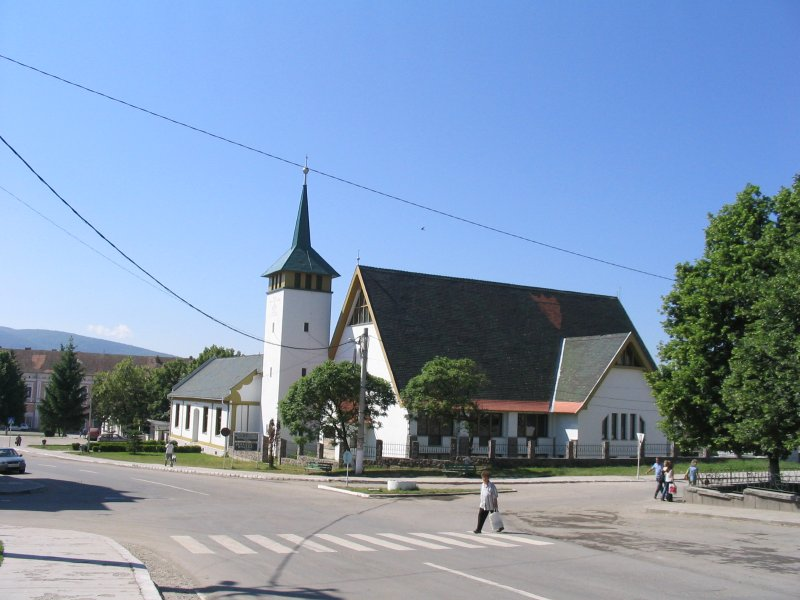

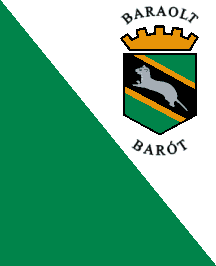
- Flag

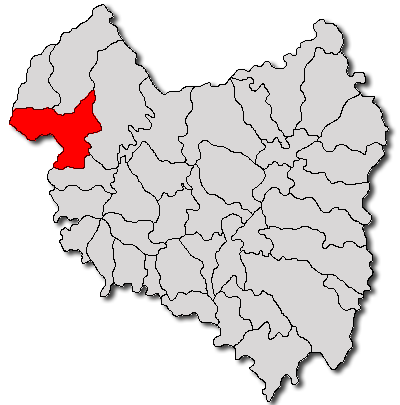
- Location in Covasna County

- Location in Romania
- Coordinates: 46°4′30″N 25°36′0″E
- Country: Romania
- County: Covasna

Government
  - Mayor (2024–2028): János Benedek-Huszár (UDMR)
- Area: 128.48 km^{2} (49.61 sq mi)
- Elevation: 482 m (1,581 ft)
- Population (2021-12-01): 7,730
  - Density: 60.2/km^{2} (156/sq mi)
- Time zone: UTC+02:00 (EET)
  - Summer (DST): UTC+03:00 (EEST)
- Postal code: 525100
- Area code: (+40) 02 67
- Vehicle reg.: CV
- Website: primariabaraolt.ro

Baraolt (Romanian pronunciation: [baraˈolt]; Hungarian: Barót, pronounced [ˈbɒroːt]) is a town and administrative district in Covasna County, Romania. It lies in the Székely Land, an ethno-cultural region in eastern Transylvania. The town was mentioned for the first time as a settlement in 1224. It administers five villages: Biborțeni (Bibarcfalva), Bodoș (Bodos), Căpeni (Köpec), Micloșoara (Miklósvár), and Racoșul de Sus (Felsőrákos).

== Geography ==
The town is located in the northwestern part of Covasna County, 44 km (27 mi) away from the county seat, Sfântu Gheorghe, on the border with Brașov County. It lies in the Baraolt depression, on the banks of the Baraolt River, surrounded by the Harghita Mountains to the north, the Baraolt Mountains to the east and the Perșani Mountains to the west. The nearest railway station is 6 km (3.7 mi) from it, in Augustin, Brașov.

== Demographics ==
At the 2021 census, Baraolt had a population of 7,730. At the 2011 census, the town had a population of 8,567, of which an absolute Székely Hungarian majority of 8,213 (96%) Hungarians, as well as 237 (3%) Romanians, 100 Roma, and 15 others; approximately 47.9% of the town's inhabitants adhere to the Hungarian Reformed Church, while 29.9% follow Roman Catholicism, 16.8% consider themselves Unitarians, and 2.6% are Romanian Orthodox. At the 2002 census, there were 9,670 inhabitants, of which 9,271 (95.87%) were Székely Hungarians, 300 (3.1%) Romanians, 84 Roma, and 15 others.

The town has one high school and a provincial hospital with 82 beds. The hospital's specialties include internal medicine, surgery, obstetrics & gynecology, and paediatrics; it also has an accident and emergency service.

Demographic movement according to the censuses:

== Natives ==
- Dávid Baróti Szabó (1739–1819), Hungarian Jesuit priest, poet, writer, and linguist
- Mihály Bodosi (1909–2005), Hungarian athlete
- Eduard Derzsei (1934–2015), Romanian volleyball player
- Líviusz Gyulai (1937–2021), Hungarian graphic artist, printmaker, and illustrator
