= Gengea =

- Location within Romania

Location
- Country: Romania
- Counties: Olt County
- Villages: Belgun, Teiș, Bârza

Physical characteristics
- Mouth: Bârlui
  - location: Upstream of Olari
  - coordinates: 44°18′45″N 24°10′57″E
  - elevation: 111 m (364 ft)
- Length: 11 km (6.8 mi)
- Basin size: 39 km^{2} (15 sq mi)

Basin features
- Progression: Bârlui→ Olteț→ Olt→ Danube→ Black Sea
- River code: VIII.1.173.14.1

The Gengea, is a right tributary of the river Bârlui in Romania. It flows into the Bârlui near Olari. Its length is 11 km (6.8 mi) and its basin size is 39 km^{2} (15 sq mi).
