= Geamărtălui =

Geamărtălui Gemărtălui
- Location within Romania

Location
- Country: Romania
- Counties: Dolj, Olt

Physical characteristics
- Source: Muierii Hill, Dolj County
  - coordinates: 44°43′02″N 23°46′05″E
  - elevation: 320 m (1,050 ft)
- Mouth: Olteț
  - location: Balș, Olt County
  - coordinates: 44°21′33″N 24°06′05″E
  - elevation: 123 m (404 ft)
- Length: 63 km (39 mi)
- Basin size: 421 km^{2} (163 sq mi)

Basin features
- Progression: Olteț→ Olt→ Danube→ Black Sea

The Geamărtălui (also: Gemărtălui) is a right tributary of the river Olteț in Romania. It discharges into the Olteț in the town Balș. The following towns and villages are situated along the river, from source to mouth: Velești, Balota de Sus, Balota de Jos, Bușteni, Gaia, Murgași, Picăturile, Plopșorelu, Tabaci, Vulpeni, Gropșani, Găvănești, Dâmburile, Baldovinești and Balș. Its length is 63 km (39 mi) and its basin size is 421 km^{2} (163 sq mi).

== Tributaries ==
The following rivers are tributaries to the river Geamărtălui (from source to mouth):

- Left: Bejanul, Pârâul Mijlociu, Horezu
- Right: Valea Satului, Valea Gorgota, Ungureni, Bălășița
