= Bârlui =

- Location within Romania

Location
- Country: Romania
- Counties: Olt County

Physical characteristics
- Source
  - coordinates: 44°35′01″N 24°03′41″E
  - elevation: 259 m (850 ft)
- Mouth: Olteț
  - location: Butoi
  - coordinates: 44°17′18″N 24°12′41″E
  - elevation: 105 m (344 ft)
- Length: 43 km (27 mi)
- Basin size: 137 km^{2} (53 sq mi)

Basin features
- Progression: Olteț→ Olt→ Danube→ Black Sea
- Tributaries
  - right: Gengea

The Bârlui is a left tributary of the river Olteț in Romania. It discharges into the Olteț in Butoi. It passes through the villages Poiana Mare, Morunești, Bărăști, Bechet, Braneț, Olari and Butoi. Its length is 43 km (27 mi) and its basin size is 137 km^{2} (53 sq mi).
