= Horezu (Geamărtălui) =

- Location within Romania

Location
- Country: Romania
- Counties: Vâlcea, Dolj, Olt

Physical characteristics
- Source: Olivoaia Hill
  - coordinates: 44°42′09″N 23°48′01″E
  - elevation: 321 m (1,053 ft)
- Mouth: Geamărtălui
  - location: Broșteni
  - coordinates: 44°25′53″N 23°58′52″E
  - elevation: 142 m (466 ft)

Basin features
- Progression: Geamărtălui→ Olteț→ Olt→ Danube→ Black Sea
- Tributaries
  - left: Valea Prădătorului, Răchita, Dobreț

The Horezu is a left tributary of the river Geamărtălui in Romania. It discharges into the Geamărtălui in Broșteni. The following towns and villages are situated along the river, from source to mouth: Poienile, Înfrățirea, Săliște, Prejoi, Seculești, Gura Racului, Bulzești, Dobrețu, Horezu, Mardale and Broșteni. Its length is 37 km (23 mi) and its basin size is 136 km^{2} (53 sq mi).
