= Beica (Olt) =

- Location within Romania

Location
- Country: Romania
- Counties: Vâlcea County, Olt County
- Villages: Mădulari, Ușurei, Șușani, Cârlogani, Pleșoiu

Physical characteristics
- Source: Mădulari, Vâlcea County
- Mouth: Olt through Oporelu Canal
  - coordinates: 44.4481°N 24.3062°E
- Length: 50 km (31 mi)
- Basin size: 186 km^{2} (72 sq mi)

Basin features
- Progression: Oporelu Canal→ Olt→ Danube→ Black Sea
- Tributaries
  - left: Bălșoara, Gârla Mare
  - right: Băișoara

The Beica is a tributary of the river Olt in Romania. It joins the Olt through the Oporelu Canal, into which it flows near Arcești-Cot. Its length is 50 km (31 mi) and its basin size is 186 km^{2} (72 sq mi).
