= Valea Satului (Geamărtălui) =

- Location within Romania

Location
- Country: Romania
- Counties: Dolj County, Olt County
- Villages: Călinești, Gogoșești, Valea Satului, Cotorbești

Physical characteristics
- Source: Dolj County
  - coordinates: 44°28′24″N 23°50′37″E
  - elevation: 220 m (720 ft)
- Mouth: Geamărtălui
  - location: Vulpeni
  - coordinates: 44°27′31″N 23°55′32″E
  - elevation: 156 m (512 ft)
- Length: 9 km (5.6 mi)
- Basin size: 16 km^{2} (6.2 sq mi)

Basin features
- Progression: Geamărtălui→ Olteț→ Olt→ Danube→ Black Sea

The Valea Satului is a right tributary of the river Geamărtălui in Romania. It flows into the Geamărtălui in Vulpeni. Its length is 9 km (5.6 mi) and its basin size is 16 km^{2} (6.2 sq mi).
