= Dâlga =

- Location within Romania

Location
- Country: Romania
- Counties: Olt County
- Villages: Grădinari

Physical characteristics
- Mouth: Oporelu Canal
  - coordinates: 44.5154°N 24.2928°E
- Length: 27 km (17 mi)
- Basin size: 84 km^{2} (32 sq mi)

Basin features
- Progression: Oporelu Canal→ Olt→ Danube→ Black Sea
- Tributaries
  - left: Putreda
  - right: Băzăvan
- River code: VIII.1.165a.1

The Dâlga is a tributary of the river Olt in Romania. It joins the Olt through the Oporelu Canal, into which it flows near Mamura. Its length is 27 km (17 mi) and its basin size is 84 km^{2} (32 sq mi).
