= Mamu =

Mamu may refer to:

== People ==
- Mamu people, an Indigenous Australian people
- Mamu Ram Gonder (Daunkal) (died 2020), Indian politician
- Petro Mamu (born 1984), Eritrean mountain runner
- Sandro Mamukelashvili or Mamu (born 1999), American-born Georgian basketball player

== Places ==
- Mamu, Queensland, a locality in Australia
- Mamu, Iran (disambiguation), several villages
- Mamu (river), Romania
- Mamu, a village in Mădulari, Romania
- Mamu gas field, a gas field in Romania
- Mamu, Kra Buri, a tambon in Kra Buri District, Thailand

== Other uses ==
- Mamu language, a dialect of Dyirbal spoken in Queensland, Australia
- Mamu (deity), a Mesopotamian deity of dreams
- Mamu (Nintendo) or Wart, a fictional character
- Macaca mulatta, also known as Rhesus monkey, sometimes abbreviated Mamu or MAMU in biological research
- Miguel Urrutia Art Museum, Museo de Arte Miguel Urrutia (MAMU for its acronym in Spanish)
