= Barza =

Barza may refer to several villages in Romania:

- Barza, a village in the commune of Dănești, Gorj
- Barza, a village in Crișcior Commune, Hunedoara County
- Barza, a village in Tufeni Commune, Olt County
- Barza, a village in the commune of Budești, Vâlcea

Other

- Bârza, a commune in Olt County
- Barza, the Hungarian name for Bârsa Commune, Arad County
