= Miloveanu =

- Location within Romania

Location
- Country: Romania
- Counties: Olt County
- Villages: Coteana, Bălănești

Physical characteristics
- Mouth: Iminog
  - coordinates: 44.2483°N 24.4915°E

Basin features
- Progression: Iminog→ Olt→ Danube→ Black Sea
- Tributaries
  - right: Ciocârlia
- River code: VIII.1.174.2

The Miloveanu is a right tributary of the river Iminog in Romania. It flows into the Iminog in Bălănești. Its length is 14 km (8.7 mi) and its basin size is 56 km^{2} (22 sq mi).
