= Adâncata =

Adâncata may refer to:

- Adâncata, Ialomița, a commune in Ialomiţa County, Romania
- Adâncata, Suceava, a commune in Suceava County, Romania
- Adâncata, a village in Goiești Commune, Dolj County, Romania
- Adâncata, the Romanian name for Hlyboka, Ukraine

== See also ==
- Adâncata River
