= Bălășița =

- Location within Romania

Location
- Country: Romania
- Counties: Dolj, Olt
- Villages: Câmpeni

Physical characteristics
- Source: Dolj County
  - coordinates: 44°22′35″N 24°00′17″E
  - elevation: 181 m (594 ft)
- Mouth: Geamărtălui
  - location: Balș, Olt County
  - coordinates: 44°21′39″N 24°05′48″E
  - elevation: 124 m (407 ft)
- Length: 9 km (5.6 mi)
- Basin size: 23 km^{2} (8.9 sq mi)

Basin features
- Progression: Geamărtălui→ Olteț→ Olt→ Danube→ Black Sea

The Bălășița is a right tributary of the river Geamărtălui in Romania. It discharges into the Geamărtălui in the town Balș. Its length is 9 km (5.6 mi) and its basin size is 23 km^{2} (8.9 sq mi).
