= Horezu (disambiguation) =

Horezu may refer to the following places in Romania:

- Horezu, a town in Vâlcea County
- Horezu, a village in the commune Turcinești, Gorj County
- Horezu, a village in the commune Dobrețu, Olt County
- Horezu (Bistricioara), tributary of the Bistricioara in Vâlcea County
- Horezu (Geamărtălui), tributary of the Geamărtălui in Vâlcea, Dolj and Olt Counties
