= Ungureni (river) =

- Location within Romania

Location
- Country: Romania
- Counties: Dolj County, Olt County
- Villages: Ungurenii Mici, Ungureni, Băleasa

Physical characteristics
- Source: Dolj County
  - coordinates: 44°25′52″N 23°52′54″E
  - elevation: 215 m (705 ft)
- Mouth: Geamărtălui
  - coordinates: 44°24′06″N 24°02′06″E
  - elevation: 134 m (440 ft)
- Length: 13 km (8.1 mi)
- Basin size: 34 km^{2} (13 sq mi)

Basin features
- Progression: Geamărtălui→ Olteț→ Olt→ Danube→ Black Sea
- Tributaries
  - left: Gomușa

The Ungureni is a right tributary of the river Geamărtălui in Romania. It flows into the Geamărtălui near Băleasa. Its length is 13 km (8.1 mi) and its basin size is 34 km^{2} (13 sq mi).
