= Mamu (river) =

- Location within Romania

Location
- Country: Romania
- Counties: Vâlcea, Olt
- Villages: Fumureni, Lungești, Strejești

Physical characteristics
- Mouth: Olt through Oporelu Canal
  - coordinates: 44.5077°N 24.2912°E
- Length: 35 km (22 mi)
- Basin size: 107 km^{2} (41 sq mi)

Basin features
- Progression: Oporelu Canal→ Olt→ Danube→ Black Sea
- Tributaries
  - left: Silea
  - right: Cernișor

The Mamu is a tributary of the river Olt in Romania. It joins the Olt through the Oporelu Canal, into which it flows in Colibași. Its length is 35 km (22 mi) and its basin size is 107 km^{2} (41 sq mi).
