= Dacian fortress of Mărgăritești =

- Location within Romania
- 44.2998°N 24.1221°E
- Location: La cetate, Mărgăritești, Olt, Romania

Site notes
- Condition: Ruined

Monument istoric
- Reference no.: OT-I-s-B-08517

It was a Dacian fortified town.
