= Iminog =

- Location within Romania

Location
- Country: Romania
- Counties: Olt County
- Villages: Bălteni, Perieți, Schitu, Vâlcele, Izvoarele, Mărunței

Physical characteristics
- Mouth: Olt
  - location: Mărunței
  - coordinates: 44.2047°N 24.4574°E
- Length: 50 km (31 mi)
- Basin size: 220 km^{2} (85 sq mi)

Basin features
- Progression: Olt→ Danube→ Black Sea
- Tributaries
  - left: Adâncata
  - right: Valea Hotarului, Cleja, Miloveanu

The Iminog is a left tributary of the river Olt in Romania. It discharges into the Olt in Mărunței. Its length is 50 km (31 mi) and its basin size is 220 km^{2} (85 sq mi).
