= Adrian-Ionuț Chesnoiu =

Romanian politician (born 1982)

Minister of Agriculture and Rural Development
- In office 25 November 2021 – 23 June 2022
- Preceded by: Nechita-Adrian Oros
- Succeeded by: Sorin Grindeanu (Acting)

Member of the Romanian Chamber of Deputies
- In office 21 December 2020 – 23 June 2022
- Constituency: Olt County

Personal details
- Born: 12 May 1982 (age 42); Coteana, Olt, Romania
- Political party: Social Democratic Party (PSD) (until 2022)

Adrian-Ionuț Chesnoiu (born 12 May 1982, Coteana, Olt, Romania) is a Romanian former deputy, elected in 2020 from Social Democratic Party (PSD). On 25 November 2021 he became the Minister of Agriculture and Rural Development in the government of Nicolae Ciucă. However, he resigned from this office, as well as from his PSD and Parliament positions on 23 June 2022 after the National Anticorruption Directorate accused him of abuse of office and requested that his judicial immunity be lifted so that it can prosecute him.
