= Constantin Dumitrescu =

Constantin Dumitrescu may refer to several Romanian people:

- Constantin Dumitrescu (boxer)
- Constantin Dumitrescu (general)
- Constantin Ticu Dumitrescu
