= Baldovinești =

- Commune
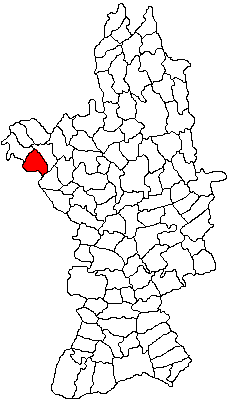
- Location in Olt County

- Location in Romania
- Coordinates: 44°23′N 24°3′E
- Country: Romania
- County: Olt

Government
  - Mayor (2020–2024): Ion Enescu (PSD)
- Area: 21.49 km^{2} (8.30 sq mi)
- Elevation: 157 m (515 ft)
- Population (2021-12-01): 922
  - Density: 43/km^{2} (110/sq mi)
- Time zone: EET/EEST (UTC+2/+3)
- Postal code: 237005
- Area code: +(40) x49
- Vehicle reg.: OT
- Website: baldovinesti.ro

Baldovinești is a commune in Olt County, Oltenia, Romania. It is composed of three villages: Baldovinești, Gubandru, and Pietriș. It included four other villages until 2004, when they were split off to form Găvănești Commune.

The commune is situated in the Wallachian Plain, at an altitude of 157 m (515 ft), on the banks of the river Geamărtălui. It is located in the northwestern part of Olt County, 6 km (3.7 mi) from the town of Balș and 32 km (20 mi) west of the county seat, Slatina. Baldovinești is on the border with Dolj County; the city of Craiova is 25 km (16 mi) to the southwest.
