= Perieți =

Perieți may refer to several places in Romania:

- Perieți, Ialomița, a commune in Ialomița County
- Perieți, Olt, a commune in Olt County
