= Pârâul Mijlociu =

Pârâul Mijlociu may refer to the following rivers in Romania:

- Pârâul Mijlociu (Geamărtălui), a tributary of the Geamărtălui in Dolj County
- Pârâul Mijlociu, a tributary of the Tih in Mureș County
