= Mamu, Iran =

Mamu (Persian: مموئ or مامو) in Iran may refer to:

- Mamu, Fars (مموئ - Mamū’)
- Mamu, Lorestan (مامو - Māmū)
