= Dâmburile =

Dâmburile may refer to several places in Romania:

- Dâmburile, a village in Suatu Commune, Cluj County
- Dâmburile, a village in Găvănești Commune, Olt County
