= Ciocârlia =

Ciocârlia, (meaning "skylark"), in the past sometimes spelled ciocîrlia, may refer to:

- Ciocârlia (lăutăresc tune), a Romanian traditional tune
- Fanfare Ciocărlia, a Romani (Gypsy) brass band from Romania
- Ciocârlia (film), a 2002 Romanian TV film
- Ciocârlia (ensemble), a Romanian folk music and dance ensemble that belonged to the Ministry of the Interior

== Places ==
- Ciocârlia, Constanța, a commune in Constanța County
- Ciocârlia, Ialomița, a commune in Ialomița County
- Ciocârlia, a tributary of the Miloveanu in Olt County, Romania
- Ciocârlia, a tributary of the Șușița in Vrancea County, Romania

== People ==
- Dana Ciocarlie (born 1968), French pianist and teacher of music of Romanian origin
