= Cleja River =

Cleja River may refer to:

- Cleja, a tributary of the Iminog in Olt County
- Cleja River (Siret)

== See also ==
- Cleja, a commune in Bacău County, Romania
- Clejani, a commune in Giurgiu County, Romania
