= Oporelu Canal =

- Native name: Canalul Oporelu (Romanian)

Location
- Country: Romania
- Counties: Olt County

Physical characteristics
- Mouth: Olt
  - location: Downstream of Arcești Dam
  - coordinates: 44.2626°N 24.3947°E
- Length: 25 km (16 mi)
- Basin size: 396 km^{2} (153 sq mi)

Basin features
- Progression: Olt→ Danube→ Black Sea
- Tributaries
  - right: Dâlga, Mamu, Beica

The Oporelu Canal (Romanian: Canalul Oporelu) is an artificial canal built along the right bank dyke of the Arcești Lake on the river Olt in Romania. Its role is to intercept the right bank tributaries of the Olt river and to convey them downstream of the Arcești Dam. The Oporelu canal is registered as an artificial river in Romania's official registry of rivers. Its length is 25 km (16 mi) and its basin size is 396 km^{2} (153 sq mi).
