= Vădastra =

- Commune
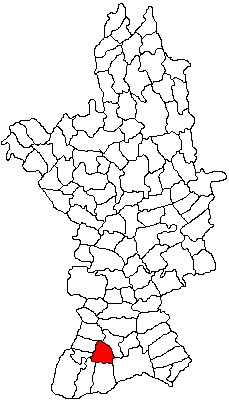
- Location in Olt County

- Location in Romania
- Coordinates: 43°52′N 24°22′E
- Country: Romania
- County: Olt
- Area: 18.04 km^{2} (6.97 sq mi)
- Population (2021-12-01): 1,212
  - Density: 67.18/km^{2} (174.0/sq mi)
- Time zone: UTC+02:00 (EET)
  - Summer (DST): UTC+03:00 (EEST)
- Vehicle reg.: OT

Vădastra is a commune in Olt County, Oltenia, Romania. It is composed of a single village, Vădastra. It also included the village of Vișina Nouă until 2004, when it was split off to form a separate commune.

== History ==
The Late Neolithic to Early Copper Age 'Vădastra culture', dating from c. 5500–4800 BC was named after the village of Vădastra, in the vicinity of which the first remains of this culture were excavated. The Vădastra culture primarily occupied the southern part of the Oltenia region in Romania and extended into parts of northern Bulgaria. It formed part of the wider culture or civilization known today as 'Old Europe'.

=== Gallery ===
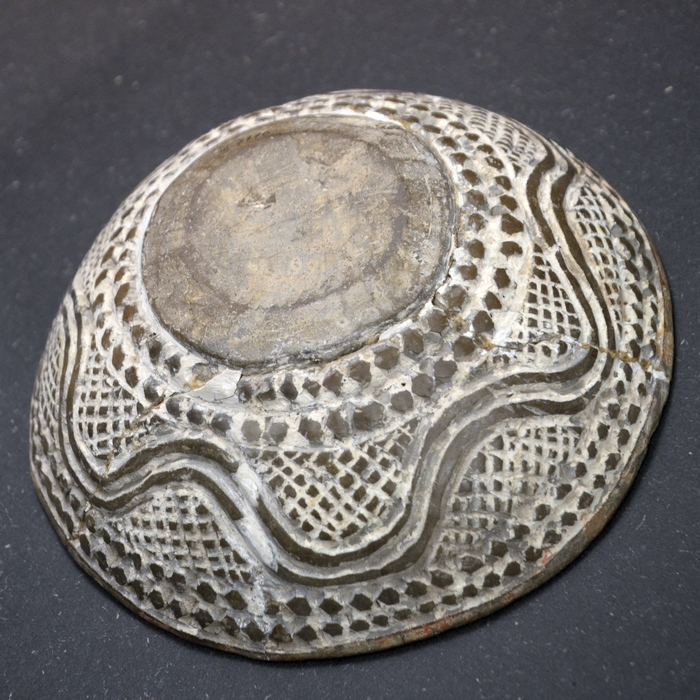
Vădastra culture ceramic bowl, c. 5500-5000 BC

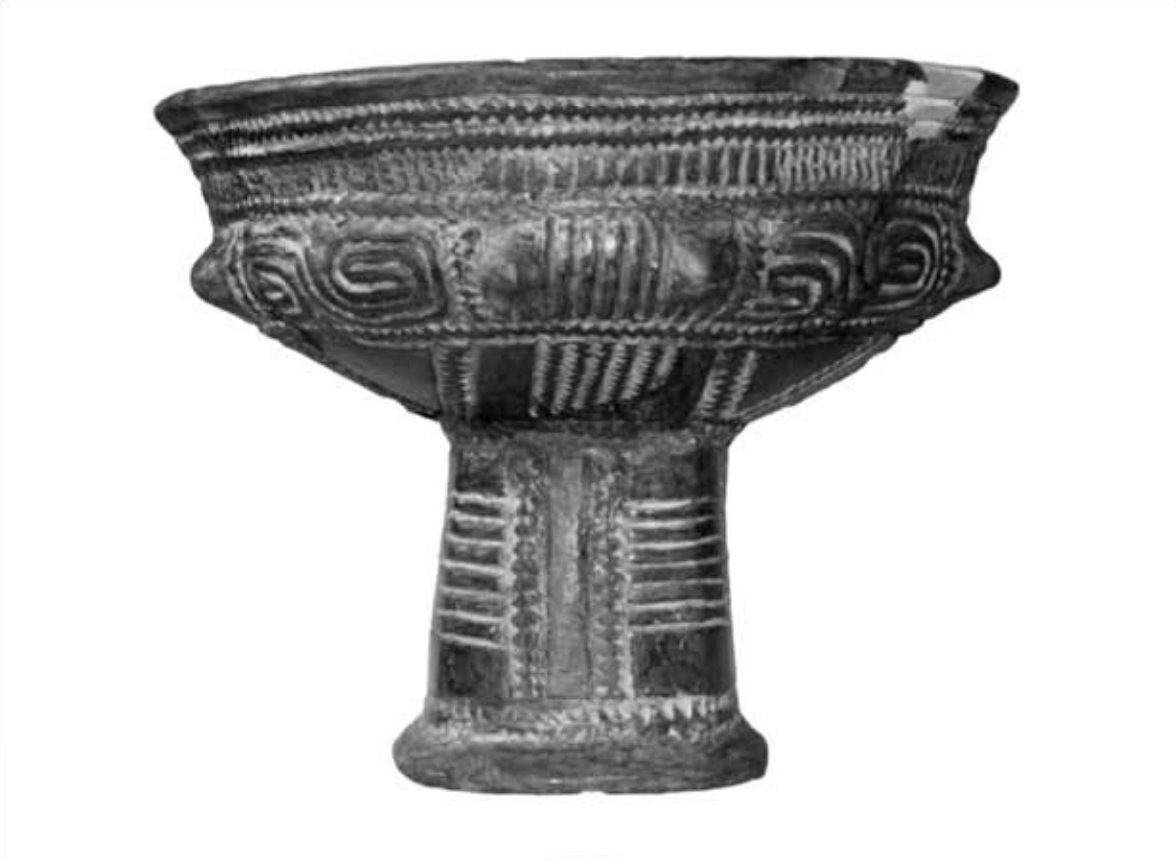
Vădastra culture ceramic pedestalled bowl
