= Vișina Nouă =

- Commune
- Coat of arms

- Location in Romania
- Coordinates: 43°52′N 24°25′E
- Country: Romania
- County: Olt

Government
  - Mayor (2020–2024): Florin Cristian Țol (PSD)
- Area: 30 km^{2} (12 sq mi)
- Population (2021-12-01): 1,512
  - Density: 50/km^{2} (130/sq mi)
- Time zone: UTC+02:00 (EET)
  - Summer (DST): UTC+03:00 (EEST)
- Postal code: 237511
- Vehicle reg.: OT
- Website: www.primariavisinanoua.judetulolt.ro

Vișina Nouă is a commune in Olt County, Oltenia, Romania. It is composed of a single village, Vișina Nouă. This was part of Vădastra Commune until 2004, when it was split off.
