= Pârâul Mijlociu (Geamărtălui) =

- Location within Romania

Location
- Country: Romania
- Counties: Dolj County

Physical characteristics
- Mouth: Geamărtălui
  - location: Gaia
  - coordinates: 44°31′05″N 23°50′26″E
  - elevation: 180 m (590 ft)
- Length: 16 km (9.9 mi)
- Basin size: 26 km^{2} (10 sq mi)

Basin features
- Progression: Geamărtălui→ Olteț→ Olt→ Danube→ Black Sea

The Pârâul Mijlociu is a left tributary of the river Geamărtălui in Romania. It discharges into the Geamărtălui in Gaia. Its length is 16 km (9.9 mi) and its basin size is 26 km^{2} (10 sq mi).
