= Orlea =

- Commune
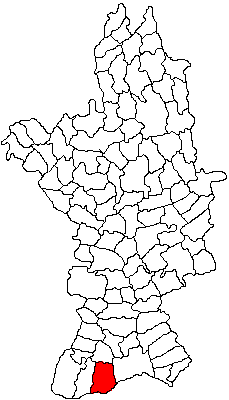
- Location in Olt County

- Location in Romania
- Coordinates: 43°45′N 24°23′E
- Country: Romania
- County: Olt
- Population (2021-12-01): 1,917
- Time zone: EET/EEST (UTC+2/+3)
- Vehicle reg.: OT

Orlea is a commune in Olt County, Oltenia, Romania. It is composed of two villages, Orlea and Orlea Nouă. It also included Gura Padinii and Satu Nou villages until 2004, when they were split off to form Gura Padinii Commune.
