= Văleni, Olt =

Văleni
- Commune
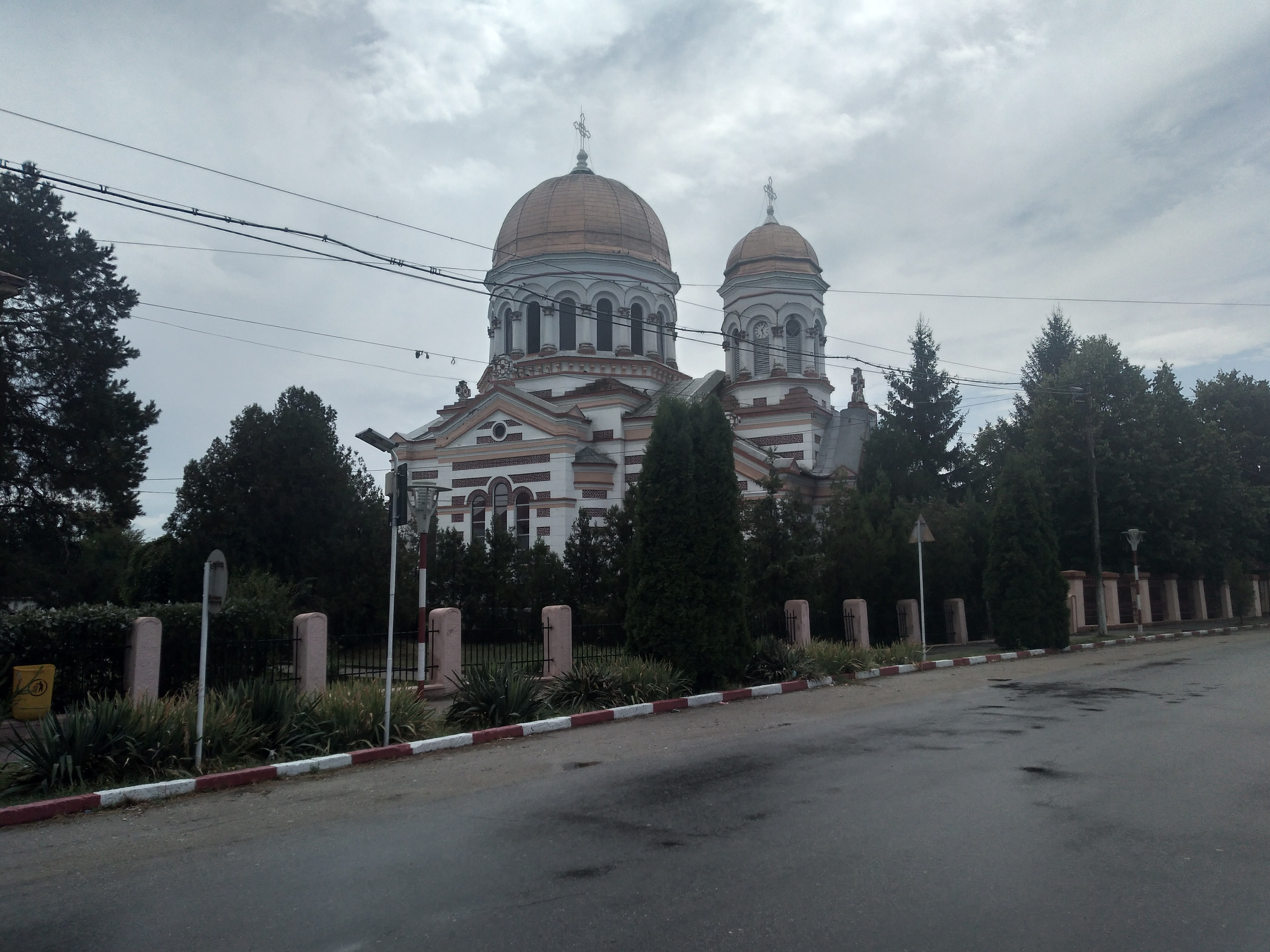
- Orthodox Church in Văleni, Olt County

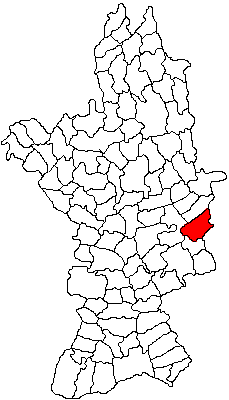
- Location in Olt County

- Location in Romania
- Coordinates: 44°15′N 24°48′E
- Country: Romania
- County: Olt
- Area: 67.23 km^{2} (25.96 sq mi)
- Population (2021-12-01): 2,294
  - Density: 34.12/km^{2} (88.37/sq mi)
- Time zone: UTC+02:00 (EET)
  - Summer (DST): UTC+03:00 (EEST)
- Vehicle reg.: OT

Văleni is a commune in Olt County, Muntenia, Romania. It is composed of four villages: Mandra, Popești, Tirișneag and Văleni.
