= Vasile Drăguț =

Romanian art critic and academic

Vasile Drăguț (January 9, 1928—November 1, 1987) was a Romanian art critic and academic.

Born in Murgași, Dolj County, he graduated from Saint Sava National College in Bucharest. A professor at the Fine Arts Institute in that city, he was also editor-in-chief of Arta magazine. A prominent researcher of Romanian art, particularly from the medieval period, he published some thirty books, along with numerous articles and studies. He was buried at Râmeț Monastery.

== Selected bibliography ==
- Stilurile Greciei Antice (1962)
- Nicolae Dărăscu (1966)
- Sighișoara (1966)
- Vechi monumente hunedorene (1968)
- Arta brâncovenească (1971)
- Arta gotică în România (1979)
- Cetatea Sighișoara (1968)
- Arta românească : preistorie, antichitate, ev mediu, renaștere (1982)
- Fata morgană la Tassili (1983)
- Dicționar enciclopedic de artă medievală românească (1976)
- Medalioane în cerneală (1988)
