= Rotunda, Olt =

Rotunda
- Commune
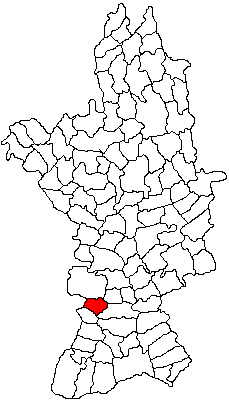
- Location in Olt County

- Location in Romania
- Coordinates: 43°59′N 24°19′E
- Country: Romania
- County: Olt

Government
  - Mayor (2020–2024): Vergil Sârbu (PSD)
- Population (2021-12-01): 2,394
- Time zone: EET/EEST (UTC+2/+3)
- Vehicle reg.: OT

Rotunda is a commune in Olt County, Oltenia, Romania. It is composed of a single village, Rotunda.

The nearest city is Caracal, at a distance of nearly 20 km.
