= Șopârlița =

- Commune
- Location in Romania
- Coordinates: 44°17′N 24°17′E
- Country: Romania
- County: Olt
- Area: 19.20 km^{2} (7.41 sq mi)
- Population (2021-12-01): 1,152
  - Density: 60.00/km^{2} (155.4/sq mi)
- Time zone: UTC+02:00 (EET)
  - Summer (DST): UTC+03:00 (EEST)
- Vehicle reg.: OT

Șopârlița is a commune in Olt County, Oltenia, Romania. It is composed of a single village, Șopârlița, and was established in 2004, when it was split off from Pârșcoveni Commune.
