= Gura Padinii =

- Commune
- Location in Romania
- Coordinates: 43°46′N 24°19′E
- Country: Romania
- County: Olt
- Population (2021-12-01): 1,539
- Time zone: EET/EEST (UTC+2/+3)
- Vehicle reg.: OT

Gura Padinii is a commune in Olt County, Oltenia, Romania. It is composed of two villages, Gura Padinii and Satu Nou. These were part of Orlea Commune until 2004, when they were split off.
