= Șușani =

- Commune
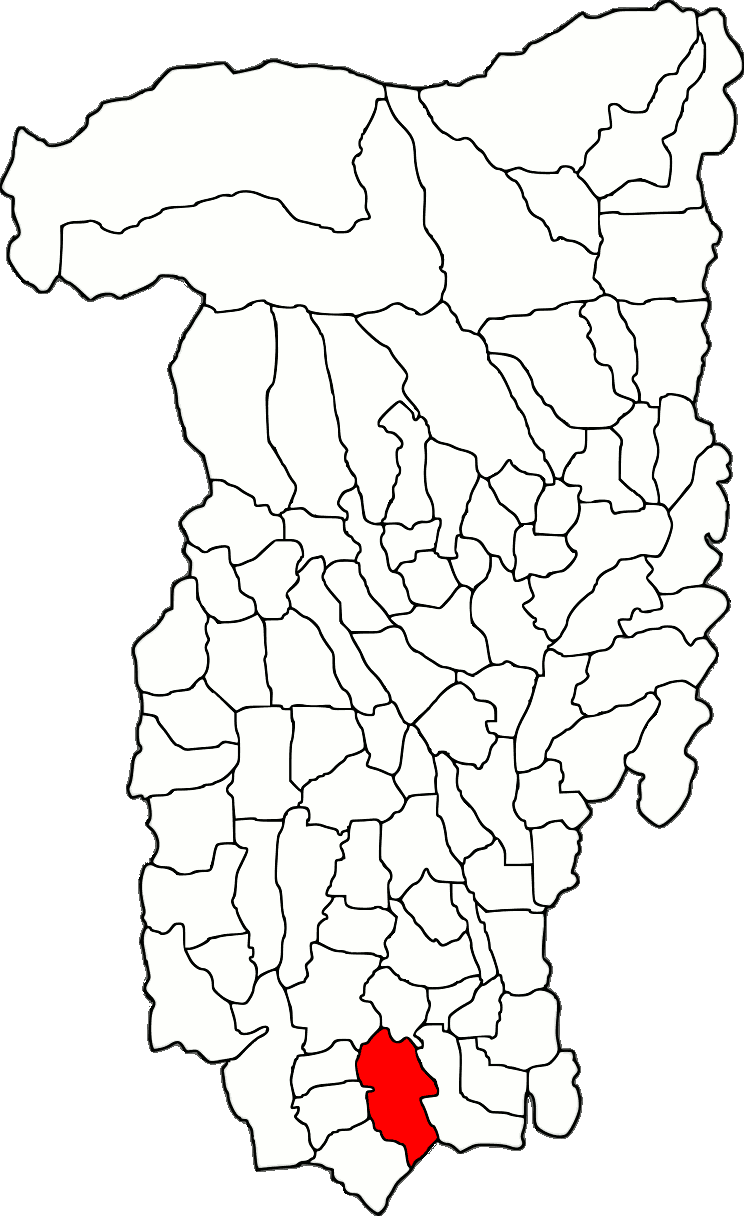
- Location in Vâlcea County

- Location in Romania
- Coordinates: 44°35′N 24°06′E
- Country: Romania
- County: Vâlcea
- Area: 66 km^{2} (25 sq mi)
- Population (2021-12-01): 2,979
  - Density: 45/km^{2} (120/sq mi)
- Time zone: UTC+02:00 (EET)
  - Summer (DST): UTC+03:00 (EEST)
- Vehicle reg.: VL

Șușani is a commune located in Vâlcea County, Oltenia, Romania. It is composed of five villages: Râmești, Sârbi, Stoiculești, Șușani and Ușurei.

== Natives ==
- Adela Popescu
