= Lungești =

- Commune
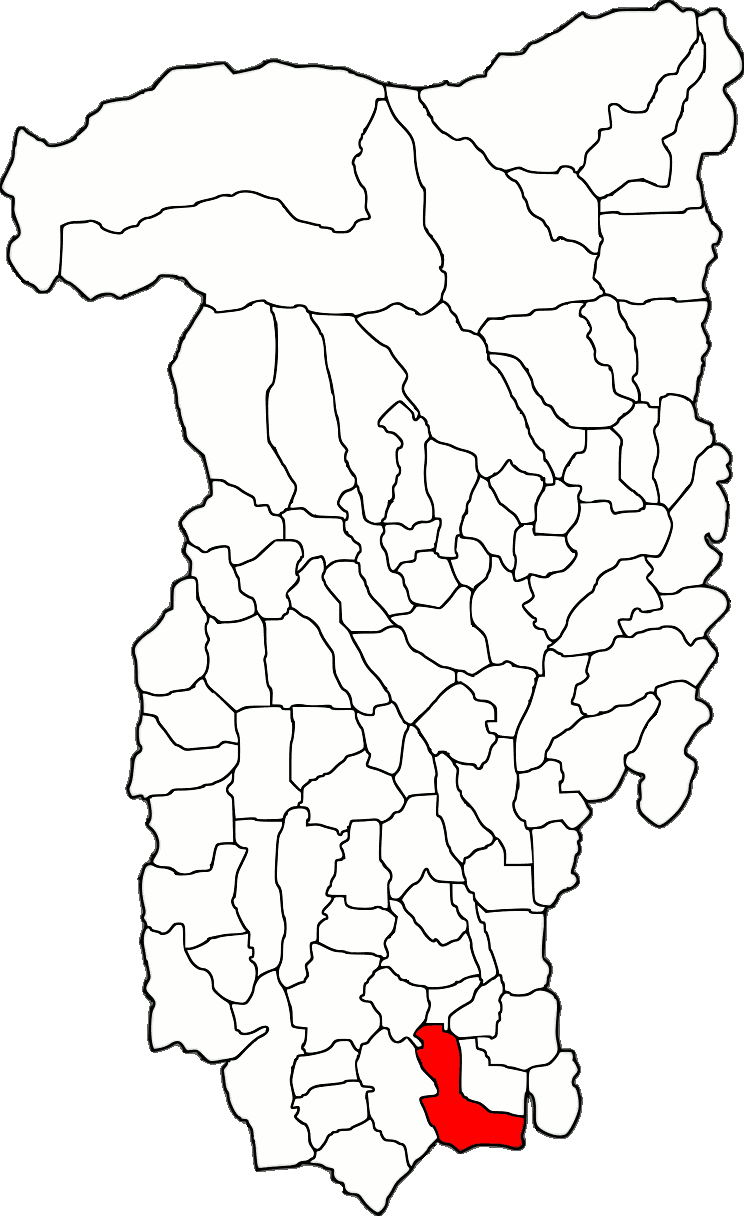
- Location in Vâlcea County

- Location in Romania
- Coordinates: 44°34′N 24°11′E
- Country: Romania
- County: Vâlcea
- Area: 59.58 km^{2} (23.00 sq mi)
- Population (2021-12-01): 3,149
  - Density: 52.85/km^{2} (136.9/sq mi)
- Time zone: UTC+02:00 (EET)
  - Summer (DST): UTC+03:00 (EEST)
- Vehicle reg.: VL

Lungești is a commune located in Vâlcea County, Oltenia, Romania. It is composed of six villages: Carcadiești, Dumbrava, Fumureni, Gănţulei, Lungești and Stănești-Lunca.
