= Bulzești =

- Commune
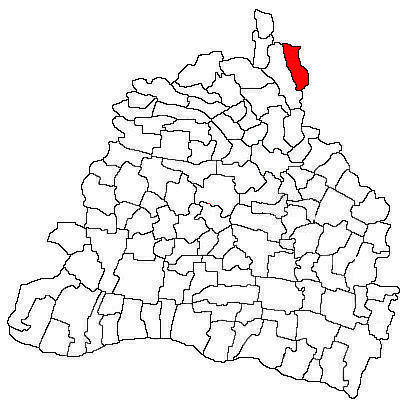
- Location in Dolj County

- Location in Romania
- Coordinates: 44°32′N 23°53′E
- Country: Romania
- County: Dolj
- Area: 63.56 km^{2} (24.54 sq mi)
- Population (2021-12-01): 1,269
  - Density: 19.97/km^{2} (51.71/sq mi)
- Time zone: UTC+02:00 (EET)
  - Summer (DST): UTC+03:00 (EEST)
- Vehicle reg.: DJ

Bulzești is a commune in Dolj County, Oltenia, Romania. It is composed of ten villages: Bulzești, Frățila, Gura Racului, Înfrățirea, Piscu Lung, Poienile, Prejoi, Săliște, Seculești, and Stoicești.

== Natives ==
- Marin Sorescu (1936 – 1996), Romanian poet, playwright, and novelist
