= Mamu, Fars =

Mamu مموئ
- Village
- Location within Iran
- Coordinates: 30°07′22″N 52°17′43″E
- Country: Iran
- Province: Fars
- County: Sepidan
- Bakhsh: Beyza
- Rural District: Banesh

Population (2006)
  - Total: 390
- Time zone: UTC+3:30 (IRST)
  - Summer (DST): UTC+4:30 (IRDT)

Mamu (Persian: مموئ, also Romanized as Mamū' and Mamū; also known as Mamū Soflá, Mamū-ye Pā’īn, and Mamū-ye Soflá) is a village in Banesh Rural District, Beyza District, Sepidan County, Fars province, Iran. As of the 2006 census, its population was 390, in 86 families.
