= Mamu, Lorestan =

Mamu مامو
- Village
- Location within Iran
- Coordinates: 34°11′50″N 47°37′35″E
- Country: Iran
- Province: Lorestan
- County: Delfan
- Bakhsh: Kakavand
- Rural District: Kakavand-e Gharbi

Population (2006)
  - Total: 72
- Time zone: UTC+3:30 (IRST)
  - Summer (DST): UTC+4:30 (IRDT)

Mamu (Persian: مامو, also Romanized as Māmū; also known as Māmū-ye Bālā and Māmū-ye ‘Olyā) is a village in Kakavand-e Gharbi Rural District, Kakavand District, Delfan County, Lorestan Province, Iran. At the 2006 census, its population was 72, in 10 families.
