= Mischii =

- Commune
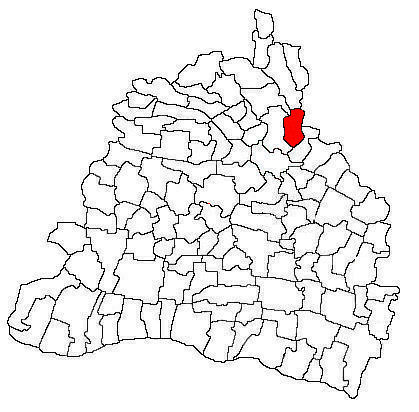
- Location in Dolj County

- Location in Romania
- Coordinates: 44°23′N 23°51′E
- Country: Romania
- County: Dolj

Government
  - Mayor (2020–2024): Gheorghe Popa (PNL)
- Area: 49.93 km^{2} (19.28 sq mi)
- Elevation: 200 m (700 ft)
- Highest elevation: 225 m (738 ft)
- Lowest elevation: 175 m (574 ft)
- Population (2021-12-01): 1,782
  - Density: 36/km^{2} (92/sq mi)
- Time zone: EET/EEST (UTC+2/+3)
- Postal code: 207405
- Area code: +(40) 251
- Vehicle reg.: DJ
- Website: www.primariamischii.judetuldolj.ro

Mischii is a commune in Dolj County, Oltenia, Romania with a population of 1,782 people as of 2021. It is composed of six villages: Călinești, Gogoșești, Mischii, Mlecănești, Motoci, and Urechești.

Historical population
| Year | Pop. | ±% |
|---|---|---|
| 2002 | 1,862 | — |
| 2011 | 1,760 | −5.5% |
| 2021 | 1,782 | +1.2% |
Source: Census data
