= Adâncata, Suceava =

Adâncata
- Commune
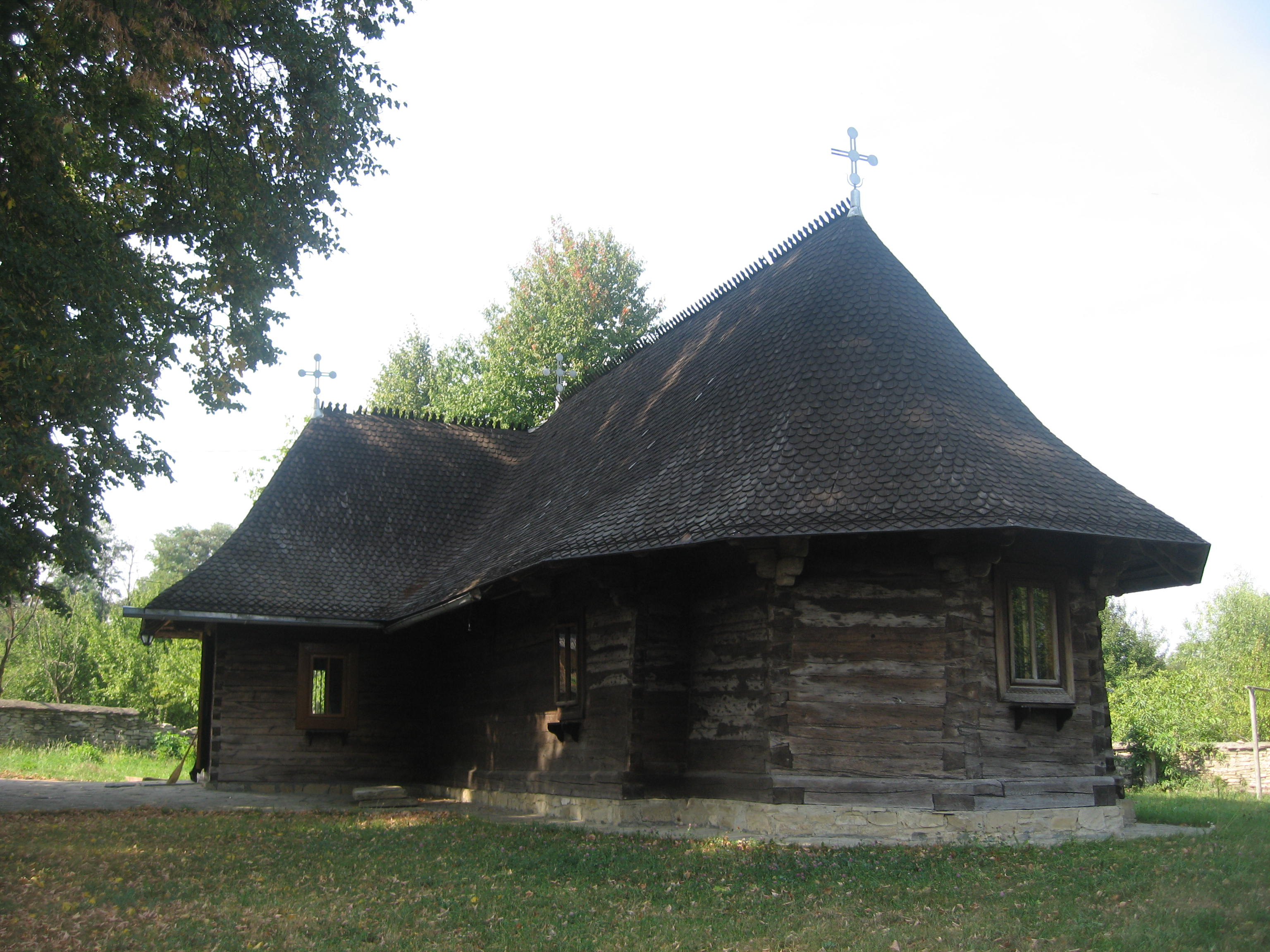
- The wooden Orthodox church in Adâncata (2009)

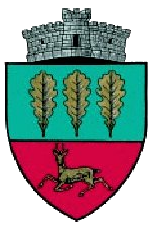
- Coat of arms

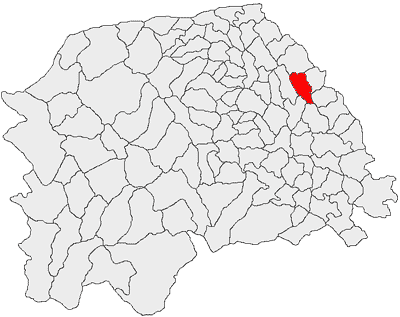
- Location in Suceava County

- Location in Romania
- Coordinates: 47°45′N 26°18′E
- Country: Romania
- County: Suceava

Government
  - Mayor (2020–2024): Viorel Cucu (PNL)
- Area: 38.57 km^{2} (14.89 sq mi)
- Elevation: 354 m (1,161 ft)
- Population (2021-12-01): 4,031
  - Density: 104.5/km^{2} (270.7/sq mi)
- Time zone: UTC+02:00 (EET)
  - Summer (DST): UTC+03:00 (EEST)
- Postal code: 727005
- Area code: +40 230
- Vehicle reg.: SV
- Website: comuna-adancata.ro

Adâncata is a commune located in Suceava County, Western Moldavia, northeastern Romania. It is composed of three villages, namely: Adâncata, Călugăreni, and Fetești.

Historical population
Year	Pop.	±%
2002	4,079	—
2011	4,032	−1.2%
2021	4,031	−0.0%
Source: Census data

At the 2021 census, the commune had a population of 4,031, of which 90.3% were Romanians.

== Administration and local politics ==
=== Communal council ===
The commune's current local council has the following political composition, according to the results of the 2020 Romanian local elections:

Party	Seats	Current Council
National Liberal Party (PNL)	11	
Social Democratic Party (PSD)	2	

== Gallery ==
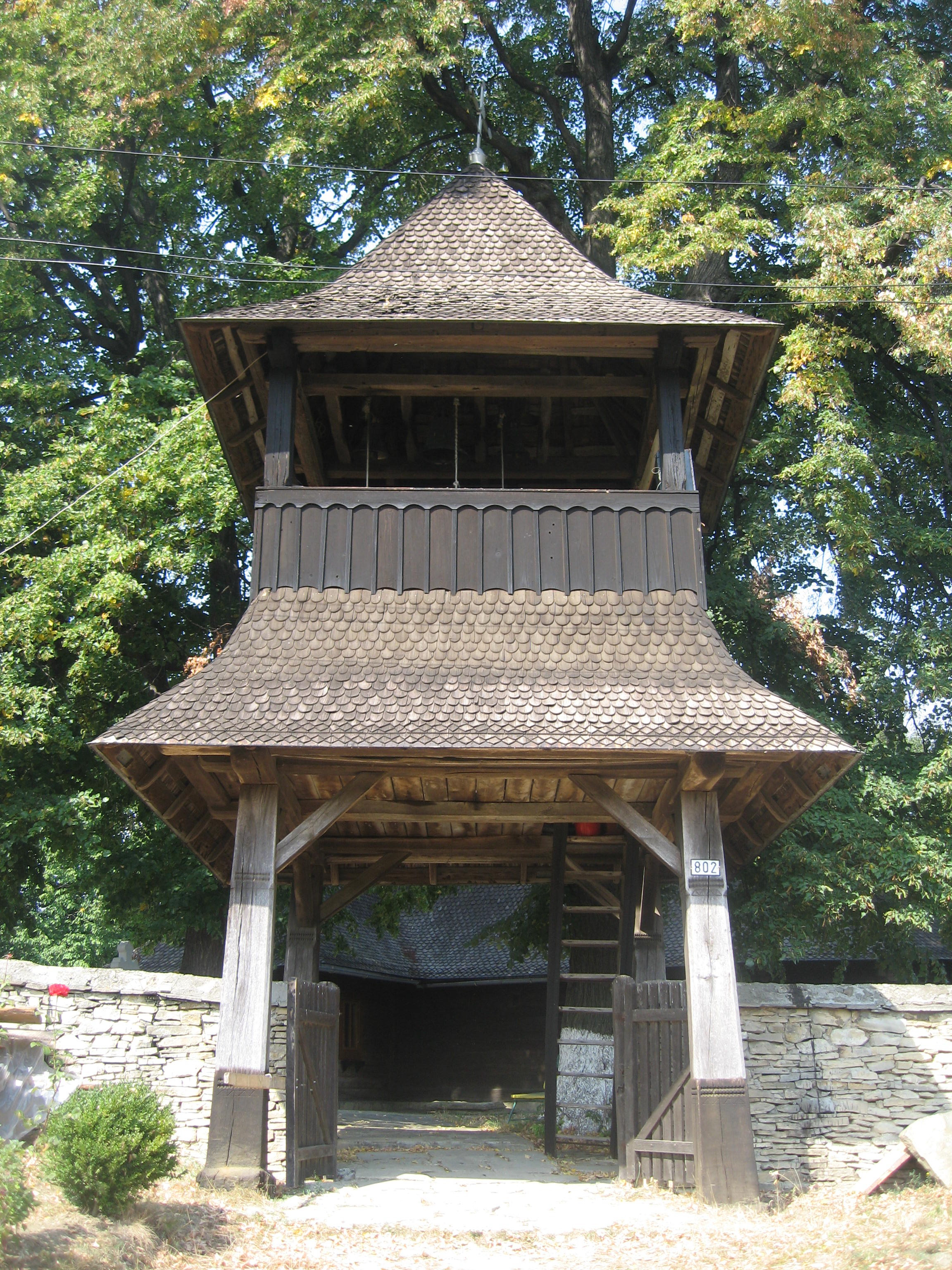
The wooden church in Adâncata (2009)

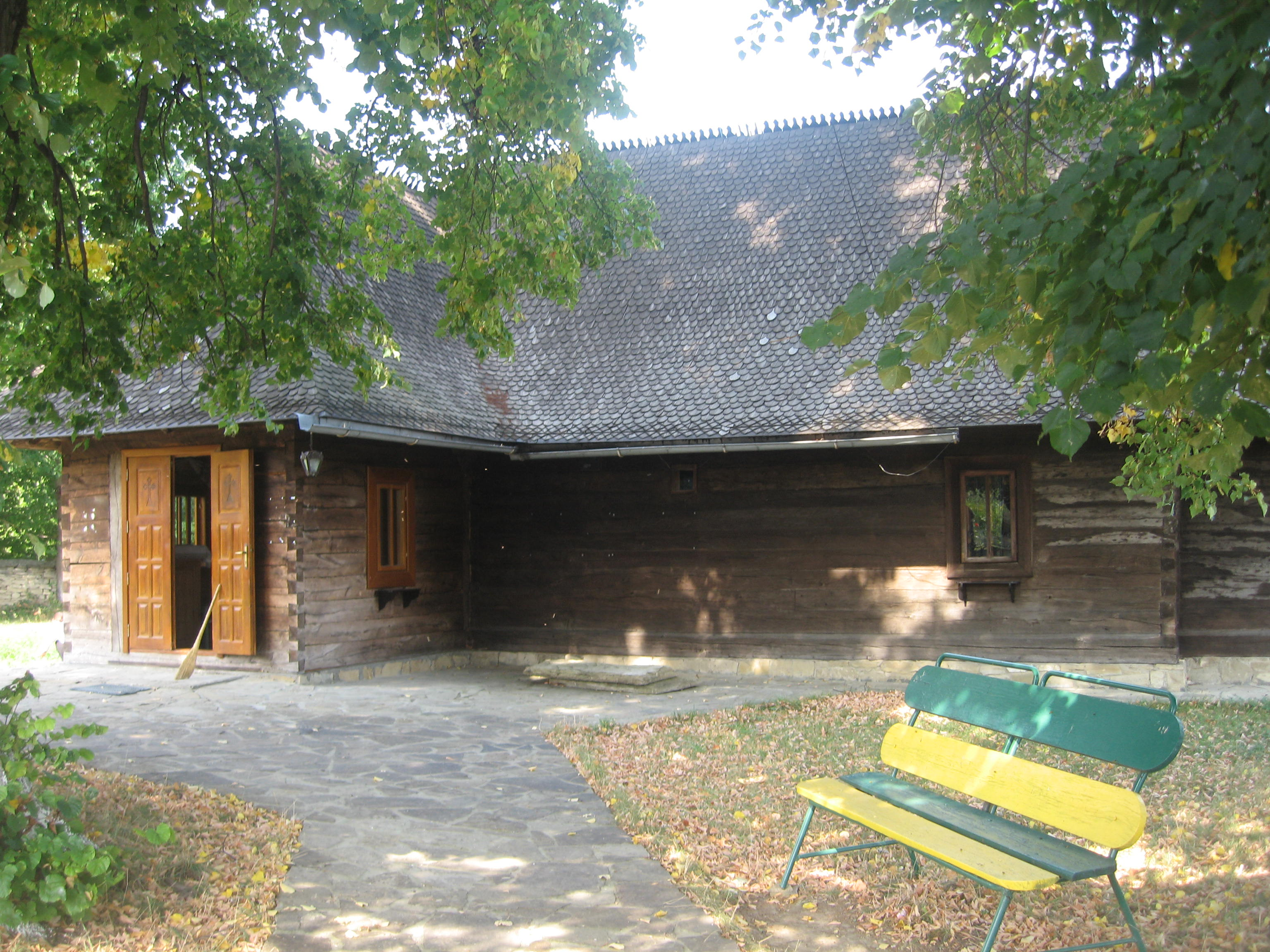
The wooden church in Adâncata (2009)

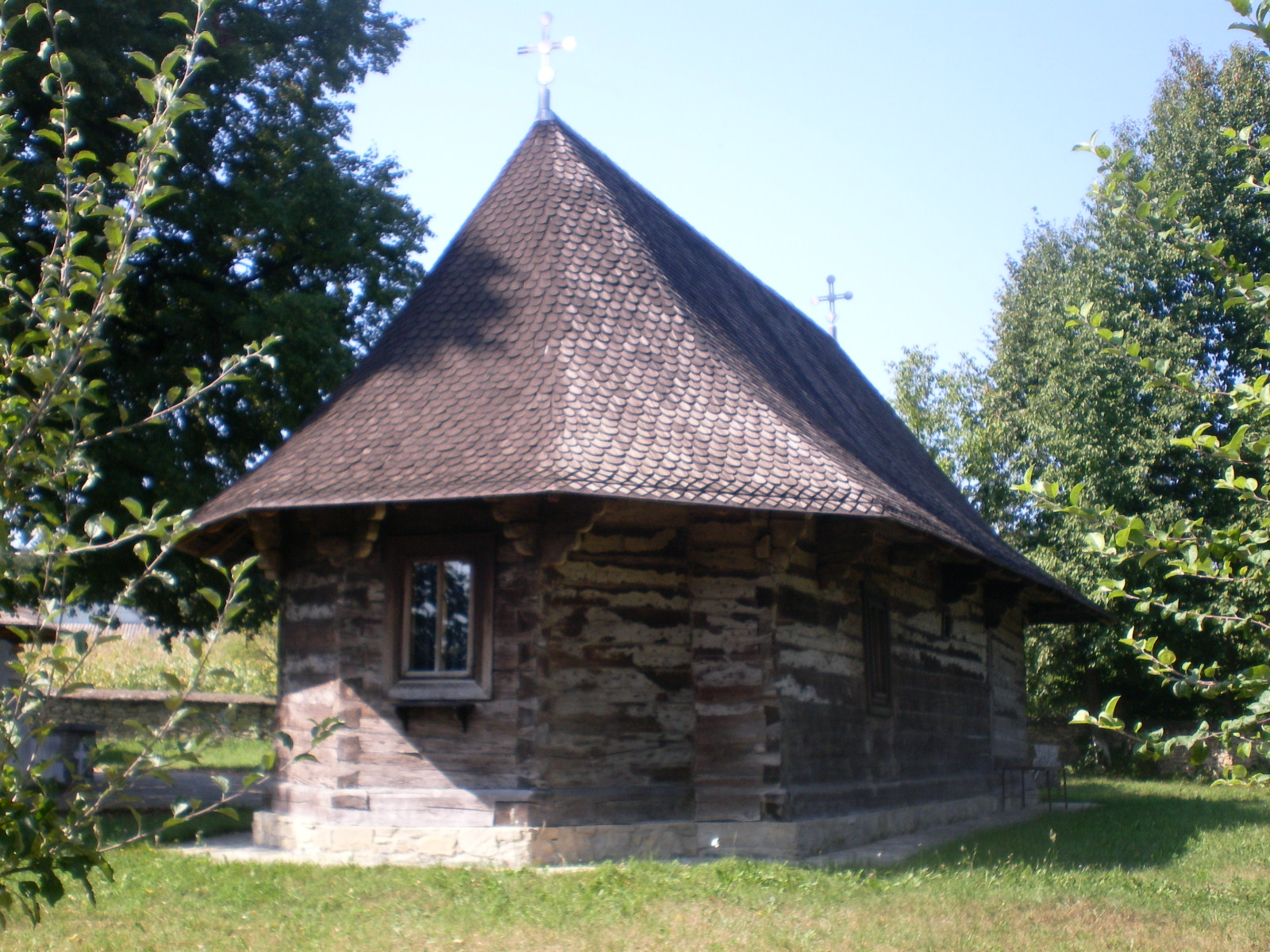
The wooden church in Adâncata (2009)

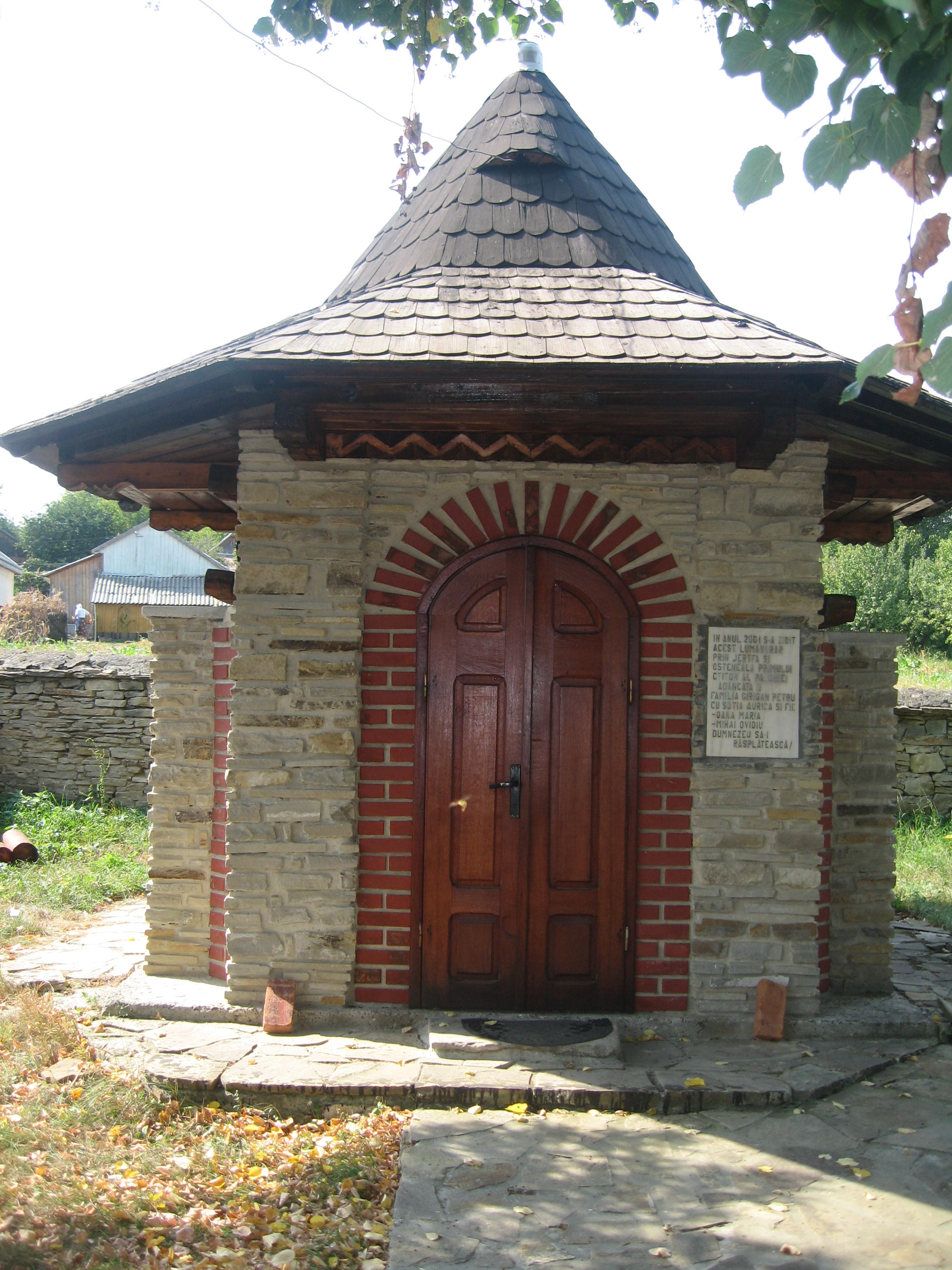
The wooden church in Adâncata (2009)
