= Voineasa, Olt =

Voineasa
- Commune
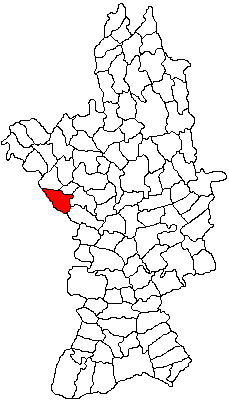
- Location in Olt County

- Location in Romania
- Coordinates: 44°17′N 24°8′E
- Country: Romania
- County: Olt
- Area: 45.82 km^{2} (17.69 sq mi)
- Population (2021-12-01): 2,038
  - Density: 44.48/km^{2} (115.2/sq mi)
- Time zone: UTC+02:00 (EET)
  - Summer (DST): UTC+03:00 (EEST)
- Vehicle reg.: OT

Voineasa is a commune in Olt County, Oltenia, Romania. It is composed of five villages: Blaj, Mărgăritești, Racovița, Rusăneștii de Sus, and Voineasa.
