= Constantin Dumitrescu (general) =

Romanian major general

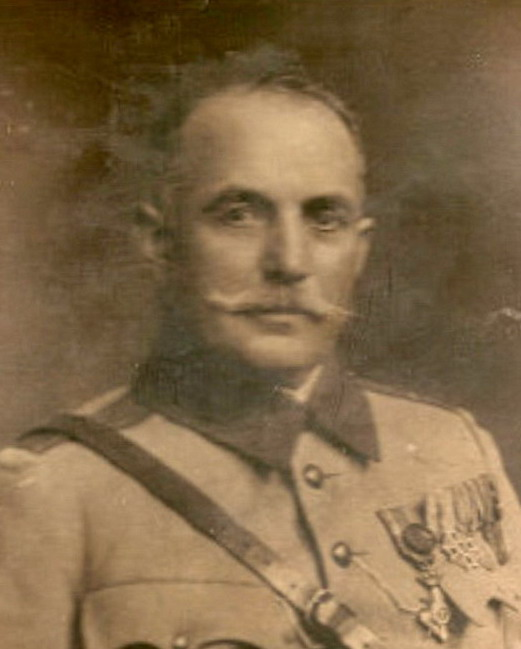
- Dumitrescu in 1919
- Born: 25 February 1868; Morunglav, Romanați County, Romania
- Died: 24 January 1935 (aged 66); Craiova, Kingdom of Romania
- Military career
- Allegiance: Kingdom of Romania
- Branch: Army
- Service years: 1892–1929
- Rank: Major General
- Conflicts: World War I; Battle of Turtucaia; First Battle of the Jiu Valley; Hungarian–Romanian War
- Awards: Order of the Star of Romania, Grand Officer rank Order of the Crown (Romania), Grand Officer rank Czechoslovak War Cross 1918

Constantin Dumitrescu (February 25, 1868 – January 24, 1935) was a Romanian major general.

Born in Morunglav, Romanați County in 1868, his parents were Dumitrache and Nicolița Ioan; the surname Dumitrescu was adopted later. His father was possibly of Greek origin. The future general was nicknamed “Turcu” (“the Turk”) because he was intransigent and did not accept to be contradicted.

In 1887, he entered the school for soldiers’ sons in Craiova, entering the officers’ school in 1890. He graduated in 1892 as a second lieutenant. The same year, he was assigned to the Rovine Regiment, serving there until 1896, when he was promoted to lieutenant. In 1897, he married Elena Dăbuleanu. His regimental service was interrupted in 1900–1901, when he was assigned to the soldiers’ sons’ school. In 1904, he became a captain, and was promoted to major in 1911, and to lieutenant colonel in early 1916.

Soon after Romania's entry into World War I he fought with bravery in September 1916 at the Battle of Turtucaia, and in October at the First Battle of the Jiu Valley. He was promoted to colonel afterward, and in September 1917, he was named brigadier general and put in command of the 22nd Infantry Brigade.

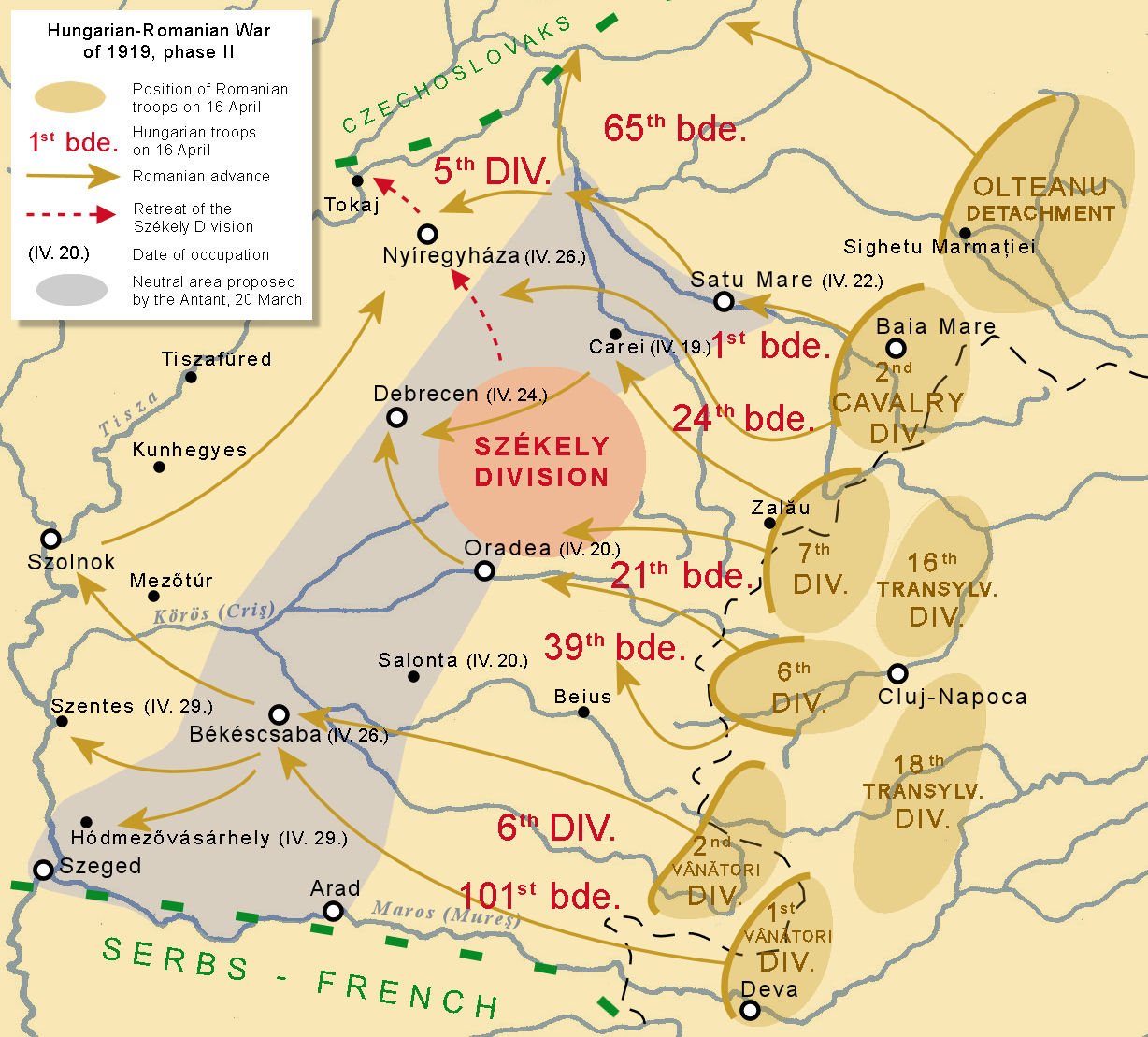
Romanian Army operations in the Hungarian–Romanian War in April 1919

Dumitrescu played an important role in the Hungarian–Romanian War. On April 18, 1919, he was appointed commanding officer of the 7th Division, replacing General Constantin Neculcea. Starting a few days earlier from its positions around Zalău, the 7th Division attacked towards Carei and Oradea, then occupied Debrecen, after which it marched on to Karcag and Tiszafüred. On July 19, General Gheorghe Mărdărescu, the commander of the Romanian Army in Transylvania, put Dumitrescu in charge of the front line in the Madaras sector. Together with the forces of Generals Ștefan Holban (in charge of the Fegyvernek sector) and Traian Moșoiu (in charge of the Törökszentmiklós sector), Dumitrescu's troops crossed the Tisza River at Kisköre on July 31, and eventually reached Budapest at the beginning of August.

In October 1920 Dumitrescu was put in command of the 11th Division. Named major general in March 1924, he assumed the next month command of the 1st Army Corps. He entered the reserves in October 1929, and died in Craiova in 1935.

His awards include the Order of the Crown (1910, 1919, 1924, the latter of the grand officer rank), the Order of the Star of Romania (1917, 1922, 1928, the latter of the grand officer rank) and the Czechoslovak War Cross 1918 (1928).
