= Pleșoiu =

- Commune
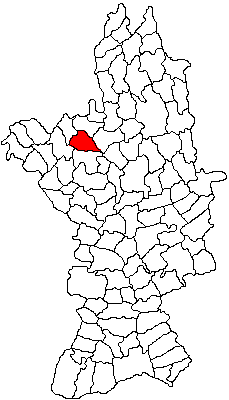
- Location in Olt County

- Location in Romania
- Coordinates: 44°28′N 24°16′E
- Country: Romania
- County: Olt
- Population (2021-12-01): 2,785
- Time zone: EET/EEST (UTC+2/+3)
- Vehicle reg.: OT

Pleșoiu is a commune in Olt County, Oltenia, Romania. It is composed of seven villages: Arcești, Arcești-Cot, Cocorăști, Doba, Pleșoiu, Schitu din Deal and Schitu din Vale.
