= Morunglav =

- Commune
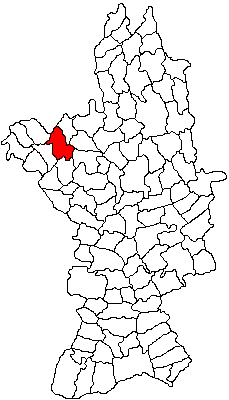
- Location in Olt County

- Location in Romania
- Coordinates: 44°28′N 24°7′E
- Country: Romania
- County: Olt

Government
  - Mayor (2020–2024): Nicolae Cărămizaru (PNL)
- Area: 62.1 km^{2} (24.0 sq mi)
- Elevation: 148 m (486 ft)
- Population (2021-12-01): 2,125
  - Density: 34/km^{2} (89/sq mi)
- Time zone: EET/EEST (UTC+2/+3)
- Postal code: 237270
- Area code: +40 249
- Vehicle reg.: OT
- Website: www.primariamorunglav.ro

Morunglav is a commune in Olt County, Oltenia, Romania. It is composed of five villages: Bărăști, Ghioșani, Morunești, Morunglav, and Poiana Mare.

== Natives ==
- Constantin Dumitrescu (1868–1935), major general
