= Tufeni =

- Commune
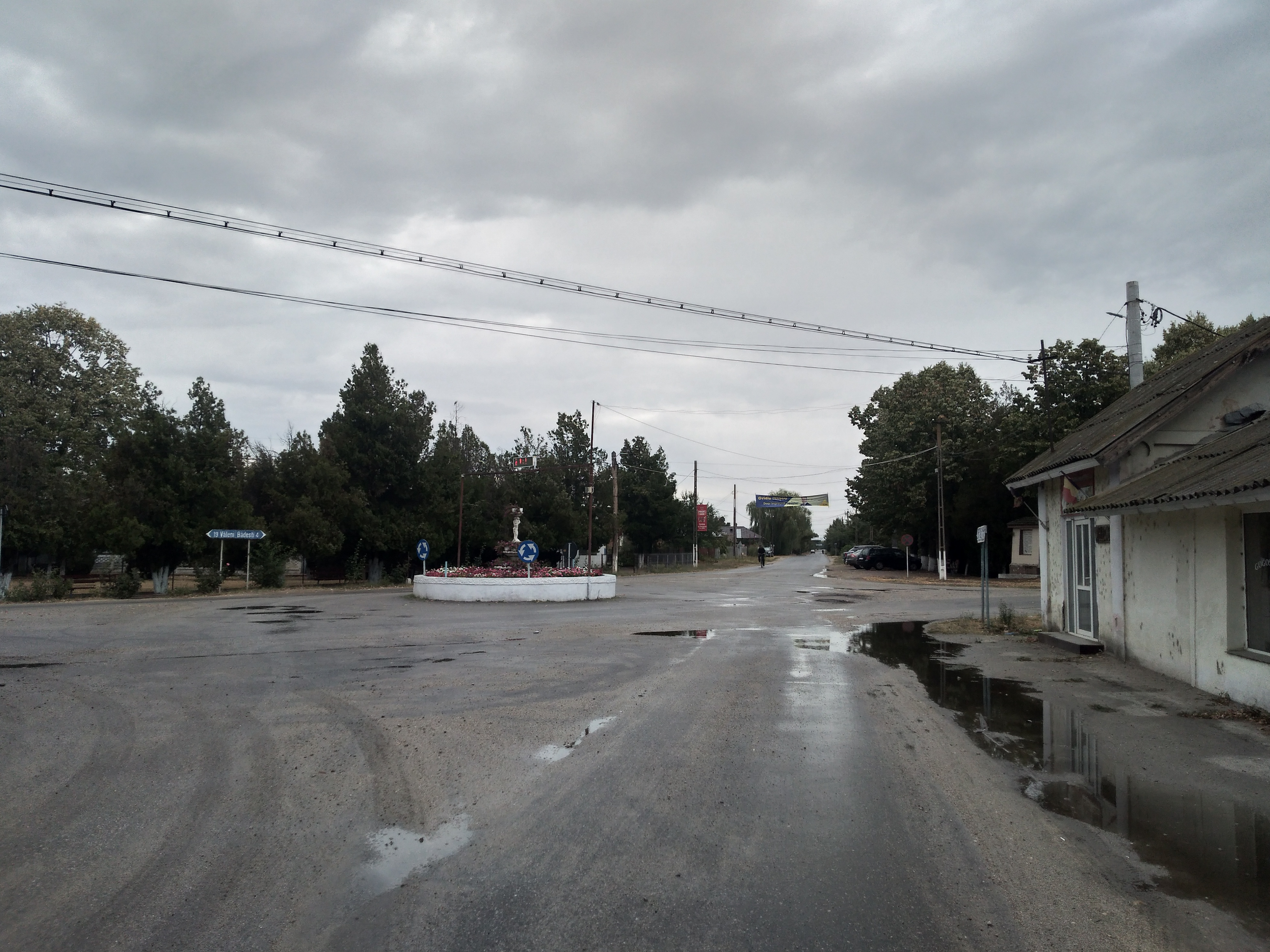

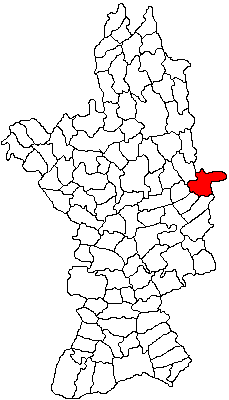
- Location in Olt County

- Location in Romania
- Coordinates: 44.372°N 24.797°E
- Country: Romania
- County: Olt
- Population (2021-12-01): 2,495
- Time zone: UTC+02:00 (EET)
  - Summer (DST): UTC+03:00 (EEST)
- Vehicle reg.: OT

Tufeni is a commune in Olt County, Muntenia, Romania. It is composed of three villages: Barza, Stoborăști and Tufeni.
