= Coteana =

- Commune
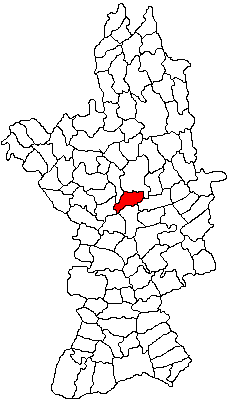
- Location in Olt County

- Location in Romania
- Coordinates: 44°18′N 24°28′E
- Country: Romania
- County: Olt
- Population (2021-12-01): 2,071
- Time zone: UTC+02:00 (EET)
  - Summer (DST): UTC+03:00 (EEST)
- Vehicle reg.: OT

Coteana is a commune in Olt County, Muntenia, Romania. It is composed of a single village, Coteana, situated at 19 kilometers from Slatina. According to the 2021 Romanian census, the population of Coteana is 2,071 inhabitants. This is a decrease from the 2,435 residents recorded during the 2011 census.

== Natives ==
- Adrian-Ionuț Chesnoiu (born 1982), politician
