= Izvoarele, Olt =

Izvoarele
- Commune
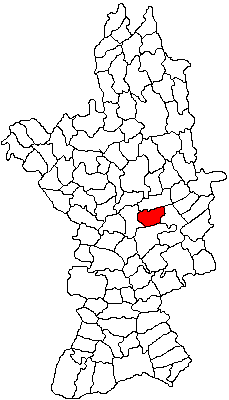
- Location in Olt County

- Location in Romania
- Coordinates: 44°16′N 24°32′E
- Country: Romania
- County: Olt
- Population (2021-12-01): 3,218
- Time zone: EET/EEST (UTC+2/+3)
- Vehicle reg.: OT

Izvoarele is a small commune in the Olt County, Muntenia, Romania. It is composed of two villages, Alimănești and Izvoarele.

A quiet, mostly self-sufficient commune, it has been slowly developing since the 1990s, with small improvements such as the mid-2000s paving of the main east–west road that had been a dirt road. Modern architecture is to be seen in some of the recently built houses, while some are very old, outlining the mixed population of rich and poor. It is surrounded by the beautifully wild, untamed countryside. A railway bridge made of massive stone lies to the south of the railway station.
