= Mădulari =

- Commune
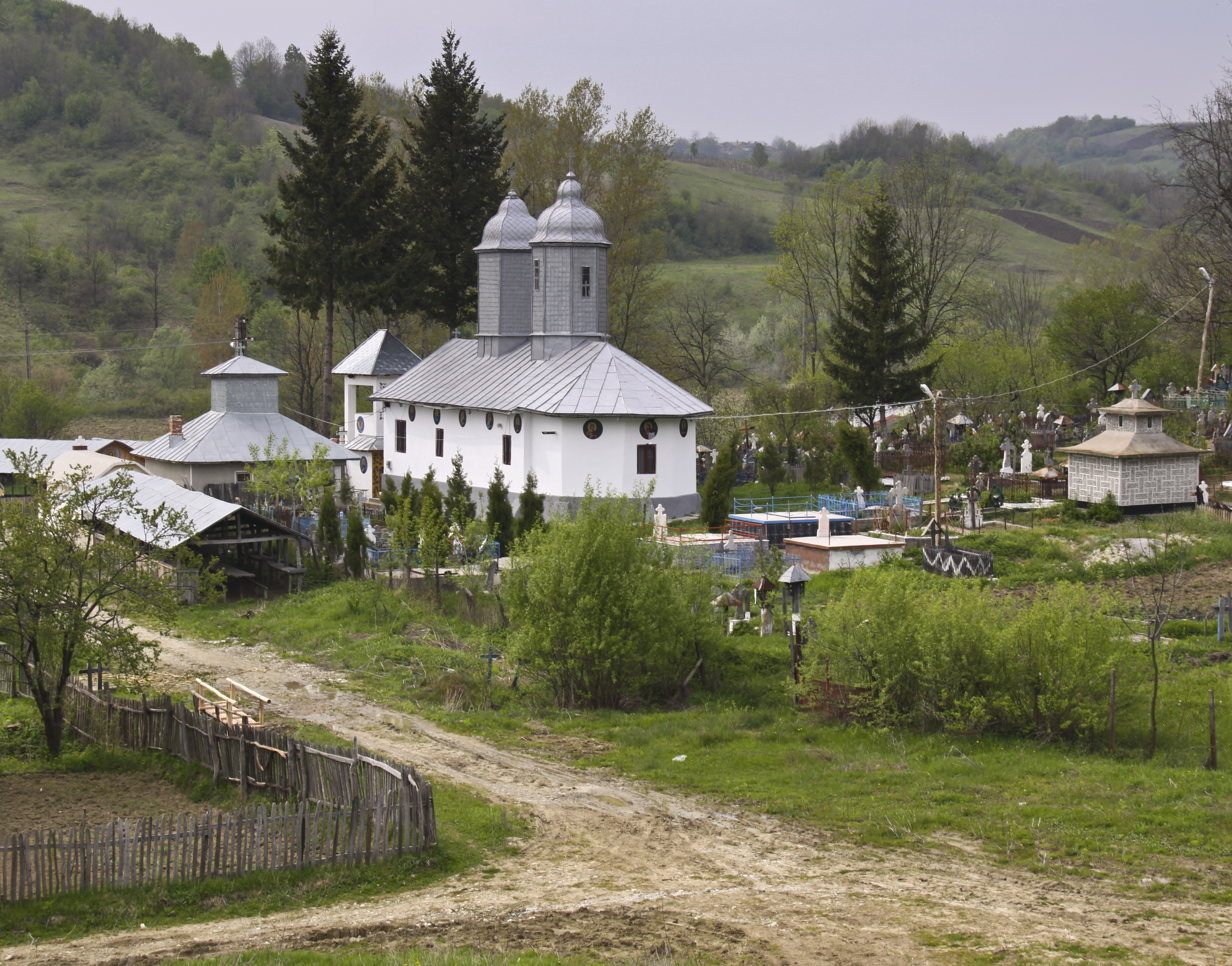
- Wooden church in Dimulești

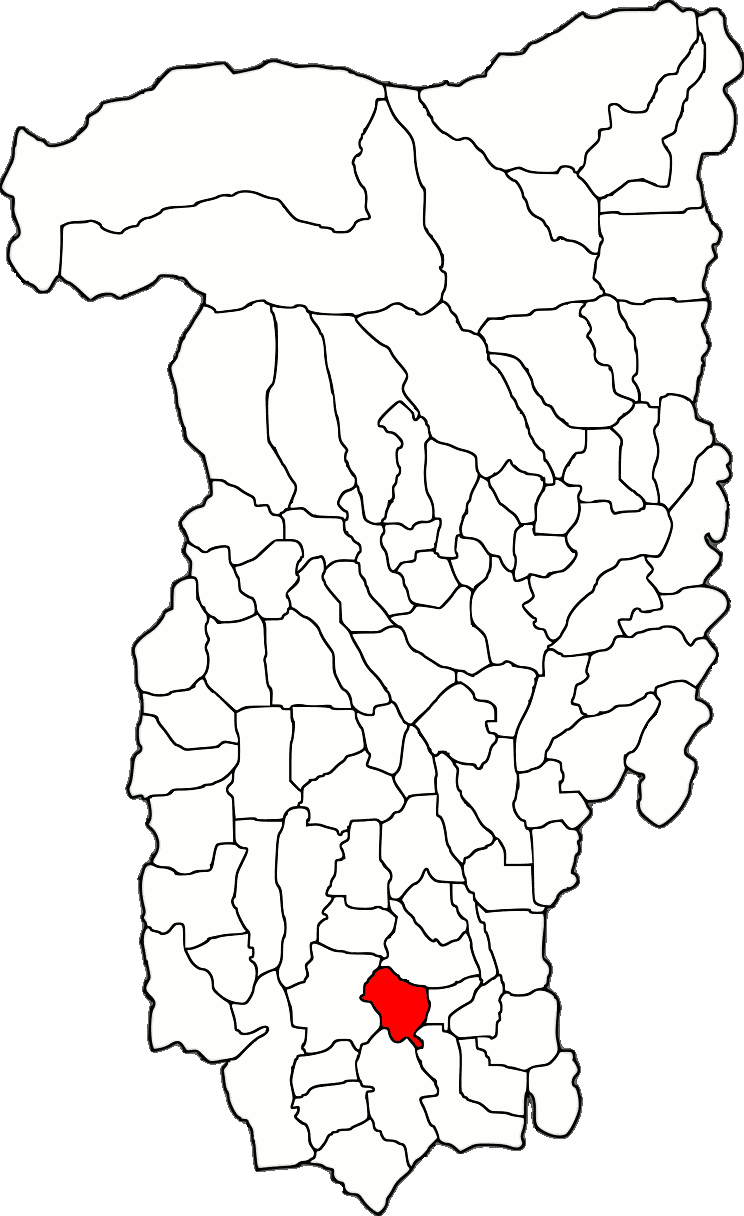
- Location in Vâlcea County

- Location in Romania
- Coordinates: 44°41′N 24°06′E
- Country: Romania
- County: Vâlcea

Government
  - Mayor (2024–2028): Ion Daniel Dimulescu (PSD)
- Area: 34 km^{2} (13 sq mi)
- Elevation: 404 m (1,325 ft)
- Population (2021-12-01): 1,197
  - Density: 35/km^{2} (91/sq mi)
- Time zone: UTC+02:00 (EET)
  - Summer (DST): UTC+03:00 (EEST)
- Postal code: 247360
- Area code: +(40) 250
- Vehicle reg.: VL
- Website: www.primaria-madulari.ro

Mădulari is a commune located in Vâlcea County, Oltenia, Romania. It is composed of six villages: Mădulari, Bălșoara, Bănțești, Dimulești, Iacovile, and Mamu.

The Mamu gas field is located on the territory of the commune.

Historical population
Year	Pop.	±%
2002	1,749	—
2011	1,459	−16.6%
2021	1,197	−18.0%
Source: Census data
