= Murgași =

- Commune
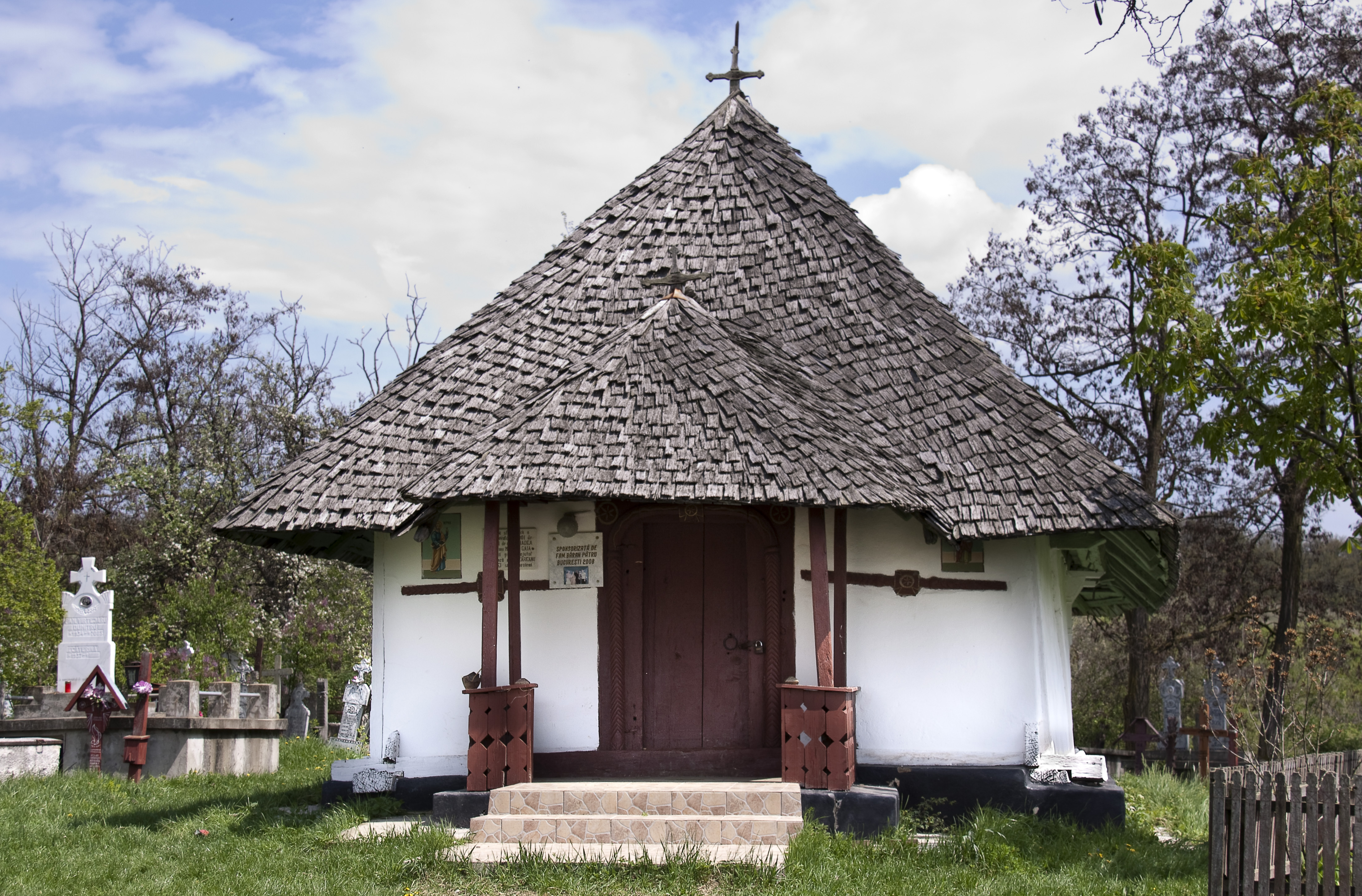
- Wooden church in Balota de Sus

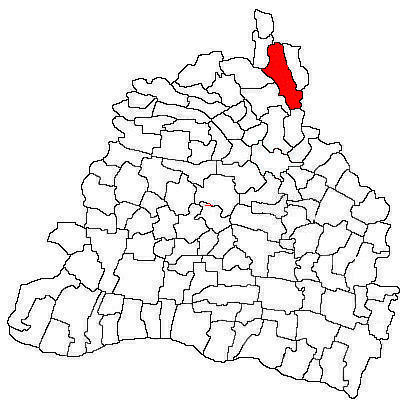
- Location in Dolj County

- Location in Romania
- Coordinates: 44°30′N 23°52′E
- Country: Romania
- County: Dolj

Government
  - Mayor (2020–2024): Nicu-Daniel Țeligrădeanu (PSD)
- Area: 92 km^{2} (36 sq mi)
- Elevation: 197 m (646 ft)
- Population (2021-12-01): 2,191
  - Density: 24/km^{2} (62/sq mi)
- Time zone: UTC+02:00 (EET)
  - Summer (DST): UTC+03:00 (EEST)
- Postal code: 207420
- Area code: +(40) 251
- Vehicle reg.: DJ
- Website: www.murgasi.ro

Murgași is a commune in Dolj County, Oltenia, Romania with a population of 2,191 people as of 2021. It is composed of eight villages: Balota de Jos (the commune center), Balota de Sus, Bușteni, Gaia, Murgași, Picăturile, Rupturile, and Velești.

The commune is located in the northeastern part of the county and belongs to the Craiova metropolitan area.

Historical population
Year	Pop.	±%
2002	2,775	—
2011	2,508	−9.6%
2021	2,191	−12.6%
Source: Census data

== Natives ==
- Vasile Drăguț (1928—1987), art critic and academic
