= Bobicești =

- Commune
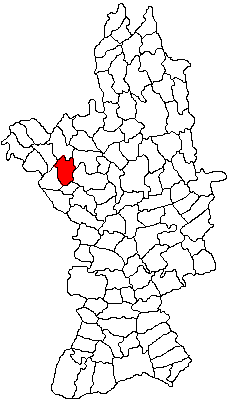
- Location in Olt County

- Location in Romania
- Coordinates: 44°24′N 24°8′E
- Country: Romania
- County: Olt
- Population (2021-12-01): 3,063
- Time zone: EET/EEST (UTC+2/+3)
- Vehicle reg.: OT

Bobicești is a commune in Olt County, Oltenia, Romania. It is composed of eight villages: Bechet, Belgun, Bobicești, Chintești, Comănești, Govora, Leotești and Mirila.
