= Perieți, Olt =

Perieți
- Commune
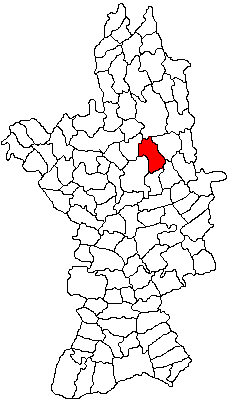
- Location in Olt County

- Location in Romania
- Coordinates: 44°25′N 24°33′E
- Country: Romania
- County: Olt
- Population (2021-12-01): 1,856
- Time zone: EET/EEST (UTC+2/+3)
- Vehicle reg.: OT

Perieți is a commune in Olt County, Muntenia, Romania. It is composed of three villages: Măgura, Mierleștii de Sus and Perieți.
