= Pârșcoveni =

- Commune
- Location in Romania
- Coordinates: 44°18′N 24°14′E
- Country: Romania
- County: Olt

Government
  - Mayor (2020–2024): Dumitru Dănuț Matei (PSD)
- Area: 54.2 km^{2} (20.9 sq mi)
- Elevation: 125 m (410 ft)
- Population (2021-12-01): 2,744
  - Density: 51/km^{2} (130/sq mi)
- Time zone: EET/EEST (UTC+2/+3)
- Postal code: 237325
- Area code: +(40) 249
- Vehicle reg.: OT
- Website: primariapirscoveni.ro

Pârșcoveni is a commune in Olt County, Oltenia, Romania. It is composed of three villages: Butoi, Olari, and Pârșcoveni. Until 2004, it also included Șopârlița, which that year was split off to form a separate commune.
