= Mărunței =

- Commune
- Location in Romania
- Coordinates: 44.2391°N 24.4620°E
- Country: Romania
- County: Olt
- Population (2021-12-01): 3,627
- Time zone: EET/EEST (UTC+2/+3)
- Vehicle reg.: OT

Mărunței is a commune in Olt County, Muntenia, Romania. It is composed of three villages: Bălănești, Malu Roșu and Mărunței.
