= Strejești =

- Commune
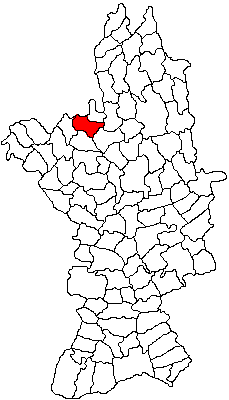
- Location in Olt County

- Location in Romania
- Coordinates: 44°32′N 24°16′E
- Country: Romania
- County: Olt
- Area: 47 km^{2} (18 sq mi)
- Population (2021-12-01): 2,726
  - Density: 58/km^{2} (150/sq mi)
- Time zone: UTC+02:00 (EET)
  - Summer (DST): UTC+03:00 (EEST)
- Vehicle reg.: OT

Strejești is a commune in Olt County, Oltenia, Romania. It is composed of four villages: Colibași, Mamura, Strejești and Strejeștii de Sus.
