= Dobrețu =

- Commune
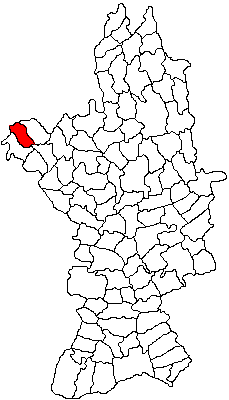
- Location in Olt County

- Location in Romania
- Coordinates: 44°30′N 23°57′E
- Country: Romania
- County: Olt
- Population (2021-12-01): 1,105
- Time zone: EET/EEST (UTC+2/+3)
- Vehicle reg.: OT

Dobrețu is a commune in Olt County, Oltenia, Romania. It is composed of three villages: Curtișoara, Dobrețu and Horezu.
