= Vulpeni =

- Commune
- Seal

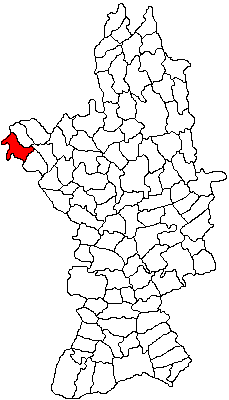
- Location in Olt County

- Location in Romania
- Coordinates: 44°28′N 23°55′E
- Country: Romania
- County: Olt
- Area: 36.66 km^{2} (14.15 sq mi)
- Population (2021-12-01): 1,900
  - Density: 52/km^{2} (130/sq mi)
- Time zone: UTC+02:00 (EET)
  - Summer (DST): UTC+03:00 (EEST)
- Vehicle reg.: OT

Vulpeni is a commune in Olt County, Oltenia, Romania. It is composed of ten villages: Cotorbești, Gropșani, Mardale, Pescărești, Plopșorelu, Prisaca, Simniceni, Tabaci, Valea Satului and Vulpeni.
