= Bârza =

- Commune
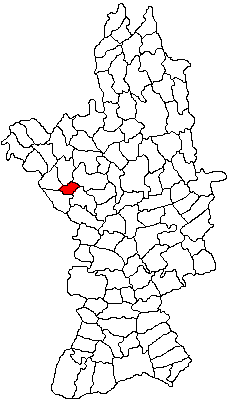
- Location in Olt County

- Location in Romania
- Coordinates: 44°19′N 24°09′E
- Country: Romania
- County: Olt

Government
  - Mayor (2020–2024): Ion Anuța (ALDE)
- Area: 23.47 km^{2} (9.06 sq mi)
- Elevation: 118 m (387 ft)
- Population (2021-12-01): 2,303
  - Density: 98/km^{2} (250/sq mi)
- Time zone: EET/EEST (UTC+2/+3)
- Postal code: 237030
- Area code: +40 x49
- Vehicle reg.: OT
- Website: www.primariabirzaolt.ro

Bârza is a commune in Olt County, Oltenia, Romania. It is composed of two villages, Bârza and Braneț.

== Natives ==
- Pan M. Vizirescu
