= Balș =

- Town
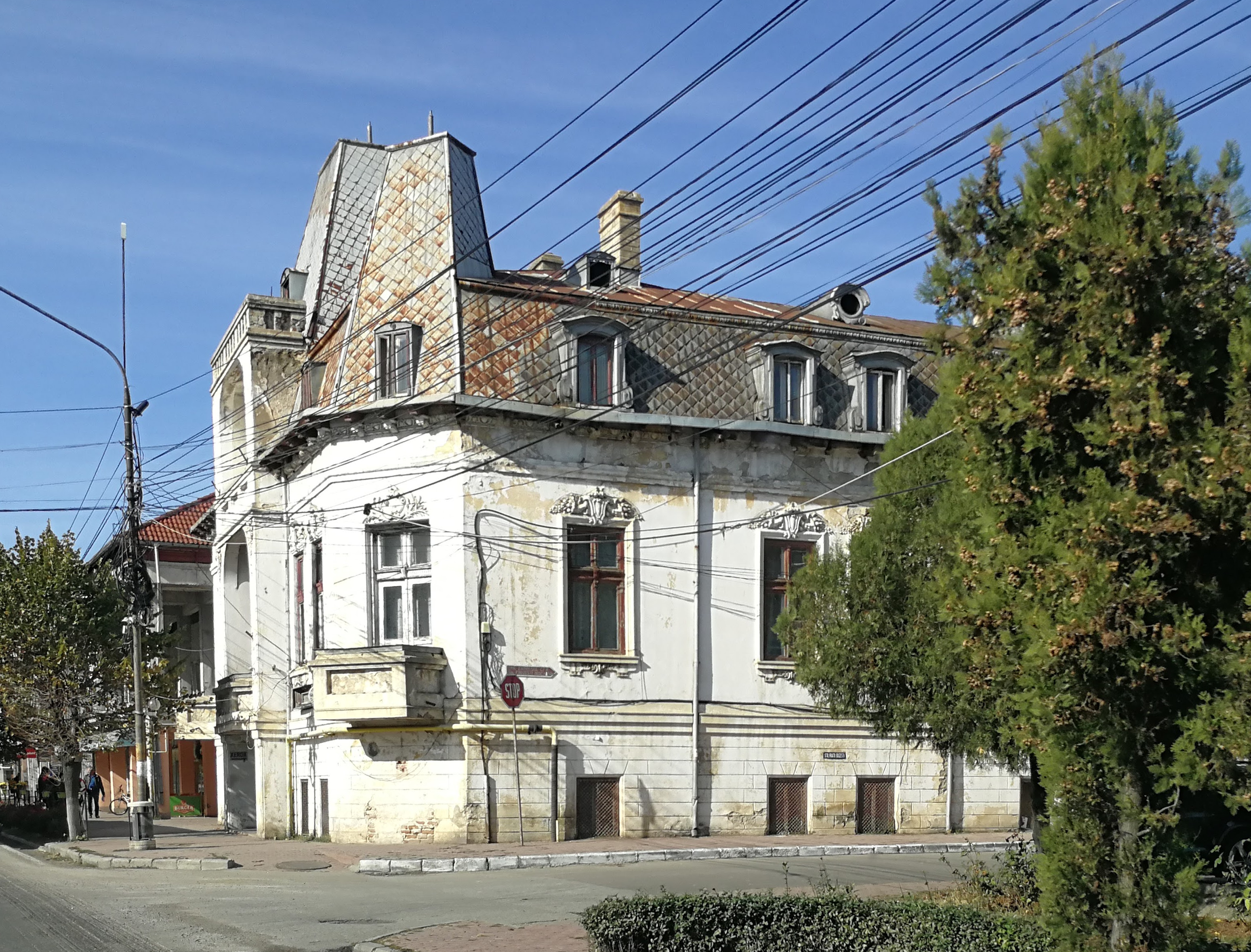

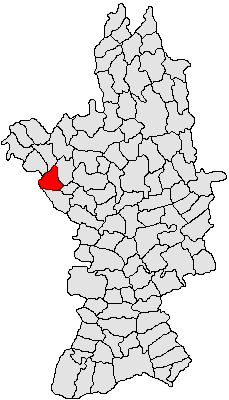
- Location in Olt County

- Location in Romania
- Coordinates: 44°21′0″N 24°5′58″E
- Country: Romania
- County: Olt

Government
  - Mayor (2024–2028): Cătălin-Ștefan Rotea (PSD)
- Area: 41.13 km^{2} (15.88 sq mi)
- Elevation: 129 m (423 ft)
- Population (2021-12-01): 16,114
  - Density: 391.8/km^{2} (1,015/sq mi)
- Time zone: UTC+02:00 (EET)
  - Summer (DST): UTC+03:00 (EEST)
- Postal code: 235100
- Area code: (+40) 0249
- Vehicle reg.: OT
- Website: primariabals.eu

Balș (Romanian pronunciation: [balʃ]) is a town in Olt County, Oltenia, Romania. The town administers three villages: Corbeni, Româna, and Teiș.

== Geography ==
The town is situated on the Wallachian Plain and lies on the banks of the river Olteț. It is located in the northwestern part of the county, on the border with Dolj County, 26 km (16 mi) west of the county seat, Slatina.

== Etymology ==
There are three hypotheses about the town's name:

1. The locality was named after the Balșița brook.
2. The name comes from the Turkish word "Baliş" (honey), as there is a large apiculture area there.
3. A boyar named Balș settled here in the 5th or 6th century.

== Population ==
Historical population
| Year | Pop. | ±% |
|---|---|---|
| 1864 | 1,700 | — |
| 1884 | 2,500 | +47.1% |
| 1921 | 5,000 | +100.0% |
| 1938 | 5,300 | +6.0% |
| 1948 | 6,128 | +15.6% |
| 1973 | 11,578 | +88.9% |
| 1992 | 24,560 | +112.1% |
| 2002 | 21,195 | −13.7% |
| 2011 | 18,164 | −14.3% |
| 2021 | 16,114 | −11.3% |
Source: Census data

At the 2002 census, the town had a population of 21,195; there were 20,552 Romanians, 619 Roma, and 27 others. Listed by religion: 21,043 were Eastern Orthodox, 47 Seventh-Day Adventists, 36 Baptists, 19 Pentecostals, 8 Roman-Catholics, 5 Atheists, and 32 from other religions. At the 2021 census, Balș had a population of 16,114; of those, 81.73% were Romanians and 6.32% Roma.

== History ==
- 1450 – The estimated date when Balș was established.
- 1564 – First mention of Balș in a document

== Natives ==
- Nicușor Bănică (born 1984), footballer
- Eugen Căpățînă (born 1986), rugby player
- Claudia Constantinescu (born 1994), handballer
- Ion Dumitra (born 1976), footballer
- Cornel Feruță (born 1975), diplomat
- Petre Pandrea (1904–1968), social philosopher, memoirist, and political activist
- Cerasela Pătrașcu (born 1992), artistic gymnast
- Daniel Stana (born 1982), footballer
