= Găvănești =

- Commune
- Location in Romania
- Coordinates: 44°25′N 24°01′E
- Country: Romania
- County: Olt
- Population (2021-12-01): 1,790
- Time zone: EET/EEST (UTC+2/+3)
- Vehicle reg.: OT

Găvănești is a commune in Olt County, Oltenia, Romania. It is composed of four villages: Băleasa, Broșteni, Dâmburile and Găvănești. These were part of Baldovinești Commune until 2004, when they were split off.
