= Olt County =

County of Romania

Coordinates: 44.4333°N 24.3667°E

Olt County Județul Olt
- County
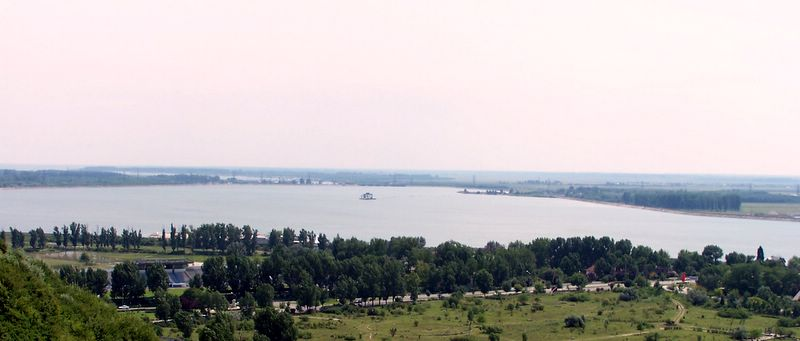
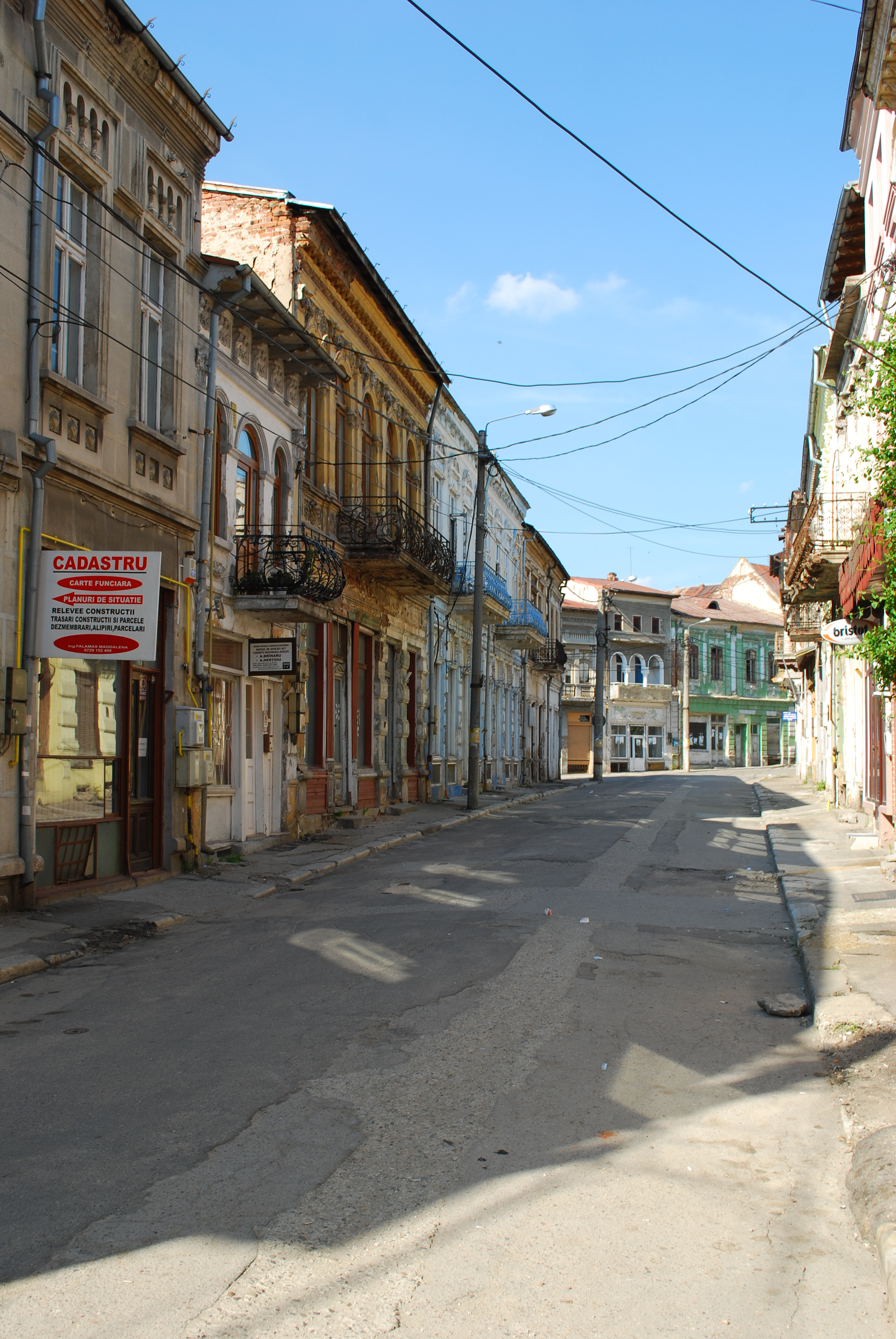
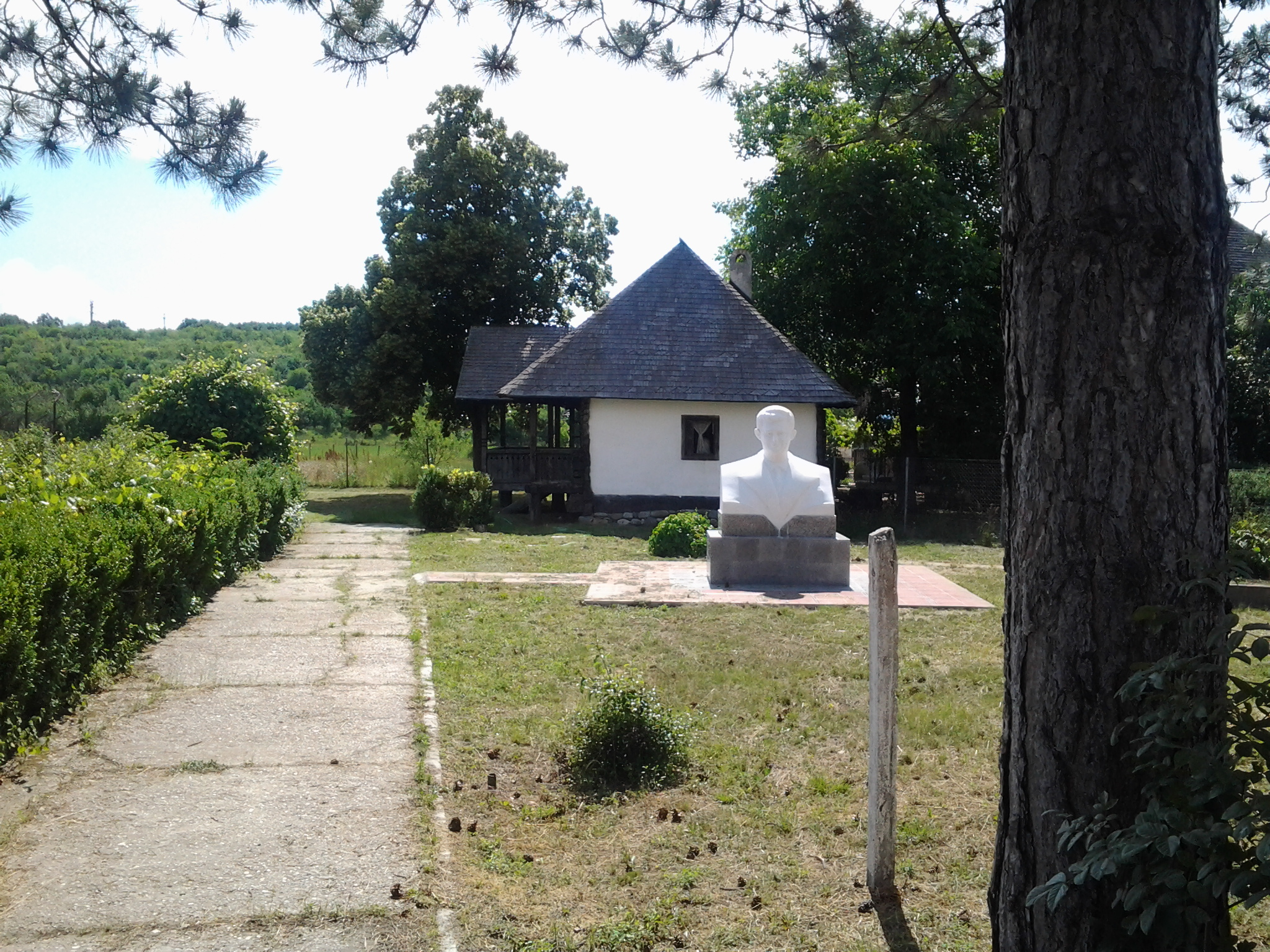
- Olt River Slatina Scornicești

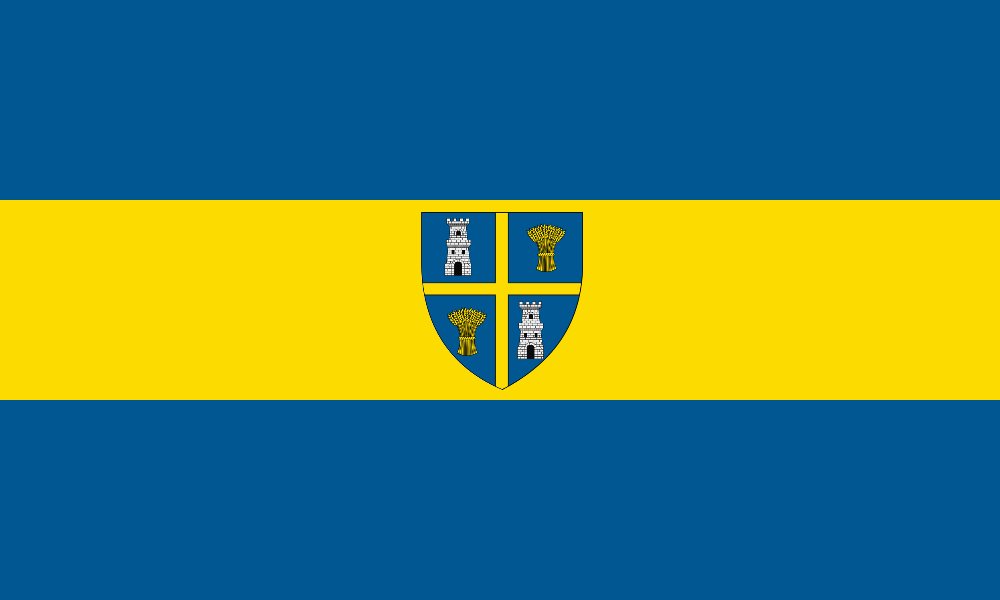
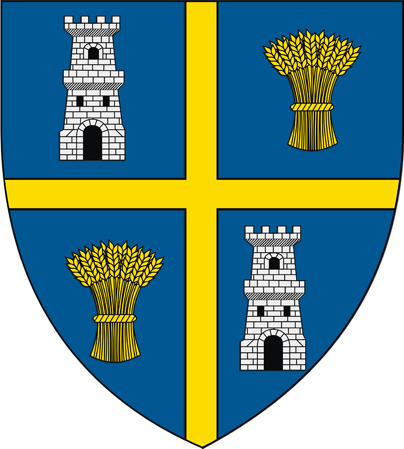
- Flag Coat of arms

- Country: Romania
- Development region: Sud-Vest
- Historical region: Wallachia
- Capital: Slatina

Government
  - President of the County Board: Marius Oprescu (PSD)
  - Prefect: Stefan Nicolae

Area
  - Total: 5,498 km^{2} (2,123 sq mi)
  - Rank: 22nd

Population (2021-12-01)
  - Total: 383,280
  - Rank: 19th
  - Density: 69.71/km^{2} (180.6/sq mi)
- Telephone code: (+40) 249 or (+40) 349
- ISO 3166 code: RO-OT
- GDP (nominal): US$ 2.158 billion (2015)
- GDP per capita: US$ 5,194 (2015)
- Website: County Council; Prefecture

Olt County (Romanian pronunciation: [olt]) is a county (județ) of Romania on the border with Bulgaria, in the historical regions of Oltenia and Muntenia (the regions are separated by the Olt river). The capital city is Slatina.

== History ==
On 24 August 2017, the Olt County Council decided to hold a name referendum on 15 October 2017 for the proposal to change the county name to "Olt-Romanați". The referendum was eventually held on 6 and 7 October 2018. The vote was nullified, as turnout was 27.19%, below the required threshold of 30%; therefore, the Olt County retains its current name.

== Demographics ==
In 2011, the county had a population of 415,530 and the population density was 75.57/km^{2} (195.7/sq mi).

- Romanians - 98.01%
- Romani - 1.9%

Year	County population
1948	442,442
1956	458,982 ▲
1966	476,513 ▲
1977	518,804 ▲
1992	520,966 ▲
2002	489,274 ▼
2011	415,530 ▼
2021	383,280 ▼

The county is a mainly rural one, with over 60% of the population living in villages.

== Geography ==
The county lies in a flat area on the western part of the Romanian Plain. It is crossed by rivers from north to south, including the Olt River which gave the county its name. The Danube forms a wide valley in the south, with many ponds and small channels, which are occasionally flooded.

=== Neighbours ===
- Teleorman County to the East.
- Dolj County to the West.
- Argeș County and Vâlcea County to the North.
- Bulgaria to the South - Vratsa Province and Pleven Province.

== Economy ==
The predominant industries in the county are:

- Metallurgy - aluminium and aluminium components.
- Railway equipment.
- Food and beverages industry.
- Textile industry.
- Mechanical components industry.

Agriculture is the main occupation in the county - over 58% of the population having agriculture as their main occupation. Both extensive agriculture, and small-scale, vegetables and fruits, are practiced. The area is well suited for irrigation.

== Tourism ==
The main destinations for tourists are:

- The city of Slatina.
- Fishing on the Danube and on the Olt River.
- Town of Corabia with an ancient Roman citadel, a large orthodox cathedral, Danube sunbathes, sailing and fishing.
- The town of Scornicești - the birthplace of Nicolae Ceaușescu.

== Politics ==
The Olt County Council, renewed at the 2024 local elections, consists of 32 councilors, with the following party composition:

Party	Seats	Current County Council
Social Democratic Party (PSD)	20	
National Liberal Party (PNL)	7	
Alliance for the Union of Romanians (AUR)	5	

== Administrative divisions ==
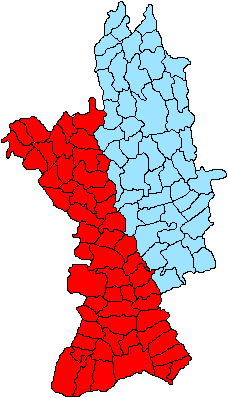
Map of the Olt County and its municipalities showing the parts at the east (part of Muntenia, in blue) and at the west (part of Oltenia, in red) of the Olt River

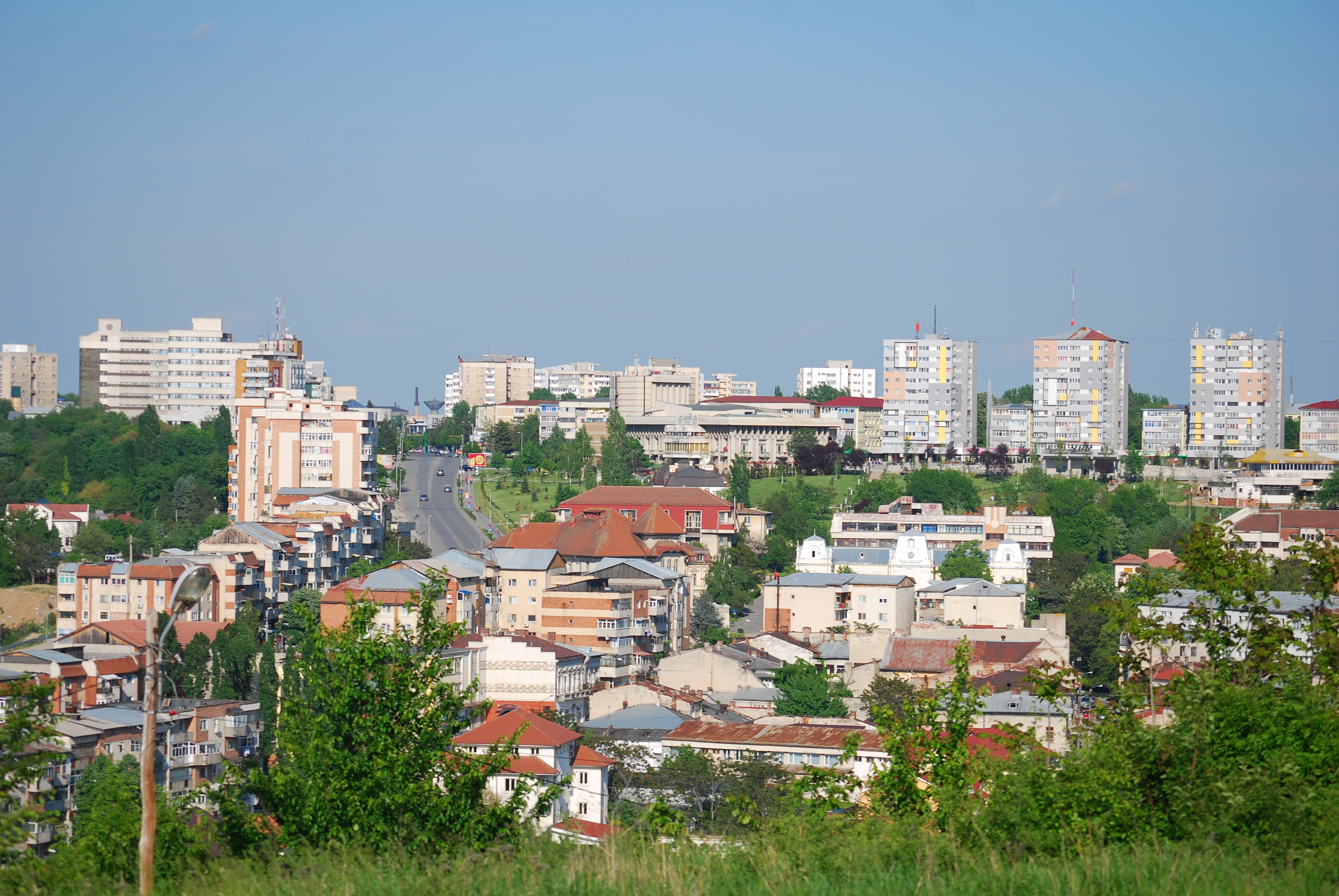
Slatina

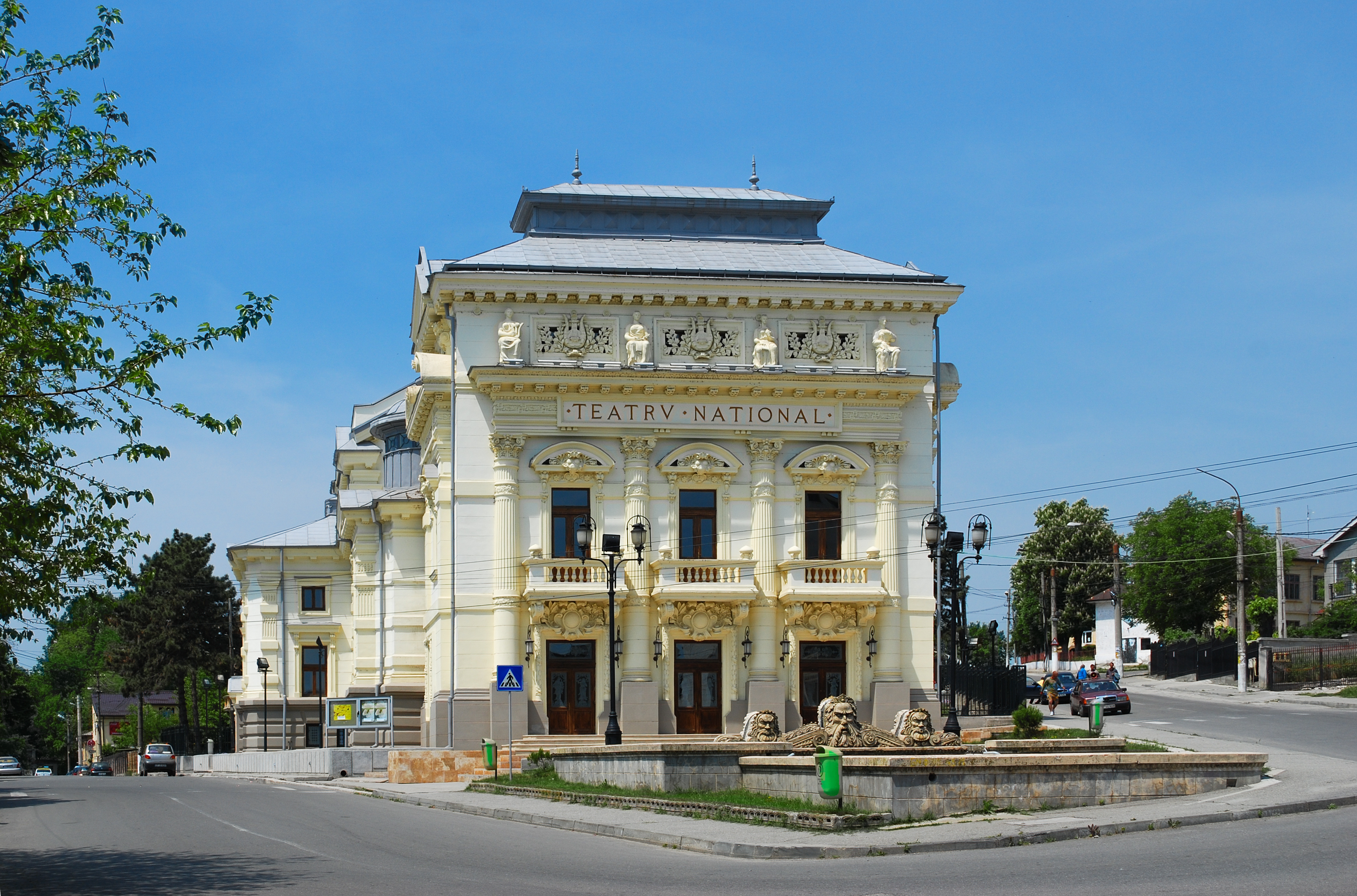
Caracal

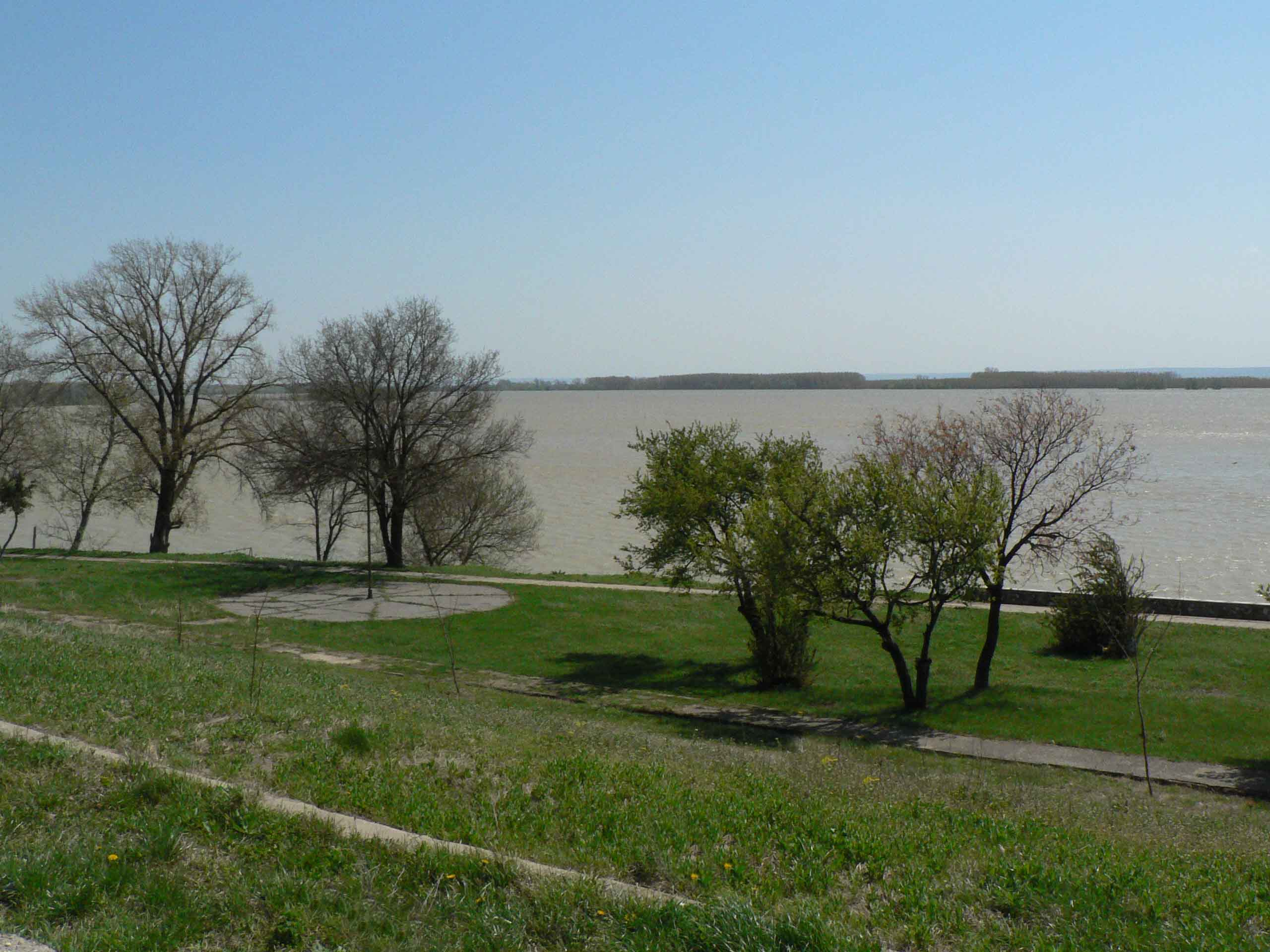
Danube at Corabia

Olt County has 2 municipalities, 6 towns and 104 communes:

- Municipalities
  - Caracal
  - Slatina - capital city; population: 87,608 (as of 2007)
- Towns
  - Balș
  - Corabia
  - Drăgănești-Olt
  - Piatra Olt
  - Potcoava
  - Scornicești
- Communes
  - Băbiciu
  - Baldovinești
  - Bălteni
  - Bărăști
  - Bârza
  - Bobicești
  - Brâncoveni
  - Brastavățu
  - Brebeni
  - Bucinișu
  - Cârlogani
  - Călui
  - Cezieni
  - Cilieni
  - Colonești
  - Corbu
  - Coteana
  - Crâmpoia
  - Cungrea
  - Curtișoara
  - Dăneasa
  - Deveselu
  - Dobrețu
  - Dobrosloveni
  - Dobroteasa
  - Dobrun
  - Drăghiceni
  - Făgețelu
  - Fălcoiu
  - Fărcașele
  - Găneasa
  - Găvănești
  - Gârcov
  - Giuvărăști
  - Ghimpețeni
  - Gostavățu
  - Grădinari
  - Grădinile
  - Grojdibodu
  - Gura Padinii
  - Ianca
  - Iancu Jianu
  - Icoana
  - Ipotești
  - Izbiceni
  - Izvoarele
  - Leleasca
  - Mărunței
  - Mihăești
  - Milcov
  - Morunglav
  - Movileni
  - Nicolae Titulescu
  - Obârșia
  - Oboga
  - Oporelu
  - Optași-Măgura
  - Orlea
  - Osica de Sus
  - Osica de Jos
  - Pârșcoveni
  - Perieți
  - Pleșoiu
  - Poboru
  - Priseaca
  - Radomirești
  - Redea
  - Rotunda
  - Rusănești
  - Sâmburești
  - Sârbii-Măgura
  - Scărișoara
  - Schitu
  - Seaca
  - Șerbănești
  - Slătioara
  - Șopârlița
  - Spineni
  - Sprâncenata
  - Ștefan cel Mare
  - Stoenești
  - Stoicănești
  - Strejești
  - Studina
  - Tătulești
  - Teslui
  - Tia Mare
  - Topana
  - Traian
  - Tufeni
  - Urzica
  - Vădastra
  - Vădăstrița
  - Vâlcele
  - Valea Mare
  - Văleni
  - Verguleasa
  - Vișina
  - Vișina Nouă
  - Vitomirești
  - Vlădila
  - Voineasa
  - Vulpeni
  - Vulturești

== Historical county ==
Județul Olt
- County (Județ)
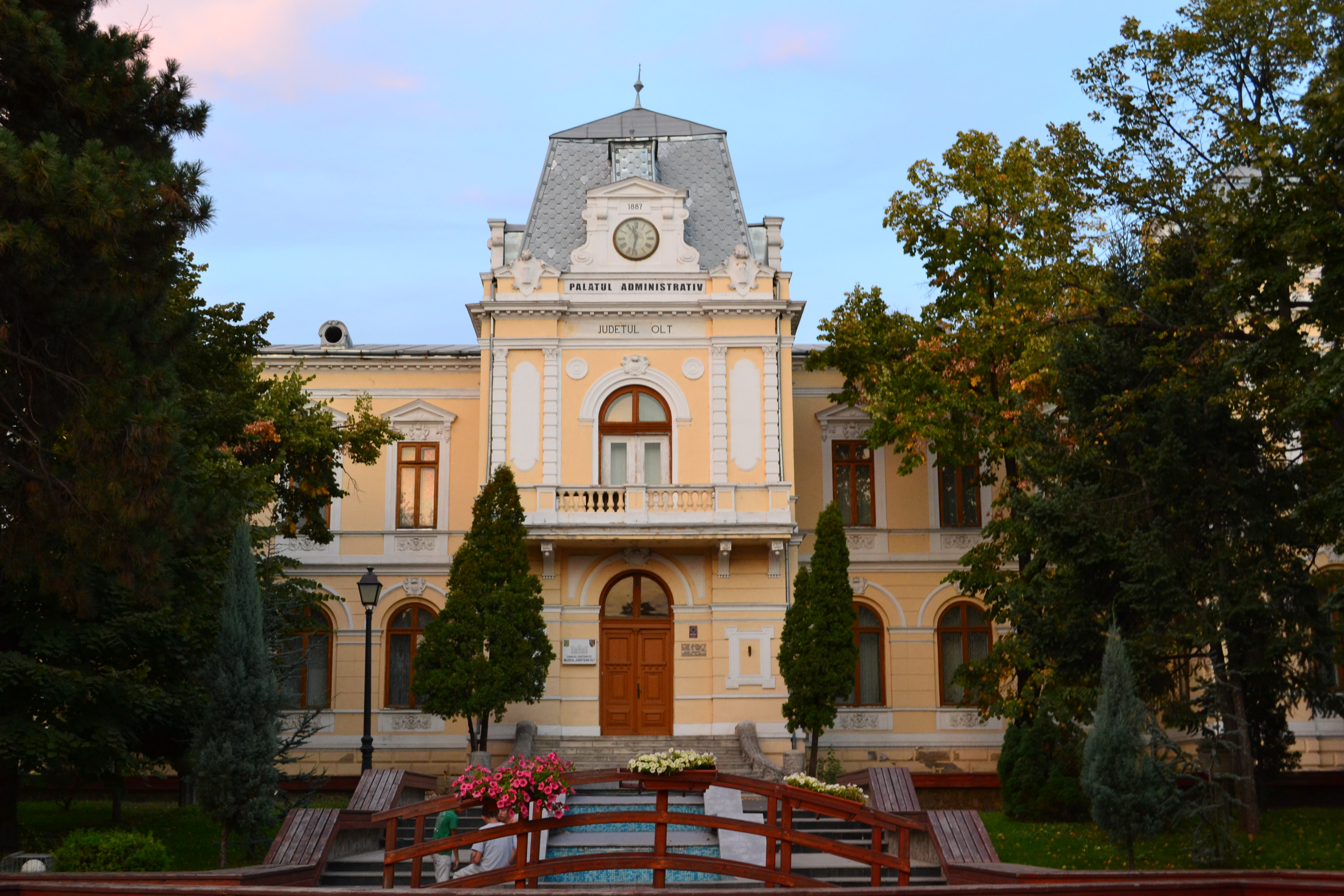
- The Olt County Prefecture's building from the interwar period, currently the Olt County Museum.

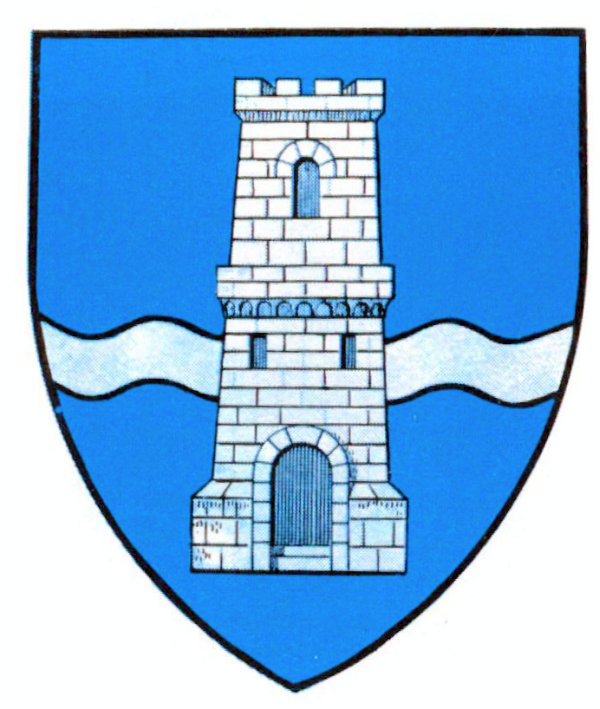
- Coat of arms

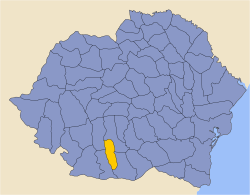
- Country: Romania
- Historic region: Muntenia
- Capital city (Reședință de județ): Slatina

Area
  - Total: 2,863 km^{2} (1,105 sq mi)

Population (1930)
  - Total: 183,595
  - Density: 64.13/km^{2} (166.1/sq mi)
- Time zone: UTC+2 (EET)
  - Summer (DST): UTC+3 (EEST)

Historically, the county was located in the southern part of Greater Romania, in the western part of the historical region of Muntenia, around and in the south of Bucharest. The county included the north-eastern part of the current Olt county, the south-western part of the present Argeș County and the north-western part of the present Teleorman County. During the interwar years, it was bordered to the north by Argeș County, to the east by the counties of Argeş and Teleorman, to the south by Teleorman County, and in the west by the counties of Romanați and Vâlcea.

=== Administration ===
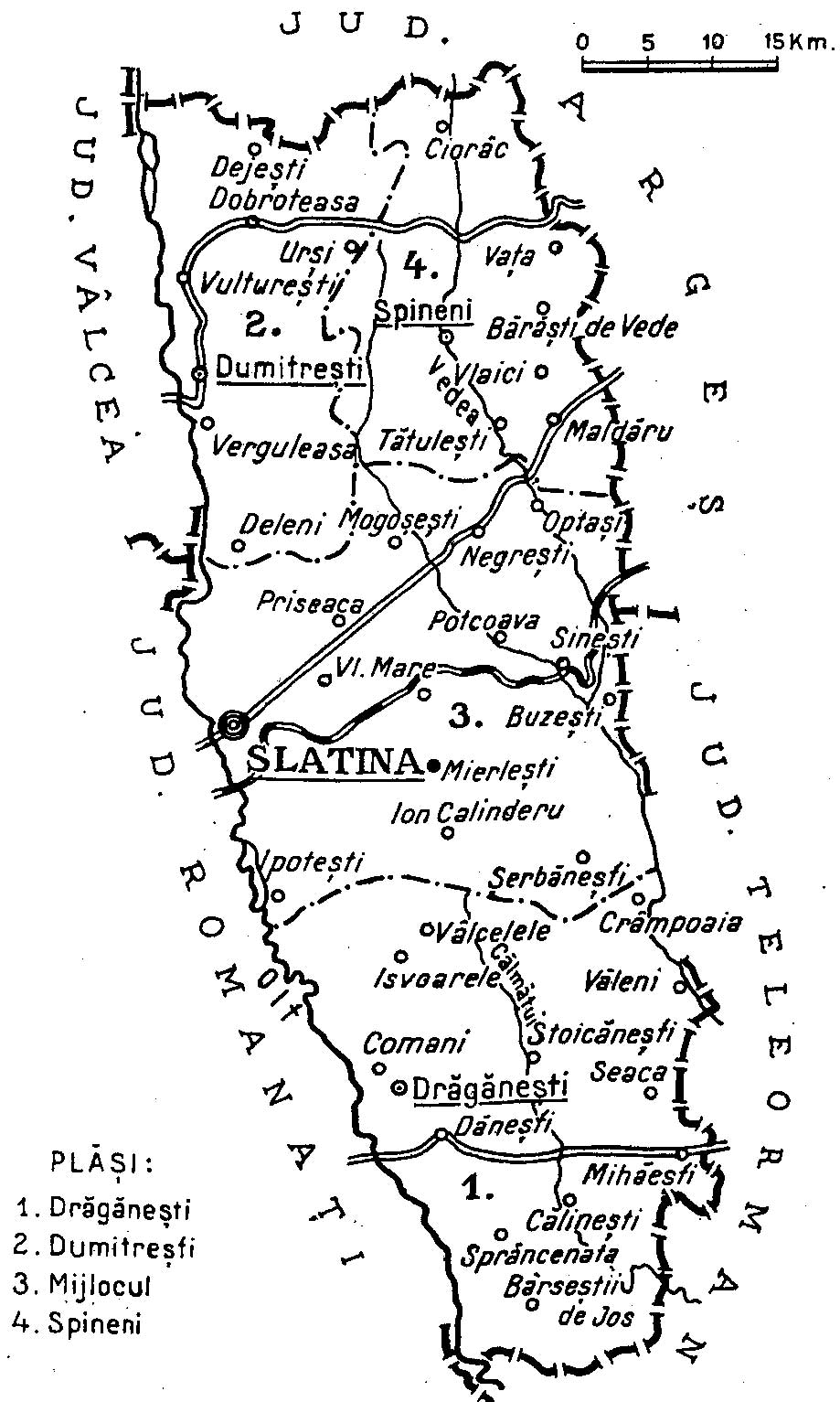
Map of Olt County as constituted in 1938.

The county originally was divided into three administrative districts (plăși):

1. Plasa Drăgănești, headquartered at Drăgănești
2. Plasa Dumitrești, headquartered at Dumitrești
3. Plasa Spineni, headquartered at Spineni

Subsequently, the county established an additional district:

4. Plasa Mijlocul, headquartered at Mijlocul

=== Population ===
According to the 1930 census data, the county population was 183,595 inhabitants, ethnically divided as follows: 98.2% Romanians, 1.2% Romanies, as well as other minorities. From the religious point of view, the population was 99.5% Eastern Orthodox, 0.2% Roman Catholic, 0.1% Jewish, as well as other minorities.

==== Urban population ====
In 1930, the county's urban population was 11,243 inhabitants, comprising 92.5% Romanians, 2.5% Hungarians, 1.5% Jews, 0.8% Germans, as well as other minorities. From the religious point of view, the urban population was composed of 94.1% Eastern Orthodox, 2.3% Roman Catholic, 1.6% Jewish, 0.9% Reformed, 0.6% Lutheran, as well as other minorities.
