= Csík (disambiguation) =

Csík may refer to:

- Csík County, part of the Kingdom of Hungary from 1876 to 1918

and to several places in Harghita County, Romania, that have the prefix as part of their Hungarian-language name:

- Bancu (Csíkbánkfalva), a village in Ciucsângeorgiu Commune
- Bârzava (Csíkborzsova), a village in Frumoasa Commune
- Ciceu (Csíkcsicsó), a commune
- Şoimeni (Csíkcsomortán), a village in Păuleni-Ciuc Commune
- Ciucani (Csíkcsekefalva), a village in Sânmartin Commune
- Dănești (Csíkdánfalva), a commune
- Delniţa (Csíkdelne), a village in Păuleni-Ciuc Commune
- Ineu (Csíkjenőfalva), a village in Cârța Commune
- Cârța (Csíkkarcfalva), a commune
- Cozmeni (Csíkkozmás), a commune
- Mădăraș (Csíkmadaras), a commune
- Siculeni (Csíkmadéfalva until 1899), a commune
- Armăşeni (Csíkménaság), a village in Ciucsângeorgiu Commune
- Leliceni (Csíkszentlélek), a commune
- Păuleni-Ciuc (Csíkpálfalva), a commune
- Racu (Csíkrákos), a commune
- Șumuleu Ciuc (Csíksomlyó), a neighborhood in Miercurea Ciuc city
- Tomești (Csíkszenttamás), a commune
- Ciucsângeorgiu (Csíkszentgyörgy), a commune
- Sântimbru (Csíkszentimre), a commune
- Sâncrăieni (Csíkszentkirály), a commune
- Leliceni (Csíkszentlélek), a commune
- Nicoleşti (Csíkszentmiklós), a village in Frumoasa Commune
- Mihăileni (Csíkszentmihály), a commune
- Sânmartin (Csíkszentmárton), a commune
- Sânsimion (Csíkszentsimon), a commune
- Tomești (Csíkszenttamás), a commune
- Frumoasa (Csíkszépvíz), a commune
- Miercurea Ciuc (Csíkszereda), a city and the county seat
- Vrabia (Csíkverebes), a village in Tușnad Commune
- Jigodin (Csíkzsögöd), part of Jigodin-Băi village in Miercurea Ciuc city

(In the Kingdom of Hungary, these were all part of Csíkszék, a Székely "seat" or settlement merged into Csík County in 1876.)

and to:

- Vărgata (Csíkfalva), a commune in Mureș County, Romania
