= Tușnad (disambiguation) =

Tușnad may refer to:

- Tușnad, a commune in Harghita County, Romania
- Băile Tușnad, a town in Harghita County, Romania
- Tușnad (river), a tributary of the Olt in Romania
