= Fișag =

River in Romania

Fișag Bancu
- Location within Romania

Location
- Country: Romania
- Counties: Harghita County
- Villages: Ciucsângeorgiu, Bancu, Cetățuia

Physical characteristics
- Mouth: Olt
  - location: Cetățuia
  - coordinates: 46.2262°N 25.8863°E
- Length: 25 km (16 mi)
- Basin size: 182 km^{2} (70 sq mi)

Basin features
- Progression: Olt→ Danube→ Black Sea
- Tributaries
  - left: Uz, Cozmeni
  - right: Toplița

The Fișag (also: Bancu, Valea Satului) is a left tributary of the river Olt in Romania. It joins the Olt near Cetățuia. Its length is 25 km (16 mi) and its basin size is 182 km^{2} (70 sq mi).
