= Cozmeni (river) =

- Location within Romania

Location
- Country: Romania
- Counties: Harghita County
- Villages: Cozmeni

Physical characteristics
- Mouth: Fișag
  - coordinates: 46.2360°N 25.9027°E
- Length: 9 km (5.6 mi)
- Basin size: 24 km^{2} (9.3 sq mi)

Basin features
- Progression: Fișag→ Olt→ Danube→ Black Sea

The Cozmeni is a left tributary of the river Fișag in Romania. It discharges into the Fișag near Cetățuia. Its length is 9 km (5.6 mi) and its basin size is 24 km^{2} (9.3 sq mi).
