= Szenttamás =

Szenttamás ("Saint Thomas" in Hungarian) may refer to:

- Szenttamás (Esztergom), former village, city part of Esztergom since 1895, named after Saint Thomas Becket
- Srbobran, town in Serbia (Szenttamás in Hungarian)
- Tomești, Harghita, village in Romania (Szenttamás or Csikszenttamás in Hungarian)
