= Ciomadul =

Volcano in Romania

- Csomád (hu)
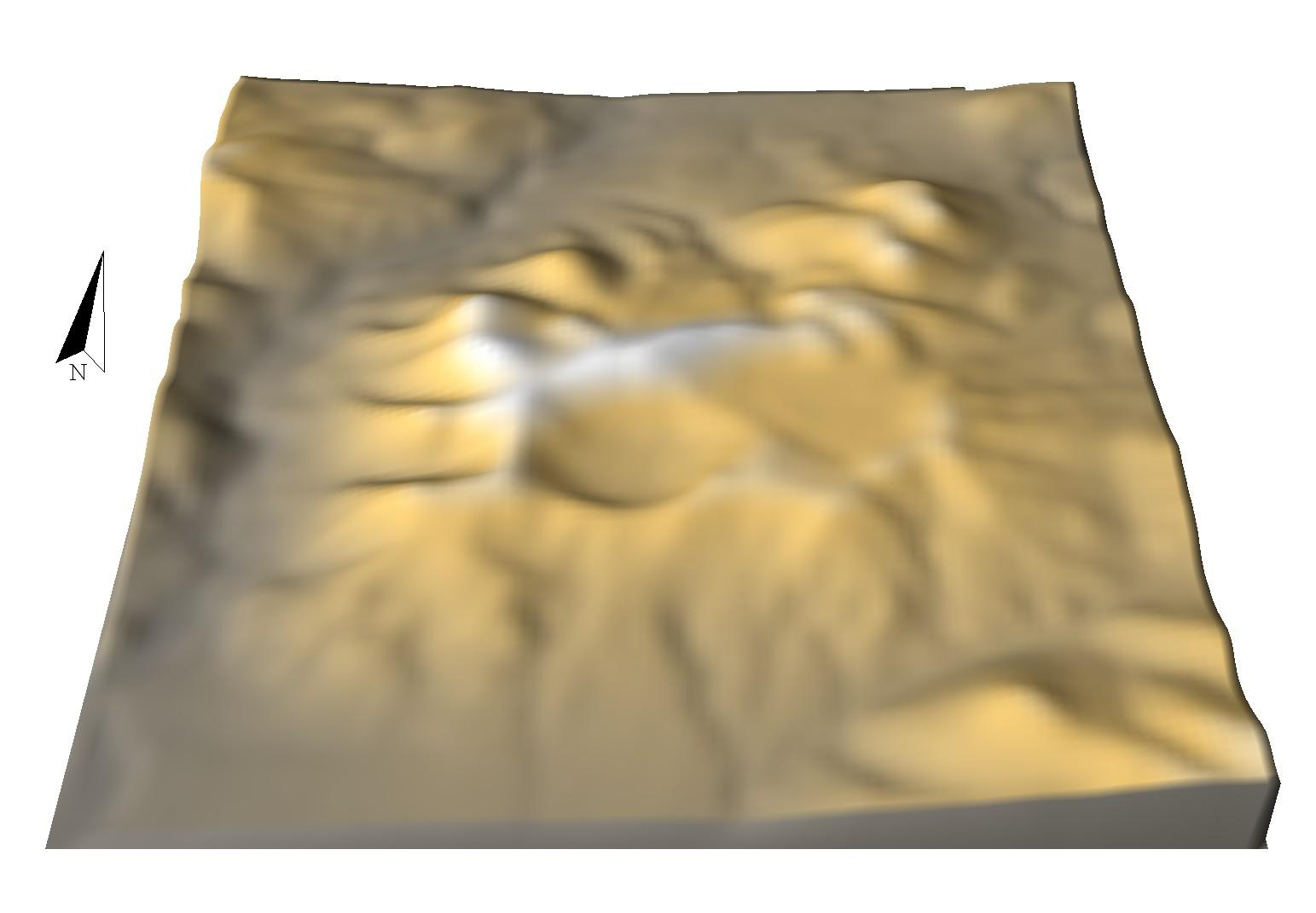
- 3D model of Ciomadul's central sector seen from the south

Highest point
- Elevation: 1,289 m (4,229 ft)
- Coordinates: 46°08′N 25°53′E

Geography
- Location within Romania
- Location: Romania, Harghita County
- Parent range: Carpathian Mountains

Geology
- Rock age: Pleistocene
- Mountain type: Lava domes
- Volcanic belt: Carpathian volcanic arc

Ciomadul (Hungarian: Csomád) is a dormant volcano in Romania. It is in the Eastern Carpathians, between the spa towns of Băile Tușnad and Balvanyos. Ciomadul lies at the southeastern end of the Carpathian volcanic chain and it is the youngest volcano of the Carpatho-Pannonian region. Ciomadul consists of several lava domes with two embedded explosion craters known as Mohoș and Sfânta Ana, the latter of which contains a crater lake, Lake Sfânta Ana. The dominant volcanic rock at Ciomadul is potassium-rich dacite.

Volcanic activity at Ciomadul commenced with effusive activity about one million years ago. Most of the volcano was constructed between 650,000 – 500,000 years ago.

Between 56,000 and 32,000 years ago explosive volcanic activity occurred at Ciomadul. Both the exact dates of the various eruptions and of the formation of the Sfânta Ana and Mohoș craters are unclear, partly because dates obtained by potassium-argon dating and other dating techniques deviate from each other. Some eruptions may have reached sub-Plinian strength, ejecting volcanic ash as far as the Black Sea.

The last eruption took place between 32,600 and 27,500 years ago. Its date is likewise unclear. Ongoing seismic and geothermal activity, and exhalations of volcanic gas and evidence of a still existing magma chamber indicate that Ciomadul is a potentially active volcano.

== Geography and geology ==
=== Regional setting ===
With the exception of Greece and Italy, the most recent volcanic activity in Continental Europe occurred between 40,000 and 6,500 years ago in Garrotxa, the Massif Central and the Vulkaneifel.

Volcanism in the region of Carpathia and Pannonia has been ongoing since 20 million years ago but has decreased during the Quaternary. No eruptions took place in the Holocene. The last volcanism occurred at Ciomadul in the last glacial age. Sparse basaltic volcanism has also taken place in the area, forming monogenetic volcanic fields.

A 700-kilometre-long (430 mi) volcanic arc lies in the Carpathians. In its southern segment, also known as the Călimani (Kelemen) – Gurghiu (Görgényi) – Harghita (Hargita) chain, volcanism has migrated between 9 and 0.22 million years ago southward, forming a c. 100-kilometre-long (62 mi) volcanic chain. Magma output progressively decreased during time, with early volcanoes being large stratovolcanoes sometimes featuring caldera-forming eruptions, while more recent activity includes monogenetic volcanoes although more precise dating and volume estimation efforts at Ciomad have found an increase of eruption rates over time.

This volcanism occurs in a setting where the collision between the Eurasian Plate and the Tisza-Dacia microplate took place, preceded by a stage of subduction involving a narrow ocean. This is part of the collision between the African Plate and the Eurasian Plate; subduction may still be underway in the area of the Carpathians. The Vrancea Zone, which is 50 kilometres (31 mi) away from Ciomadul, features ongoing earthquake activity; deep earthquakes suggest that a remnant of a slab exists beneath the Vrancea Zone. This tectonic setting may also be responsible for ongoing exhumation in the southeastern Carpathians, volcanism at Ciomadul and the Perșani volcanic field, 40 kilometres (25 mi) south of Ciomad, which was concurrently active to the older Ciomadul activity. Other theories on Ciomadul's volcanic activity imply delamination of the lithosphere or roll-back of the subduction zone.

Volcanism in this chain is calc-alkaline, yielding both andesite, dacite, and rhyolite. Three million years ago, a change in the chemistry of volcanism occurred, with an increased content of potassium in the rocks. This change in composition geographically coincided with the volcanic activity crossing a lineament known as the Trotuș line.

=== Volcano ===
3D model of the volcano

Ciomadul is located in the southeastern Carpathians, at the end of the Călimani (Kelemen) – Gurghiu (Görgényi) – Harghita (Hargita) volcanic chain, and is also known as Csomád in Hungarian. The gorge of the Olt River separates Ciomadul from the Harghita Mountains. The towns of Băile Tușnad and Bixad are close to the volcano, and a road leads up the volcano from the southeast and goes past the Mohoș swamp to Lake Sfânta Ana. The basement of the volcano is formed by flysch of Cretaceous age and by older volcanics; in some places volcanic rocks overlie fluvial deposits.

Places around Ciomadul were first mentioned in 1349; the Saxon mineralogist Johann Ehrenwert Fichtel was the first to interpret it as a volcano, in 1780. The idea that Ciomadul could be a still active volcano was first proposed in the same year on the basis of its young appearance and the release of gas. These discoveries drew scholars and visitors to the volcano and the first scientific analysis of the volcano was published just eight years later. While a publication in 1964 postulated that the tuffs of Ciomadul were reworked Pliocene volcanites, the late Pleistocene age was established soon afterwards. The volcano is the youngest volcanic centre in the Carpathians and has a more rugged appearance than the surrounding mountains.

Ciomadul is formed by a complex of lava domes and other volcanic material that form a south-tilting ridge that rises above the 700-metre-high (2,300 ft) surrounding Lower Ciuk Basin. Individual lava domes form cone-shaped hills, which reach heights of 300–400 metres (980–1,310 ft) and widths of 1–2 kilometres (0.62–1.24 mi). Individual domes include Haramul Ierbos (Fű-Haram in Hungarian), Haramul Mare (Nagy-Haram), Haramul Mic (Kis-Haram), Vf. Cetății (Vár-tető), Vf. Comloș (Komlós-tető), Vf. Surduc (Szurdok-tető) and Dealul Mare southeast from the main complex. The central cluster of domes is elliptical and tectonic faults influenced their growth. The highest point of the complex is Ciomadul Mare (Nagy-Csomád) with an altitude of 1,301 metres (4,268 ft). Some domes were later affected by erosion, explosive activity or fumarolic alteration. The whole volcanic complex covers a surface area of 80 square kilometres (31 sq mi), and is surrounded by a circular/semicircular plain made of volcanic debris.

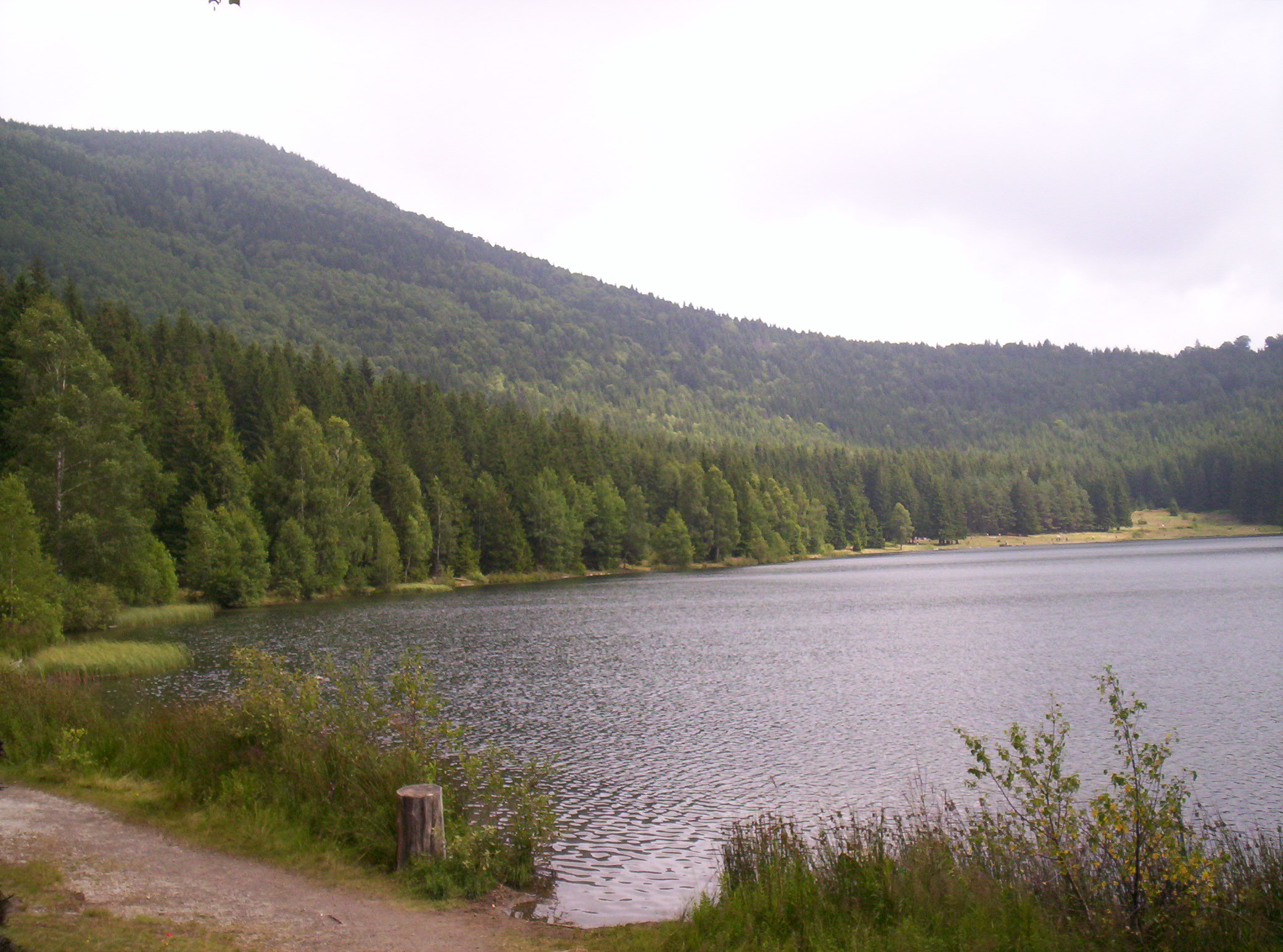
Sfânta Ana crater and lake

The lava dome complex contains two craters, named Mohoș and Sfânta Ana. They were formed in the previously existing lava domes which form the western margin of the craters, while products of explosive eruptions crop out in the east. The Sfânta Ana crater is c. 1,600 metres (5,200 ft) wide and c. 200 metres (660 ft) deep beneath the rim, comparable with the crater of El Chichón volcano in Mexico. This crater lacks a breach and is relatively unaffected by erosion. It contains a 6-metre-deep (20 ft) crater lake, which once may have been over 12 metres (39 ft) deep. This c. 189.9-square-kilometre (73.3 mi^{2}) lake is known as Lake Sfânta Ana (46°07′35″N 25°53′17″E) and lies at an altitude of 946 metres (3,104 ft); its ecosystem and environment has drawn the attention of scientists for two centuries.

The Mohoș crater lies at an altitude of 1,050 metres (3,440 ft). It is larger than Sfânta Ana with a diameter of 1.9 kilometres (1.2 mi) and not as deep with its bottom lying above sea level. It is filled with a 10-metre-thick (33 ft) and 800,000-square-metre (80 ha) Sphagnum peat bog and its rim is cut by the Sfânta Ana crater.

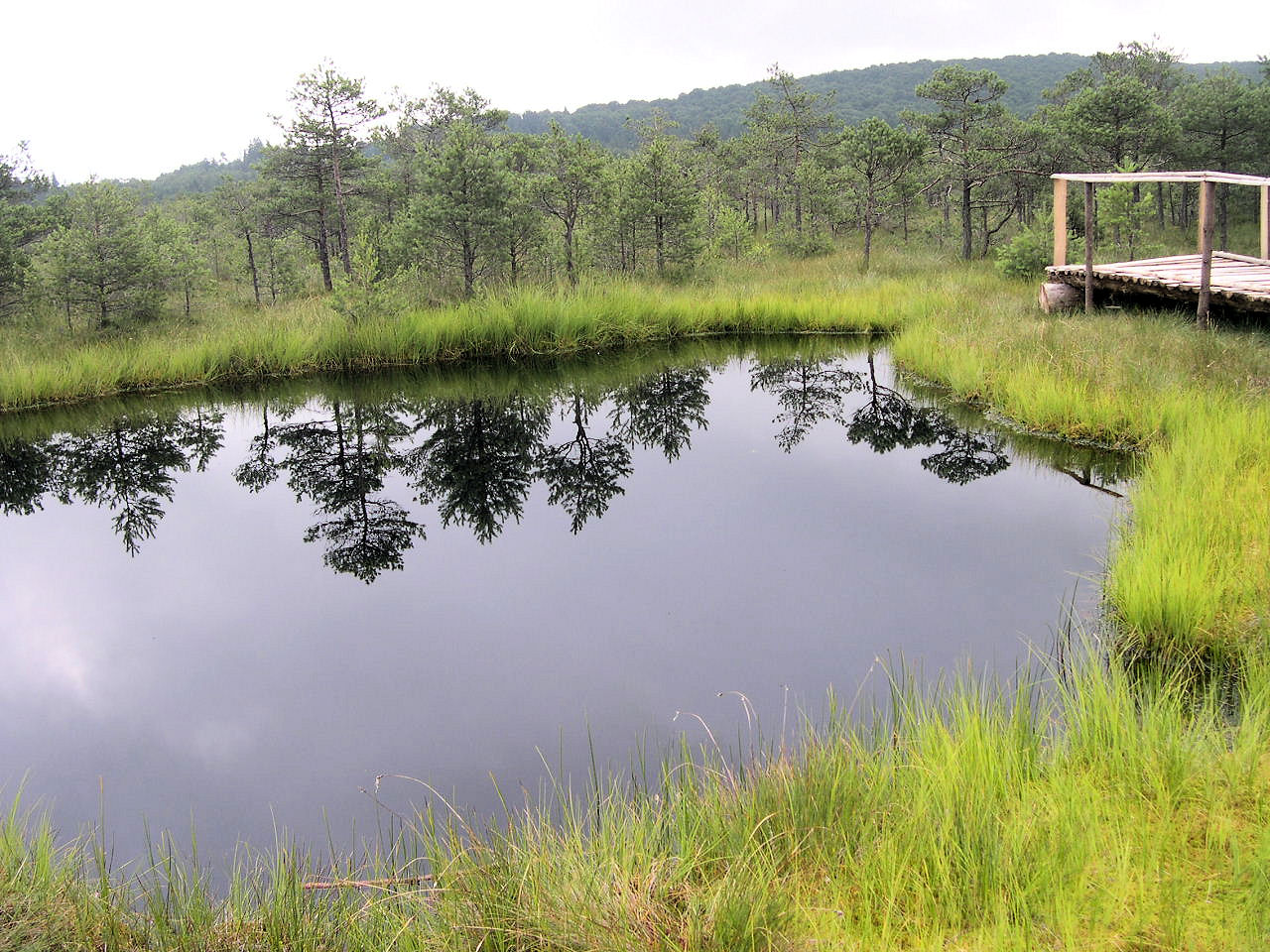
Peat bog in Mohoș crater

Unlike Sfânta Ana, the Mohoș crater has been breached by erosion, causing the formation of an outlet valley. Both craters were formed by explosive eruptions and distinguishing between the deposits of both is difficult. The existence of an even larger crater with a diameter of 2–2.5 kilometres (1.2–1.6 mi) has been suggested, encompassing both Sfânta Ana and Mohoș.

Pyroclastic flow deposits generated by Ciomadul have been found on its northeastern, southern and western slopes. They reach a distance of as much as 25 kilometres (16 mi) from the volcano. At Tușnad road, one of the flows has a thickness of c. 10 metres (33 ft). Tephra fall bed, lapilli, and surge deposits are also found, and the flow deposits contain pumice blocks. One lapilli layer, 20–23 centimetres (7.9–9.1 in) thick, from Ciomadul has been identified 40 kilometres (25 mi) east of the volcano. The whole pyroclastic formation has been subdivided into three classes known as "Early Phreatomagmatic + Plinian Activity", "Middle Plinian Activity" and "Latest Sfânta Ana Phreatomagmatic Activity". Each comprise a number of individual tephra layers that were erupted 42,000—40,000, around 31,500 and 29,000—28,000 years ago. Some of these eruptions may have dammed the Olt river; when the river returned on its course it produced lahar deposits.

Other landforms at Ciomadul include coulees and lava flows. The total volume of the complex is about 8–15 cubic kilometres (1.9–3.6 cu mi) dense rock equivalent. Drilling has identified the existence of an intrusion at a depth of 575 metres (1,886 ft). Finally, volcanic erosion products and tephra occur all over the volcanic complex and up to 350 kilometres (220 mi) east of it.

Older volcanic centres extend northwest of Ciomadul. With increasing distance they are the 2.5—1.5 million-year-old Pilisca centre, the 2.8—2.2 million-year-old Cucu centre and the 4.3—3.6 million-year-old Luci-Lazu and Șumuleu-Ciuc volcanic centres. South of Ciomadul the Murgul shoshonites were erupted 2.3—1.5 million years ago; they represent cryptodomes. Andesite lava flows from Pilisca underlie the Ciomadul deposits in some places.

=== Composition ===
The principal rock is dacite, which defines a potassium-rich calc-alkaline suite. The rocks have a porphyric appearance and contain few vesicles. They are also very rich in crystals, with the dominant phenocryst-forming minerals being biotite, hornblende and plagioclase. Less important are allanite, apatite, clinopyroxene, olivine, orthopyroxene, quartz, sphene and zircon. The groundmass contains plagioclase, pyroxene, silicon dioxide and oxides of iron and titanium. Clots formed by various felsic crystals are common. The composition of Ciomadul's rocks has been fairly constant throughout its evolution albeit with two shifts 1 million and 650,000 years before present, and this diversity of its components indicate that the genesis of Ciomadul magmas involved mixing between felsic and mafic magma. The phenocryst compositions at Ciomadul are unlike these at other volcanoes in the Carpathians. The magmas derive from the upper mantle lithosphere, which underwent metasomatic alteration.

Compositionally, the tephras of Ciomadul have been subdivided into two groups, one called Tușnad‐type and the other Bixad‐type. A large proportion of crystals in the rocks consists of antecrysts and xenocrysts, making radiometric dating of the rocks difficult. These include amphibole, biotite, feldspar and zircon. The zircons formed almost continuously over hundred thousands of years within Ciomadul's magma chamber, indicating a steady crystallization of the chamber. Differences in magma temperature, crystal content and the participation of pre-existent crystal mushes determine whether an eruption will be effusive or explosive.

The temperature of the magma chamber has been estimated to be about 700–750 °C (1,292–1,382 °F), with heating of over 200 °C (360 °F) occurring before some eruptions according to thermometry calculation. Volcanic activity was most likely triggered by the injection of basaltic magma into the felsic magma chamber before the actual eruption, as has been observed at other silicic volcanoes around the world, but the magma chamber probably kept being recharged even between eruptions. The amphiboles in the rocks formed at depths of 7–14 kilometres (4.3–8.7 mi). The magma output of Ciomadul is about 0.009 cubic kilometres per millennium (0.0022 mi^{3}/ka) while magma chamber recharge may have reached 0.00013 cubic kilometres per year (3.1×10^{−5} mi^{3}/a).

== Eruptive history ==
Ciomadul has been active for over half a million years, with the oldest activity between 1,000,000 and 750,000 years ago forming lava domes. Older estimates indicate that activity did not start before 250,000 years ago, while more recent research indicated a start of volcanism over 600,000/ 850,000 years ago. Volcanism at Ciomadul consisted mostly of the extrusion of lava domes, their collapse forming block-and-ash flows and subplinian and Vulcanian eruptions separated by long periods of rest. The volcanic history of Ciomadul has been subdivided into an effusive phase that lasted until about 440,000 years ago and an explosive phase that began 200,000 years ago during which magma output increased 30-fold and which is known as "young Ciomad". An alternative description envisages an "old Ciomadul" between 1,000,000 — 300,000 years ago and a "young Ciomad eruptive period" between 160,000 — 30,000 years ago, with the latter in turn subdivided into five stages that emplaced about 7 cubic kilometres (1.7 cu mi) of rock.

A gap of about 500,000 years separates Ciomadul from the activity of other volcanoes in the area. The two oldest dates of 1,020,000 and 850,000 years ago were obtained on peripheral lava domes. Early activity between c. 850,000 — 440,000 years ago built the southeastern domes. This effusive phase is also known as "old Ciomad", and eruptions were separated by long pauses without volcanic activity from each other. The dates obtained by potassium-argon dating are much older; there is substantial disagreement between dates obtained by potassium-argon dating or argon-argon dating on the one hand and uranium-thorium dating on the other hand at Ciomadul. These dates indicate that the formation of the central lava domes took place between 590,000 and 140,000 years ago.

Around 200,000 — 130,000 or 150,000 — 100,000 years ago a number of lava domes developed. Explosive eruptions became common only about 57,000 years ago. Between 56,000 and 32,000 years ago, explosive activity occurred at Ciomadul. That timespan coincides with the deposition of tephra from volcanoes in Italy in Europe; it is possible that tephra also came from Ciomadul. Indeed, the age of Ciomadul's last eruption overlaps with the age of the Campanian Ignimbrite.

=== Tephras ===
Ciomad has produced far-flung tephras, which reached as far as Ukraine and have been recovered from the Ursului Cave of the Perșani Mountains. Some tephra layers found in two drilling cores of the Black Sea may have originated at Ciomad but reliably distinguishing between Ciomadul tephras and these from Nisyros and Anatolian volcanoes is difficult.

The Roxolany Tephra has been found as far as Odesa, Ukraine, 350 kilometres (220 mi) away from Ciomadul. If the Roxolany Tephra was formed by the youngest eruption of Ciomadul, the youngest eruption would have occurred 29,600 calibrated radiocarbon years ago based on independent dates of the tephra. From the other point of view, the clinopyroxene‐bearing Roxolany tephra was unlikely to be derived from Ciomadul, as it differs significantly from Ciomadul typical phenocryst assemblage containing amphibole. Based on new chronostratigraphic model for the Roxolany section, supported by updated magnetostratigraphic results and compiled existing radiocarbon and optically stimulated luminescence dates, the Roxolany tephra was deposited around 143,800 years ago.

=== Recent explosive activity ===
Explosive activity may have occurred in two separate episodes, one 57,000/56,000–44,000 years ago and the other 34,000/33,000–29,000 years ago. An earlier explosive eruption about 55,900 ± 2,300 years ago may be the origin of the Mohoș crater, with another proposed potassium-argon date being c. 220,000 years ago. Mohoș crater is probably older than the Sfânta Ana crater. A phreatomagmatic deposit northeast of Mohoș was formed by an eruption of the Mohoș crater; this eruption may be the source of the "Turia type" phreatomagmatic deposits, which are dated to have occurred about 51,000 ± 4,800 years ago. In one view, a volcanically quiet period followed an effusive eruption 48,000 or 42,900 years ago named "Piscul Pietros" and lasted until 31,510 years ago, when a Plinian eruption occurred. This latter eruption deposited 0.6-metre-thick (2.0 ft) ash as far as 21 kilometres (13 mi) from the vent at one site. Alternatively, 38,900 ± 1,700 years ago a subplinian eruption occurred at Ciomadul; it may have formed the Sfânta Ana crater. This date would correspond to that of the so-called "MK-202" tephra. Piscul Pietros has been also dated to be 48,000 ± 6,000 or 60,000 ± 5,000 years old.

The age of the last eruption is controversial but probably took place about 30,000 years ago. In 1994, radiocarbon dating yielded an age of 10,700 ± 800 years Before Present from a pyroclastic flow. Later, paleosoils and other samples from the same flow were used to deduce similar ages of over 36,770, 42,650, over 35,670 and over 35,520 years before present, respectively. Thus this youngest age estimate was discarded. In 2010, further research identified two younger eruptions, one occurring 39,000 years Before Present and the other 27,500 years Before Present. Other data obtained by uranium-thorium dating indicate an age of 32,600 ± 1,000 years ago for the youngest eruption. Both of these eruptions took place at Sfânta Ana and imply a repose period between eruptions of over 10,000 years. Much older dates obtained by potassium-argon dating are not considered reliable. Alternatively, the latest eruption may have occurred at a satellite vent seeing as sedimentation of Lake Sfânta Ana has been ongoing since 26,000 years ago. These two recent eruptions were fed by different magmas, with the younger eruption coming from deeper magma chambers (5–12 kilometres (3.1–7.5 mi) versus 4 kilometres (2.5 mi)) and involving more primitive magma.

After the last eruption, the lava domes were subject to glacial weathering, such as frost shattering that produced stone runs. An 1838 document by an unknown author stated that even old legends do not record eruptive activity at Ciomadul, and there is no evidence in Lake Sfânta Ana sediments of tephra layers that might indicate more recent eruptions.

== Current status ==
Presently, Ciomadul displays seismic activity, release of carbon dioxide from bubbling pools and bogs and mofettas and anomalous heat flow reaching 85–120 watts per square metre (0.0106–0.0150 hp/sq ft). Outgassing of carbon dioxide, hydrogen sulfide and mostly abiotic methane have been found at Ciomadul, forming sulfide deposits in some caverns. The total output of carbon dioxide exceeds about 8,700 tonnes (8,600 long tons; 9,600 short tons) per year, while the output of methane amounts to 1.3 tonnes (1.3 long tons; 1.4 short tons) per year. Carbon dioxide concentrations in some places such as caverns can be high enough to become dangerous to people and animals, and is reflected in place names - such as Peștera Ucigașă (Gyilkos-barlang) which mean "killer cave" while Puturosu means "stinky" - and local legends of a "gate to hell". Former alum and sulfur mines east of Ciomadul were abandoned due to the dangers from toxic gases. The carbon dioxide is accompanied by noble gases derived from the mantle. The gases may come directly from the mantle, rather than from magma.

At depths of 5 to 27 kilometres (3.1 to 16.8 mi) and especially 9 to 21 kilometres (5.6 to 13.0 mi), a magma chamber has been identified beneath Ciomadul, based on magnetotelluric data, and several 10 cubic kilometres (2.4 cu mi) of magma may still be stored underneath Ciomadul. An alternative explanation is that there are less than a few cubic kilometres of magma. This magmatic reservoir appears to have about 5–15% of melt by volume fraction, with a vertical stratification by temperature. A deeper basaltic melt zone may also exist at a depth of around 30 kilometres (19 mi). Further, a zone of low seismic velocity has been identified with geophysical and seismic modelling in the lower crust and upper mantle beneath Ciomad, down to depths of 110 kilometres (68 mi) or 400 kilometres (250 mi).

Hydrothermal activity has been noted at Ciomadul and Tușnad-Băi, including a high temperature system at depth with temperatures exceeding 225 °C (437 °F). The Tușnad-Băi springs have temperatures of 15–23 °C (59–73 °F) and discharge salty, carbon dioxide-rich water which emerges from pyroclastic deposits. They are used in spas in the area. In one cave, autotropic bacterial biofilms have been found which subsist on the exhaled gases or the sulfur deposits.

== Future activity ==
Volcanoes are usually considered to be active if they have had eruptions during the Holocene. However, as demonstrated by the unexpected eruption of Chaiten volcano in Chile in May 2008, even long-inactive volcanoes can become active again. Such volcanoes can constitute a threat to regions with seemingly quiet volcanism. Ciomadul has had repose periods that lasted longer than the timespan elapsed since the last eruption. Zircon crystallization data imply that the magma chambers of Ciomadul were active over time spans of over 300,000 years.

Uniquely, Ciomadul is a still alive volcano in Eastern Europe and its craters have a youthful appearance. There is always the possibility of renewed volcanic activity if the magma chamber has not solidified even if there is no positive evidence of ongoing magma generation. Deep earthquake activity at Ciomadul occurs down to a depth of 70 kilometres (43 mi), indicating that the volcanic system between the magma chamber and lithospheric melts is still active. It is considered to be a potentially active volcano although the risk of impending eruptions has been greatly exaggerated by sensationalist media. Potential eruptions may be heralded by seismic swarms caused by the ascent of magma, followed by deformation of the edifice and degassing in the last weeks and hours before the eruption.

== Climate and vegetation ==
Ciomadul is located in a temperate climate zone. Rainfall reaches 800–1,000 millimetres (31–39 in), resulting in strong erosion. The annual mean temperature is 7.6 °C (45.7 °F) at Sfântu Gheorghe, the nearest meteorological station. Around Sfânta Ana, July mean temperatures are 15 °C (59 °F) and January temperatures are −5 to −6 °C (23 to 21 °F).

While some glaciation occurred in the Carpathians during the ice ages, no glacial activity is recorded at Ciomadul. The volcano was unforested at that time, with steppe and tundra vegetation comprising most of the reported flora. Drill cores from the Mohoș peat bog have been used to reconstruct the past climate and hydrology of the area.

Ciomadul is covered by beech and spruce forests. Around Lake Sfânta Ana, the vegetation consists mostly of Fagus sylvatica (common beech) and Picea abies (Norway spruce) woods. Other trees include Acer platanoides (Norway maple), Betula pendula (silver birch), Carpinus betulus (common hornbeam), Pinus sylvestris (Scots pine), Salix caprea (goat willow) and Salix cinerea (grey willow). A fen contains Carex lasiocarpa (slender sedge), Carex rostrata (bottle sedge), Lysimachia thyrsiflora (tufted loosestrife) and Sphagnum angustifolium (fine bogmoss). At Mohoș, vegetation consists of Alnus glutinosa (common alder), Betula pendula and Salix. The peat bog contains trees (Pinus sylvestris and Betula pubescens (downy birch)) and Ericaceae. The region of the volcano is a Site of Community Importance and some endangered plant species have been identified in the Mohoș bog.
