= Tușnad (river) =

- Location within Romania

Location
- Country: Romania
- Counties: Harghita County
- Villages: Lăzărești, Tușnad

Physical characteristics
- Mouth: Olt
  - location: Tușnad
  - coordinates: 46.1950°N 25.8986°E
- Length: 13 km (8.1 mi)
- Basin size: 37 km^{2} (14 sq mi)

Basin features
- Progression: Olt→ Danube→ Black Sea

The Tușnad is a left tributary of the river Olt in Romania. It discharges into the Olt in the village Tușnad. Its length is 13 km (8.1 mi) and its basin size is 37 km^{2} (14 sq mi).
