= Lapoș River =

Lapoș River may refer to:

- Lapoș River (Bicaz)
- Lapoș, a tributary of the Ciobănuș in Bacău County

== See also ==
- Lapoș
