= Cârța, Harghita =

Cârța Karcfalva, Csíkkarcfalva
- Commune
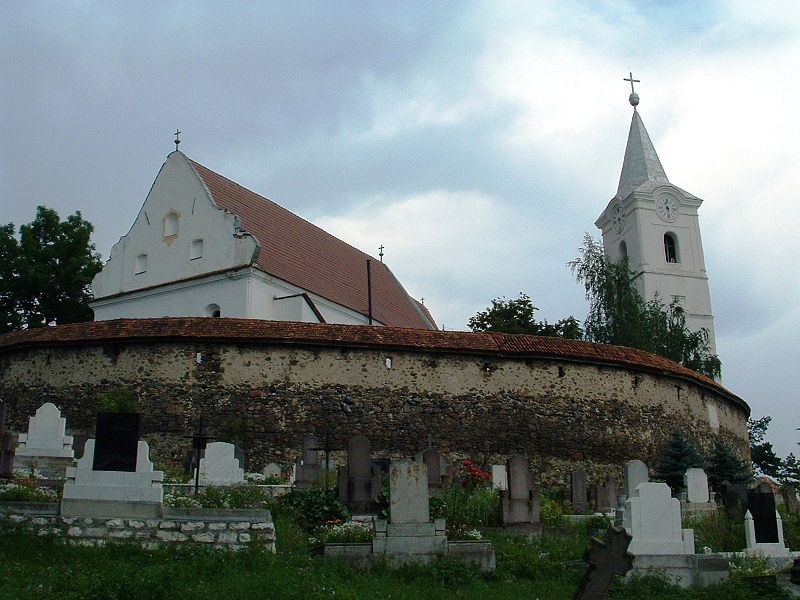
- Fortified church

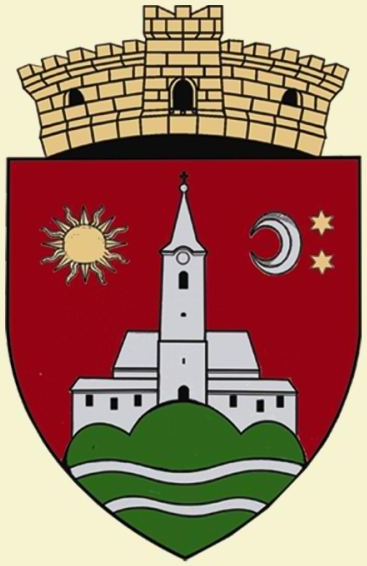
- Coat of arms

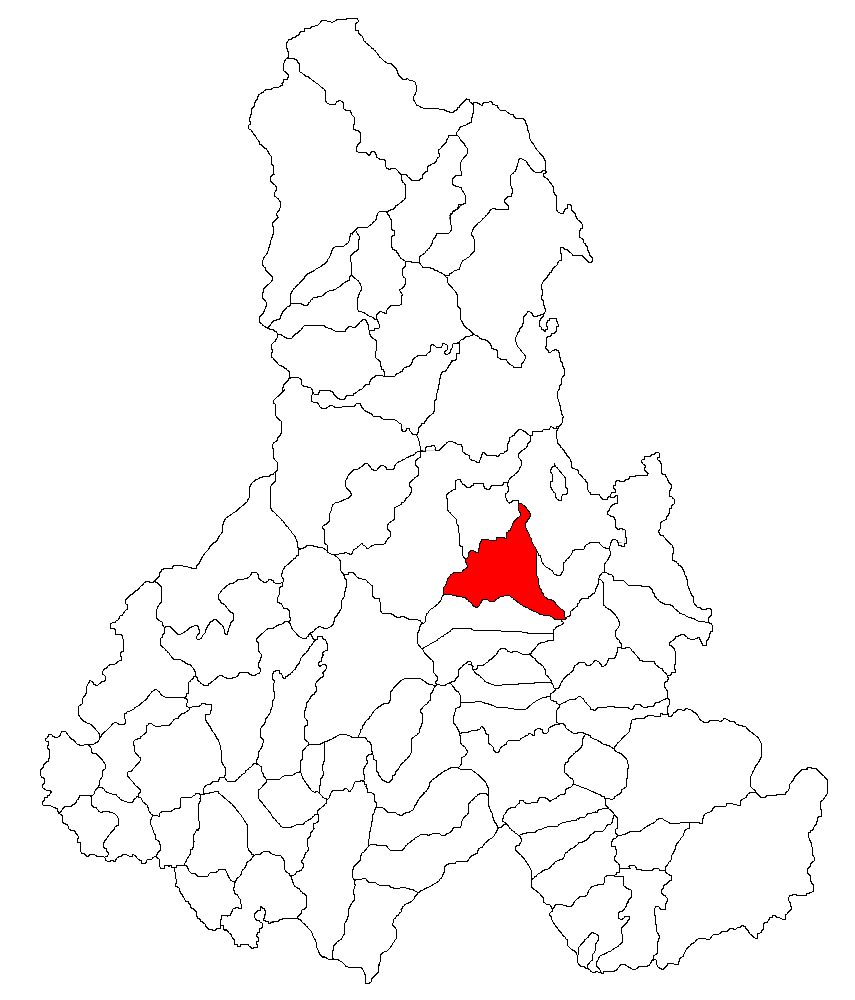
- Location in Harghita County

- Location in Romania
- Coordinates: 46°32′N 25°45′E
- Country: Romania
- County: Harghita

Government
  - Mayor (2024–2028): Tibor Gábor (UDMR)
- Area: 78.36 km^{2} (30.25 sq mi)
- Elevation: 721 m (2,365 ft)
- Population (2021-12-01): 2,527
  - Density: 32.25/km^{2} (83.52/sq mi)
- Time zone: UTC+02:00 (EET)
  - Summer (DST): UTC+03:00 (EEST)
- Postal code: 537035
- Area code: +40 266
- Vehicle reg.: HR
- Website: primariacirta.ro

Cârța (Romanian: [ˈkɨrtsa]; Hungarian: Csíkkarcfalva or Karcfalva [ˈ(t͡ʃiːk)kɒrt͡sfɒlvɒ]) is a commune in Romania, located in Harghita County. It lies in the Székely Land, an ethno-cultural region in eastern Transylvania. The commune is composed of two villages: Cârța (Karcfalva) and Ineu (Csíkjenőfalva). Tomești has been an independent commune since 2004.

== History ==
The village belonged to the Székely seat of Csíkszék, then from 1876 until 1918 to the Csík County in the Kingdom of Hungary. In the aftermath of World War I and the Hungarian–Romanian War of 1918–1919, it passed under Romanian administration; after the Treaty of Trianon of 1920, like the rest of Transylvania, it became part of the Kingdom of Romania. During the interwar period, the village fell within Ciuc County. In 1940, the Second Vienna Award granted Northern Transylvania to Hungary and the village was held by Hungary until 1944. After Soviet occupation, the Romanian administration returned and the village became officially part of Romania in March 1945. Between 1952 and 1960, the commune fell within the Magyar Autonomous Region, between 1960 and 1968 the Mureș-Magyar Autonomous Region. In 1968, the region was abolished, and since then, the commune has been part of Harghita County.

== Demographics ==
At the 2021 census, the commune had a population of 2,527; out of them, 98% were Hungarian and 0.7% were Romanian. 97% of the commune population are Roman Catholic, 0.59% are Reformed and 0.8% are Orthodox.

== Landmarks ==
- Its Roman Catholic church dedicated to honour of Virgin Mary was built around 1448 by rebuilding an older church from donation of John Hunyadi. It was altered in 1720, 1796, and in 1922. Its fortified walls were built in the late 18th, early 19th centuries. The design of the defense corridors is unique in the Székely Land. The church tower was heightened in 1720 and covered with tin sheets in 1850. A great number of pagan ritual objects were found here in 1796 when the church was being altered.
- Madicsa, a village notable for its mineral water source. It lies 4.4 km (2.7 mi) west of the village. There is a mineral water bath in the village.

== Natives ==
- Albert-László Barabási, physicist
- Hunor Kelemen, politician and writer

== Twinnings ==
- (Hungary) Helvécia
