= Cozmeni =

Cozmeni Csíkkozmás
- Commune
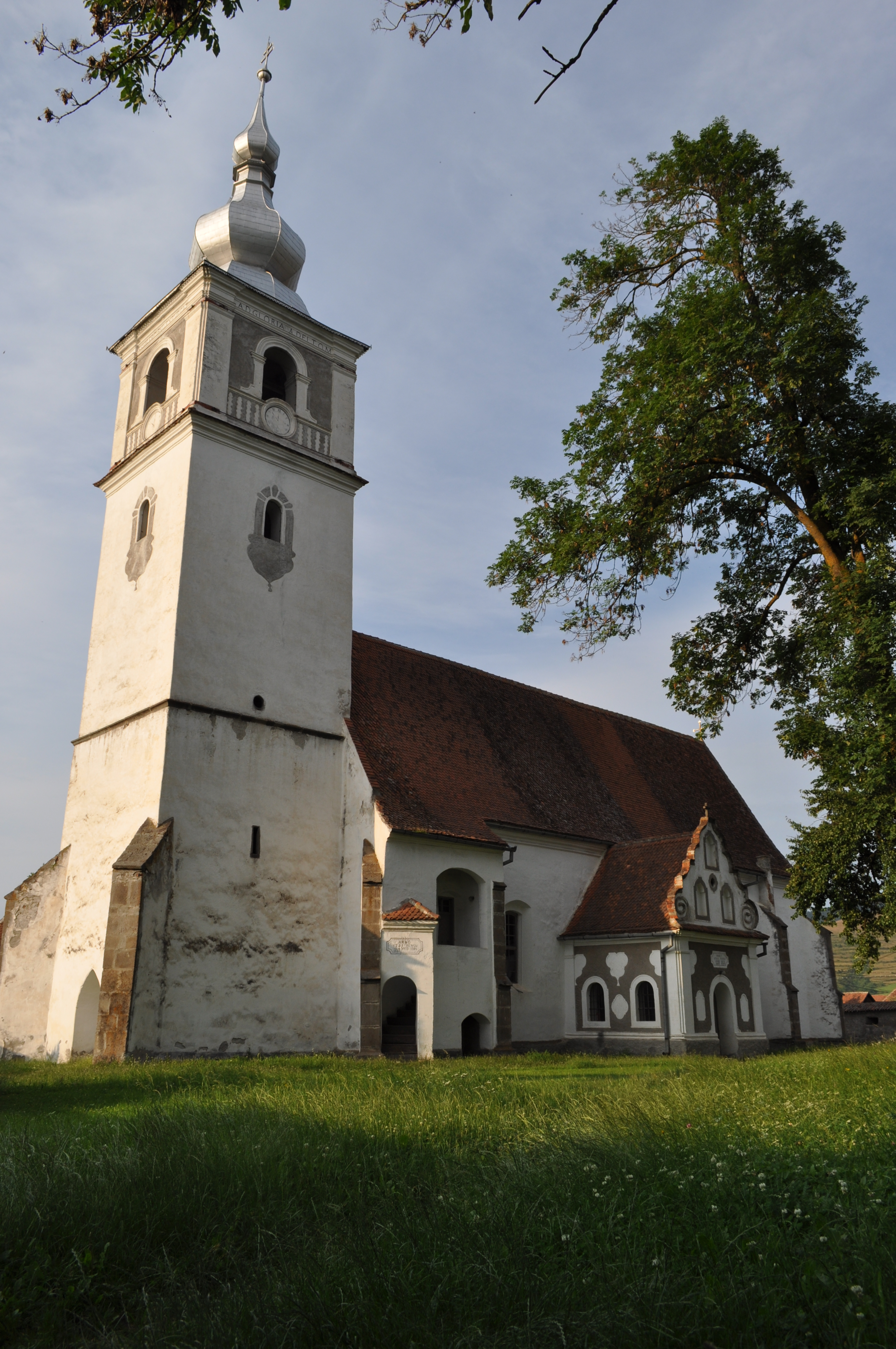
- Catholic church in Cozmeni

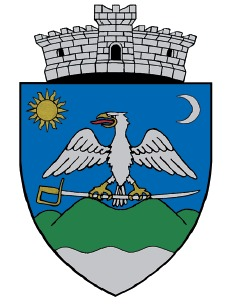
- Coat of arms

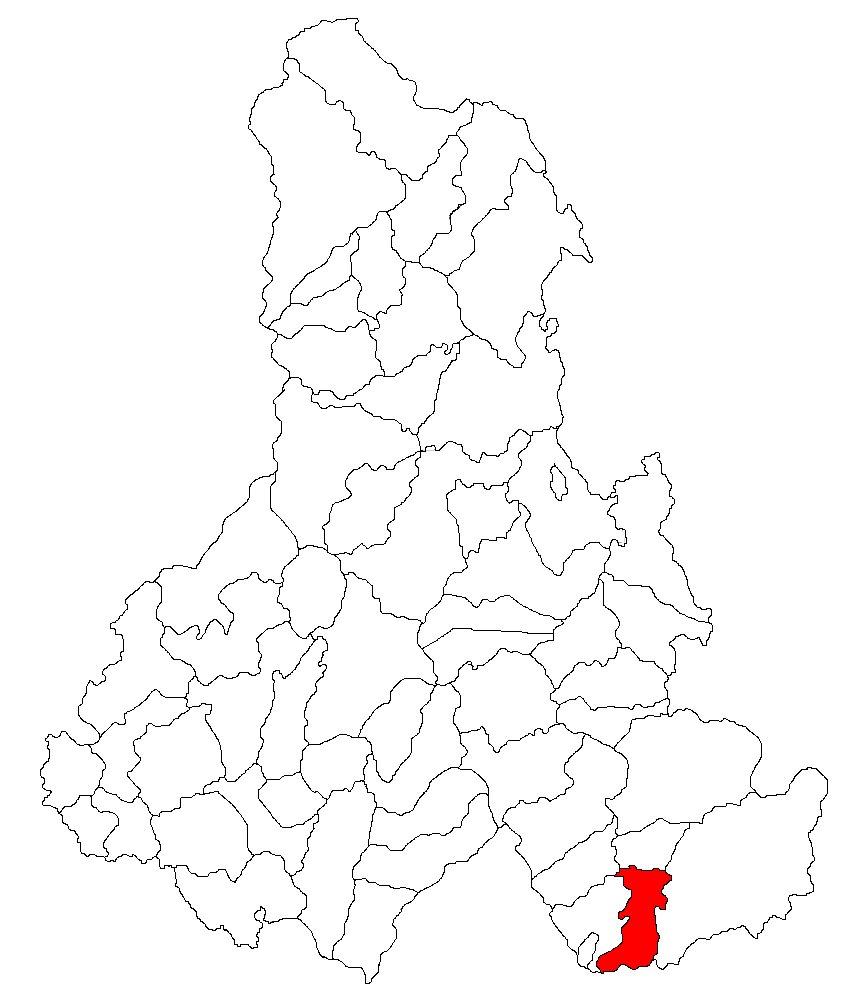
- Location in Harghita County

- Location in Romania
- Coordinates: 46°13′37″N 25°56′26″E
- Country: Romania
- County: Harghita

Government
  - Mayor (2020–2024): László Szántó (UDMR)
- Area: 70.5 km^{2} (27.2 sq mi)
- Elevation: 674 m (2,211 ft)
- Population (2021-12-01): 2,125
  - Density: 30.1/km^{2} (78.1/sq mi)
- Time zone: UTC+02:00 (EET)
  - Summer (DST): UTC+03:00 (EEST)
- Postal code: 537065
- Area code: +40 266
- Vehicle reg.: HR
- Website: cozmeni.consloc.ro

Cozmeni (Romanian: [kozˈmenʲ]; Hungarian: Csíkkozmás, IPA: [ˈt͡ʃiːkkozmaːʃ]) is a commune in Harghita County, Romania. It lies in the Székely Land, an ethno-cultural region in eastern Transylvania, and is composed of two villages, Cozmeni and Lăzărești (Lázárfalva).

== Location ==
The commune is located in the Ciuc Depression, at the southern edge of Harghita County, on the border with Covasna County. It neighbors the following communes: to the east Plăieșii de Jos, to the west Tușnad, to the north Sânmartin, and to the south Malnaș and Turia. The county capital, Miercurea Ciuc, is 21 kilometres (13 mi) to the north on European route E578. The Olt River flows from north to south at less than 5 kilometres (3.1 mi) to the west of Cozmeni, while Lake Sfânta Ana (the only volcanic crater lake in Romania) is about 16 kilometres (9.9 mi) to the south-west.

== History ==
The villages belonged to the Csíkszék district until the administrative reform of Transylvania in 1876, when they fell within Udvarhely County in the Kingdom of Hungary. In the immediate aftermath of World War I, during the Hungarian–Romanian War (1918–1919), the area passed under Romanian administration. By the terms of the Treaty of Trianon of 1920, it became part of the Kingdom of Romania, and the villages fell within Ciuc County during the interwar period.

As a result of the Second Vienna Award of August 1940, the region became part of Hungary until the Romanian Army and the Red Army entered the area in September 1944. After Soviet occupation, the Romanian administration returned in March 1945, and the commune became again officially part of Romania in 1947. Between 1952 and 1960, the commune fell within the Magyar Autonomous Region, and between 1960 and 1968 within the Mureș-Magyar Autonomous Region. In 1968, the region was abolished, and since then, the commune has been part of Harghita County. Formerly part of Sânmartin (Csíkszentmárton) commune, the two villages broke off in 2004.

== Demographics ==
The commune has an absolute Székely (Hungarian) majority. According to the 2011 census, the commune had a population of 2,089, of which 96.07% or 2,007 were Hungarians. At the 2021 census, Cozmeni had 2,125 inhabitants; of those, 87.67% were Hungarians.

== Twinning ==
(Hungary) Öttömös (Hungary) Daruszentmiklós
