= Ferenc Márton =

Hungarian artist (1884–1940)

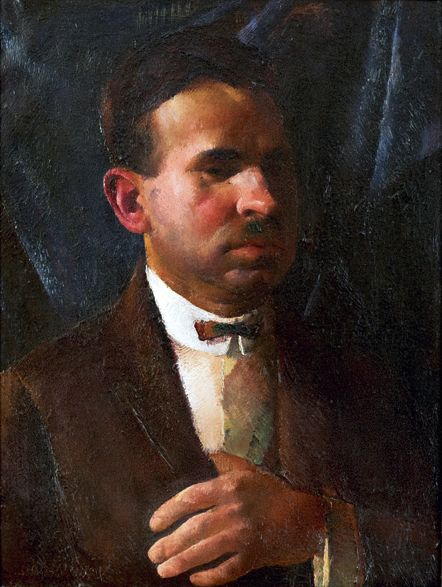
Portrait of Márton by Vilmos Aba-Novák

Ferenc Márton (15 December 1884 – 8 June 1940) was a Hungarian painter and graphic artist born in Csíkszentgyörgy (now Ciucsângeorgiu, Romania). He was a student of Bertalan Székely and the teacher of Adrienn Henczné Deák.

== Biography ==
Ferenc Márton was a disciple of Bertalan Székely and László Hegedűs. In 1908 he won the third prize of a poster competition. He became known primarily for his illustrations in Érdekes Újság. He was the portraitist of the Magyarság newspaper and between the two world wars a collaborator of the far-right side newspaper Új Magyarság. He also made mosaic and art monument projects and sculptures. His disciple was Adrienn Henczné Deák. He died in Budapest.
