= Bálványos Free Summer University and Student Camp =

Bálványos Free Summer University and Student Camp (Tusványos)
- Genre: Public event, free university, festival
- Dates: Annually end of July
- Locations: Băile Tușnad (Hungarian: Tusnádfürdő), Transylvania, Romania
- Coordinates: 46.1469°N 25.8605°E
- Years active: Since 1990
- Founders: David Campanale; Zsolt Németh; Tibor T Toró; Zsolt Szilágyi
- Website: http://www.tusvanyos.ro

The Bálványos Free Summer University and Student Camp (Hungarian: Bálványosi Nyári Szabadegyetem és Diáktábor; Romanian: Universitatea de Vară și Tabăra Studențească „Bálványos”; commonly known as the Tusványos Festival or just Tusványos) is a large-scale intellectual workshop of the Carpathian Basin held annually in Băile Tușnad, Romania (Hungarian: Tusnádfürdő). It was originally intended to promote cross-border co-operation, Romanian-Hungarian dialogue and cultural Hungarian-Hungarian political exchange. Besides the political and public themes, there is also the opportunity to relax and have fun and to participate in sporting and cultural events or visit concerts of Hungarian and Transylvanian Hungarian ensembles.

== History ==
The first edition was held in 1990 at Balvanyos, with the intention to promote dialogue between Romanians, Hungarians from Romania, and Hungarians from Hungary. The early camps were attended by several high-ranking politicians both from Romania (such as Emil Constantinescu, Traian Băsescu, Adrian Severin) and Hungary, and it was well received by both communities.

In 1997, the event was moved from Balvanyos to Tușnad (hence the Hungarian informal name Tusványos). Around 2000, it started turning from a political workshop into a student summer camp; some critics consider that to have a negative effect on the event. Around 2010, a new transformation took place: the Viktor Orbán regime from Hungary became heavily involved by using the summer university to exhibit the politics of Fidesz. The Romanian media became critical and the Romanian participation diminished. Many politicians refused invitations for the fear of being stigmatised and disapproved of the event because they considered that used to be a dialogue has turned instead into a monologue by the Hungarian side.
