= Sânmartin, Harghita =

Sânmartin Csíkszentmárton
- Commune
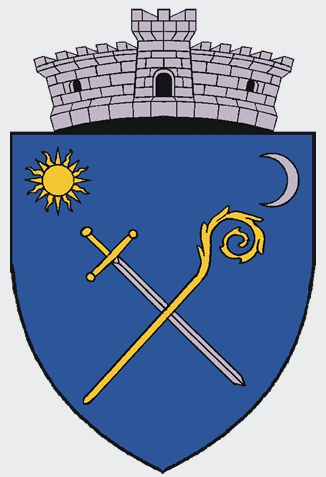
- Coat of arms

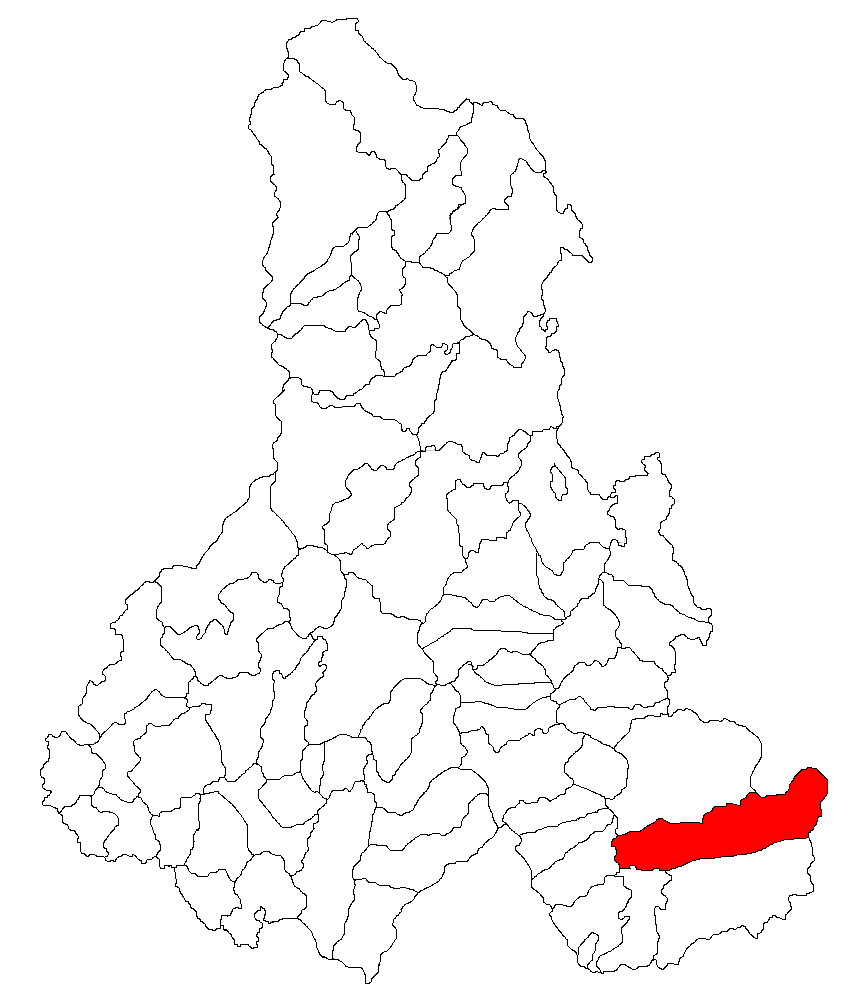
- Location in Harghita County

- Location in Romania
- Coordinates: 46°16′00″N 25°56′09″E
- Country: Romania
- County: Harghita

Government
  - Mayor (2020–2024): Sándor Birtalan (UDMR)
- Area: 41.64 km^{2} (16.08 sq mi)
- Population (2021-12-01): 2,227
  - Density: 53.48/km^{2} (138.5/sq mi)
- Time zone: UTC+02:00 (EET)
  - Summer (DST): UTC+03:00 (EEST)
- Postal code: 537280
- Area code: +(40) 266
- Vehicle reg.: HR
- Website: www.csikszentmarton.ro

Sânmartin (Hungarian: Csíkszentmárton, Hungarian pronunciation: [ˈtʃiːksɛntmaːrton], meaning "St. Martin of Csík") is a commune in Harghita County, Romania. It lies in Székely Land, an ethno-cultural region in eastern Transylvania.

The commune is composed of three villages: Ciucani (Csíkcsekefalva), Sânmartin, and Valea Uzului (Uzvölgye). Cozmeni (Csíkkozmás) along with the village of Lăzărești (Lázárfalva) have formed an independent commune since 2002.

== History ==
Székely runic script from 1501 found in Sânmartin

The villages belonged to the Székely seat of Csíkszék until the administrative reform of Transylvania in 1876, when they fell within Csík County in the Kingdom of Hungary. After the Treaty of Trianon of 1920, they became part of Romania and fell within Ciuc County during the interwar period. In 1940, the second Vienna Award granted the Northern Transylvania to Hungary and the villages were held by Hungary until 1944. After Soviet occupation, the Romanian administration returned and the commune became officially part of Romania in 1947. Between 1952 and 1960, the commune fell within the Magyar Autonomous Region, between 1960 and 1968 the Mureș-Magyar Autonomous Region. In 1968, the province was abolished, and since then, the commune has been part of Harghita County.

== Demographics ==
Historical population
Year	Pop.	±%
1850	2,196	—
1920	2,410	+9.7%
1941	2,660	+10.4%
1966	2,583	−2.9%
2002	2,348	−9.1%
2011	2,322	−1.1%
2021	2,227	−4.1%
Source: INS, Census data

The commune has an absolute Hungarian Székely majority. According to the 2011 census, it had a population of 2,308; of those, 98.83% or 2,281 were Hungarians. At the 2021 census, Sânmartin had 2,227 inhabitants, 95.64% of which were Hungarians.

== Economy ==
The size of the arable land is 1,109 ha (2,740 acres), of which 526 ha are cultivated by the agricultural company Burgabotek MT. Pasture of an area of 474 ha belong to the commonages 'Csekefalva' and 'Aklós'; 1,295 ha of reaper is owned by individual farmers. The area of forest is 1,162 ha, of which 8 ha belong to individuals while the remaining parts belong to commonages.

Potato, grain - wheat, barley, rye - and sugar beet is grown by individual farmers and an agricultural association. Fodder is produced in private businesses, likewise, stock breeding is dealt with by individual farmers, cattle, swine, sheep, goats being kept in the village.

The most important branch of industrial activity is timber-industry, including logging and processing. Currently, four sawmills operate in the village and the production is exported to several European countries. The sawmills provide more than 100 jobs for locals.

== Twinnings ==
The commune is twinned with:

- Kenderes, Hungary
- Mórahalom, Hungary
- Zalahaláp, Hungary
- Sülysáp, Hungary
