= Ciobănuș =

River in Romania

- Location within Romania

Location
- Country: Romania
- Counties: Harghita, Bacău
- Villages: Ciobăniș, Ciobănuș

Physical characteristics
- Source: Ciuc Mountains
- Mouth: Trotuș
  - location: Ciobănuș
  - coordinates: 46.4445°N 26.3372°E
- Length: 33 km (21 mi)
- Basin size: 136 km^{2} (53 sq mi)

Basin features
- Progression: Trotuș→ Siret→ Danube→ Black Sea
- Tributaries
  - right: Lovaș, Tulburea, Lapoș

The Ciobănuș is a right tributary of the river Trotuș in Romania. Its source is in the Ciuc Mountains, northeast of the city Miercurea Ciuc. It discharges into the Trotuș in the village Ciobănuș. Its length is 33 km (21 mi) and its basin size is 136 km^{2} (53 sq mi).
