= Ciucsângeorgiu =

Ciucsângeorgiu Csíkszentgyörgy
- Commune
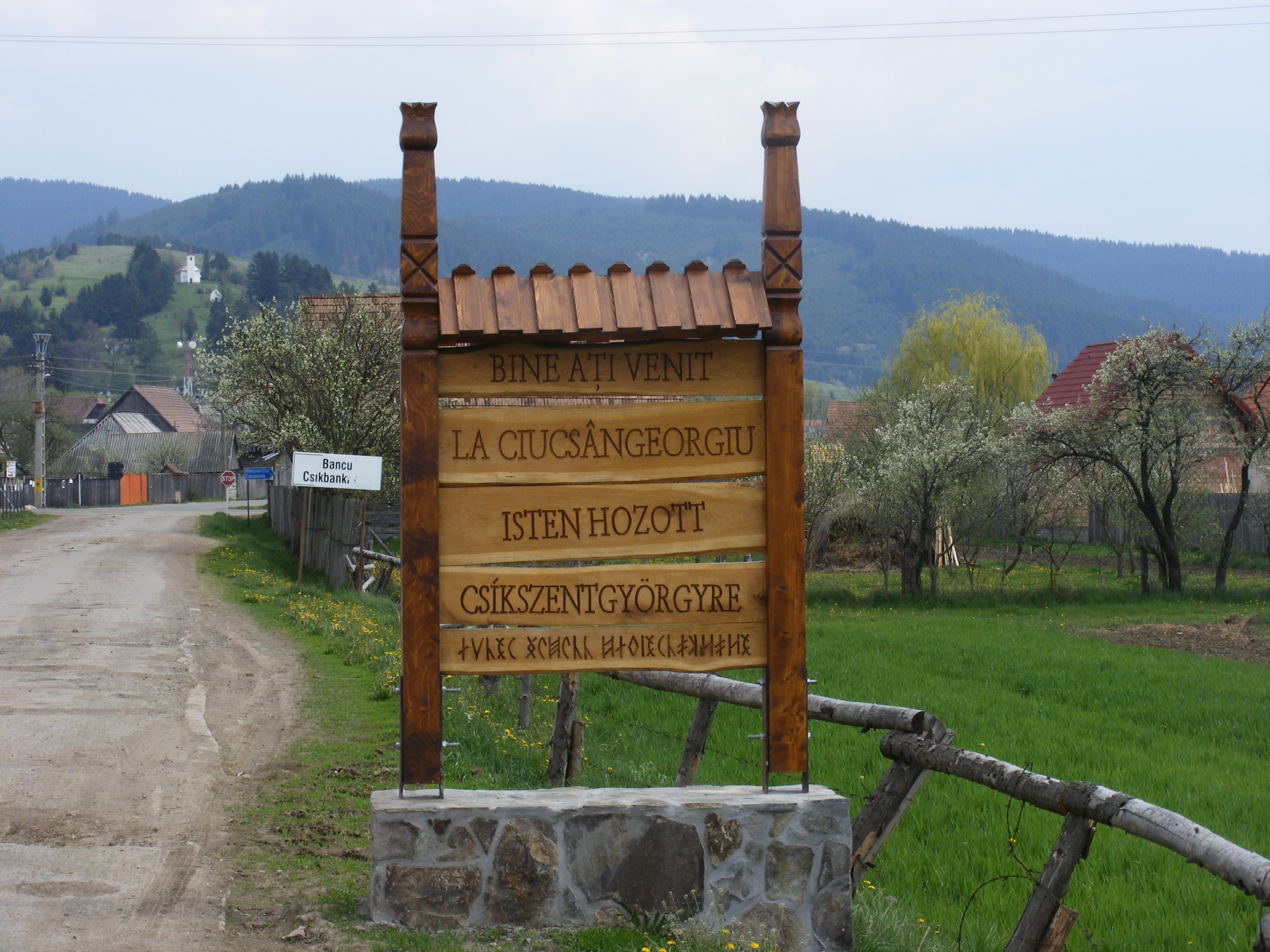

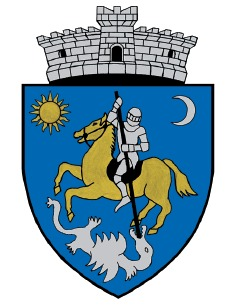
- Coat of arms

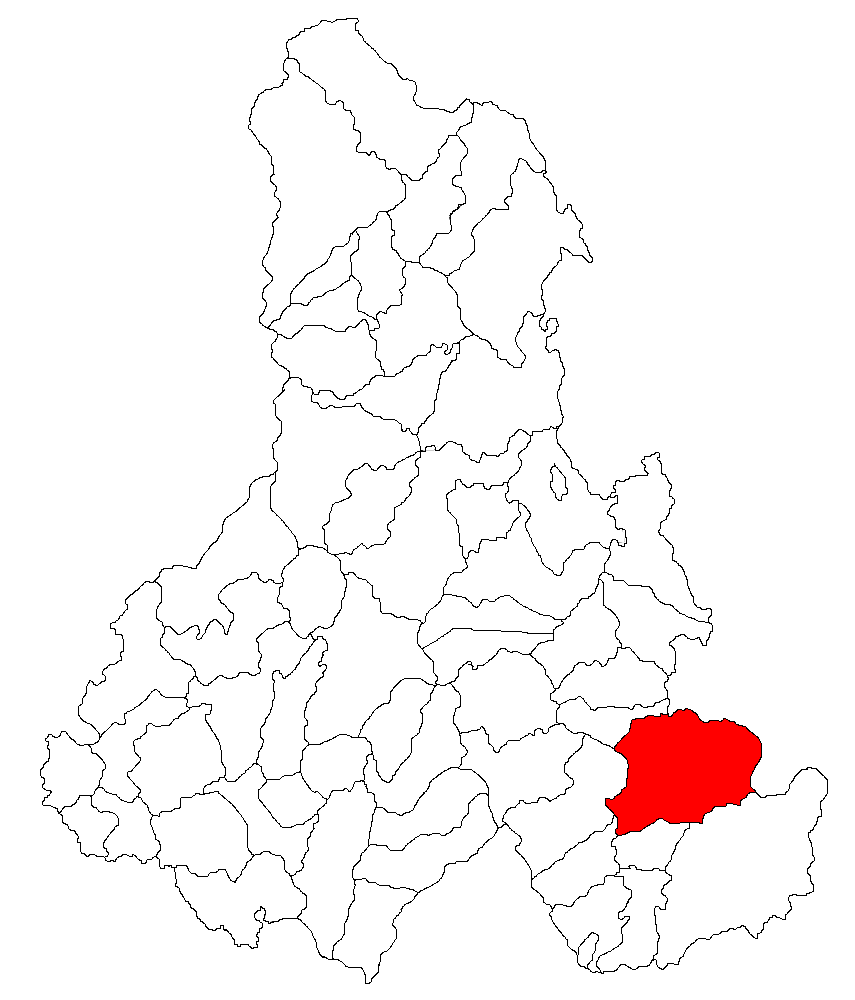
- Location in Harghita County

- Location in Romania
- Coordinates: 46°19′N 25°57′E
- Country: Romania
- County: Harghita

Government
  - Mayor (2024–2028): Zsófia Réti (UDMR)
- Area: 240.72 km^{2} (92.94 sq mi)
- Elevation: 743 m (2,438 ft)
- Population (2021-12-01): 4,876
  - Density: 20.26/km^{2} (52.46/sq mi)
- Time zone: UTC+02:00 (EET)
  - Summer (DST): UTC+03:00 (EEST)
- Postal code: 537040
- Area code: +(40) 266
- Vehicle reg.: HR
- Website: www.csikszentgyorgy.eu

Ciucsângeorgiu (Hungarian: Csíkszentgyörgy [ˈt͡ʃiːksɛɲɟørɟ]) is a commune in Harghita County, Romania. It is composed of nine villages: Armășeni (Csíkménaság), Armășenii Noi (Ménaságújfalu), Bancu (Csíkbánkfalva), Ciobăniș (Csobányos), Ciucsângeorgiu, Cotormani (Kotormány), Eghersec (Egerszék), Ghiurche (Gyürke), and Potiond (Pottyond).

== Geography ==
The commune lies in the Székely Land, an ethno-cultural region in eastern Transylvania. It is situated in the foothills of the Ciuc Mountains, at an altitude of 743 m (2,438 ft), on the banks of the rivers Ciobănuș and Uz. Ciucsângeorgiu is located in the southeastern part of Harghita County, 15 km (9.3 mi) from the county seat, Miercurea Ciuc, on the border with Bacău County.

== History ==
The village formed part of the Székely seat of Csíkszék, then from 1876 until 1918 to Csík County in the Kingdom of Hungary. In the aftermath of World War I and the Hungarian–Romanian War of 1918–1919, it passed under Romanian administration; after the Treaty of Trianon of 1920, like the rest of Transylvania, it became part of the Kingdom of Romania. During the interwar period, Ciucsângeorgiu fell within plasa Sânmărtin in Ciuc County. In 1940, the Second Vienna Award granted Northern Transylvania to Hungary and the commune was held by Hungary until September 1944. The territory of Northern Transylvania remained under Soviet military administration until March 9, 1945, after which it became again part of Romania. Between 1952 and 1960, the commune fell within the Magyar Autonomous Region, between 1960 and 1968 the Mureș-Magyar Autonomous Region. In 1968, the region was abolished, and since then, the commune has been part of Harghita County.

== Demographics ==
At the 2011 census, the commune had a population of 4,839; out of them, 96% were Hungarian, 1.3% Roma, and 0.4% Romanians. 94% of the commune population were Roman Catholic, 1.6% Pentecostal, 0.5% Reformed, and 0.4% Orthodox. At the 2021 census, Ciucsângeorgiu had a population of 4,876; of those, 93.21% were Hungarians.

== Natives ==
- Ferenc Márton (1884 – 1940), Hungarian painter and graphic artist
