= Tomești, Harghita =

Tomești Csíkszenttamás
- Commune
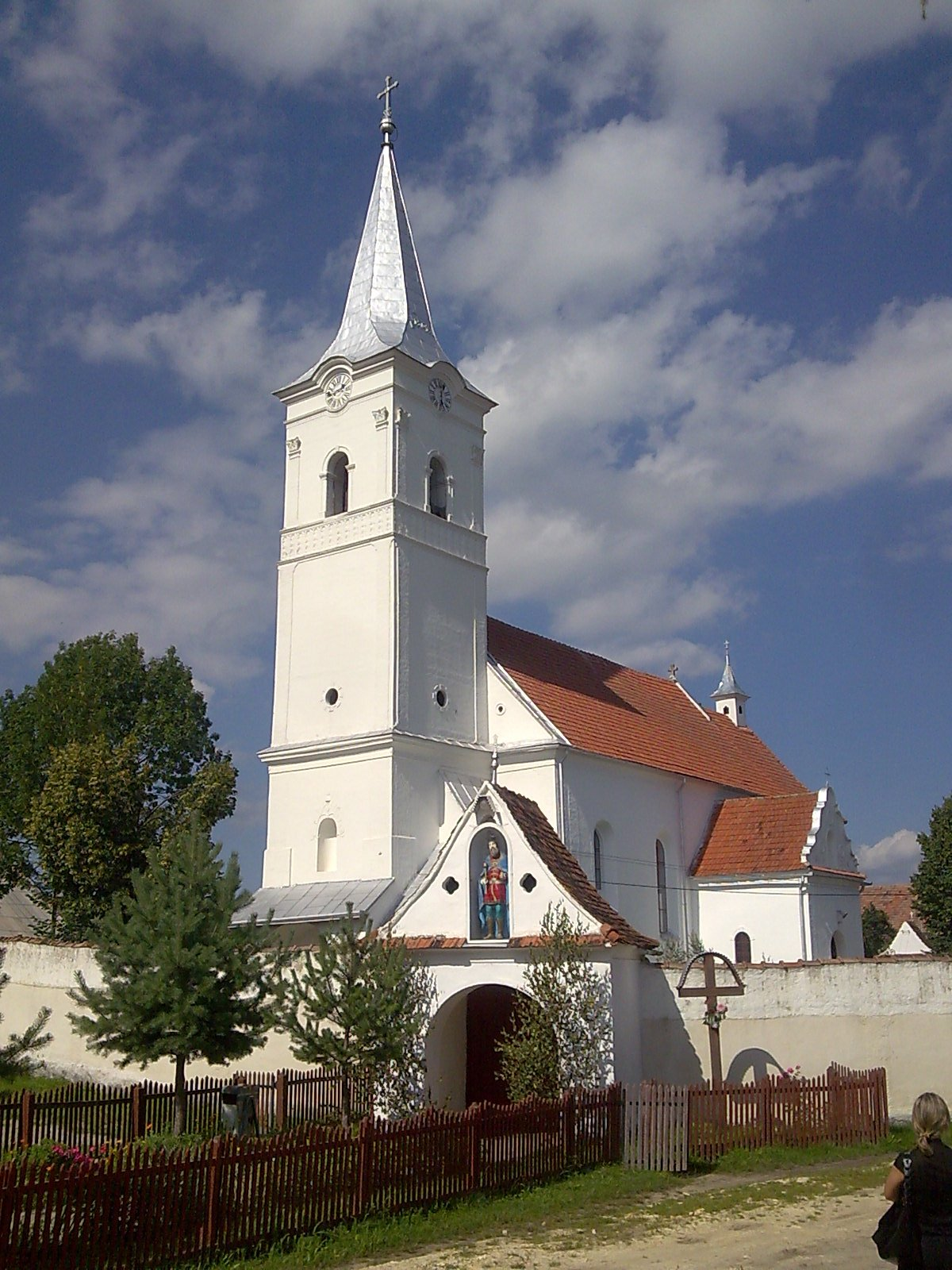
- Roman Catholic church

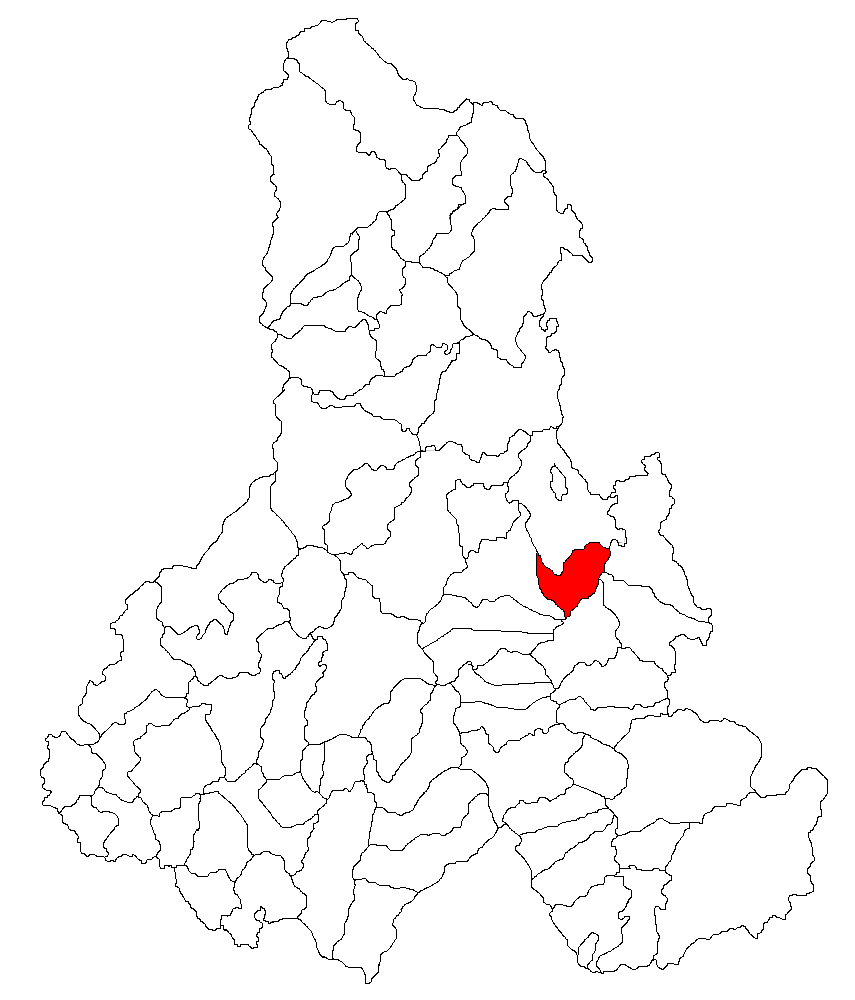
- Location in Harghita County

- Location in Romania
- Coordinates: 46°33′N 25°47′E
- Country: Romania
- County: Harghita

Government
  - Mayor (2020–2024): Róbert Kedves (UDMR)
- Population (2021-12-01): 2,430
- Time zone: UTC+02:00 (EET)
  - Summer (DST): UTC+03:00 (EEST)
- Postal code: 537037
- Area code: +40 266
- Vehicle reg.: HR
- Website: www.csikszenttamas.ro

Tomești (Hungarian: Csíkszenttamás, or colloquially Szenttamás, Hungarian pronunciation: [ˈtʃiːksɛntɒmaːʃ]) is a commune in Harghita County, Romania. It lies in the Székely Land, an ethno-cultural region in eastern Transylvania. It is named after Saint Thomas. The commune is composed of a single village, Tomești.

== Location ==
The village is located 22 km north of Miercurea-Ciuc along the Olt River.

== History ==
Its name was first mentioned in 1333 when, a sacerdos de Sancto Toma, a priest from St Thomas was mentioned. In 1441, it is recorded by its Hungarian names as Zenth Thamas, in 1549 as Szent Tamás. Until 1919, its Romanian name was Sântămas.

The village was part of the Székely Land region of the historical Transylvania province. It belonged to Csíkszék district until the administrative reform of Transylvania in 1876, when fell within the Csík County in the Kingdom of Hungary. After the Treaty of Trianon of 1920, it became part of Romania and fell within Ciuc County during the interwar period. In 1940, the second Vienna Award granted Northern Transylvania to Hungary and the village was held by Hungary until 1944. After Soviet occupation, the Romanian administration returned and the commune became officially part of Romania in 1947. Between 1952 and 1960, the commune fell within the Magyar Autonomous Region, between 1960 and 1968 the Mureș-Magyar Autonomous Region. In 1968, the province was abolished, and since then, the commune has been part of Harghita County.

== Demographics ==
The commune has an absolute Hungarian (Székely) majority. According to the 2011 census it has a population of 2,553 of which 99.37% or 2,537 are Hungarian. Formerly part of Cârța commune, the village broke off in 2004.

== Landmarks ==
- The ruins of the tower of the old village church (Csonkatorony) built in the era of the Árpád dynasty stands 1 km from the village.
- The new Roman Catholic church was built in baroque style in 1778. The church has preserved several art objects from the 15th century which used to belong to the old church. The most notable among them is a representation of the Blessed Virgin made in the 15th century. The church is surrounded by a fortified wall.
- The Feneketlen Lake (Bottomless Lake) which is fed by the water of hot springs is located at the foot of the church hill.

== Twinnings ==
The village is twinned with

- Forráskút, Hungary
- Gyenesdiás, Hungary
- Tét, Hungary

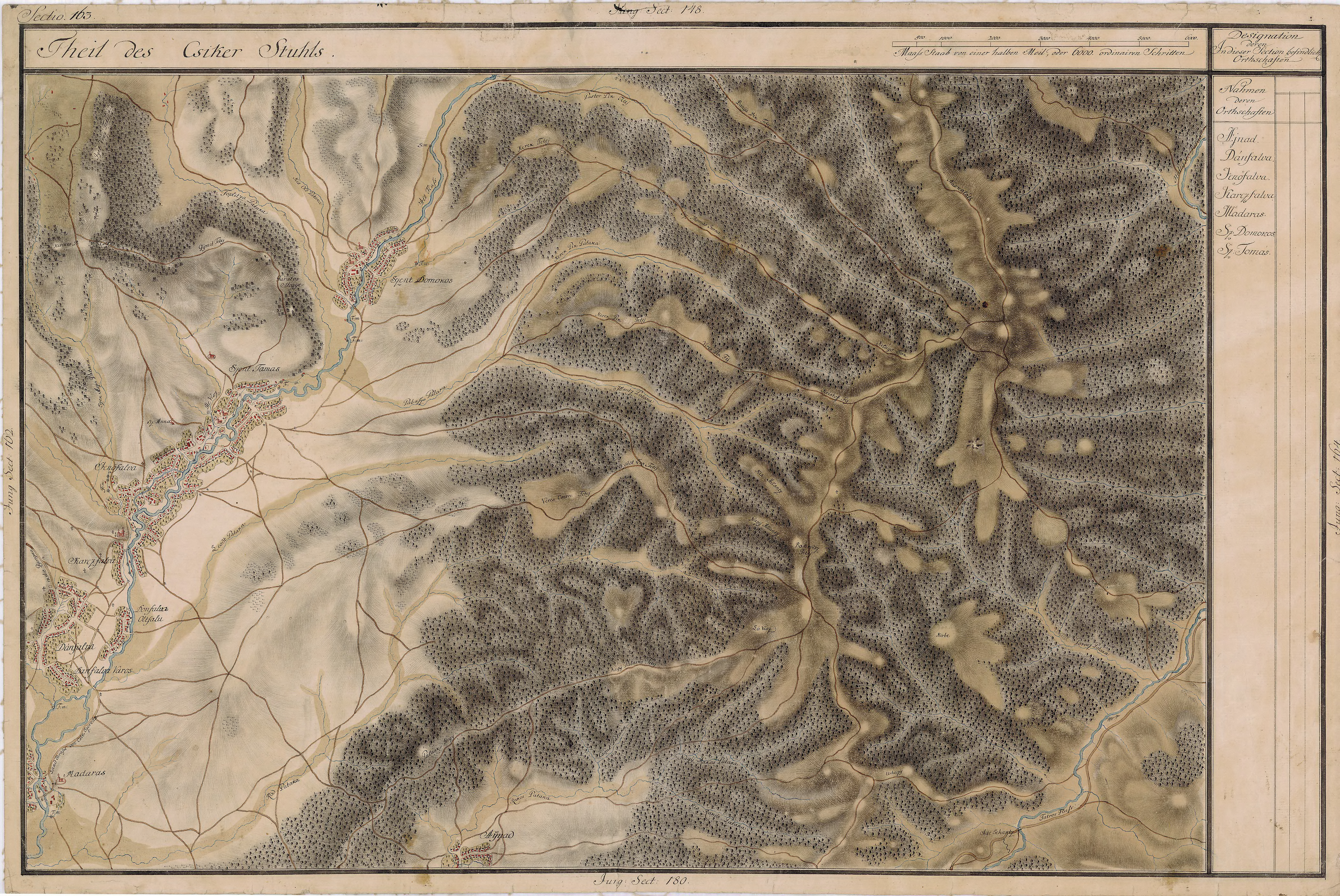
The village on an 18th-century map (Josephine land survey)
