= Lake Sfânta Ana =

Lacul Sfânta Ana
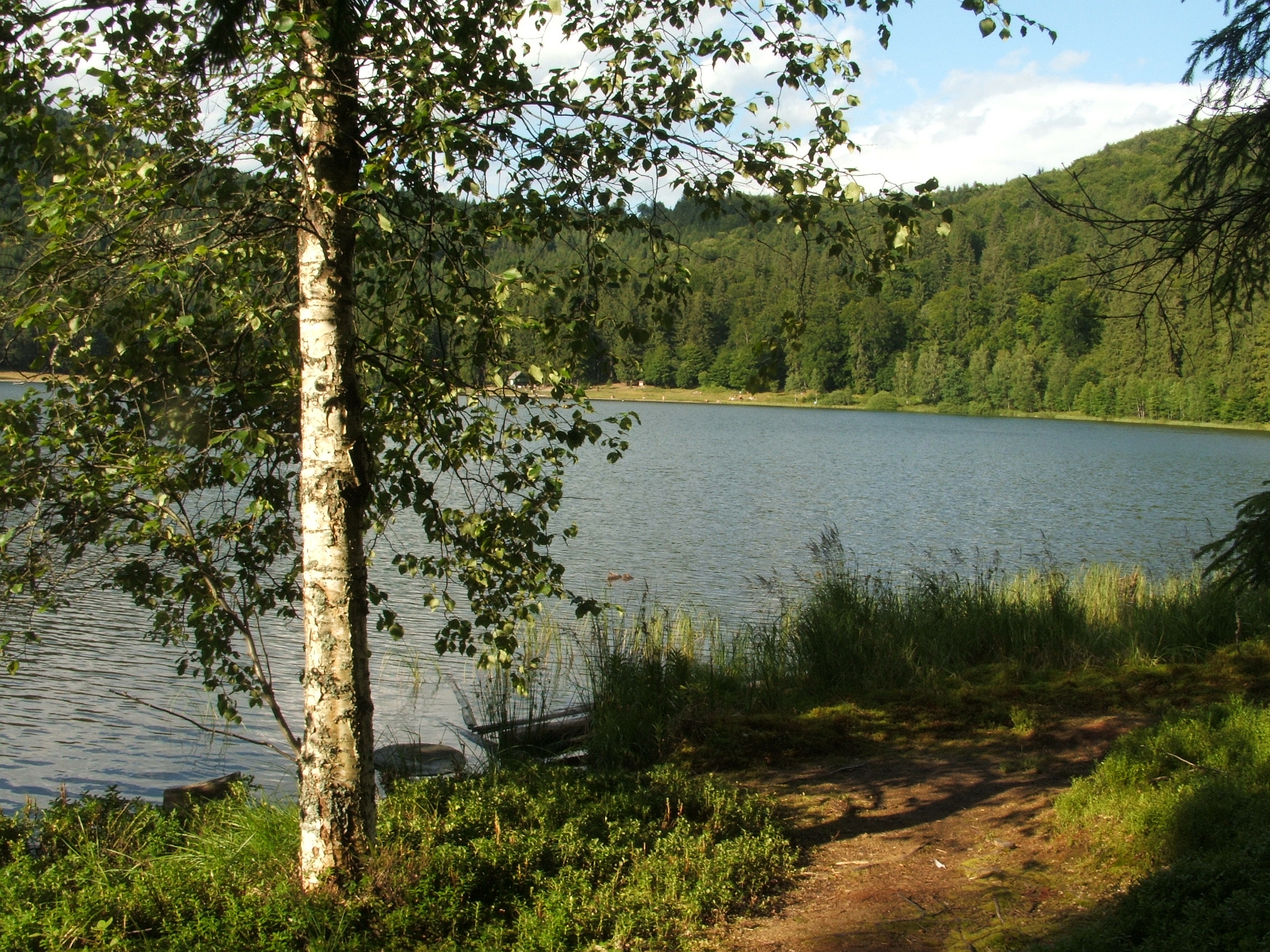
- Lake Sfânta Ana

- Location within Romania
- Location: Harghita County, Romania
- Coordinates: 46°7′35″N 25°53′17″E
- Type: Volcanic crater lake
- Basin countries: Romania
- Max. length: 620 m (2,030 ft)
- Max. width: 460 m (1,510 ft)
- Surface area: 0.2 km^{2} (0.077 sq mi)
- Average depth: 6.4 m (21 ft)
- Max. depth: 7 m (23 ft)
- Shore length^{1}: 1,617 m (5,305 ft)
- Surface elevation: 946 m (3,104 ft)
- ^{1} Shore length is not a well-defined measure.

Lake Sfânta Ana (Romanian pronunciation: [ˈsfɨnta ˈana]; Hungarian: Szent Anna-tó; lit. 'Saint Anne Lake') is the only crater lake in Romania, located in the volcanic crater of the Ciomad volcano of the Eastern Carpathians, near Tușnad in the Natural Reserve of Mohoș, Harghita County, Romania.

Palynology studies concluded that the history of Lake Saint Anne began about 9,800-8,800 years ago, at the stage of peat bog and shallow lake.

The age of Lake Sfânta Ana has not yet been accurately determined, with various researchers estimating that the last eruption of the volcano in whose crater the lake is located, occurred 32,000 years ago (Juvigne et al. 1994), 10,500 years ago (Morya et al. 1996), or even 9,800 years ago (Magyari et al. 2006).

Although that volcano is currently inactive, a 2019 study indicated that there is still potential for reactivation in the future.

The depth of Saint Anne Lake is constantly decreasing. In 1867 it was 12 m, but now it is less than 7 m. In 2005, the maximum depth of the lake was 6.4 m and the sediment thickness was about 4 m. The lake is supplied exclusively from precipitation, therefore the degree of mineralization of the water is very low. The water purity approaches that of distilled water, with only 0.0029 ml mineral.

The lake is located at an altitude of 946 m. Almost circular in shape, similar to a painter's palette, it is 620 m long and 460 m wide at its widest point, with a surface area of 19.50 ha.

In winter, the lake is covered with a layer of ice of up to 1 m. The lake is part of the Mohos Nature Reserve.

Near the lake there is a Roman Catholic chapel dedicated to Saint Anne.

Swimming in the lake in general has been prohibited since April 2018. It is available only for sporting events under special permits.
