= Băile Tușnad =

Băile Tușnad Tusnádfürdő
- Town
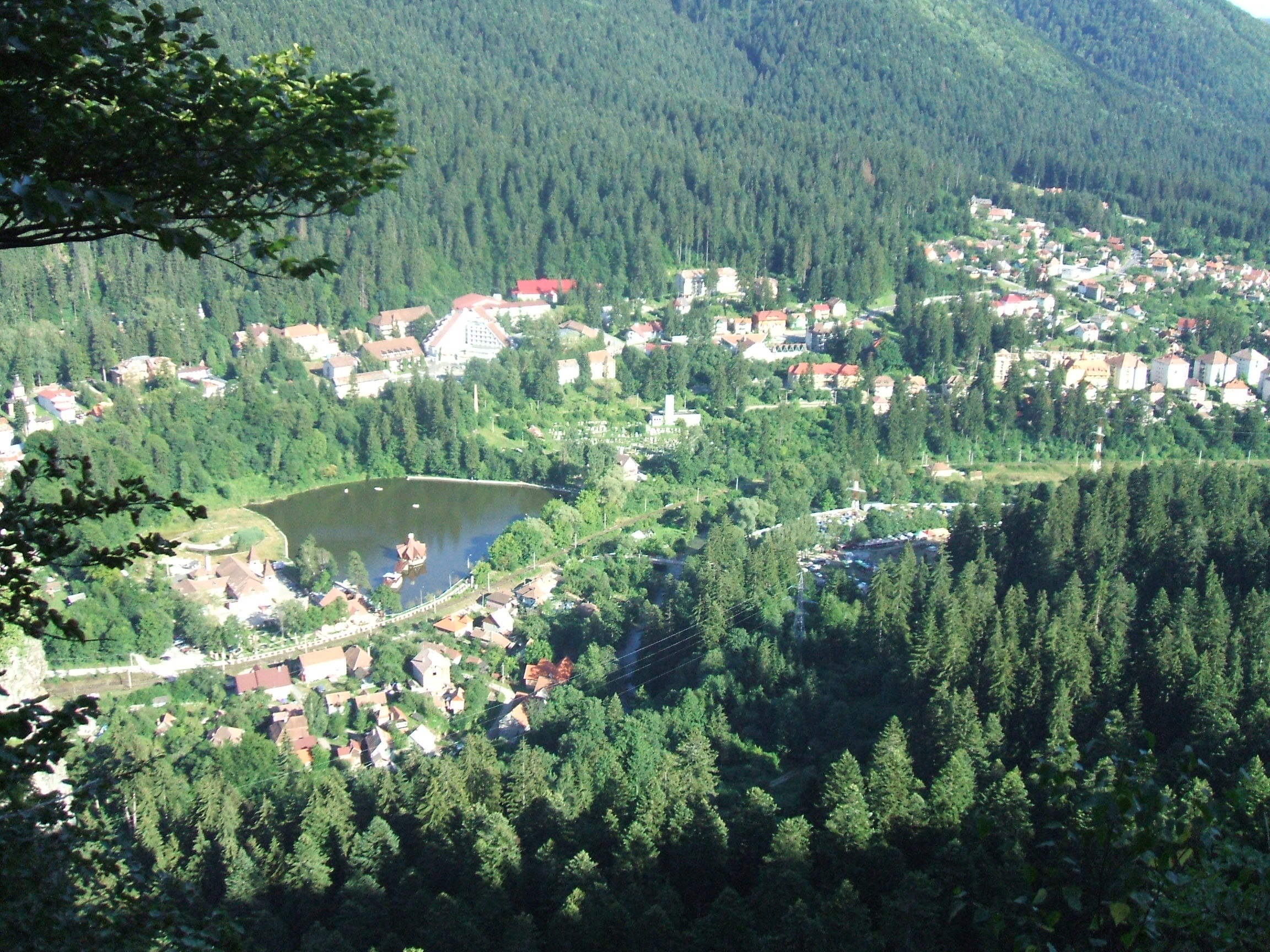

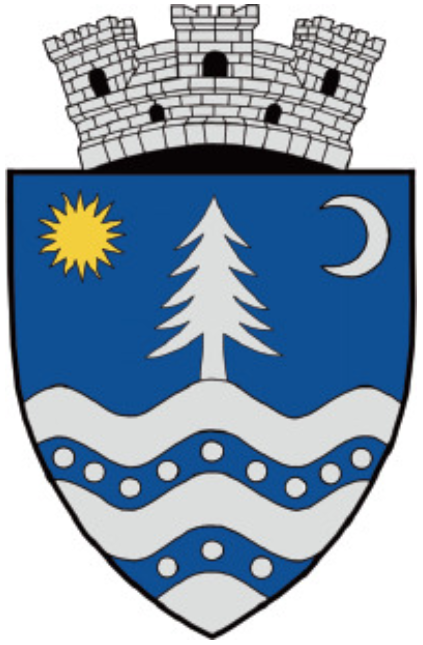
- Coat of arms

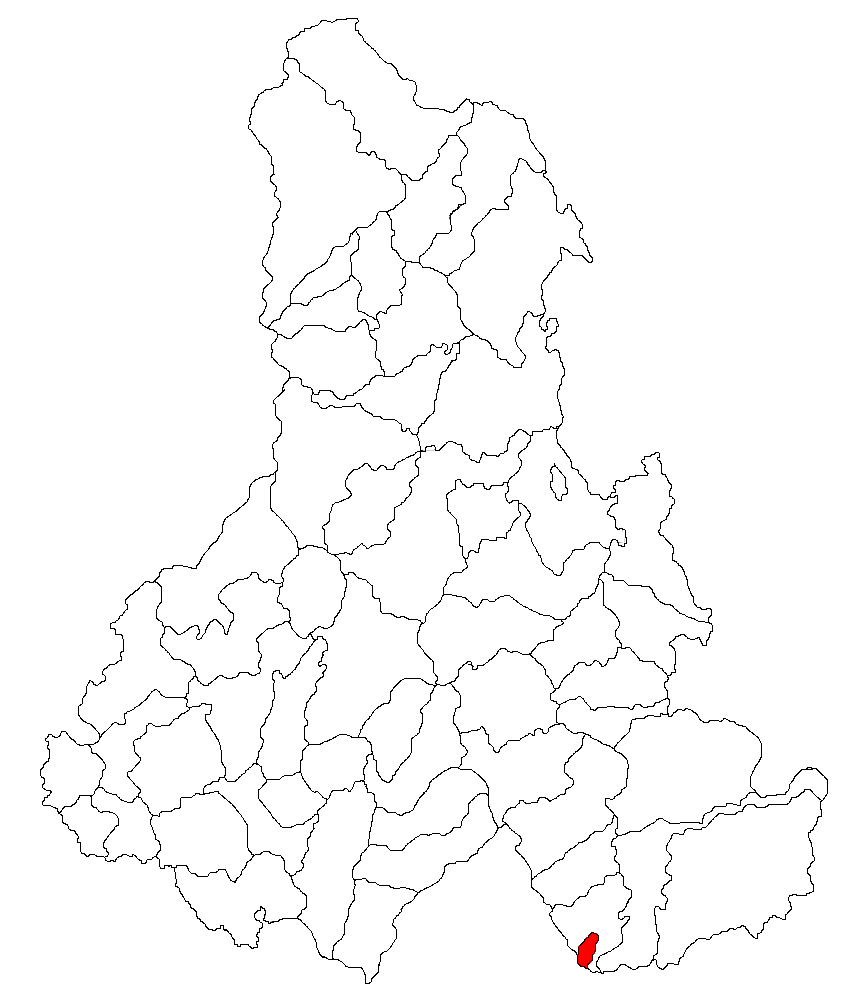
- Location in Harghita County

- Location in Romania
- Coordinates: 46°08′49″N 25°51′38″E
- Country: Romania
- County: Harghita

Government
  - Mayor (2024–2028): Zsolt Butyka (Ind.)
- Area: 1.89 km^{2} (0.73 sq mi)
- Elevation: 650 m (2,130 ft)
- Population (2021-12-01): 1,372
  - Density: 726/km^{2} (1,880/sq mi)
- Time zone: UTC+02:00 (EET)
  - Summer (DST): UTC+03:00 (EEST)
- Postal code: 535100
- Area code: +(40) 266
- Vehicle reg.: HR
- Website: primariabailetusnad.ro

Băile Tușnad (Romanian pronunciation: [ˈbə.ile ˈtuʃnad]; Hungarian: Tusnádfürdő, pronounced [ˈtuʃnaːtfyrdøː]) is a town in Harghita County, Romania in eastern Transylvania.

With a population of 1,372 (as of 2021), it is the smallest town in Romania by population. It is located at an altitude of 650 m (2,130 ft) in the southern reaches of the Ciuc depression, between the Harghita and Bodoc mountains, in the valley of the Olt River, and is to this day an important spa town. The town administers one village, Carpitus (Kárpitus).

== History ==
The town and the surrounding area are famous for their spas and mineral waters received from seven springs. Nearby is the Lake Sfânta Ana, a famous volcanic crater lake, the only one of its kind in Romania.

The water has long been used for bathing by the Székely people. The most probable date for the founding of the bathing station is 1842. It was an alleged miraculous healing of the son of a shepherd from his rashes that first attracted widespread attention to the therapeutic properties of local mineral waters, after which a company was founded to develop the springs in 1845. The bathing station was destroyed in the skirmishes of 1849, but Austrian Emperor Franz Joseph, on visiting the town in 1852, ordered the reconstruction of the baths.

The rapid development of the town began after 1860. The Mikes-source was named in honour of count Benedek Mikes, chairman of the spa committee, who appointed a chemist at his own expense to analyse the water of the spring bearing his name. This marked the start of the scientific evaluation and utilisation of local mineral waters. The Stefánia Medical Center was opened in 1890 and remained the treatment center of the spa until 1975. Lake Csukás (now: Ciucaș) was artificially created in 1900, and the big hotels of the town were built in the 1970s.

The settlement was historically part of the Székely Land area of Transylvania and belonged to Csíkszék district until the administrative reform of Transylvania in 1876, when it fell within Csík County in the Kingdom of Hungary. In the aftermath of World War I, the Union of Transylvania with Romania was declared in December 1918. At the start of the Hungarian–Romanian War of 1918–1919, the town passed under Romanian administration. After the Treaty of Trianon of 1920, it became part of the Kingdom of Romania and fell within Ciuc County during the interwar period. In 1940, the Second Vienna Award granted Northern Transylvania to Hungary. Towards the end of World War II, Romanian and Soviet armies entered the town in October 1944. The territory of Northern Transylvania remained under Soviet military administration until March 9, 1945, after which it became again part of Romania. Between 1952 and 1960, Băile Tușnad fell within the Magyar Autonomous Region, and between 1960 and 1968 the Mureș-Magyar Autonomous Region. In 1968, the region was abolished, and since then, the commune, as a town, has been part of Harghita County.

== Demographics ==
At the 2021 census, Băile Tușnad had a population of 1,372. At the 2011 census, the population was 1,617; the town had a Székely Hungarian majority with 1,460 (90.3%) Hungarians, and small communities of ethnic Romanians (6.9%) and Romani (2.6%).

Historical demographic data
| Year | Total | Romanians | Hungarians | Germans | Others |
|---|---|---|---|---|---|
| 1941 | 724 | 3 | 711 | 9 | 1 |
| 1956 | 965 | 102 | 808 | 49 | 6 |
| 1966 | 1,204 | 104 | 1,095 | 3 | 2 |
| 1977 | 1,880 | 158 | 1,712 | 6 | 4 |
| 1992 | 1,969 | 133 | 1,835 | 1 | - |
| 2002 | 1,728 | 106 | 1,615 | - | 7 |
| 2011 | 1,617 | 112 | 1,460 | - | 45 |
| 2021 | 1,372 | 105 | 1,142 | - | 125 |

Demographic trends according to the censuses:

== Spa information ==
=== Therapeutic indications ===
- Cardiovascular disease (post heart attack recovery, valvular disease of the heart muscle, hypertension, circulatory problems)
- Nervous system disorders (neurasthenia, neurovegetative dystonia, secondary asthenic conditions, physical and intellectual fatigue)
- Digestive problems (stomach diseases, functional bowel disorders, chronic gastritis, enterocolitis, biliary dyskinesia)
- Endocrine disorders (hyperthyroidism, mild adrenal insufficiency, Basedow's disease)

=== Types of treatments ===
- Spa with CO_{2}, mofettes, galvanic baths, massage
- Paraffin, herbal baths, massage
- Magneto-diaflux, ionization medical gymnastics
- Internal treatment with mineral water, manual reflex massage
- Magnet therapy, soil treatment

=== Elements of natural treatment ===
- Carbonated mineral water, chlorine, sodium, bicarbonate
- Moffettes
- Subalpine tonic-stimulant bioclimate

=== Composition of mineral water sources ===
- Stănescu Spring: output of 405 L / h, T 7 °C, pH 6.2; naturally carbonated, with bicarbonate, sodium, calcium, magnesium
- Apor Spring: output of 7200 L / h, T 7 °C, pH 5.3; hypotonic, naturally carbonated, ferruginous, with chlorine, bicarbonate, sodium, calcium
- Mikes Spring: free output, T 14 °C, pH 5.6; hypotonic, naturally carbonated, mildly ferruginous, with chlorine, bicarbonate, sodium

== Twin towns – sister cities ==
Băile Tușnad is twinned with:

- Balatonalmádi, Hungary
- Bicske, Hungary
- Csepel (Budapest), Hungary
- Harkány, Hungary
- Jánoshalma, Hungary
- Orosháza, Hungary
- Pestszentlőrinc-Pestszentimre (Budapest), Hungary

== Gallery ==
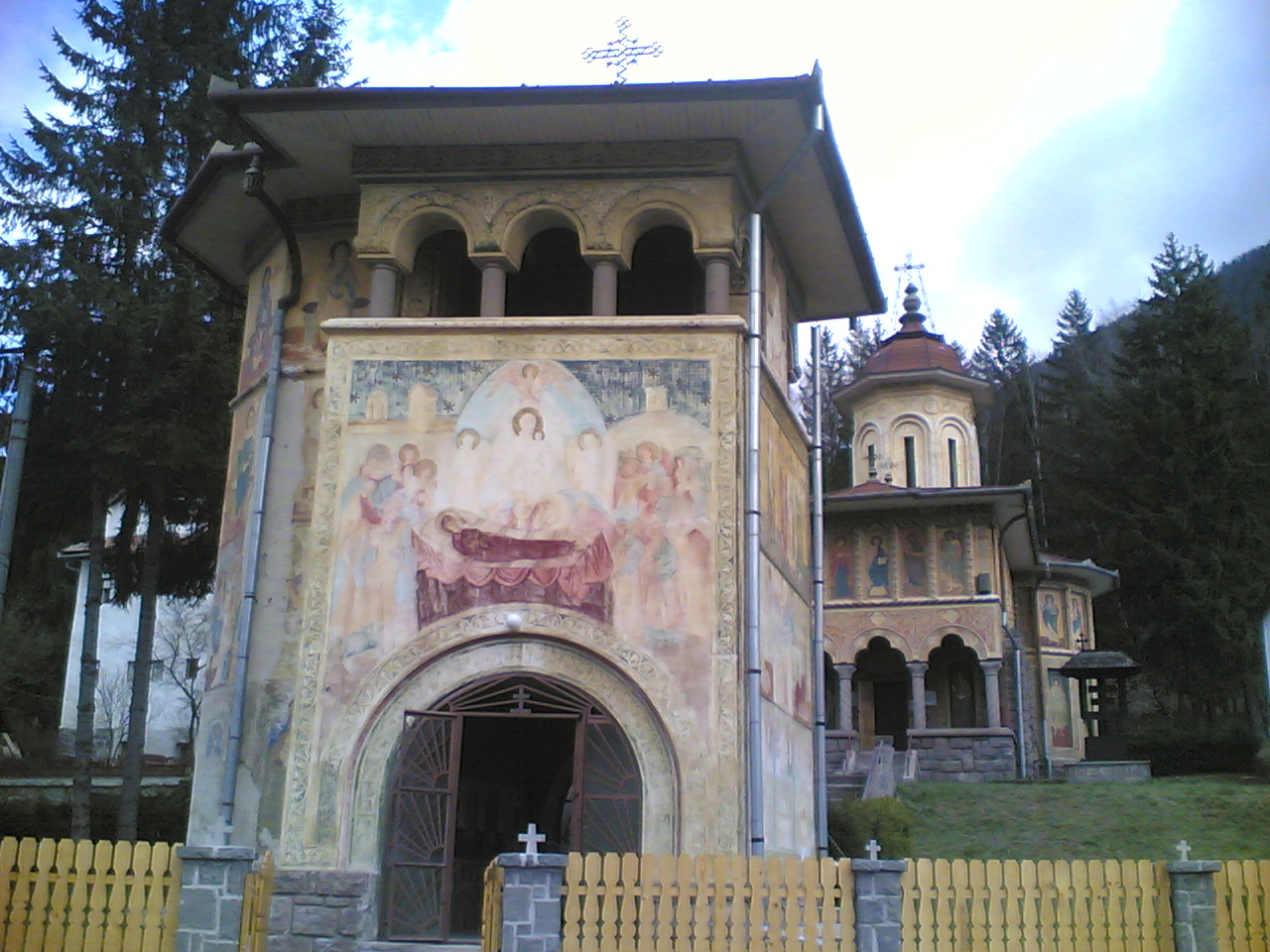
Romanian Orthodox church

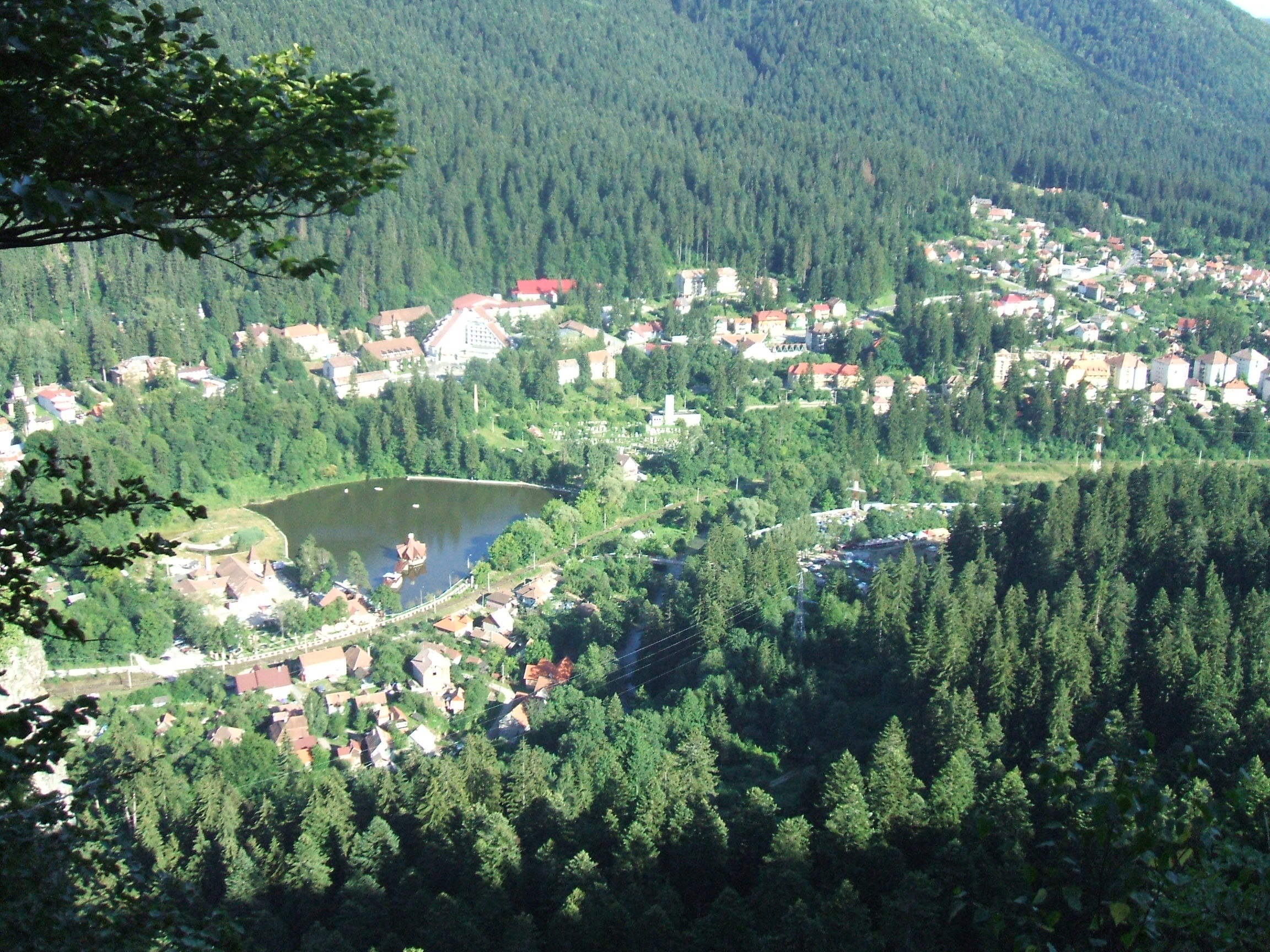
Lake Ciucaș

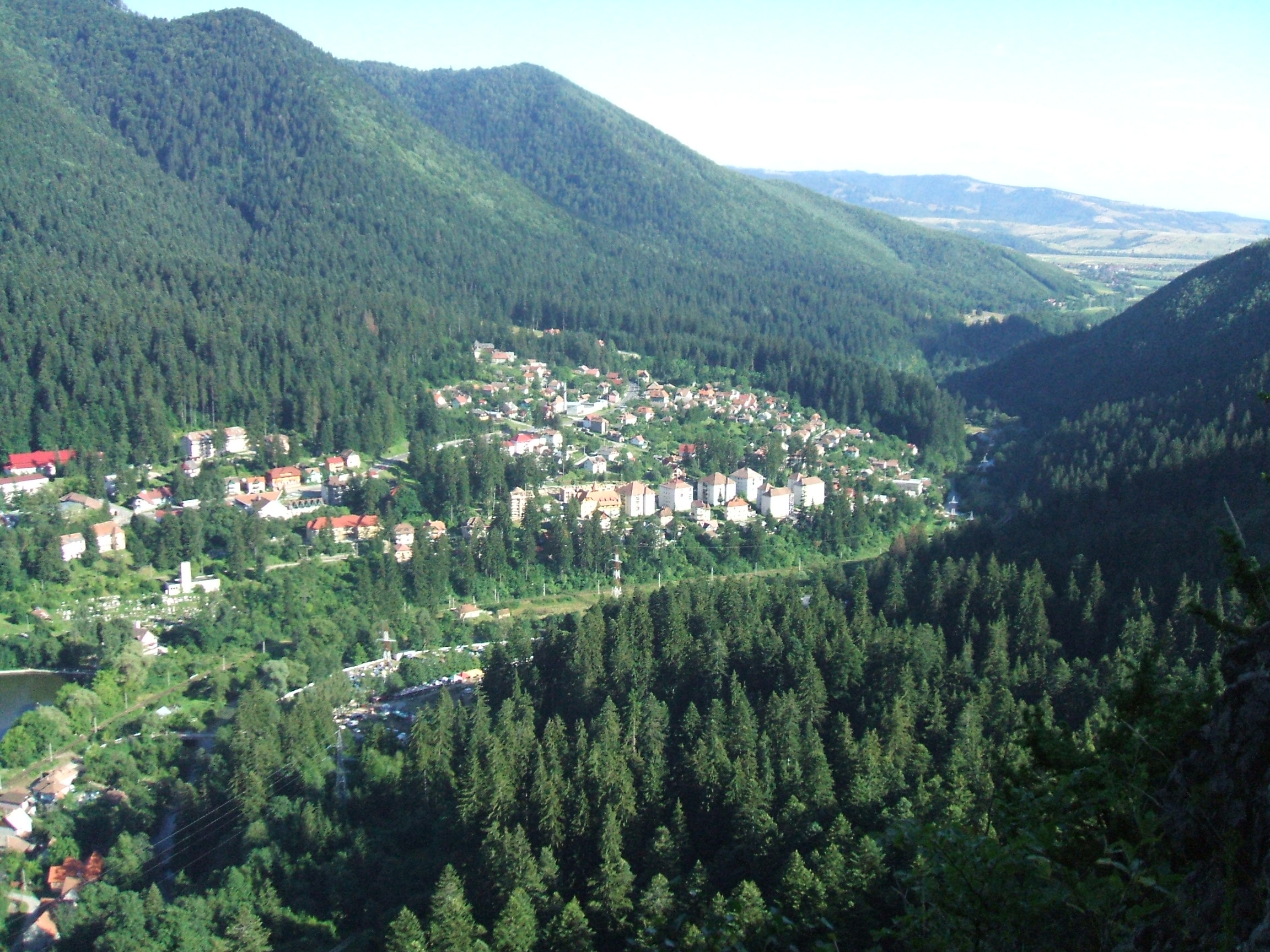
Valley of the Olt River

== See also ==
- Tusványos
