= Sânsimion =

Sânsimion Csíkszentsimon
- Commune
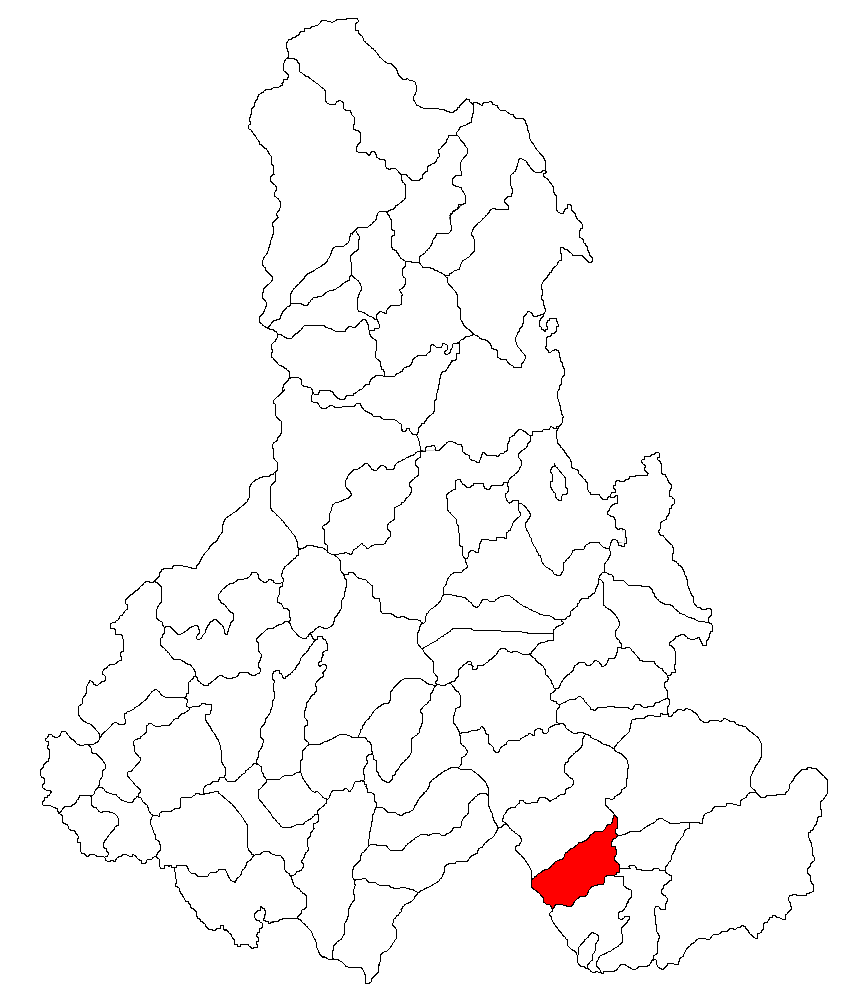
- Location in Harghita County

- Location in Romania
- Coordinates: 46°16′N 25°53′E
- Country: Romania
- County: Harghita

Government
  - Mayor (2020–2024): István-Florin Kozma (UDMR)
- Area: 46.30 km^{2} (17.88 sq mi)
- Population (2021-12-01): 3,407
  - Density: 74/km^{2} (190/sq mi)
- Time zone: EET/EEST (UTC+2/+3)
- Postal code: 537285
- Area code: +40 266
- Vehicle reg.: HR
- Website: csikszentsimon.ro

Sânsimion (Hungarian: Csíkszentsimon or colloquially Szentsimon, [tʃiːksɛnʃimon], meaning "St. Simon of Csík") is a commune in Harghita County, Romania. It lies in the Székely Land, an ethno-cultural region in eastern Transylvania.

== Component villages ==
The commune is composed of two villages:

In Romanian	In Hungarian
Cetățuia	Csatószeg
Sânsimion	Csíkszentsimon

== History ==
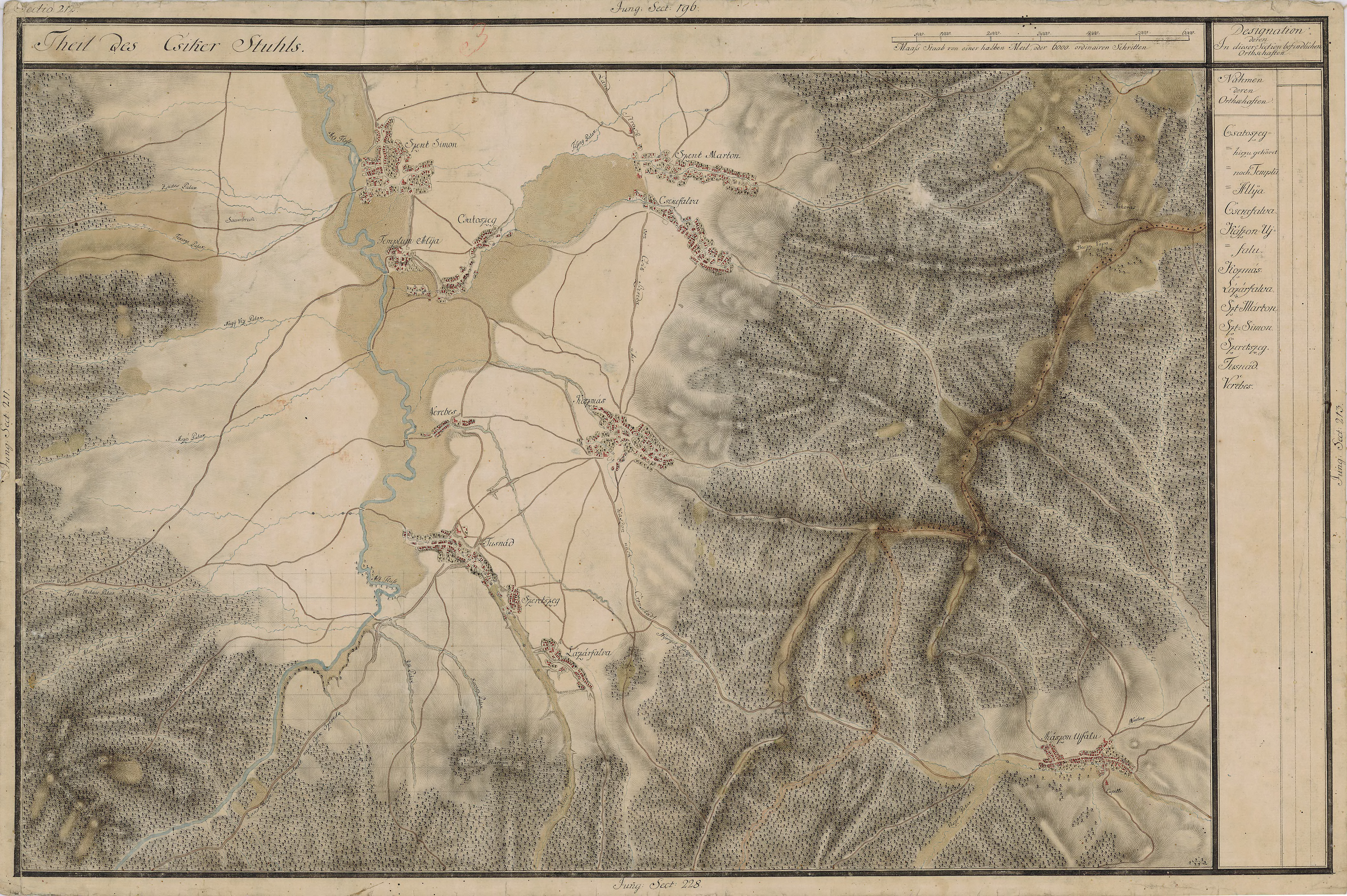
The villages on 18th century map (Josephinische Landaufnahme)

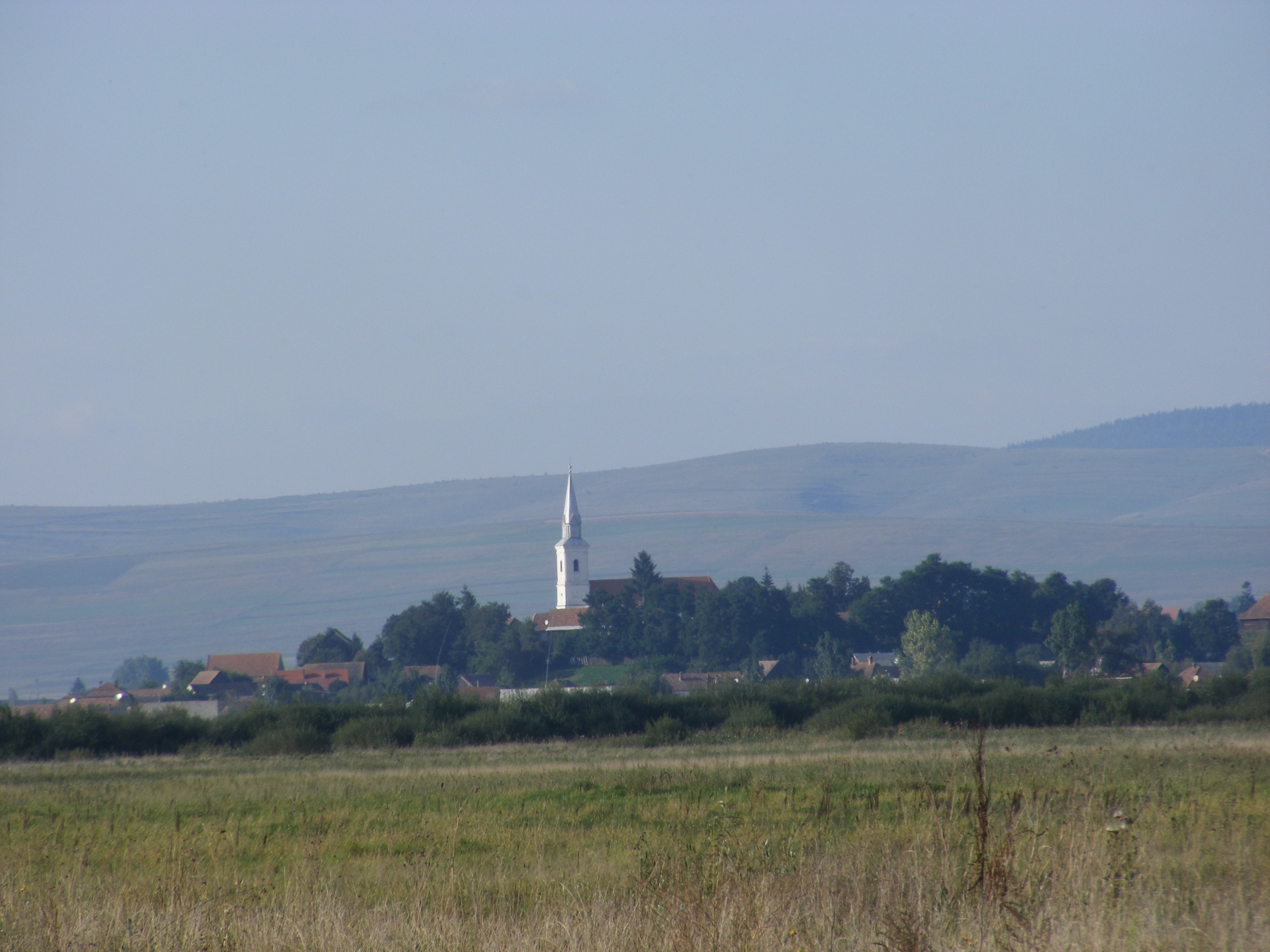
Cetăţuia

The settlements were historically part of the Székely Land area of Transylvania.

Between 1762 and 1851, the village provided recruits for the 3rd Company of the First Székely Infantry Regiment.

They belonged administratively to Csíkszék district until the administrative reform of Transylvania in 1876, when they fell within Csík County in the Kingdom of Hungary. After the Treaty of Trianon of 1920, they became part of Romania and fell within Ciuc County during the interwar period. In 1940, the second Vienna Award granted the Northern Transylvania to Hungary and the villages were held by Hungary until 1944. After Soviet occupation, the Romanian administration returned and they became officially part of Romania in 1947. Between 1952 and 1960, the commune fell within the Magyar Autonomous Region, between 1960 and 1968 the Mureș-Magyar Autonomous Region. In 1968, the province was abolished, and since then, the commune has been part of Harghita County.

== Demographics ==
The commune has an absolute Székely Hungarian majority. According to the 2011 census it has a population of 3,429 of which 98.48% or 3,377 are Hungarian.

== Twinnings ==
The commune is twinned with: Ózd, Hungary
