= Tușnad =

Tușnad Tusnád
- Commune
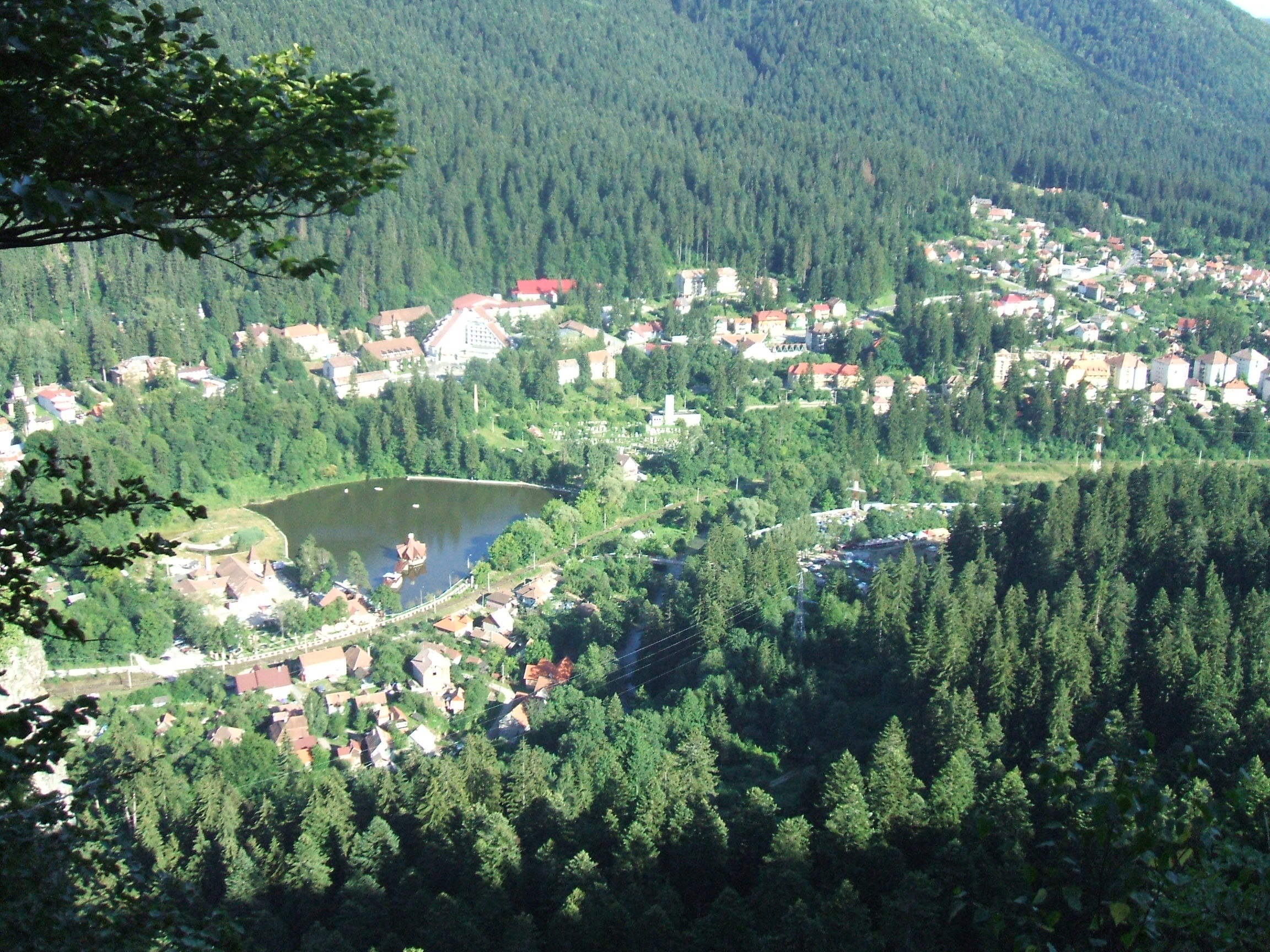

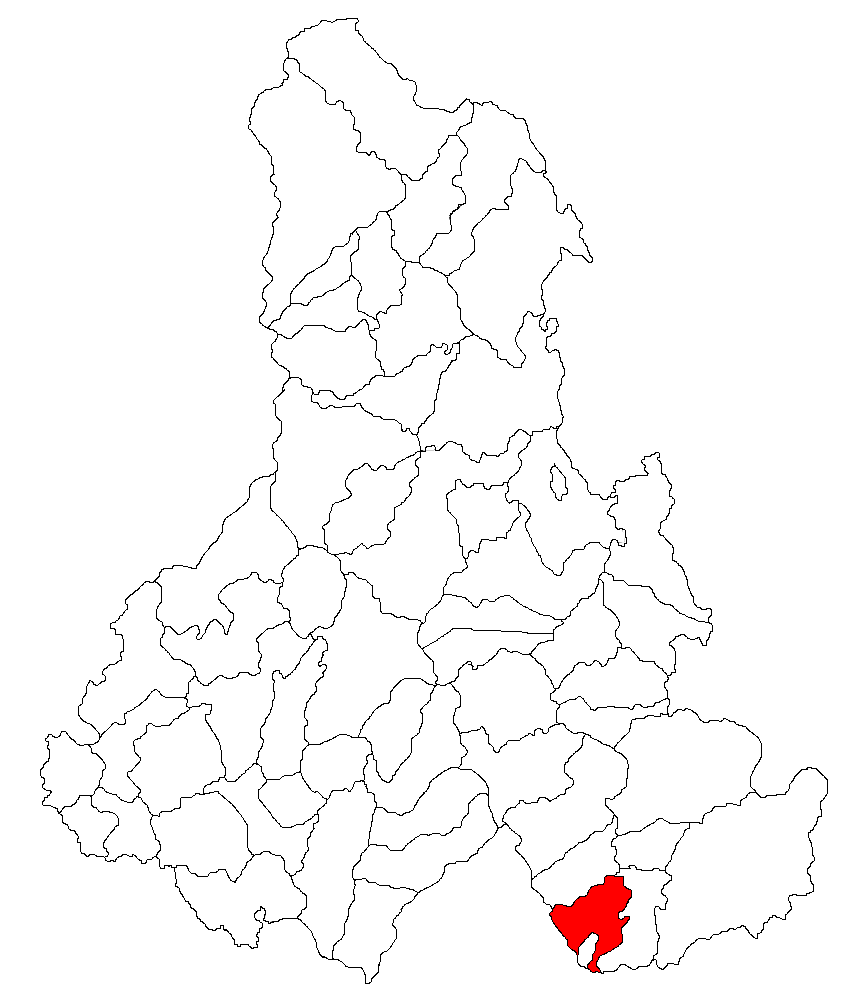
- Location in Harghita County

- Location in Romania
- Coordinates: 46°12′N 25°54′E
- Country: Romania
- County: Harghita

Government
  - Mayor (2020–2024): József Molnár (UDMR)
- Area: 76.64 km^{2} (29.59 sq mi)
- Population (2021-12-01): 2,006
  - Density: 26.17/km^{2} (67.79/sq mi)
- Time zone: UTC+02:00 (EET)
  - Summer (DST): UTC+03:00 (EEST)
- Vehicle reg.: HR

Tușnad (Hungarian: Tusnád, Hungarian pronunciation: [ˈtuʃnaːd]) is a commune in Harghita County, Romania. It lies in the Székely Land, an ethno-cultural region in eastern Transylvania, and is composed of three villages:

| In Romanian | In Hungarian |
|---|---|
| Tușnad | Tusnád |
| Tușnadu Nou | Újtusnád |
| Vrabia | Csíkverebes |

== Demographics ==
The commune has an absolute Székely Hungarian majority. According to the 2011 census it has a population of 2,117 which 92.73% or 1,963 are Hungarian.

== Name ==
The village of Tusnád is often referred to as Tușnad-Sat or Tusnád-Falu to avoid confusion with the touristic centre of Băile Tușnad to the south. Romanian State Railways also makes this distinction.

== Natives ==
- Iuliana Simon
