= Ciuc County =

Județul Ciuc
- County (Județ)
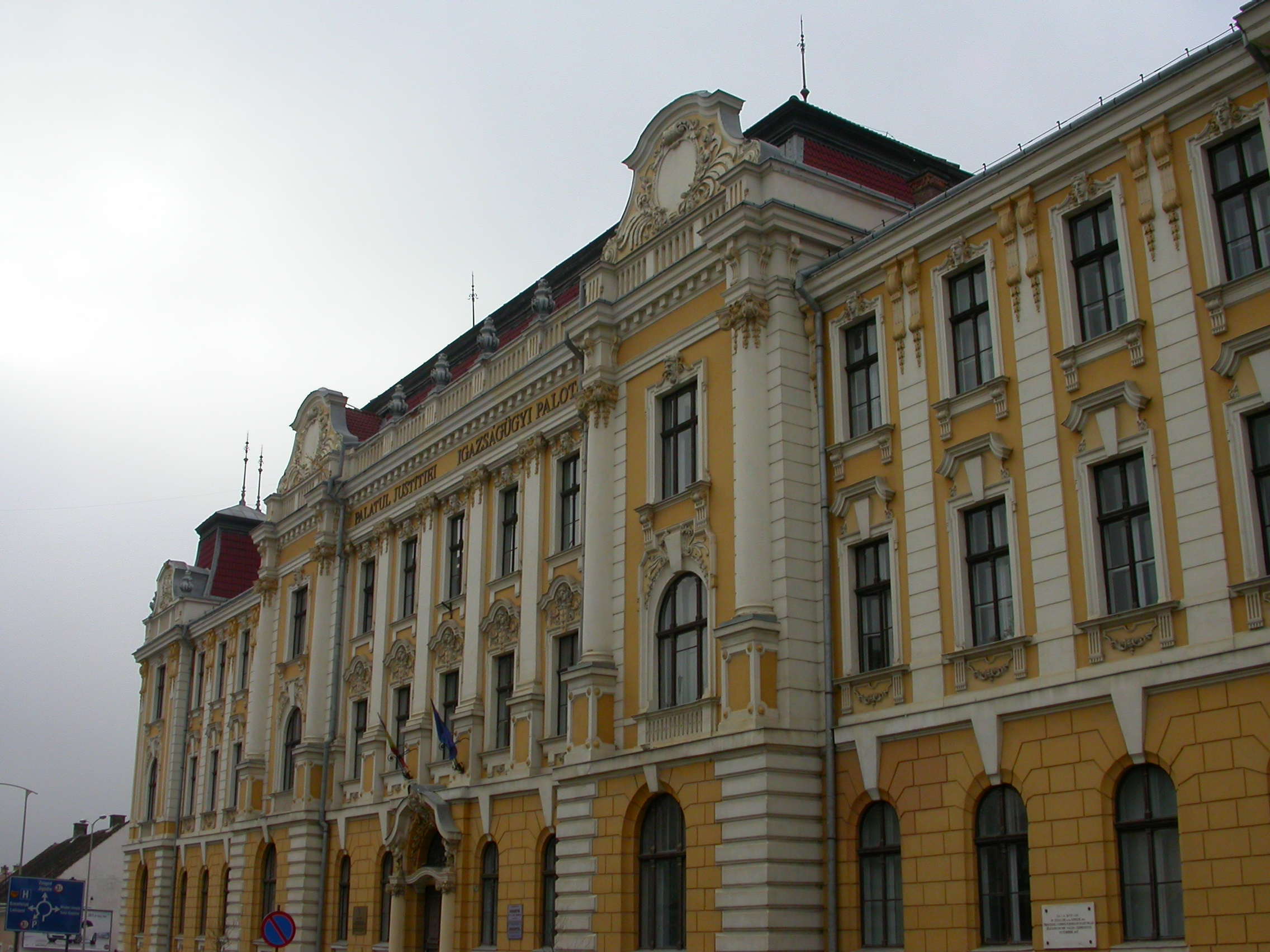
- Ciuc County court building from the interwar period, currently the Harghita County court.

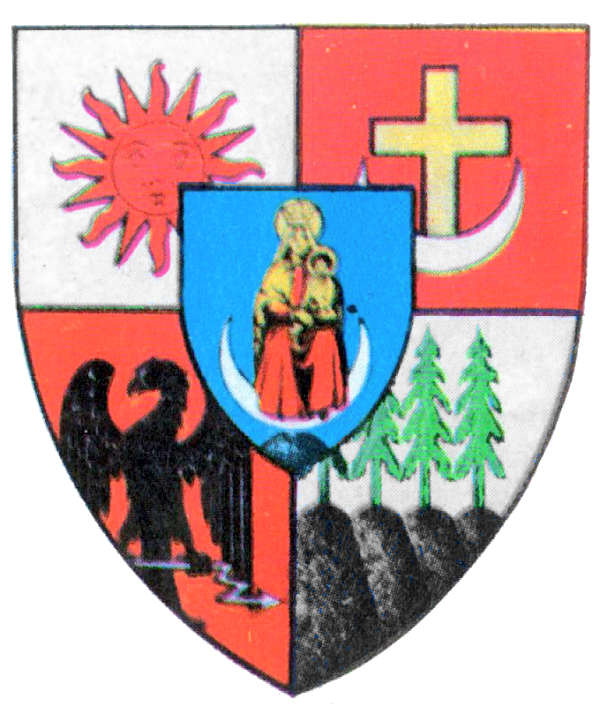
- Coat of arms

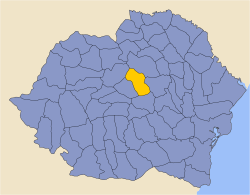
- Country: Romania
- Historic region: Transylvania
- Capital city (Reședință de județ): Miercurea Ciuc
- Established: 1925
- Ceased to exist: Administrative and Constitutional Reform in 1938

Area
  - Total: 4,993 km^{2} (1,928 sq mi)

Population (1930)
  - Total: 146,584
  - Density: 29.36/km^{2} (76.04/sq mi)
- Time zone: UTC+2 (EET)
  - Summer (DST): UTC+3 (EEST)

Ciuc County is a historical county (Romanian: județ) in the Kingdom of Romania. Its capital was Miercurea Ciuc. Its name was derived from the former county of the Kingdom of Hungary, Csík.

== History ==
Prior to World War I, the territory of the county belonged to Austria-Hungary and was identical with the Csík County of the Kingdom of Hungary. The territory of Ciuc County was transferred to Romania from Hungary as successor state to Austria-Hungary in 1920 under the Treaty of Trianon. After the administrative unification law in 1925, the name of the county remained as it was, but the territory was reorganized.

In 1938, King Carol II promulgated a new Constitution, and subsequently he had the administrative division of the Romanian territory changed. 10 ținuturi (approximate translation: "lands") were created (by merging the counties) to be ruled by rezidenți regali (approximate translation: "Royal Residents") - appointed directly by the King - instead of the prefects. Ciuc County became part of Ținutul Mureș.

In 1940, the county was transferred back to Hungary with the rest of Northern Transylvania under the Second Vienna Award. Beginning in 1944, Romanian forces with Soviet assistance recaptured the ceded territory and reintegrated it into Romania, re-establishing the county. Romanian jurisdiction over the county per the Treaty of Trianon was reaffirmed in the Paris Peace Treaties, 1947. The county was disestablished by the communist government of Romania in 1950, and not re-established in 1968 when Romania restored the county administrative system.

== Geography ==
Ciuc County covered 4,993 km^{2} and was located in central part of Greater Romania, in the eastern part of Transylvania. Currently, the territory that comprised Ciuc County is now part of Harghita County. After 1925, the county neighbored Odorhei County to the west, Mureș County to the north, Neamț County and Bacău County to the east, and Trei Scaune County to the south.

== Administrative organization ==
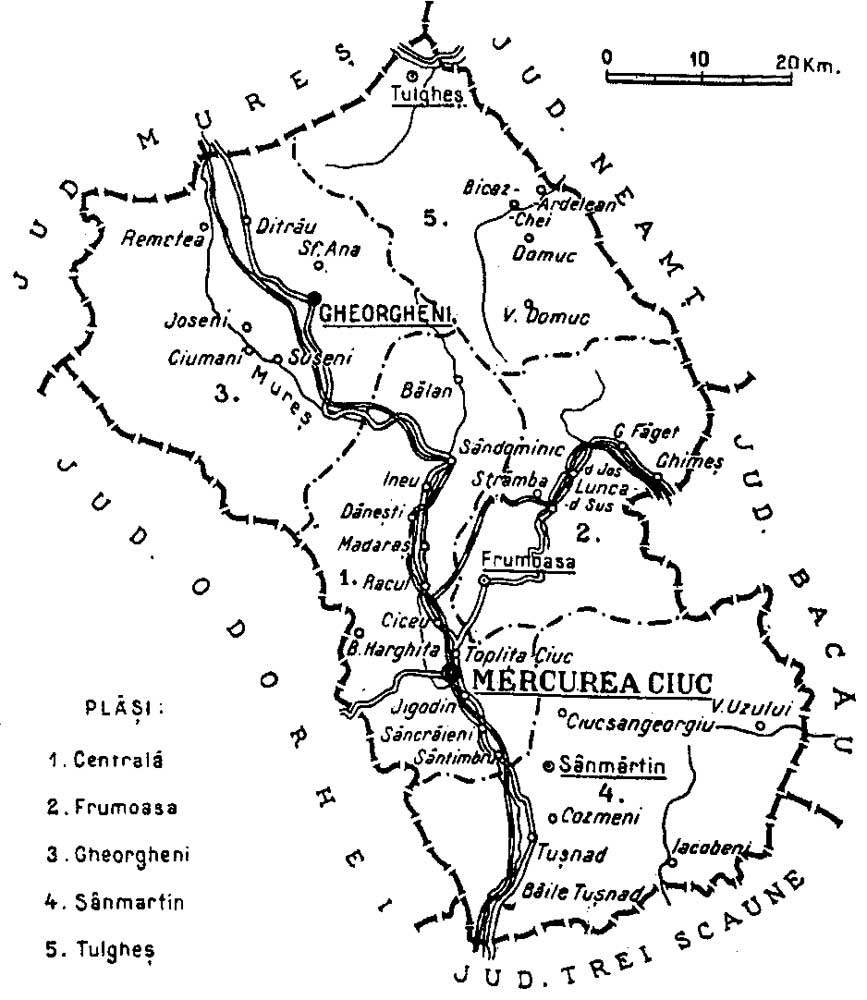
Map of Ciuc County as constituted in 1938.

Administratively, Ciuc County was originally divided into four districts (plăși):

1. Plasa Centrală, headquartered at Miercurea Ciuc
2. Plasa Frumoasa, headquartered at Frumoasa
3. Plasa Gheorgheni, headquartered at Gheorgheni
4. Plasa Sân-Mărtin, headquartered at Sân-Mărtin

Subsequently, a fifth district was created:

5. Plasa Tulgheș, headquartered at Tulgheș

== Population ==
According to the Romanian census of 1930 the population of Ciuc County was 145,806, of which 82.7% were ethnic Hungarians, 14.4% ethnic Romanians, and 1.6% Jews. Classified by religion: 81.3% were Roman Catholic, 13.8% Greek-Catholic, 1.7% Jewish, 1.9% Reformed (Calivinist), and 1.3% Orthodox Christian.

=== Urban population ===
In 1930 the urban population of Ciuc County was 15,162, which included 83.8% Hungarians, 8.1% Romanians, and 5.6% Jews by ethnicity. The religious mix of the urban population was 78.9% Roman Catholic, 5.9% Jewish, 4.5% Greek-Catholic, 4.2% Reformed, 4.0% Eastern Orthodox, and 1.2% Armenian Catholic.
