= List of rivers of Romania: V–Z =

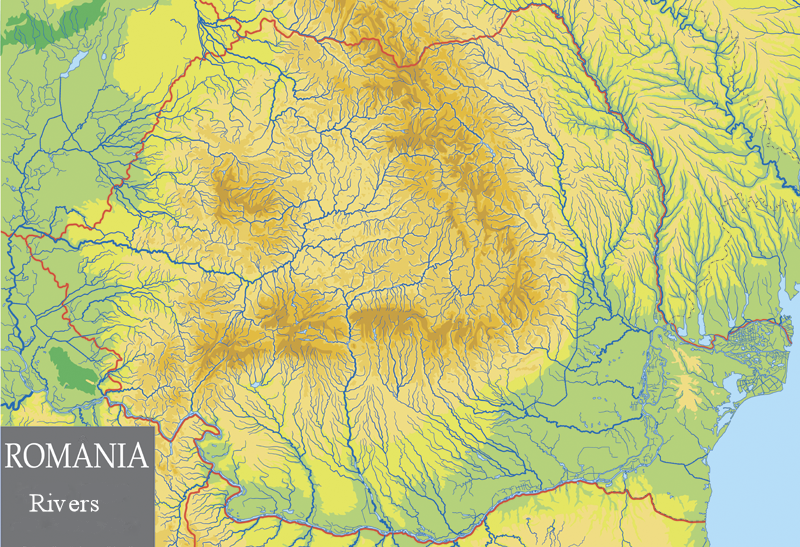
Map of Romania's hydrographic network

== V ==
River	Tributary of
Vad	Olt
Vad	Someș
Vădana	Bega
Vaia	Niraj
Vaidei	Mureș
Vâjiștea	Teleorman
Vălărița	Cerna
Vâlcele	Olt
Valchid	Târnava Mare
Valea Albă	Barcău
Valea Albă	Câlniștea
Valea Albă	Valea Rea
Valea Baciului	Urluia
Valea Bădenilor	Dâmbovița
Valea Beliei	Prahova
Valea Boiului	Crișul Repede
Valea Boului	Buzău
Valea Buciumanilor	Abrud
Valea Cărbunelui	Cerna
Valea Caselor	Arieș
Valea Caselor	Sebeș
Valea Cerbului	Prahova
Valea Cetății	Timiș Canal
Valea Cheii	Dâmbovița
Valea Crișului	Olt
Valea cu Pești	Argeș
Valea Danului	Argeș
Valea de la Lazuri	Crișul Alb
Valea de Pești	Jiul de Vest
Valea din Jos	Mureș
Valea Dolii	Arieșul Mic
Valea Fânețelor	Barcău
Valea Frumoasă	Borumlaca
Valea Iașului	Argeș
Valea Înfundăturii	Hârtibaciu
Valea Lacului	Barcău
Valea Largă	Arieș
Valea Largă	Dâmbovița
Valea Lată	Valea Largă
Valea Lată Sărată	Ialomița
Valea Locii	Nicolina
Valea lui Coman	Dâmbovița
Valea lui Damian	Câlniștea
Valea lui Dan	Someșul Mare
Valea lui Iovan	Cerna

River	Tributary of
Valea lui Stan	Argeș
Valea lui Vasile	Topa
Valea Luncanilor	Strei
Valea Lungă	Ilișua
Valea Lungă	Târnava Mare
Valea Mare	Almaș
Valea Mare	Arieș
Valea Mare	Barcău
Valea Mare	Cigher
Valea Mare	Covasna
Valea Mare	Crișul Negru near Cusuiuș
Valea Mare	Crișul Negru near Șuncuiș
Valea Mare	Danube
Valea Mare	Mureș
Valea Mare	Nadăș
Valea Mare	Netezi
Valea Mare	Olt
Valea Mare	Râul Doamnei
Valea Mare	Someșul Mare
Valea Mare	Timiș
Valea Mare Cărpinoasa	Crișul Pietros
Valea Mărului	Someșul Mic
Valea Miței	Zalău
Valea Morii	Hârtibaciu
Valea Morii	Iza
Valea Morii	Pârâul de Câmpie
Valea Morii	Târnava Mare
Valea Muntelui	Talna
Valea Neagră	Crasna
Valea Neagră	Crișul Negru
Valea Neagră	Siret
Valea Negrileștilor	Valea Mare
Valea Nesecată	Gepiu
Valea Nouă	Crișul Negru
Valea Nouă	Teuz
Valea Nouă Chișer	Crișul Alb
Valea Oii	Bahlueț
Valea Păcurarului	Râul Doamnei
Valea Pietrei	Râul Mare
Valea Porumbenilor	Câlniștea
Valea Racilor	Arieș
Valea Racilor	Jilț

River	Tributary of
Valea Rea	Tărățel
Valea Rea	Tecucel
Valea Rea	Tur
Valea Rece	Trotuș
Valea Roșie	Crișul Negru
Valea Roșie	Olt
Valea Roșie	Petriș
Valea Roștilor	Danube
Valea Sălașelor	Iara
Valea Sărată	Arieș
Valea Sarchii	Pârâul de Câmpie
Valea Satului	Crișul Alb
Valea Satului	Geamărtălui
Valea Satului	Iza
Valea Satului	Olt
Valea Saulei	Colentina
Valea Seacă	Topolița
Valea Șerpuița	Rusciori
Valea Șesii	Arieș
Valea spre Șardu	Niraj
Valea Stanciului	Săcuieu
Valea Țiganului	Bega
Valea Tocilelor	Cibin
Valea Vadului	Black Sea
Valea Vințului	Mureș
Valea Vinului	Someș
Valea Vinului	Vișeu
Valea Vițeilor	Barcău
Valea Vladului	Dâmbovița
Văleni	Arieș
Văleni	Iza
Vâlsan	Argeș
Vâltori	Ampoi
Vămășoaia	Bahlui
Vâna Mare	Lanca Birda
Vâna Mare	Timiș
Vâna Secănească	Timiș
Vânăta	Mostiștea
Var	Olt
Văratec	Strei
Vărbila	Cricovul Sărat
Vărbilău	Teleajen
Vârciorog	Topa
Vârciorova	Bistra
Vârghiș	Cormoș
Vărmaga	Mureș
Varnița	Miletin

River	Tributary of
Vărșag	Târnava Mare
Vârtej	Cotmeana
Varvizel	Bistra
Văsălat	Râul Doamnei
Vaser	Vișeu
Vasilat	Lotru
Vaslui	Bârlad
Vaslui	Oltișor
Văsui	Putna
Vața	Crișul Alb
Vâtroape	Someș
Vedea	Danube
Vedița	Vedea
Velju Mare	Corhana
Veljul Negreștilor	Velju Mare
Velna	Bârlad
Veneția	Olt
Vețca	Târnava Mică
Vicinic	Karaš
Vidra	Putna
Vii	Glavacioc
Viișoara	Prahova
Vinești	Mureș
Viroaga	Coțatcu
Vișa	Târnava Mare
Vișeu	Tisza
Viștea	Olt
Vițău	Putna
Vizăuți	Putna
Vlădila	Olt
Vladimir	Gilort
Vlașca	Teslui
Vlăsia	Cociovaliștea
Voievodeasa	Sucevița
Voineșița	Lotru
Voinești	Bahlui
Voiniceni	Mureș
Voitinel	Suceava
Voivodeasa	Toplița
Volovăț	Prut
Volovăț	Sucevița
Vornic	Bârzava
Vorona	Siret
Vorumloc	Târnava Mare
Vucova	Șurgani
Vulcana	Ialomița
Vulcănița	Homorod
Vutcani	Elan

== Z ==
River	Tributary of
Zăbala	Putna
Zăbala	Râul Negru
Zăbrăuț	Siret
Zagon	Covasna
Zahorna	Cracău
Zalău	Crasna

River	Tributary of
Zam	Mureș
Zănicel	Crasna
Zăpodie	Someșul Mic
Zârna	Râul Doamnei
Zăvoi	Hârtibaciu
Zboiul	Danube

River	Tributary of
Zebrac	Mureș
Zeletin	Bâsca Chiojdului
Zeletin	Berheci
Zemeș	Tazlăul Sărat
Zimbru	Crișul Alb
Zimoiaș	Ier

River	Tributary of
Zizin	Tărlung
Zlagna	Hârtibaciu
Zlast	Amaradia
Zlaști	Cerna
Zlata	Râul Mare
Zopana	Bega
