= Olt (river) =

River in Romania

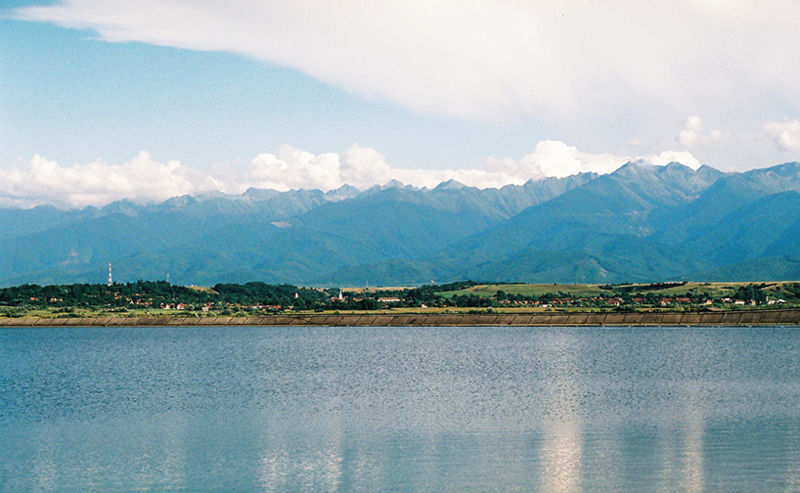
- The Avrig reservoir on the Olt

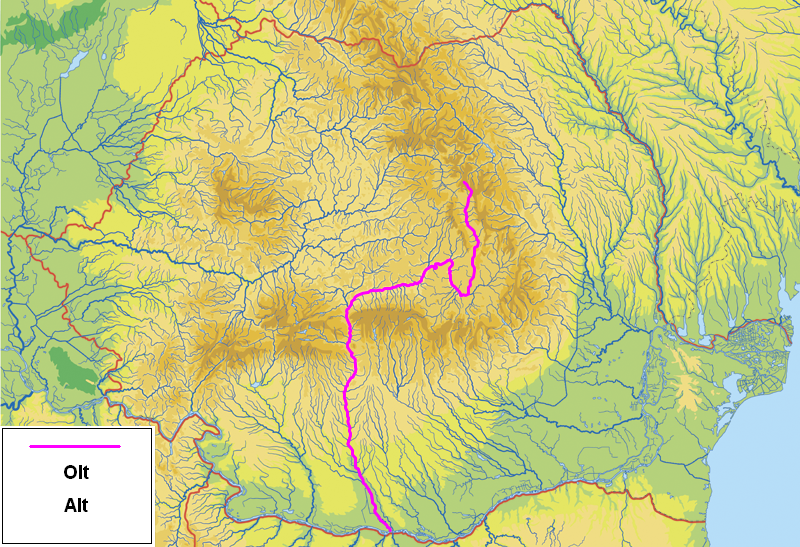

Location
- Country: Romania
- Counties: Harghita; Covasna; Brașov; Sibiu; Vâlcea; Olt; Teleorman
- Cities: Miercurea Ciuc; Sfântu Gheorghe; Râmnicu Vâlcea; Slatina

Physical characteristics
- Source: Hășmaș Mountains
  - location: Bălan, Harghita
  - elevation: 1,440 m (4,720 ft)
- Mouth: Danube
  - location: near Turnu Măgurele
  - coordinates: 43°42′46″N 24°48′1″E
- Length: 615 km (382 mi)
- Basin size: 24,050 km^{2} (9,290 sq mi)
- Discharge
  - location: mouth
  - average: 174 m^{3}/s (6,100 cu ft/s)

Basin features
- Progression: Danube→ Black Sea
- Tributaries
  - left: Râul Negru, Bârsa, Topolog
  - right: Cormoș, Cibin, Lotru, Olteț
- River code: VIII.1

The Olt (Romanian and Hungarian; German: Alt; Latin: Aluta or Alutus, Turkish: Oltu, Ancient Greek: Ἄλυτος Alytos) is a river in Romania. It is 615 km (382 mi) long, and its basin area is 24,050 km^{2} (9,290 sq mi). It is the longest river flowing exclusively through Romania. Its average discharge at the mouth is 174 m^{3}/s (6,100 cu ft/s). It originates in the Hășmaș Mountains of the eastern Carpathian Mountains, near Bălan, close to the headwaters of the river Mureș. The Olt flows through the Romanian counties of Harghita, Covasna, Brașov, Sibiu, Vâlcea, and Olt. The river was known as Alutus or Aluta in Roman antiquity. Olt County and the historical province of Oltenia are named after the river.

Sfântu Gheorghe, Râmnicu Vâlcea and Slatina are the main cities on the river Olt. The Olt flows into the Danube river near Turnu Măgurele.

== Settlements ==
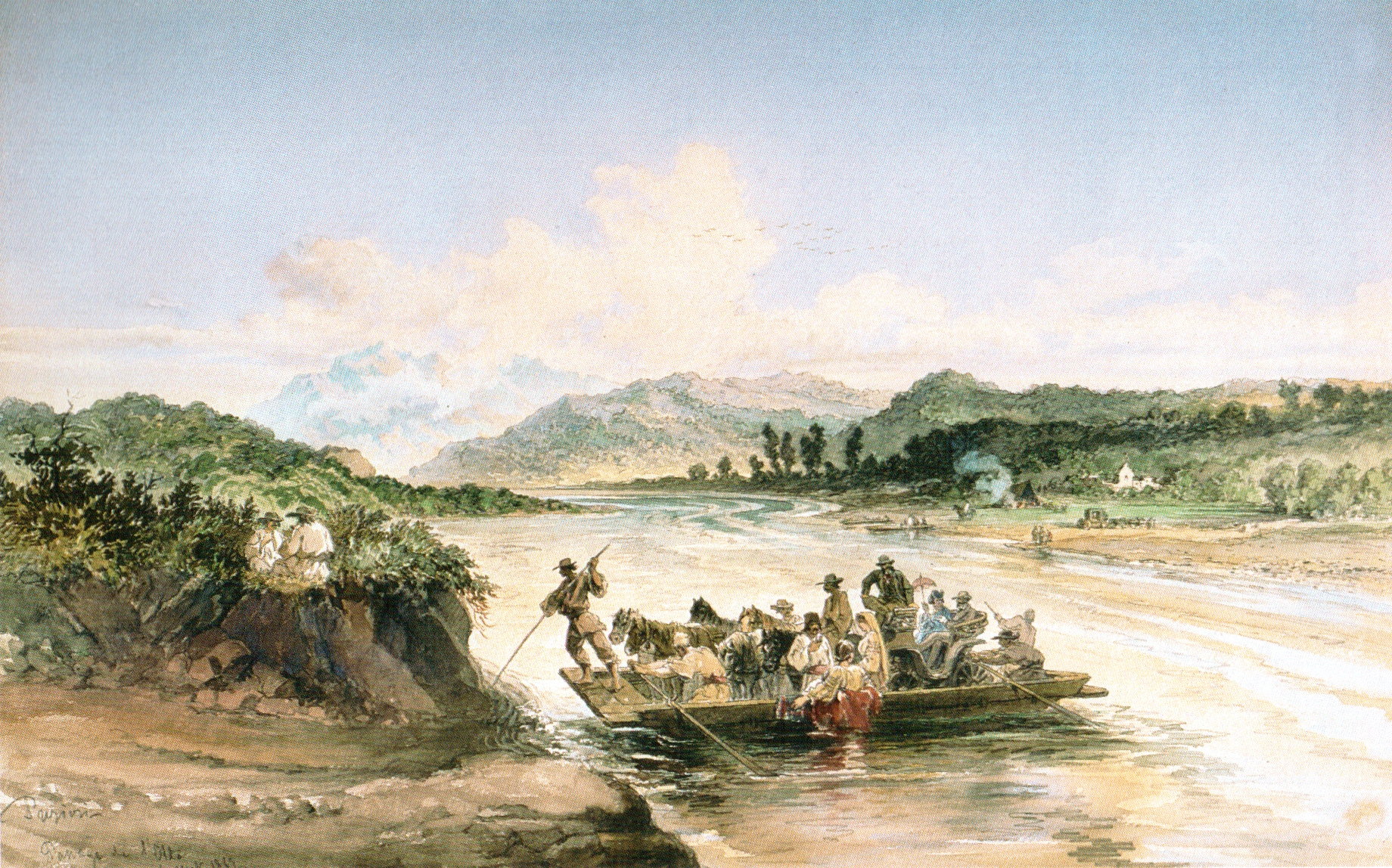
Crossing the Olt river, 1869 watercolor by Amedeo Preziosi

The main cities along the river Olt are Miercurea Ciuc, Sfântu Gheorghe, Făgăraș, Râmnicu Vâlcea and Slatina.

The Olt passes through the following communes, from source to mouth: Bălan, Sândominic, Tomești, Cârța, Dănești, Mădăraș, Racu, Siculeni, Ciceu, Miercurea Ciuc, Sâncrăieni, Sântimbru, Sânsimion, Tușnad, Băile Tușnad, Bixad, Micfalău, Malnaș, Bodoc, Ghidfalău, Sfântu Gheorghe, Ilieni, Prejmer, Hărman, Vâlcele, Bod, Feldioara, Hăghig, Măieruș, Belin, Apața, Aita Mare, Ormeniș, Baraolt, Augustin, Racoș, Hoghiz, Ungra, Comăna, Părău, Șercaia, Mândra, Făgăraș, Beclean, Voila, Viștea, Ucea, Arpașu de Jos, Cârța, Porumbacu de Jos, Avrig, Racovița, Tălmaciu, Turnu Roșu, Boița, Câineni, Racovița, Brezoi, Călimănești, Dăești, Bujoreni, Râmnicu Vâlcea, Budești, Mihăești, Galicea, Băbeni, Ionești, Olanu, Drăgoești, Orlești, Dobroteasa, Prundeni, Vulturești, Verguleasa, Drăgășani, Voicești, Teslui, Grădinari, Strejești, Curtișoara, Pleșoiu, Găneasa, Olt, Slatina, Slătioara, Milcov, Piatra-Olt, Brâncoveni, Ipotești, Osica de Sus, Coteana, Fălcoiu, Mărunței, Drăgănești-Olt, Fărcașele, Stoenești, Dăneasa, Gostavățu, Sprâncenata, Băbiciu, Scărișoara, Rusănești, Cilieni, Tia Mare, Izbiceni, Lunca, Giuvărăști and Islaz.

== Tributaries ==
The following rivers are tributaries of the river Olt (from source to mouth):

- Left: Mediaș, Fântâna lui Gal, Sedloco, Babașa, Șoarecu, Cad, Racul, Nicolești, Delnița, Pustnic, Fitod, Fișag, Tușnad, Vârghiș, Valea Roșie, Micfalău, Pârâul Urșilor, Malnaș, Hereț, Talomir, Râul Negru, Valea Neagră, Ghimbășel, Bârsa, Homorod (Ciucaș), Crizbav, Valea Cetății (Rotbav), Valea Seacă, Hotaru, Măieruș, Bozom, Valea Lungă, Remetea, Ormeniș, Top, Valea Cetății (Racoș), Valea Mare, Bogata, Lupșa, Comana, Veneția, Părău, Găvan, Șercaia, Urăsa, Mândra, Iaz, Sebeș, Racovița, Hurez, Săvăstreni, Netot, Dridif, Breaza, Sâmbăta, Racovița, Drăguș, Hotarul, Viștea, Corbul Viștei, Corbul Ucei, Ucea, Racovița, Gârlățel, Gostaia, Arpaș, Valea Neagră, Cârțișoara, Opat, Scorei, Sărata, Porumbacu, Avrig, Mârșa, Racovița, Sebeș, Strâmba, Rândibou, Curpăn, Valea Satului, Boia Mare, Pârâul Sec, Băiaș, Lotrișor, Văratica, Păușa, Valea Satului, Sălătrucel, Alunoasa, Valea Satului, Sâmnic, Aninoasa, Pârâul Ruzii, Topolog, Ursana, Stăneasa, Geamăna, Cungra, Sterpul, Cepturaru, Surduiu, Cungrișoara, Recea, Racovăț, Teslui, Strehareți, Milcov, Cinculeasa, Oboga, Dârjov, Iminog
- Right: Sipoș, Lunca Mare, Lunca, Modicea, Mădărașul Mare, Șopot, Var, Segheș, Știuca, Beta, Capolnaș, Techera, Valea Mare, Chendreș, Valea Merilor, Chereș, Pârâul Mare, Mitaci, Răchitiș, Calnic, Valea Crișului, Arcuș, Valea Porumbelor, Debren, Valea Sâmbrezii, Ilieni, Baciu, Vâlcele, Hăghig, Iarăș, Corlat, Belinul Mare, Valea Adânca, Aita, Valea Mateiașului, Pârâul Adânc, Căpeni (Chepeț), Baraolt, Cormoș, Pârâul Sărat, Homorod, Dăișoara, Crăița, Ticuș, Felmer, Galați, Poenița, Cincu, Golbav, Pârâul Nou, Valea Fermelor, Brad, Cibin, Pleașa, Megieș, Lotrioara, Vad, Valea Largă, Valea lui Vlad, Uria, Robești, Sărăcinești, Călinești, Lotru, Lotrișor, Căciulata, Valea Căldărilor, Muereasca, Bujoreanca, Olănești, Pârâul Sărat, Govora, Focșa, Bistrița, Luncavăț, Nisipoasa, Pesceana, Oporelu Canal, Oltișor, Olteț, Teslui, Caracal, Vlădila, Suhat, Crușov

== Dams ==
For supply of drinking water and water for irrigation and for the production of hydroelectricity, 44 reservoirs have been built in the Olt river basin. There are 24 reservoirs for hydropower on the river Olt itself, and three on its tributary the Lotru. The hydropower plants on the river Olt are (from source to mouth): Voila, Viștea, Arpaș, Scoreiu, Avrig, Gura Lotrului, Turnu, Călimănești, Dăești, Râmnicu Vâlcea, Râureni, Govora, Băbeni, Ionești, Zăvideni, Drăgășani, Strejești, Arcești, Slatina, Ipotești, Drăgănești, Frunzaru, Rusănești and Izbiceni. The total energy production of the 43 hydropower plants in the Olt basin was 2,980 GWh in 1996.

== Clickable map of the (ro:Defileul Oltului)/(en:Olt Defile) drainage basin ==
Interactive map of the Olt Defile drainage basin. (Click on the desired quadrant.)

== Gallery ==
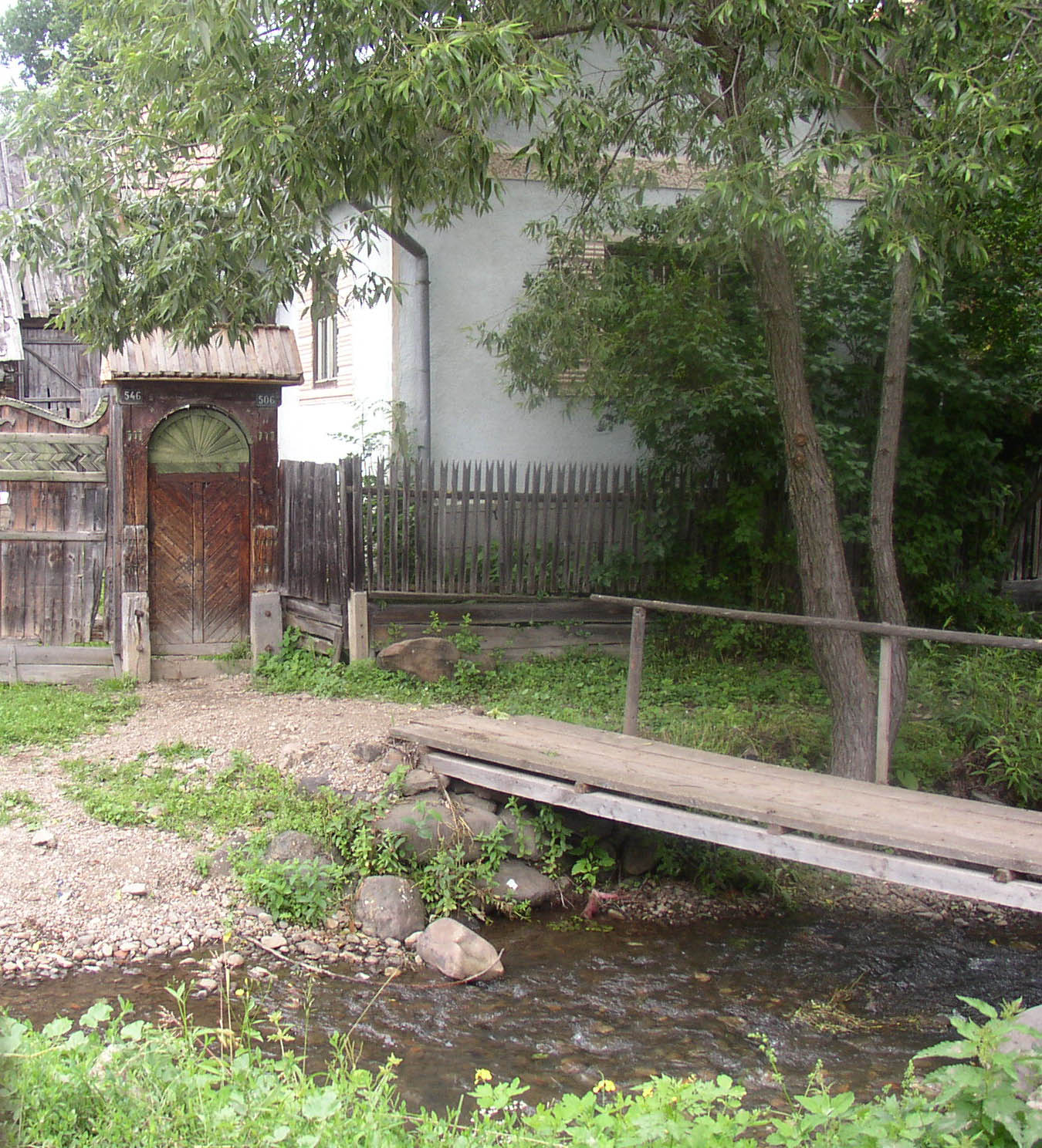
Olt – Close to the source, at Siculeni

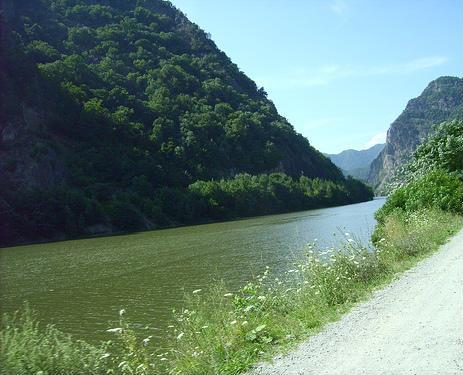
The Olt River at Turnu Roșu

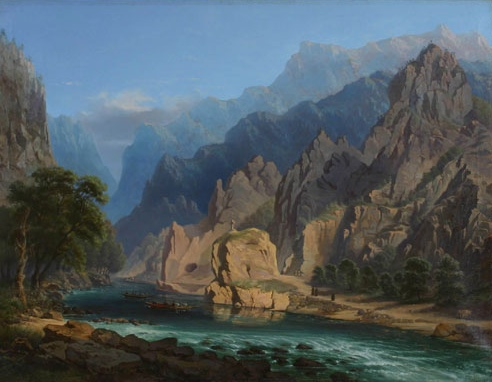
Carol Popp de Szathmary, Olt Valley

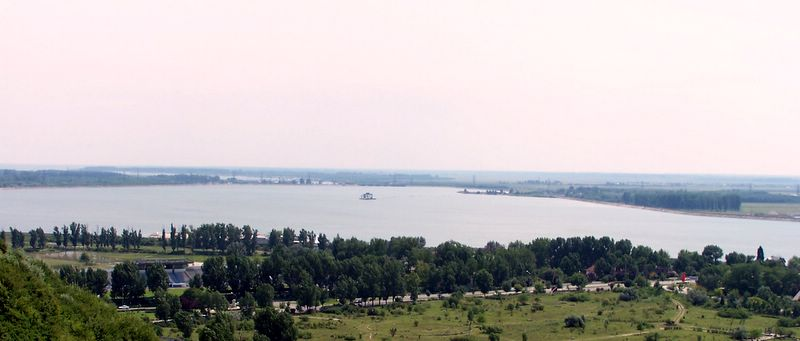
Slatina storage reservoir on the Olt river

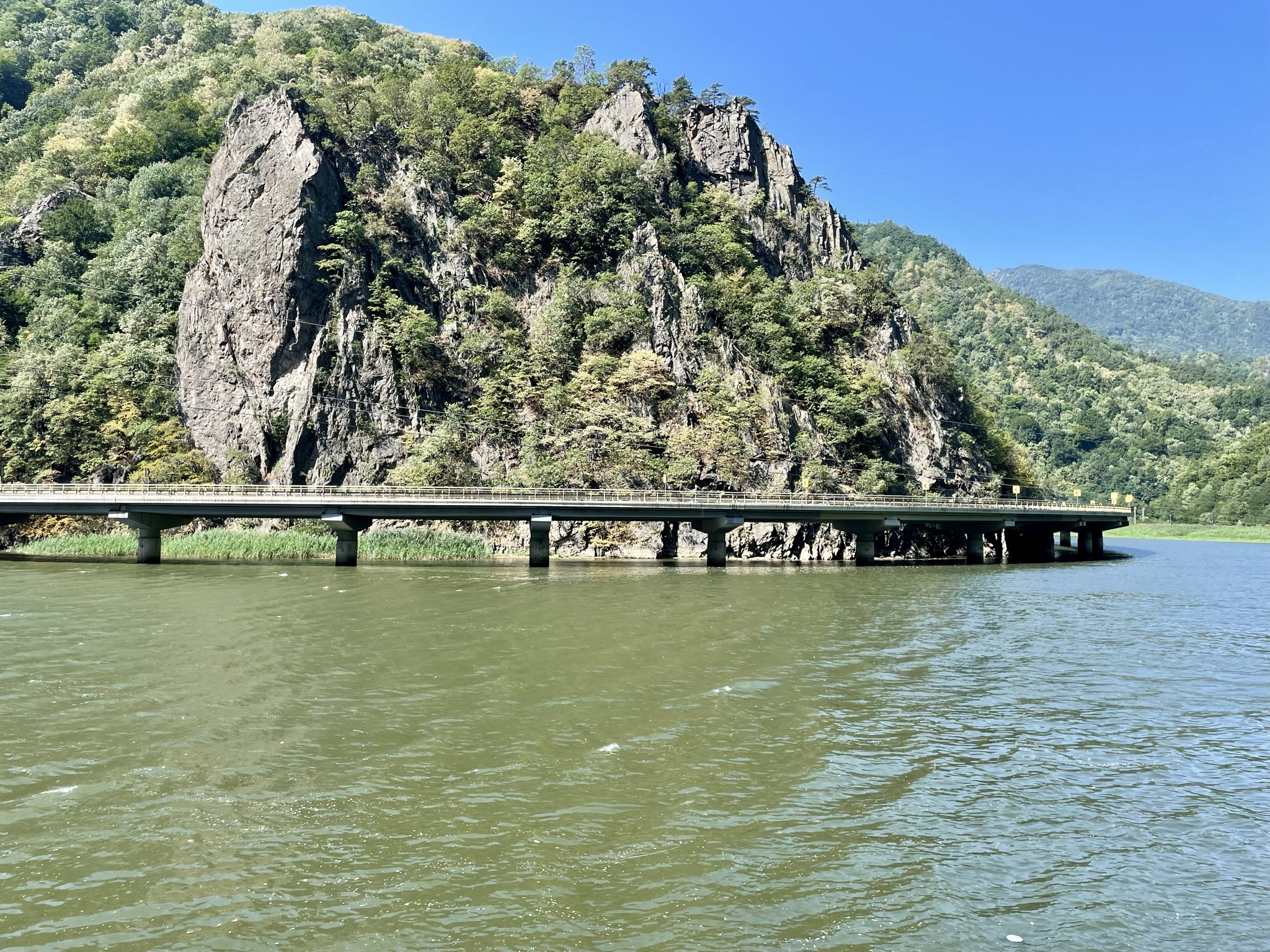
The bridge along the Olt river in the course of DN7 road

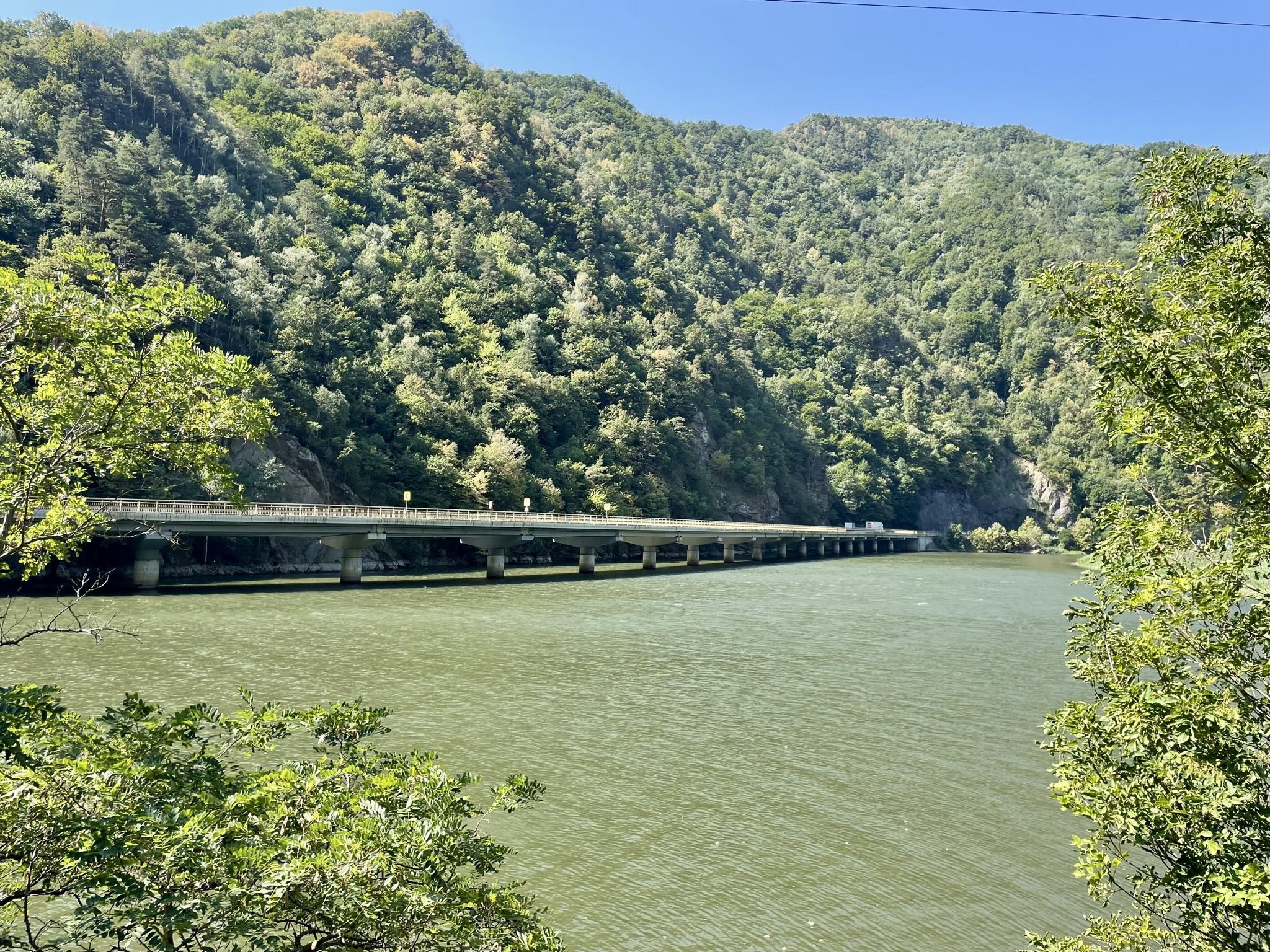
The bridge along the Olt river in the course of DN7 road
- More pictures: Raft ride (rafting) on Olt

== See also ==
- Olt Defile
- Limes Alutanus
