= Stăneasa =

- Location within Romania

Location
- Country: Romania
- Counties: Vâlcea County
- Villages: Izvoru Rece, Balomireasa, Stănești, Drăgioiu

Physical characteristics
- Mouth: Olt
  - coordinates: 44.8505°N 24.2558°E
- Length: 22 km (14 mi)
- Basin size: 107 km^{2} (41 sq mi)

Basin features
- Progression: Olt→ Danube→ Black Sea
- Tributaries
  - left: Trepteanca

The Stăneasa (also: Stăneasca) is a left tributary of the river Olt in Romania. It flows into the Olt near Olanu. Its length is 22 km (14 mi) and its basin size is 107 km^{2} (41 sq mi).
