= Sâncrai =

Sâncrai may refer to several places in Romania:

- Sâncrai, a village now part of Câmpia Turzii
- Sâncrai, a district in the town of Călan, Hunedoara County
- Sâncrai, a district in the city of Aiud, Alba County
- Sâncrai, a village in Ilieni Commune, Covasna County
- Sâncrai, a village in Dealu Commune, Harghita County

== See also ==
- Sâncraiu (disambiguation)
