= Trepteanca =

- Location within Romania

Location
- Country: Romania
- Counties: Olt, Vâlcea
- Villages: Dobrești, Trepteni, Olanu

Physical characteristics
- Mouth: Stăneasa
  - location: Olanu
  - coordinates: 44.8612°N 24.2507°E
- Length: 30 km (19 mi)
- Basin size: 71 km^{2} (27 sq mi)

Basin features
- Progression: Stăneasa→ Olt→ Danube→ Black Sea
- River code: VIII.1.154.1

The Trepteanca is a left tributary of the river Stăneasa in Romania. Formerly a direct tributary of the Olt, it flows into the Stăneasa near Olanu. Its length is 30 km (19 mi) and its basin size is 71 km^{2} (27 sq mi).
