= Porumbacu =

Porumbacu may refer to:

- Porumbacu de Jos, a commune in Sibiu County, Romania
- Porumbacu de Sus, a village in the commune Porumbacu de Jos, Sibiu County, Romania
- Porumbacu (river), a river in Sibiu County, Romania
- Veronica Porumbacu, a Romanian poet
