= Robești =

Robești may refer to several places in Romania:

- Robești, a village in Sohodol Commune, Alba County
- Robești, a village in Pârscov Commune, Buzău County
- Robești, a village in Câineni Commune, Vâlcea County
- Robești (river), a tributary of the Olt in Vâlcea County
