= Iacob =

Iacob or Iacov is the Romanian form for Jacob and James and it may refer to:

== People ==
- Alexandru Iacob (born 1989), Romanian footballer
- Caius Iacob (1912–1992), Romanian mathematician
- Iacob Felix (1832–1905), Romanian physician
- Iacob Iacobovici (1879–1959), Romanian surgeon
- Mihai Iacob (1933–2009), Romanian film director and screenwriter
- Monica Iacob Ridzi (born 1977), Romanian politician and Member of the European Parliament
- Paul Iacob (born 1996), Romanian footballer
- Victoraș Iacob (born 1980), Romanian footballer
- Ioan Iacob Heraclid (1511–1563), Greek soldier and ruler of Moldavia from 1561 to 1563

== Geography ==
- Iacob River, tributary of the Putna River in Romania
- Pârâul lui Iacob, tributary of the Asău River in Romania
- Valea lui Iacob River, tributary of the Râul Vadului in Romania
