= Muereasca (river) =

- Location within Romania

Location
- Country: Romania
- Counties: Vâlcea County
- Villages: Andreiești, Muereasca de Sus, Muereasca, Hotarele

Physical characteristics
- Mouth: Olt
  - location: Gura Văii
  - coordinates: 45.1736°N 24.3666°E
- Length: 19 km (12 mi)
- Basin size: 50 km^{2} (19 sq mi)

Basin features
- Progression: Olt→ Danube→ Black Sea
- Tributaries
  - left: Pălăoaia
  - right: Dosu, Fântâna Tulbure

The Muereasca is a right tributary of the river Olt in Romania. It flows into the Olt in Gura Văii. Its length is 19 km (12 mi) and its basin size is 50 km^{2} (19 sq mi).
