= Izvoru Rece =

Izvoru Rece may refer to several villages in Romania:

- Izvoru Rece, a district in the city of Craiova, Dolj County
- Izvoru Rece, a village in Stoilești Commune, Vâlcea County
- Izvoru Rece, a village in Vaideeni Commune, Vâlcea County
