= Cepturaru =

- Location within Romania

Location
- Country: Romania
- Counties: Olt County
- Villages: Vlăngărești

Physical characteristics
- Mouth: Olt
  - coordinates: 44.7059°N 24.2866°E
- Length: 11 km (6.8 mi)
- Basin size: 21 km^{2} (8.1 sq mi)

Basin features
- Progression: Olt→ Danube→ Black Sea
- River code: VIII.1.160

The Cepturaru is a left tributary of the river Olt in Romania. It flows into the Olt in Valea lui Alb. Its length is 11 km (6.8 mi) and its basin size is 21 km^{2} (8.1 sq mi).
