= Olt Defile =

Mountain pass in Romania

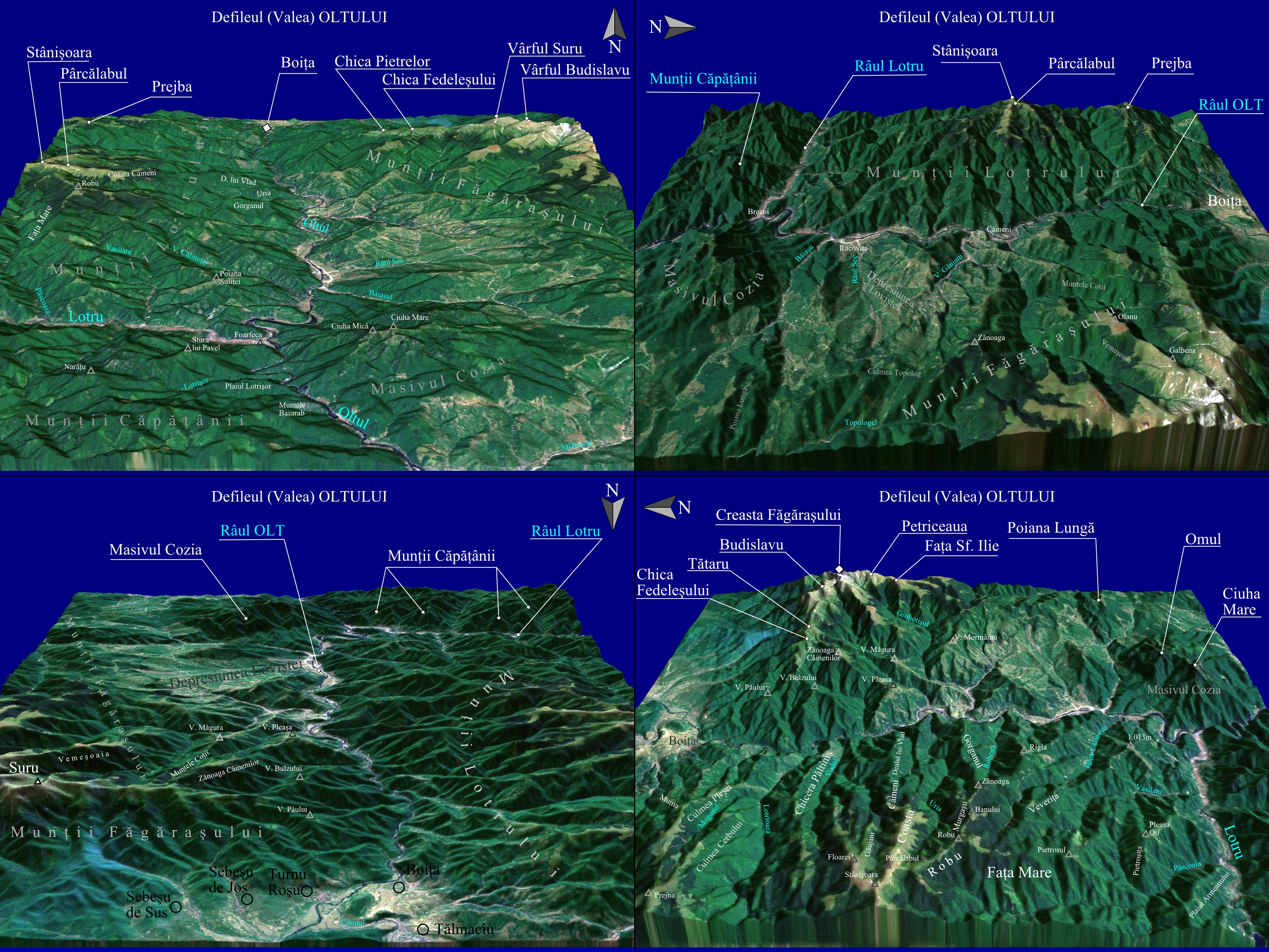
Olt Defile Map

The Olt Defile (Romanian: Defileul Oltului) is a defile that has been cut into the Transyvanian Alps in south-central Romania by the river Olt. In the Brezoi–Titești Depression portion of the defile there are located hot spring resorts. In the surrounding mountains grow walnut and oak trees, wild roses, and white ivy. Transportation is provided by highways and railways between Râmnicu Vâlcea and Sibiu.

== History ==
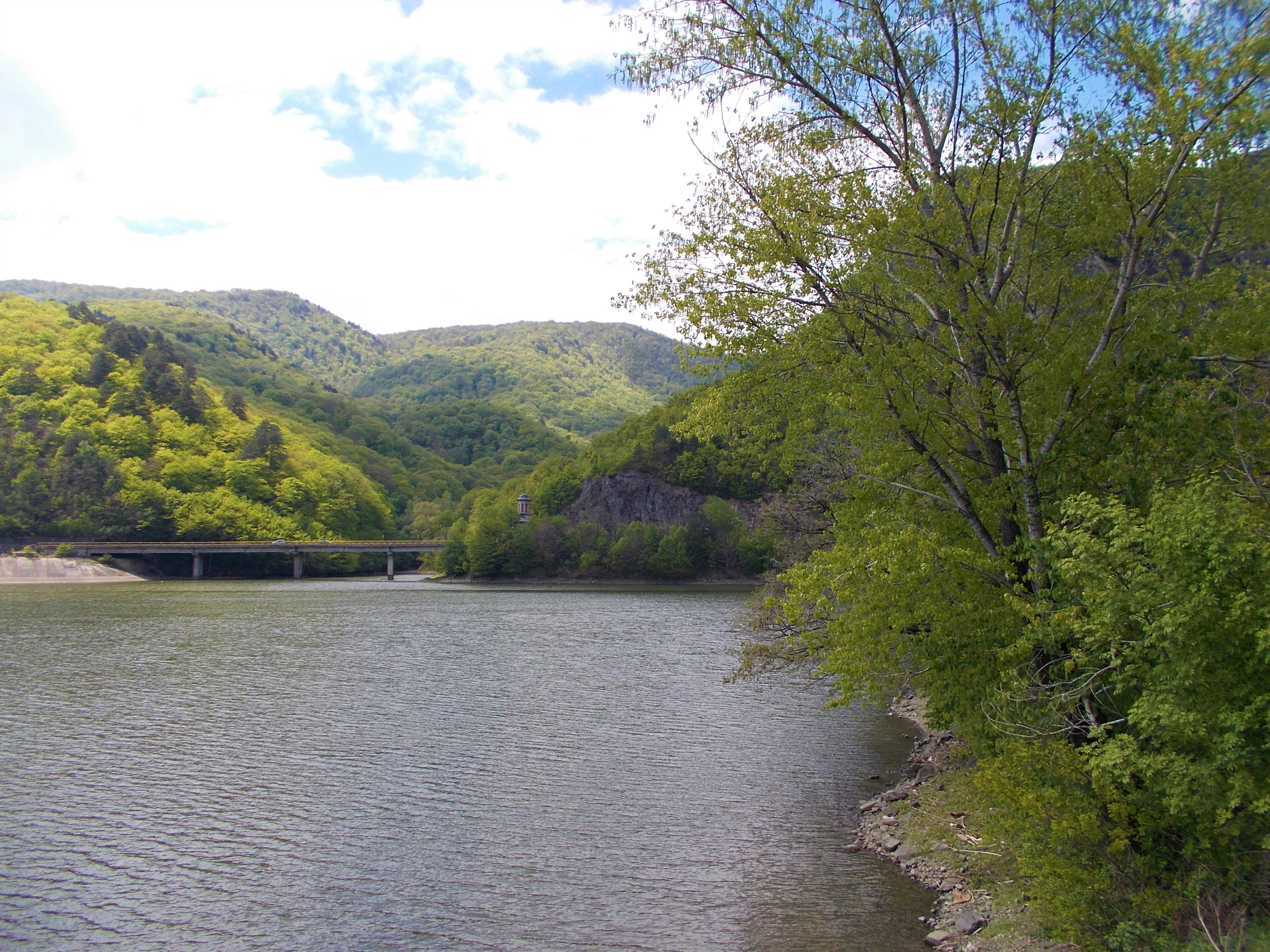
The Olt Defile, Cozia, Vâlcea County

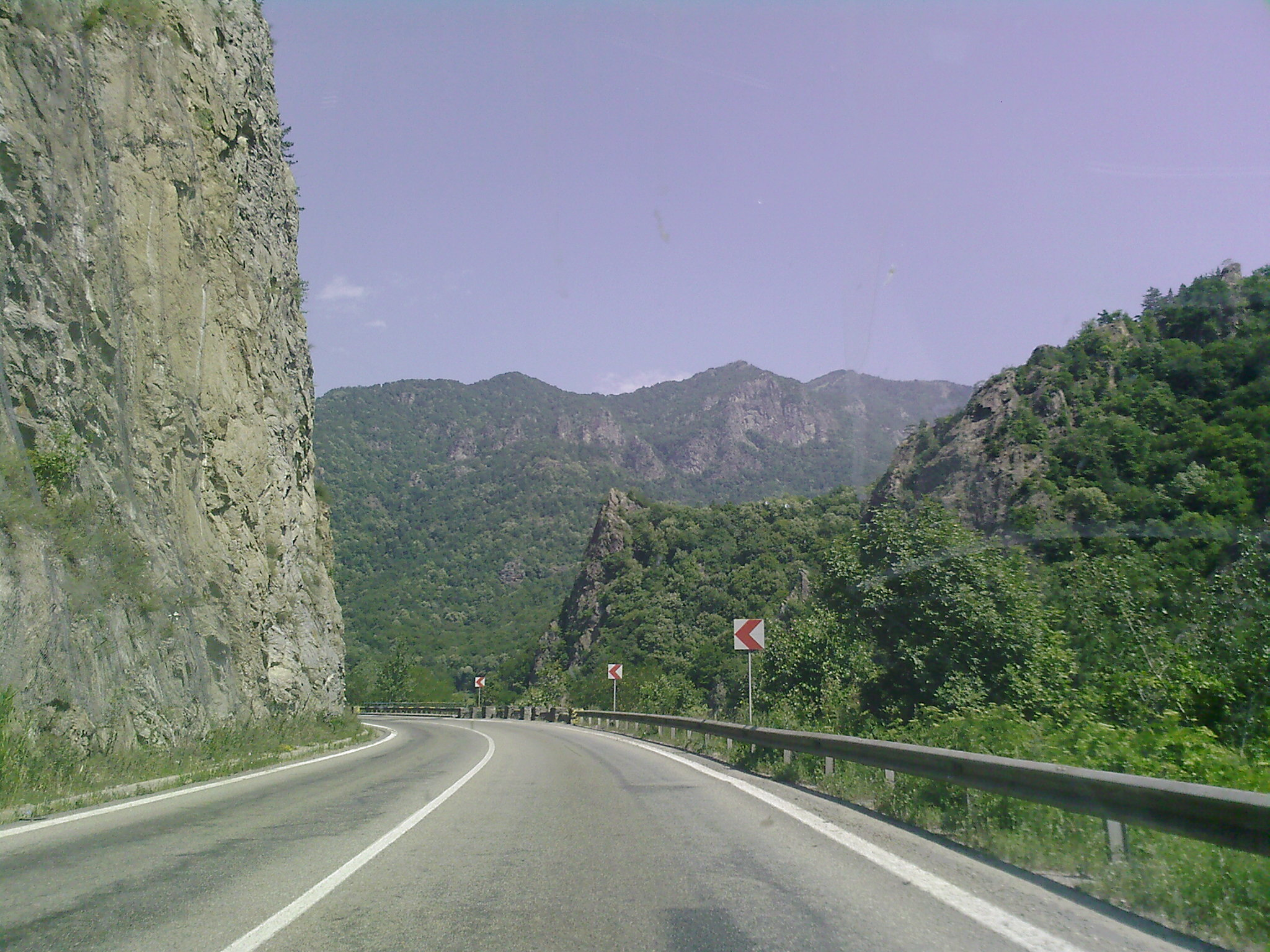
The E81 road going through the Olt Defile

The defile was important when Rome occupied the area during the 1st century BC to 2nd century AD, building roads and fortifications along the Olt to north of the Danube. This line of fortifications was known as the Limes Alutanus, which once marked the eastern frontier of Roman Dacia. Remains of these Roman castra have been found in several villages, including those of Boița, Câineni, and Călimănești. From the 14th to 18th century, several monasteries were built in the area. One of these, Turnul Monastery from the 17th century, even had cells that were carved into the cliffs by hermits from the 14th century Cozia Monastery, which was known for its exterior frescoes. The Ostrov Hermitage, also in the area, dates from the 17th century, while the Cornet Hermitage was built during the 17th and 18th centuries. There are also two fortresses, dating from the 16th century, located in Turnu Roșu and Boița.

== Clickable map of the (ro:Defileul Oltului)/(en:Olt Defile) drainage basin ==
Interactive map of the Olt Defile drainage basin. (Click on the desired quadrant.)
