= Dosu =

Dosu may refer to:

- Dosu Joseph (born 1973), Nigerian football player
- Dosu River, Romania
