= Baciu (Olt) =

- Location within Romania

Location
- Country: Romania
- Counties: Covasna County
- Villages: Dobolii de Jos

Physical characteristics
- Mouth: Olt
  - location: Dobolii de Jos
  - coordinates: 45.7660°N 25.7667°E
- Length: 10 km (6.2 mi)
- Basin size: 18 km^{2} (6.9 sq mi)

Basin features
- Progression: Olt→ Danube→ Black Sea

The Baciu is a right tributary of the river Olt in Romania. It discharges into the Olt in Dobolii de Jos. Its length is 10 km (6.2 mi) and its basin size is 18 km^{2} (6.9 sq mi).
