= Nisipoasa =

- Location within Romania

Location
- Country: Romania
- Counties: Vâlcea County
- Villages: Scundu, Orlești

Physical characteristics
- Mouth: Olt
  - location: Aurești
  - coordinates: 44.7801°N 24.2667°E
- Length: 19 km (12 mi)
- Basin size: 66 km^{2} (25 sq mi)

Basin features
- Progression: Olt→ Danube→ Black Sea
- Tributaries
  - left: Guguianca

The Nisipoasa is a right tributary of the Olt in Romania. It flows into the Olt in Aurești. Its length is 19 km (12 mi) and its basin size is 66 km^{2} (25 sq mi).
