= Bixad =

Bixad may refer to several places in Romania:

- Bixad, Covasna, a commune in Covasna County
- Bixad, Satu Mare, a commune in Satu Mare County
