= Dobolii =

Dobolii may refer to one of two places in Covasna County, Romania:

- Dobolii de Jos, a village in Ilieni Commune
- Dobolii de Sus, a village in Boroșneu Mare Commune
