= Silea (disambiguation) =

Silea may refer to several people or places:

- Silea, a comune in Italy
- Şilea, a village in Fărău Commune, Alba County, Romania
- Silea, a village in Orlești Commune, Vâlcea County, Romania
