= Uria (river) =

- Location within Romania

Location
- Country: Romania
- Counties: Vâlcea County

Physical characteristics
- Mouth: Olt
  - location: Câinenii Mari
  - coordinates: 45.5006°N 24.2926°E
- Length: 16 km (9.9 mi)
- Basin size: 36 km^{2} (14 sq mi)

Basin features
- Progression: Olt→ Danube→ Black Sea
- Tributaries
  - right: Sașa Mândra, Murgaș, Fericea

The Uria (in its upper course also: Lupul) is a right tributary of the river Olt in Romania. It flows into the Olt in Câinenii Mari. Its length is 16 km (9.9 mi) and its basin size is 36 km^{2} (14 sq mi).
