= Jangu River =

Jangu River may refer to:

- Jangu, a tributary of the Râul Doamnei in Argeș County
- Jangu, a tributary of the Robești in Vâlcea County
