= Pârâul Satului =

Pârâul Satului may refer to the following rivers in Romania:

- Pârâul Satului, a tributary of the Tăcășele in Arad County
- Pârâul Satului, a tributary of the Hăghig in Covasna County
- Pârâul Satului, a tributary of the Râul Negru in Covasna County
