= Arcuș (river) =

- Location within Romania

Location
- Country: Romania
- Counties: Covasna County
- Villages: Arcuș

Physical characteristics
- Mouth: Olt
  - coordinates: 45.8810°N 25.8130°E
- Length: 14 km (8.7 mi)
- Basin size: 29 km^{2} (11 sq mi)

Basin features
- Progression: Olt→ Danube→ Black Sea
- Tributaries
  - left: Valea Umbrei, Valea Răpoasă
  - right: Șugaș

The Arcuș (Hungarian: Árkos-patak) is a right tributary of the river Olt in Romania. It discharges into the Olt near the city Sfântu Gheorghe. Its length is 14 km (8.7 mi) and its basin size is 29 km^{2} (11 sq mi).
