= Hăghig =

- Commune
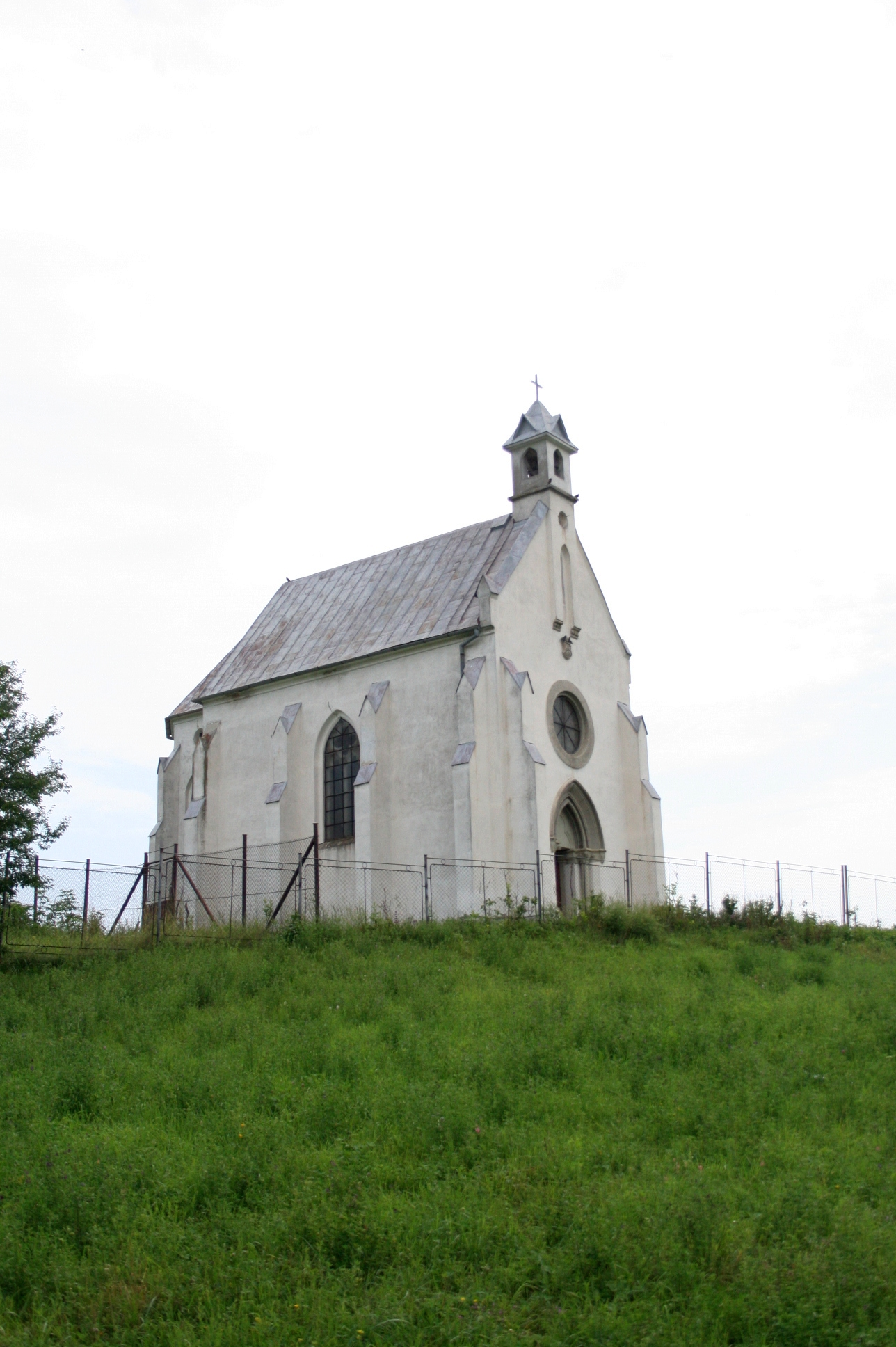
- Nemes family cappella in Hăghig

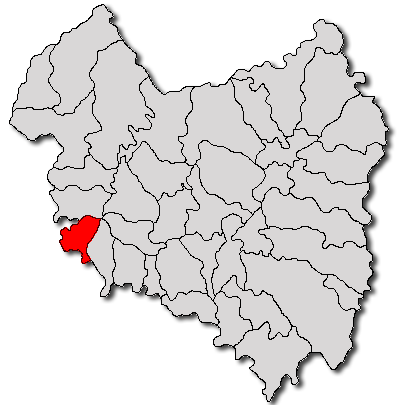
- Location in Covasna County

- Location in Romania
- Coordinates: 45°50′N 25°35′E
- Country: Romania
- County: Covasna

Government
  - Mayor (2020–2024): Alexandru Cucu (PSD)
- Area: 30.18 km^{2} (11.65 sq mi)
- Elevation: 506 m (1,660 ft)
- Population (2021-12-01): 2,368
  - Density: 78.46/km^{2} (203.2/sq mi)
- Time zone: UTC+02:00 (EET)
  - Summer (DST): UTC+03:00 (EEST)
- Postal code: 527100
- Area code: (+40) 02 67
- Vehicle reg.: CV
- Website: primariahaghig.ro

Hăghig (Hungarian: Hídvég, Hungarian pronunciation: [ˈhiːdveːɡ]; German: Fürstenberg or Fürstenburg) is a commune in Covasna County, Transylvania, Romania composed of two villages: Hăghig and Iarăș (Nyáraspatak).

== Geography ==
The commune is located in the southeastern part of Covasna County, 22 km (14 mi) west of the county seat, Sfântu Gheorghe, on the border with Brașov County. It is situated at an altitude of 506 m (1,660 ft), on the banks of the Olt River and its right tributary, the river Hăghig.

Hăghig is crossed by national road DN13E, which starts in Întorsura Buzăului, in the south of the county, passes through Covasna and Sfântu Gheorghe, and ends in Feldioara, 4 km (2.5 mi) to the south, across the Olt River.

== Demographics ==
Historical population
Year	Pop.	±%
1850	1,904	—
1920	2,353	+23.6%
1977	2,372	+0.8%
2002	2,223	−6.3%
2011	2,315	+4.1%
2021	2,368	+2.3%
Source: Census data

The commune has an ethnically mixed population. According to the 2011 census, it had a population of 2,315, of which 41.18% were Romanians, 30.55% Roma, and 28.12% Székely Hungarians. At the 2021 census, it had a population of 2,368, of which 44.76% were Romanians, 31.76% Roma, and 18.71% Székely Hungarians.
