= Porumbacu (river) =

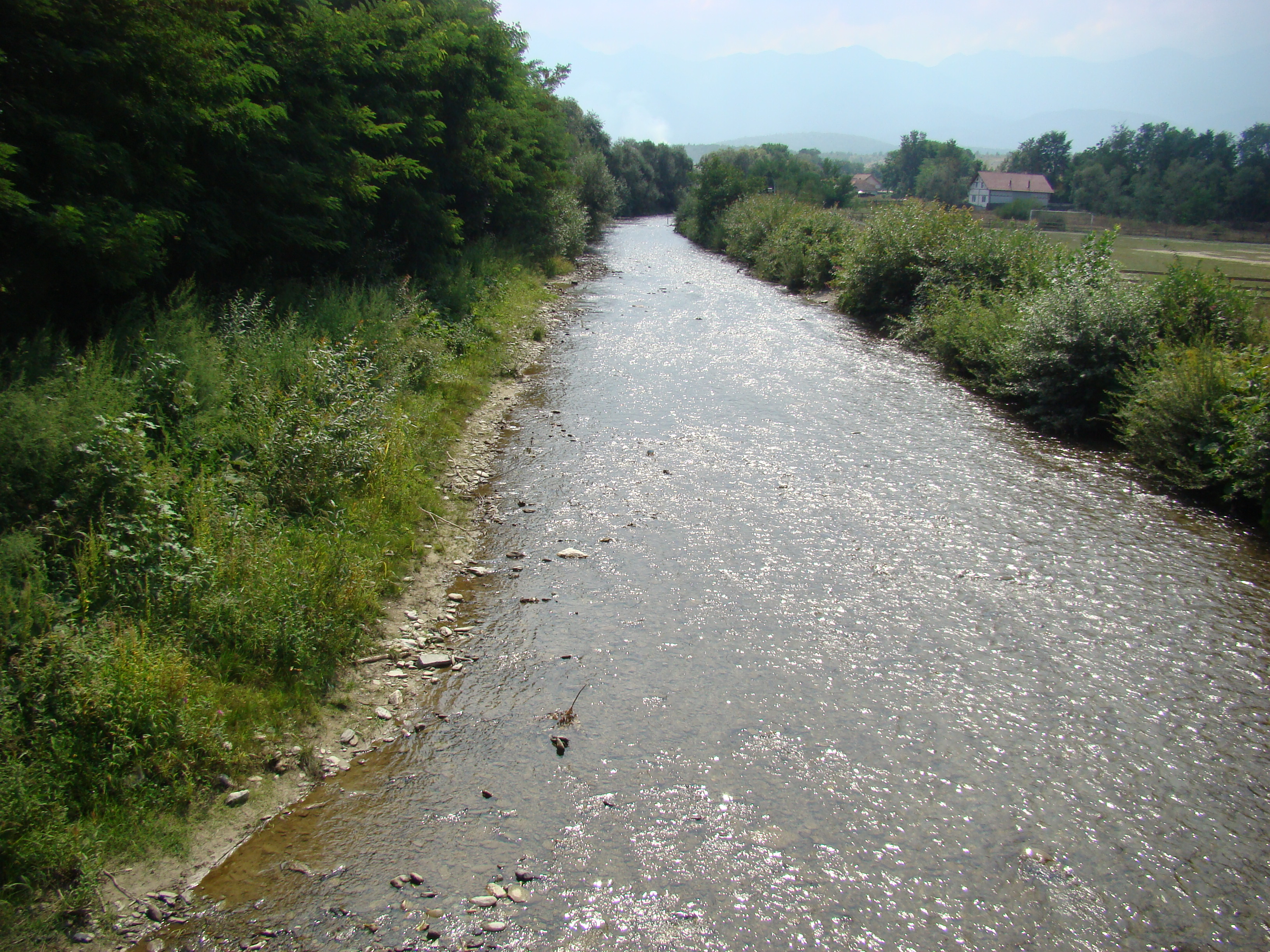
- The Porumbacu near Porumbacu de Sus

- Location within Romania

Location
- Country: Romania
- Counties: Sibiu County
- Villages: Porumbacu de Sus, Porumbacu de Jos

Physical characteristics
- Source: Făgăraș Mountains
- Mouth: Olt
  - location: Porumbacu de Jos
  - coordinates: 45.7674°N 24.4373°E
- Length: 27 km (17 mi)
- Basin size: 80 km^{2} (31 sq mi)
- Discharge
  - location: *
  - average: 1.72 m^{3}/s (61 cu ft/s)

Basin features
- Progression: Olt→ Danube→ Black Sea
- Tributaries
  - left: Șerbota, Porumbăcel, Lișcov
  - right: Tunsu

The Porumbacu (in its upper course also: Valea Sărății and Valea Mare) is a left tributary of the river Olt in Romania. It discharges into the Olt in Porumbacu de Jos. The Porumbacu originates on the northern slope of Negoiu Peak, Făgăraș Mountains. Its length is 27 km (17 mi) and its basin size is 80 km^{2} (31 sq mi).
