= Băbiciu =

- Commune
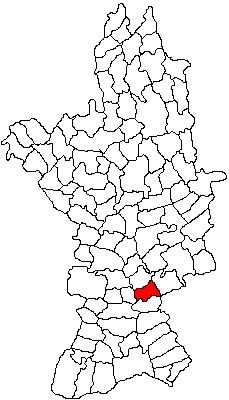
- Location in Olt County

- Location in Romania
- Coordinates: 44°2′N 24°34′E
- Country: Romania
- County: Olt

Government
  - Mayor (2020–2024): Florea Negrilă (PSD)
- Area: 29.75 km^{2} (11.49 sq mi)
- Population (2021-12-01): 1,844
  - Density: 62/km^{2} (160/sq mi)
- Time zone: EET/EEST (UTC+2/+3)
- Postal code: 237015
- Vehicle reg.: OT
- Website: www.primariababiciu.ro

Băbiciu is a commune in Olt County, Oltenia, Romania. It is composed of a single village, Băbiciu.

The commune is located in the southeastern part of the county, on the right bank of the Olt River.
