= Arcuș =

Arcuș Árkos
- Commune
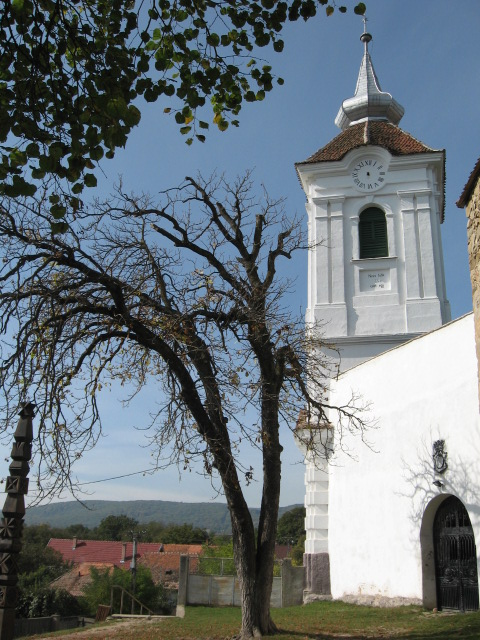
- Unitarian Church

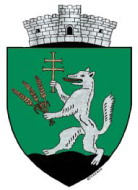
- Coat of arms

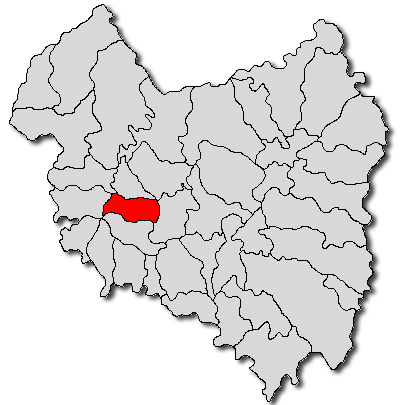
- Location in Covasna County

- Location in Romania
- Coordinates: 45°54′N 25°46′E
- Country: Romania
- County: Covasna

Government
  - Mayor (2020–2024): Árpád Máthé (UDMR)
- Area: 33.53 km^{2} (12.95 sq mi)
- Elevation: 573 m (1,880 ft)
- Population (2021-12-01): 1,722
  - Density: 51.36/km^{2} (133.0/sq mi)
- Time zone: UTC+02:00 (EET)
  - Summer (DST): UTC+03:00 (EEST)
- Postal code: 527166
- Area code: +(40) x67
- Vehicle reg.: CV
- Website: primariaarcus.ro

Arcuș (Hungarian: Árkos [ˈaːrkoʃ]) is a commune in Covasna County, Transylvania, Romania. Composed of a single village, Arcuș, it became an independent commune when it split from Valea Crișului in 2004. Arcuș previously formed part of the Székely Land region of the historical Transylvania province.

== Geography ==
The commune lies in a hilly area between the Baraolt and the Bodoc mountains, at an altitude of 573 m (1,880 ft), on the banks of the river Arcuș. It is located in the central-west part of the county, 6 km (3.7 mi) north of the county seat, Sfântu Gheorghe.

Arcuș is crossed by the county road DJ121B, which runs from Sfântu Gheorghe to Valea Crișului, where it ends in DJ121A. The Arcuș train station serves the CFR Main Line 400, which connects Brașov with the northwestern city of Satu Mare.

== Demographics ==
The commune has a Székely Hungarian majority. According to the 2011 census, it had a population of 1,527, of which 96.2% or 1,469 were Hungarian. At the 2021 census, Arcuș had a population of 1,722; of those, 88.56% were Hungarians and 4.82% Romanians.
