= Vlădila (river) =

- Location within Romania

Location
- Country: Romania
- Counties: Olt County
- Villages: Vlădila, Traian, Scărișoara

Physical characteristics
- Mouth: Olt
  - coordinates: 43.9917°N 24.5848°E
- Length: 37 km (23 mi)
- Basin size: 241 km^{2} (93 sq mi)

Basin features
- Progression: Olt→ Danube→ Black Sea
- Tributaries
  - left: Redea
- River code: VIII.1.177

The Vlădila is a right tributary of the river Olt in Romania. It flows into the Olt in Scărișoara. Its length is 37 km (23 mi) and its basin size is 241 km^{2} (93 sq mi).
