= Valea Satului (Olt) =

Valea Satului Valea Coții
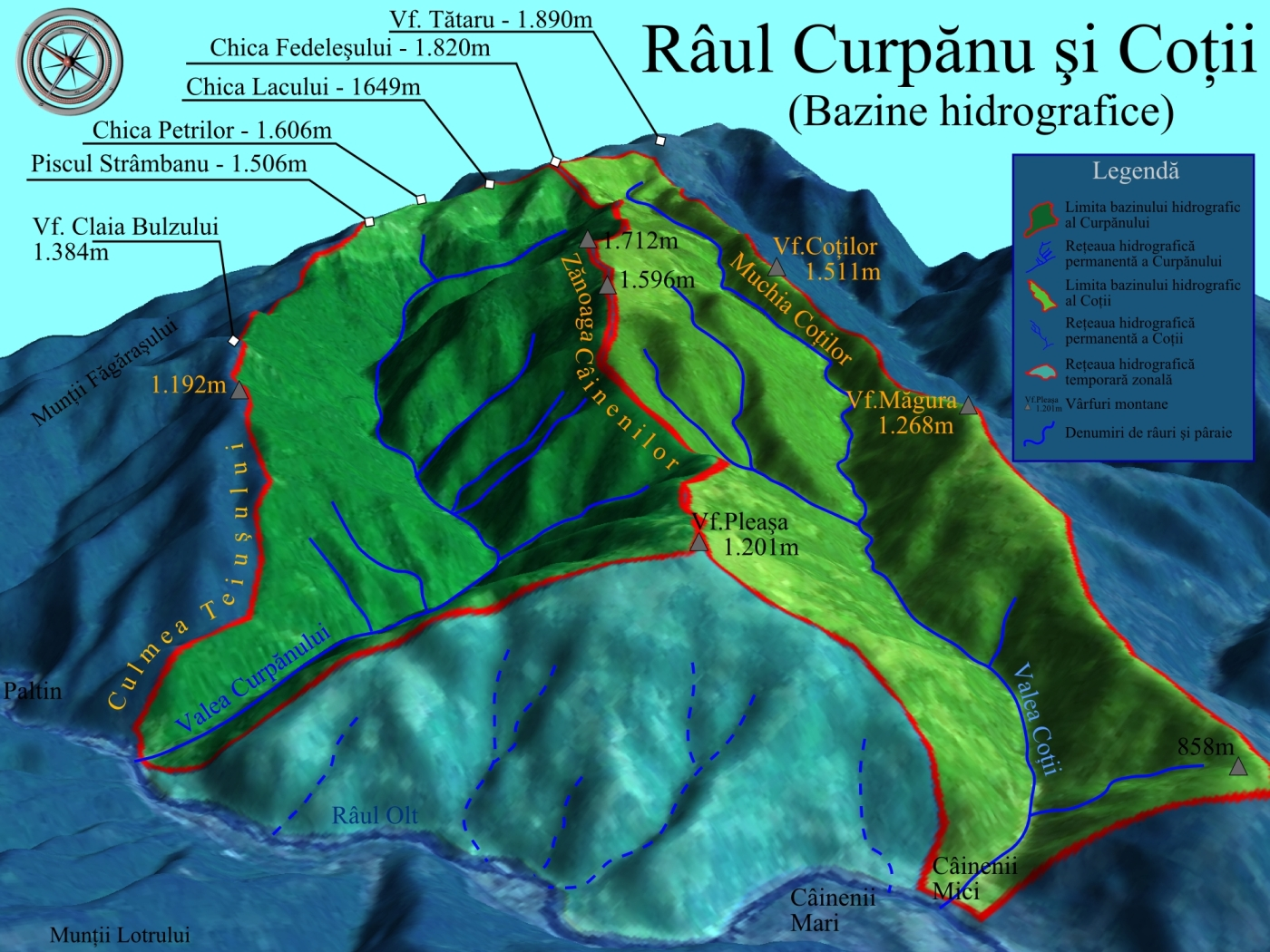
- The Curpăn river basin (dark green) and the Valea Satului (Coţii) river basin (light green)

- Location within Romania

Location
- Country: Romania
- Counties: Vâlcea County

Physical characteristics
- Mouth: Olt
  - location: Câinenii Mici
  - coordinates: 45.4948°N 24.3057°E
- Length: 12 km (7.5 mi)
- Basin size: 12 km^{2} (4.6 sq mi)

Basin features
- Progression: Olt→ Danube→ Black Sea

The Valea Satului or Valea Coții is a left tributary of the river Olt in Romania. It flows into the Olt in Câinenii Mici. Its length is 12 km (7.5 mi) and its basin size is 12 km^{2} (4.6 sq mi).
