= Căscioarele =

- Commune
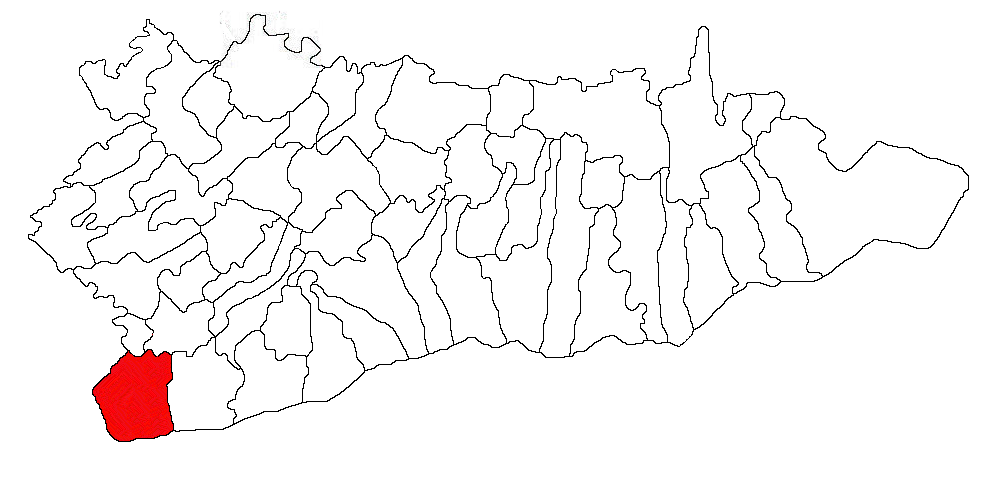
- Location in Călărași County

- Location in Romania
- Coordinates: 44.126°N 26.470°E
- Country: Romania
- County: Călărași

Government
  - Mayor (2024–2028): Florin Bordei (PSD)
- Area: 26.06 km^{2} (10.06 sq mi)
- Elevation: 47 m (154 ft)
- Population (2021-12-01): 1,546
  - Density: 59.32/km^{2} (153.7/sq mi)
- Time zone: UTC+02:00 (EET)
  - Summer (DST): UTC+03:00 (EEST)
- Postal code: 917020
- Area code: +(40) 242
- Vehicle reg.: CL
- Website: comunacascioarele.ro

Căscioarele is a commune in Călărași County, Muntenia, Romania. It is composed of a single village, Căscioarele.

The commune is situated in the south of the Wallachian Plain, at an altitude of 47 m (154 ft), on the left bank of the Danube, where the river Zboiul discharges into it. Căscioarele is located at the southwestern extremity of Călărași County, 18 km (11 mi) west of Oltenița, on the border with Giurgiu County. It is crossed by national road DN41, which connects Oltenița to Giurgiu.

Historical population
Year	Pop.	±%
2002	2,161	—
2011	1,912	−11.5%
2021	1,546	−19.1%
Source: Census data

As of the 2021 census, Căscioarele had a population of 1,546; of those, 90.23% were Romanians and 6.66% Roma.
