= Sâncraiu (disambiguation) =

Sâncraiu may refer to:

- Sâncraiu, a commune in Cluj County, Romania
- Sâncraiu de Mureș, a commune in Mureș County, Romania
- Sâncrăieni, a commune in Harghita County, Romania
- Sâncrai, a village attached to Aiud, Alba County, Romania
- Sâncraiu, a village in Ilieni Commune, Covasna County, Romania
- Sâncraiu Silvaniei, a village in Dobrin Commune, Sălaj County, Romania
- Eriu-Sâncrai, a village in Craidorolț Commune, Satu Mare County, Romania
