= Valea Roșie (Olt) =

- Location within Romania

Location
- Country: Romania
- Counties: Covasna County

Physical characteristics
- Mouth: Olt
  - location: Downstream of Bixad
  - coordinates: 46.0770°N 25.8369°E
- Length: 11 km (6.8 mi)
- Basin size: 33 km^{2} (13 sq mi)

Basin features
- Progression: Olt→ Danube→ Black Sea

The Valea Roșie is a left tributary of the river Olt in Romania. It merges into the Olt near Bixad. Its length is 11 km (6.8 mi) and its basin size 33 km^{2} (13 sq mi).
