= Var (Olt) =

- Location within Romania

Location
- Country: Romania
- Counties: Harghita County

Physical characteristics
- Mouth: Olt
  - location: Siculeni
  - coordinates: 46.4391°N 25.7536°E
- Length: 11 km (6.8 mi)
- Basin size: 19 km^{2} (7.3 sq mi)

Basin features
- Progression: Olt→ Danube→ Black Sea

The Var is a right tributary of the river Olt in Romania. It flows into the Olt in Siculeni, Harghita County. Its length is 11 km (6.8 mi) and its basin size is 19 km^{2} (7.3 sq mi).
