= Zebrac =

Zebrac Zebrák-patak
- Location within Romania

Location
- Country: Romania
- Counties: Mureș County

Physical characteristics
- Source: Călimani Mountains
- Mouth: Mureș
  - location: Stânceni
  - coordinates: 46.9596°N 25.2282°E
- Length: 11 km (6.8 mi)
- Basin size: 23 km^{2} (8.9 sq mi)

Basin features
- Progression: Mureș→ Tisza→ Danube→ Black Sea
- Tributaries
  - left: Buciu

The Zebrac (Hungarian: Zebrák, Zebrák-patak) is a right tributary of the river Mureș in Transylvania, Romania. It discharges into the Mureș in Stânceni. Its length is 11 km (6.8 mi) and its basin size is 23 km^{2} (8.9 sq mi).
