= Hăghig (river) =

Hăghig Pârâul Satului
- Location within Romania

Location
- Country: Romania
- Counties: Covasna County
- Villages: Hăghig

Physical characteristics
- Mouth: Olt
  - location: Hăghig
  - coordinates: 45.8300°N 25.5793°E
- Length: 11 km (6.8 mi)
- Basin size: 13 km^{2} (5.0 sq mi)

Basin features
- Progression: Olt→ Danube→ Black Sea

The Hăghig is a right tributary of the river Olt in Romania. It discharges into the Olt in the village Hăghig. Its length is 11 km (6.8 mi) and its basin size is 13 km^{2} (5.0 sq mi).
