= Vărmaga =

Vărmaga Vormágai-patak, Bán-patak
- Location within Romania

Location
- Country: Romania
- Counties: Hunedoara County
- Villages: Vărmaga, Banpotoc

Physical characteristics
- Mouth: Mureș
  - coordinates: 45.8810°N 22.9777°E
- Length: 14 km (8.7 mi)
- Basin size: 41 km^{2} (16 sq mi)

Basin features
- Progression: Mureș→ Tisza→ Danube→ Black Sea

The Vărmaga (Hungarian: Bán-patak or Vormágai-patak) is a right tributary of the river Mureș in Romania. It discharges into the Mureș near Chimindia. Its length is 14 km (8.7 mi) and its basin size is 41 km^{2} (16 sq mi).
