= Vinești =

Vinești Vám-patak
- Location within Romania

Location
- Country: Romania
- Counties: Arad County
- Villages: Săvârșin

Physical characteristics
- Mouth: Mureș
  - location: Săvârșin
  - coordinates: 46.0051°N 22.2182°E
- Length: 18 km (11 mi)
- Basin size: 46 km^{2} (18 sq mi)

Basin features
- Progression: Mureș→ Tisza→ Danube→ Black Sea

The Vinești (Hungarian: Vám, Vám-patak) is a right tributary of the river Mureș in Romania. It discharges into the Mureș in Săvârșin. Its length is 18 km (11 mi) and its basin size is 46 km^{2} (18 sq mi). Its Hungarian name means “Customs Creek”.
