= Muereasca =

- Commune
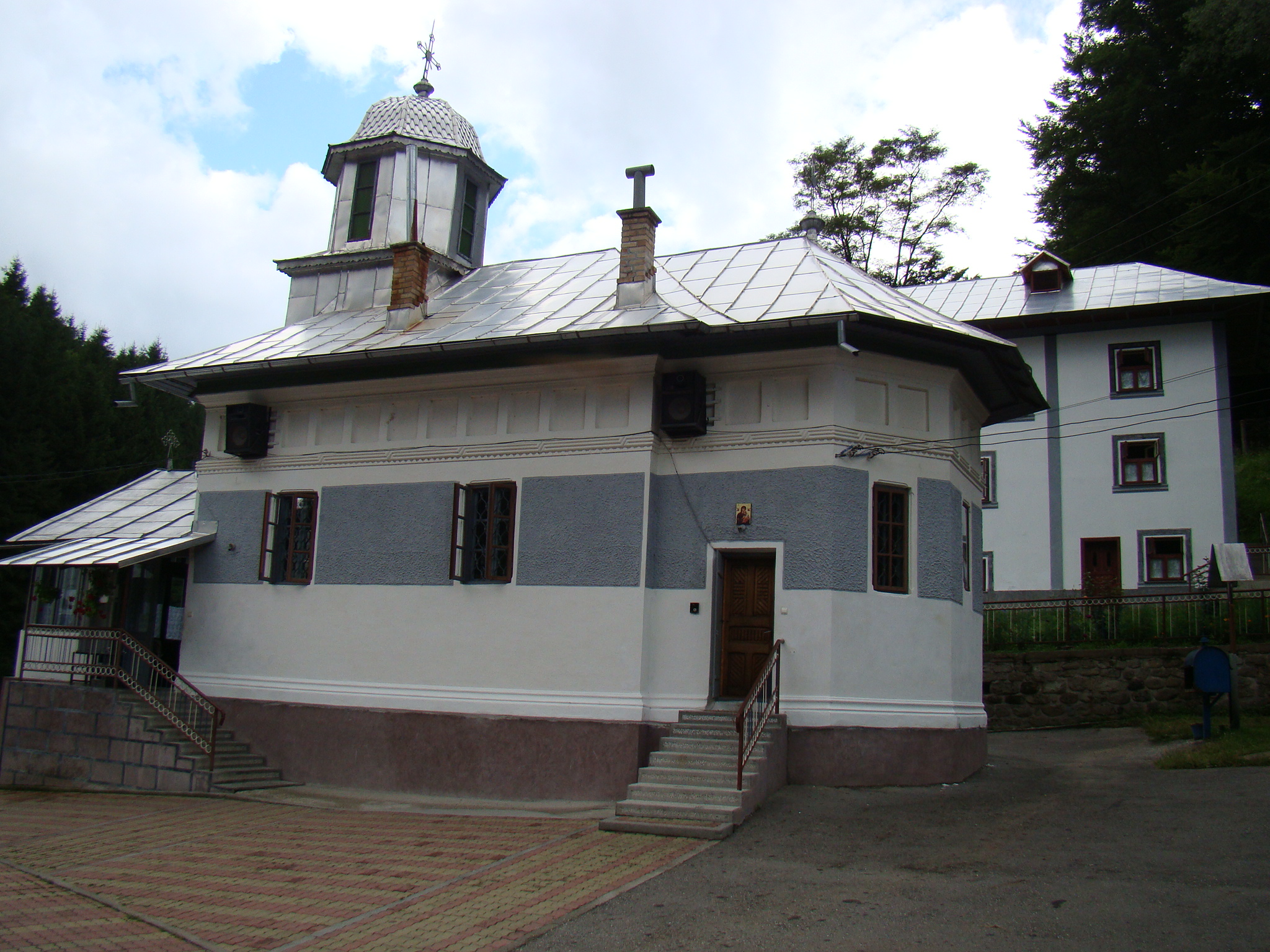
- Frăsinei Monastery in Andreiești

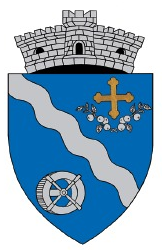
- Coat of arms

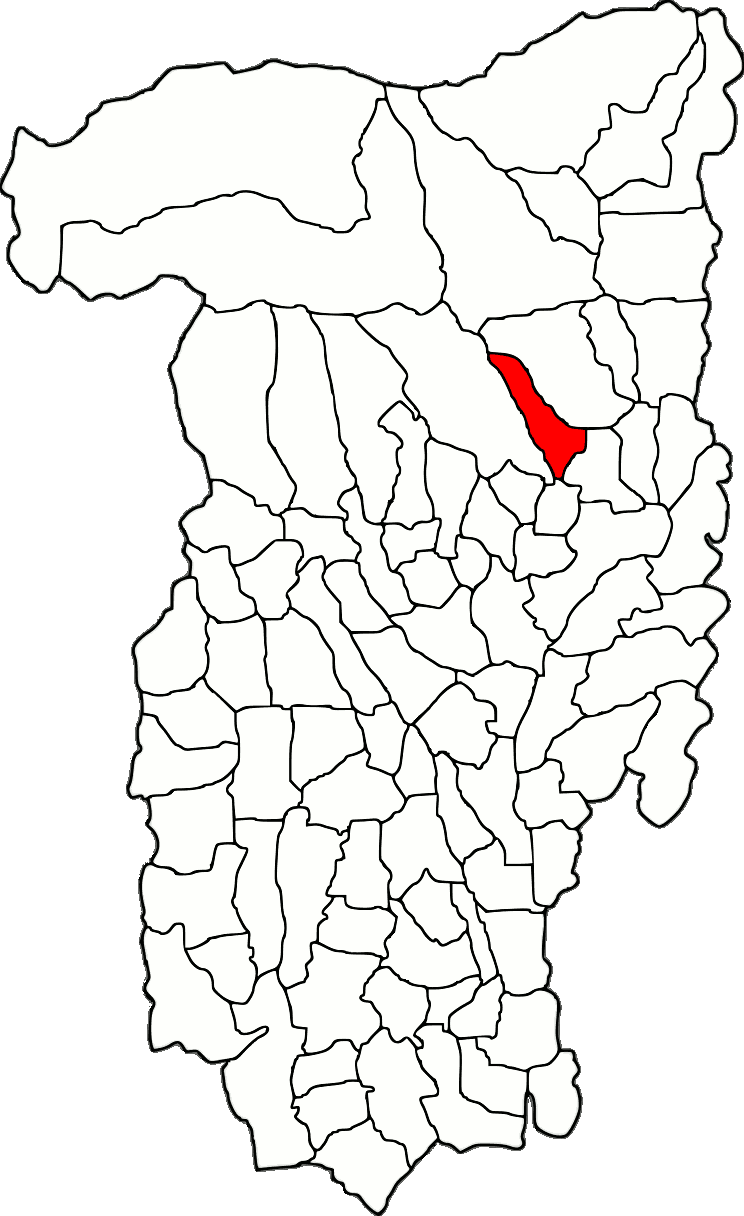
- Location in Vâlcea County

- Location in Romania
- Coordinates: 45°11′N 24°20′E
- Country: Romania
- County: Vâlcea

Government
  - Mayor (2024–2028): Ion Ungureanu (PNL)
- Area: 42.88 km^{2} (16.56 sq mi)
- Elevation: 336 m (1,102 ft)
- Population (2021-12-01): 2,063
  - Density: 48.11/km^{2} (124.6/sq mi)
- Time zone: UTC+02:00 (EET)
  - Summer (DST): UTC+03:00 (EEST)
- Postal code: 247405
- Area code: +(40) 250
- Vehicle reg.: VL
- Website: primaria-muereasca.ro

Muereasca is a commune located in Vâlcea County, Oltenia, Romania. It is composed of eight villages: Andreiești, Frâncești-Coasta, Găvănești, Hotarele, Muereasca, Muereasca de Sus, Pripoara, and Șuta.

Historical population
Year	Pop.	±%
2002	2,702	—
2011	2,467	−8.7%
2021	2,063	−16.4%
Source: Census data
