= Volovăț (Prut) =

- Location within Romania

Location
- Country: Romania
- Counties: Botoșani County
- Villages: Manoleasa

Physical characteristics
- Mouth: Prut
  - coordinates: 47°58′41″N 27°06′37″E
- Length: 43 km (27 mi)
- Basin size: 214 km^{2} (83 sq mi)
- Discharge
  - location: *
  - minimum: 0.001 m^{3}/s (0.035 cu ft/s)
  - maximum: 185 m^{3}/s (6,500 cu ft/s)

Basin features
- Progression: Prut→ Danube→ Black Sea
- Tributaries
  - left: Păstoaia, Adășeni, Răchita

The Volovăț is a right tributary of the river Prut in Romania. It discharges into the Stânca-Costești Reservoir, which is drained by the Prut, near Ripiceni. Its length is 43 km (27 mi) and its basin size is 214 km^{2} (83 sq mi).
