= Valea Crișului (river) =

- Location within Romania

Location
- Country: Romania
- Counties: Covasna County
- Villages: Valea Crișului

Physical characteristics
- Mouth: Olt
  - location: Ghidfalău
  - coordinates: 45.9027°N 25.8355°E
- Length: 16 km (9.9 mi)
- Basin size: 33 km^{2} (13 sq mi)

Basin features
- Progression: Olt→ Danube→ Black Sea
- Tributaries
  - right: Vadăș

The Valea Crișului is a right tributary of the river Olt in Romania. It flows into the Olt in Ghidfalău. Its length is 16 km (9.9 mi) and its basin size is 33 km^{2} (13 sq mi).
