= Vâlcele (Olt) =

- Location within Romania

Location
- Country: Romania
- Counties: Covasna County
- Villages: Vâlcele, Araci

Physical characteristics
- Mouth: Olt
  - location: Vâlcele
  - coordinates: 45.8076°N 25.6453°E
- Length: 11 km (6.8 mi)
- Basin size: 32 km^{2} (12 sq mi)

Basin features
- Progression: Olt→ Danube→ Black Sea
- Tributaries
  - left: Sipoș, Pârâul Pietros
  - right: Araci

The Vâlcele is a right tributary of the river Olt in Romania. It discharges into the Olt in Araci. Its length is 11 km (6.8 mi) and its basin size is 32 km^{2} (12 sq mi).
