= Zboiul =

- Location within Romania

Location
- Country: Romania
- Counties: Giurgiu, Călărași
- Villages: Zboiu, Căscioarele

Physical characteristics
- Mouth: Danube
  - coordinates: 44.0581°N 26.6085°E
- Length: 28 km (17 mi)
- Basin size: 86 km^{2} (33 sq mi)

Basin features
- Progression: Danube→ Black Sea

The Zboiul is a small left tributary of the river Danube in Romania. It discharges into the Danube just upstream of the confluence of the Danube and Argeș, west of Oltenița. Its length is 28 km (17 mi) and its basin size is 86 km^{2} (33 sq mi).
