= Vulturești, Olt =

Vulturești
- Commune
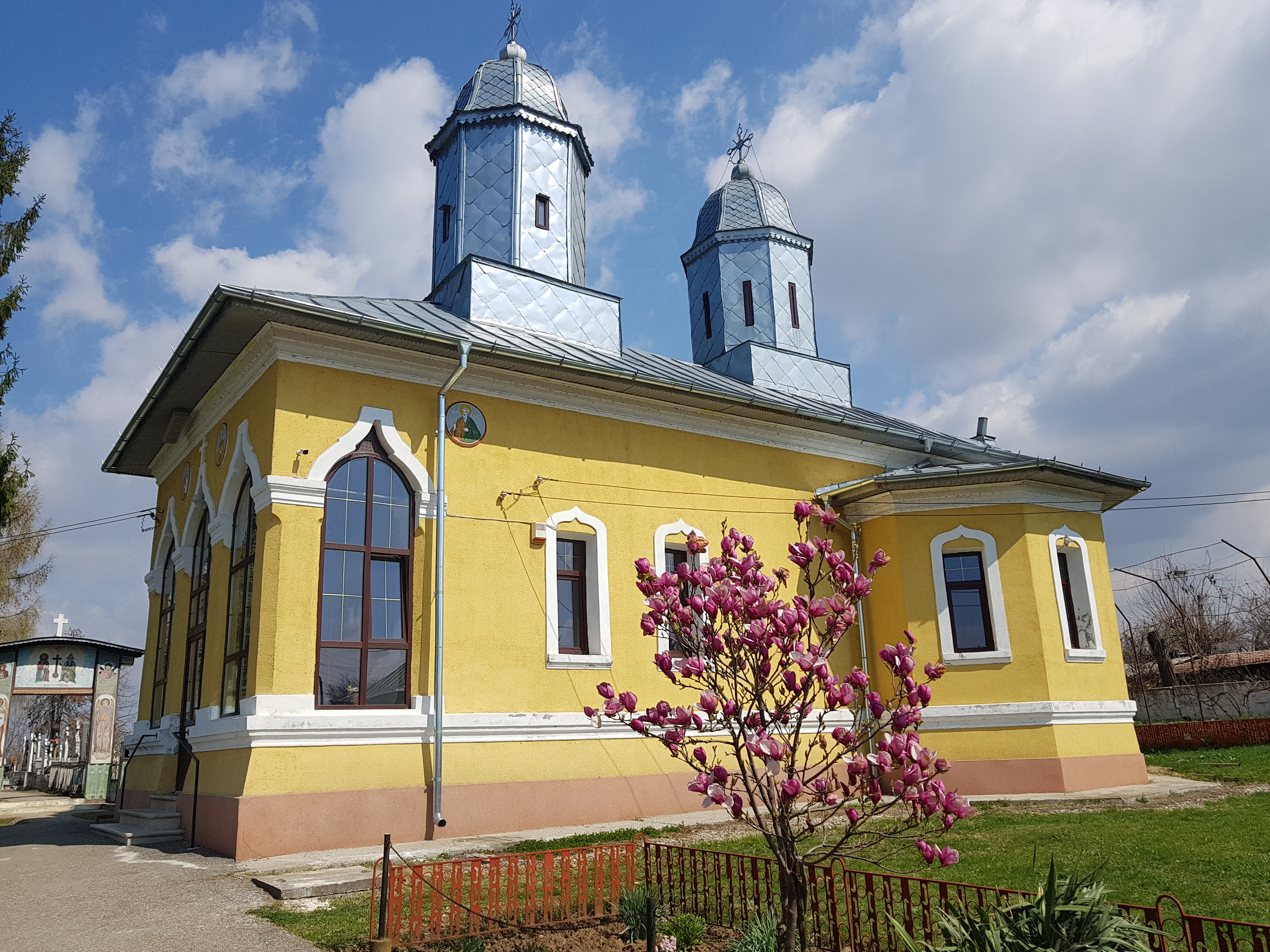
- Saint Voivodes Church in Vulturești

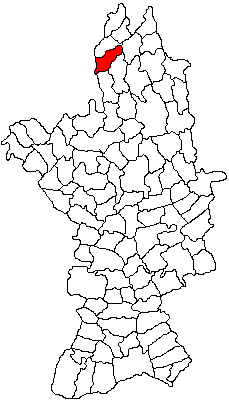
- Location in Olt County

- Location in Romania
- Coordinates: 44°44′N 24°19′E
- Country: Romania
- County: Olt

Government
  - Mayor (2024–2028): Marius-Florian Treanță (PSD)
- Area: 45.11 km^{2} (17.42 sq mi)
- Elevation: 177 m (581 ft)
- Population (2021-12-01): 2,123
  - Density: 47.06/km^{2} (121.9/sq mi)
- Time zone: UTC+02:00 (EET)
  - Summer (DST): UTC+03:00 (EEST)
- Postal code: 237580
- Vehicle reg.: OT
- Website: primariavulturesti.ro

Vulturești is a commune in Olt County, Muntenia, Romania. It is composed of four villages: Dienci, Valea lui Alb, Vlăngărești, and Vulturești.

The commune is situated on the Wallachian Plain, on the left bank of the Olt River. It is located in the northern part of Olt County, on the border with Vâlcea County, 42 km (26 mi) from the county seat, Slatina.

The six-term mayor of the commune, Gheorghe Treanță, died in August 2021 in a hospital in Bucharest, of stomach cancer.
