= Bujoreni, Vâlcea =

Bujoreni
- Commune
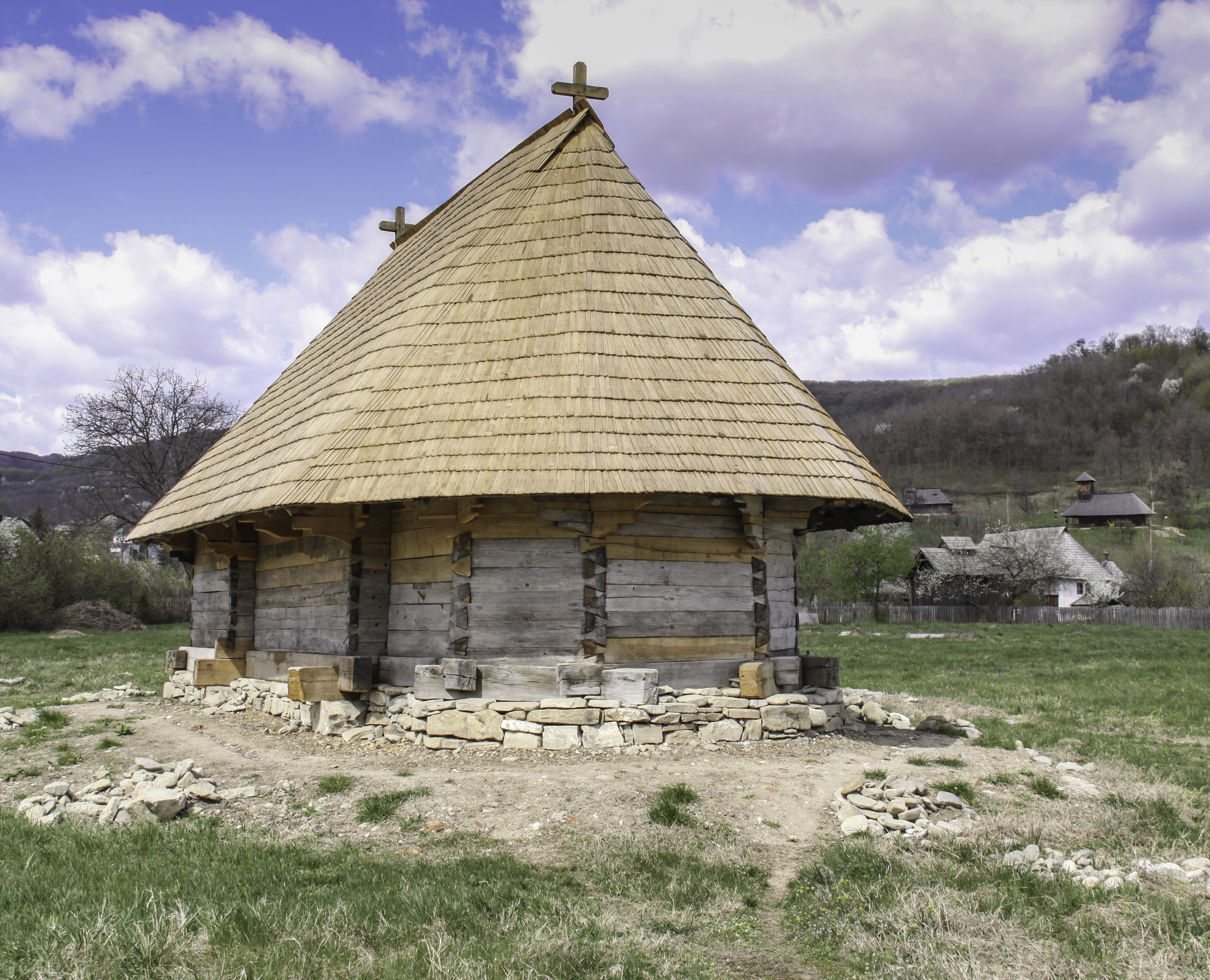
- Wooden church in Anghelești

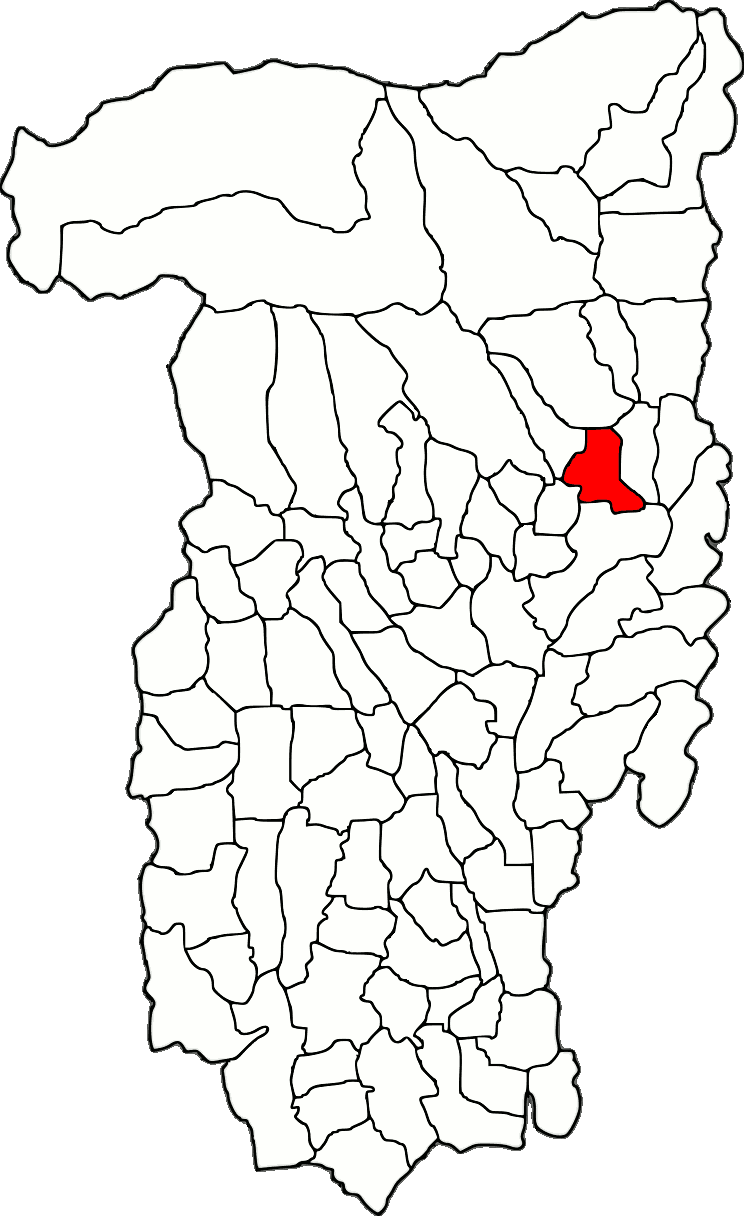
- Location in Vâlcea County

- Location in Romania
- Coordinates: 45°10′18.9818″N 24°20′5.5568″E
- Country: Romania
- County: Vâlcea
- Subdivisions: Bogdănești, Gura Văii, Lunca, Malu Alb, Malu Vârtop, Olteni

Government
  - Mayor (2020–2024): Gheorghe Gîngu (PNL)
- Area: 33.78 km^{2} (13.04 sq mi)
- Elevation: 295 m (968 ft)
- Population (2021-12-01): 5,305
  - Density: 157.0/km^{2} (406.7/sq mi)
- Time zone: UTC+02:00 (EET)
  - Summer (DST): UTC+03:00 (EEST)
- Postal code: 247065
- Area code: +(40) 250
- Vehicle reg.: VL
- Website: primariabujoreni.ro

Bujoreni is a commune located in Vâlcea County, Oltenia, Romania, just to the north of Râmnicu Vâlcea, the seat of Vâlcea County. It is composed of seven villages: Bogdănești, Bujoreni, Gura Văii, Lunca, Malu Alb, Malu Vârtop, and Olteni (the commune centre).

Agriculture is the main income source. There are special traditions which have been well preserved.

== Geography ==
Bujoreni stretches along the European Route E81 (DN7) (Bucharest–Râmnicu Vâlcea–Sibiu), on the right bank of the River Olt.

Historical population
| Year | Pop. | ±% |
|---|---|---|
| 2002 | 3,894 | — |
| 2011 | 4,410 | +13.3% |
| 2021 | 5,305 | +20.3% |
Source: Census data

== Natives ==
- Valeriu Sârbu (1931–2009), poet, playwright
