= Valea Roștilor =

- Location within Romania

Location
- Country: Romania
- Counties: Tulcea County
- Villages: Luminița, Făgărașu Nou, Măgurele

Physical characteristics
- Mouth: Danube
  - location: Ostrov
  - coordinates: 44.9002°N 28.1310°E
- Length: 28 km (17 mi)
- Basin size: 114 km^{2} (44 sq mi)

Basin features
- Progression: Danube→ Black Sea

The Valea Roștilor is a right tributary of the river Danube in Romania. It discharges into the Danube near Ostrov. Its length is 28 km (17 mi) and its basin size is 114 km^{2} (44 sq mi).
