= Valea Mare (Olt) =

- Location within Romania

Location
- Country: Romania
- Counties: Brașov County
- Villages: Dopca

Physical characteristics
- Mouth: Olt
  - location: Dopca
  - coordinates: 45.9842°N 25.3792°E
- Length: 13 km (8.1 mi)
- Basin size: 30 km^{2} (12 sq mi)

Basin features
- Progression: Olt→ Danube→ Black Sea

The Valea Mare is a left tributary of the river Olt in Romania. It flows into the Olt in Dopca. Its length is 13 km (8.1 mi) and its basin size is 30 km^{2} (12 sq mi). The Dopca Dam is located on this river.
