= Robești (river) =

- Location within Romania

Location
- Country: Romania
- Counties: Vâlcea County
- Villages: Robești

Physical characteristics
- Mouth: Olt
  - location: Robești
  - coordinates: 45.4529°N 24.2964°E
- Length: 8 km (5.0 mi)
- Basin size: 20 km^{2} (7.7 sq mi)

Basin features
- Progression: Olt→ Danube→ Black Sea
- Tributaries
  - left: Cocinilor
  - right: Padinile, Bârlogu, Jangu

The Robești is a right tributary of the river Olt in Romania. It flows into the Olt in the village Robești. Its length is 8 km (5.0 mi) and its basin size is 20 km^{2} (7.7 sq mi).
