= Bixad, Covasna =

Bixad Sepsibükszád
- Commune
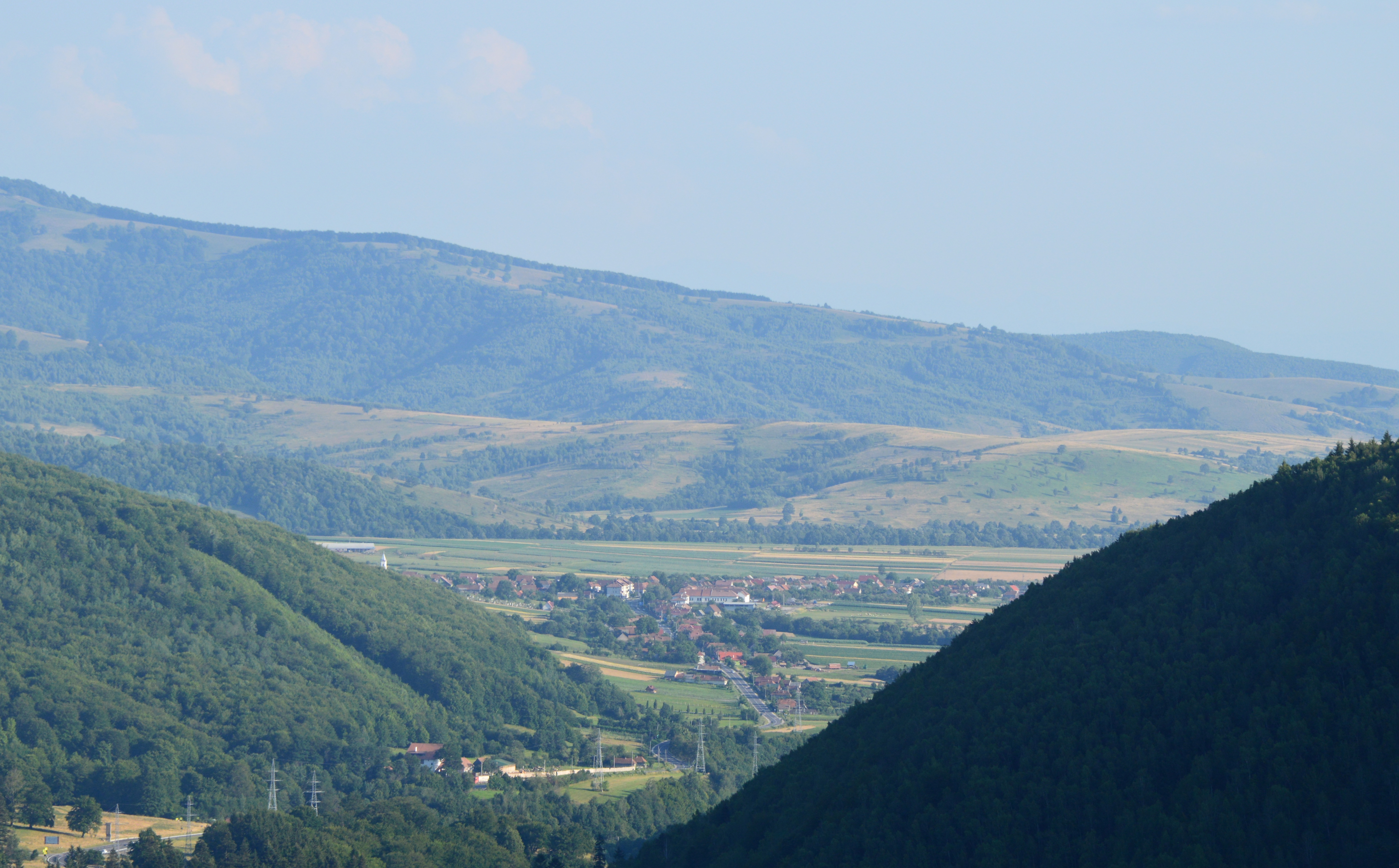

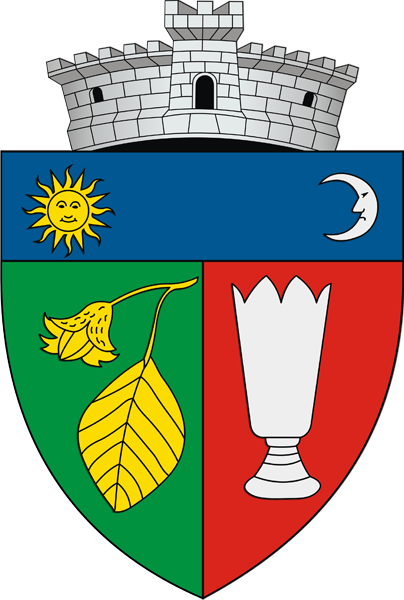
- Coat of arms

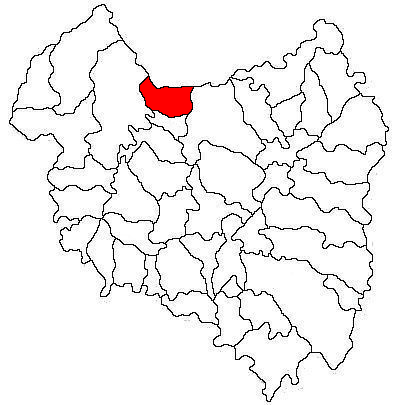
- Location in Covasna County

- Location in Romania
- Coordinates: 46°1′0″N 25°50′50″E
- Country: Romania
- County: Covasna

Government
  - Mayor (2020–2024): Márton-Csaba Bács (UDMR)
- Area: 60.59 km^{2} (23.39 sq mi)
- Elevation: 663 m (2,175 ft)
- Population (2021-12-01): 1,585
  - Density: 26.16/km^{2} (67.75/sq mi)
- Time zone: UTC+02:00 (EET)
  - Summer (DST): UTC+03:00 (EEST)
- Postal code: 527116
- Area code: (+40) 02 67
- Vehicle reg.: CV
- Website: bukszad.ro

Bixad (Hungarian: Sepsibükszád, Hungarian pronunciation: [ʃɛpʃibyksaːd]) is a commune in Covasna County, Transylvania, Romania. Composed of a single village, Bixad, it was joined to Malnaș in 1968. It once again became an independent commune when it split off in 2004. It lies in the Székely Land, an ethno-cultural region in eastern Transylvania.

== Geography ==
The commune is located in the northern part of Covasna County, 30 km (19 mi) from the county seat, Sfântu Gheorghe, on the border with Harghita County. It lies in a valley on the upper reaches of the Olt River, at an altitude of 663 m (2,175 ft), on the northern side of the Baraolt Mountains. The river Valea Roșie merges into the Olt downstream of Bixad.

The commune is crossed by the national road DN12 (part of European route E78), which starts in Chichiș and goes north to Toplița. Route DN11C branches off in Bixad, going southeast towards Târgu Secuiesc. Two train stations (Cariera Bixad and Bicsadu Oltului) serve the CFR Main Line 400, which connects Brașov with the northwestern city of Satu Mare.

== Demographics ==
Historical population
Year	Pop.	±%
1850	813	—
1930	2,109	+159.4%
1966	2,617	+24.1%
2002	1,811	−30.8%
2011	1,799	−0.7%
2021	1,585	−11.9%
Source: Census data

The commune has an absolute Székely Hungarian majority. At the 2011 Census, it had a population of 1,799, of which 94.94% were Hungarians and 1.89% Roma. At the 2021 Census, Bixad had 1,585 inhabitants; of those, 90,73% were Hungarians, 3.41% Roma, and 2.84% Romanians.

== Tourist attractions ==
- The Mikes Armin School, which was the hunting lodge of the Mikes family and built by Count Ármin Mikes around 1900. Apart from the school, the building hosts a little museum displaying glass from the factory which was operated by the Mikó and later the Mikes family in the village until 1918.
- The so-called Mikes Spas: the Vallato, the Hammas, and the Bükki Spa.
