= Stoilești =

- Commune
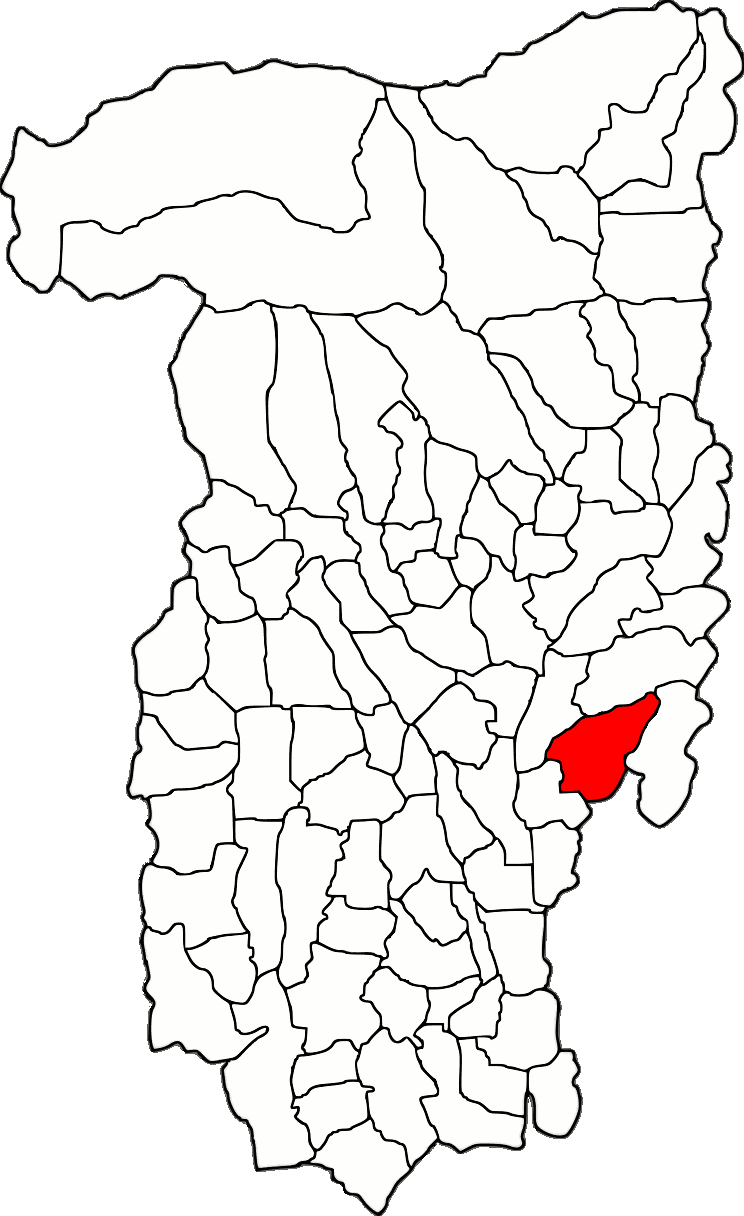
- Location in Vâlcea County

- Location in Romania
- Coordinates: 44°54′N 24°23′E
- Country: Romania
- County: Vâlcea
- Area: 63.71 km^{2} (24.60 sq mi)
- Population (2021-12-01): 3,341
  - Density: 52.44/km^{2} (135.8/sq mi)
- Time zone: UTC+02:00 (EET)
  - Summer (DST): UTC+03:00 (EEST)
- Vehicle reg.: VL

Stoilești is a commune located in Vâlcea County, Muntenia, Romania. It is composed of fifteen villages: Balomireasa, Bârsoiu, Bulagei, Delureni, Geamăna, Ghiobești, Giuroiu, Izvoru Rece, Malu, Nețești, Obogeni, Stănești, Stoilești, Urși and Vlădulești.
