= Vad (Olt) =

Vad Râul Vadului, Paltin, Căprărețu
- Vad drainage basin

- Location within Romania

Location
- Country: Romania
- Counties: Sibiu, Vâlcea

Physical characteristics
- Mouth: Olt
  - coordinates: 45.5500°N 24.2668°E
- Length: 12 km (7.5 mi)
- Basin size: 46 km^{2} (18 sq mi)

Basin features
- Progression: Olt→ Danube→ Black Sea
- Tributaries
  - right: Floarea Mică, Iacob

The Vad (in its upper course also: Căprărețu) is a right tributary of the river Olt in Romania. It discharges into the Olt in Lazaret. Its length is 12 km (7.5 mi) and its basin size is 46 km^{2} (18 sq mi).
