= Scărișoara, Olt =

Scărișoara
- Commune
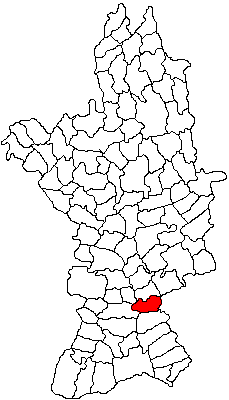
- Location in Olt County

- Location in Romania
- Coordinates: 43.9841°N 24.5596°E
- Country: Romania
- County: Olt
- Population (2021-12-01): 2,901
- Time zone: UTC+02:00 (EET)
  - Summer (DST): UTC+03:00 (EEST)
- Vehicle reg.: OT

Scărișoara is a commune in Olt County, Oltenia, Romania. It is composed of three villages: Plăviceni, Rudari and Scărișoara.
