= Orlești =

- Commune
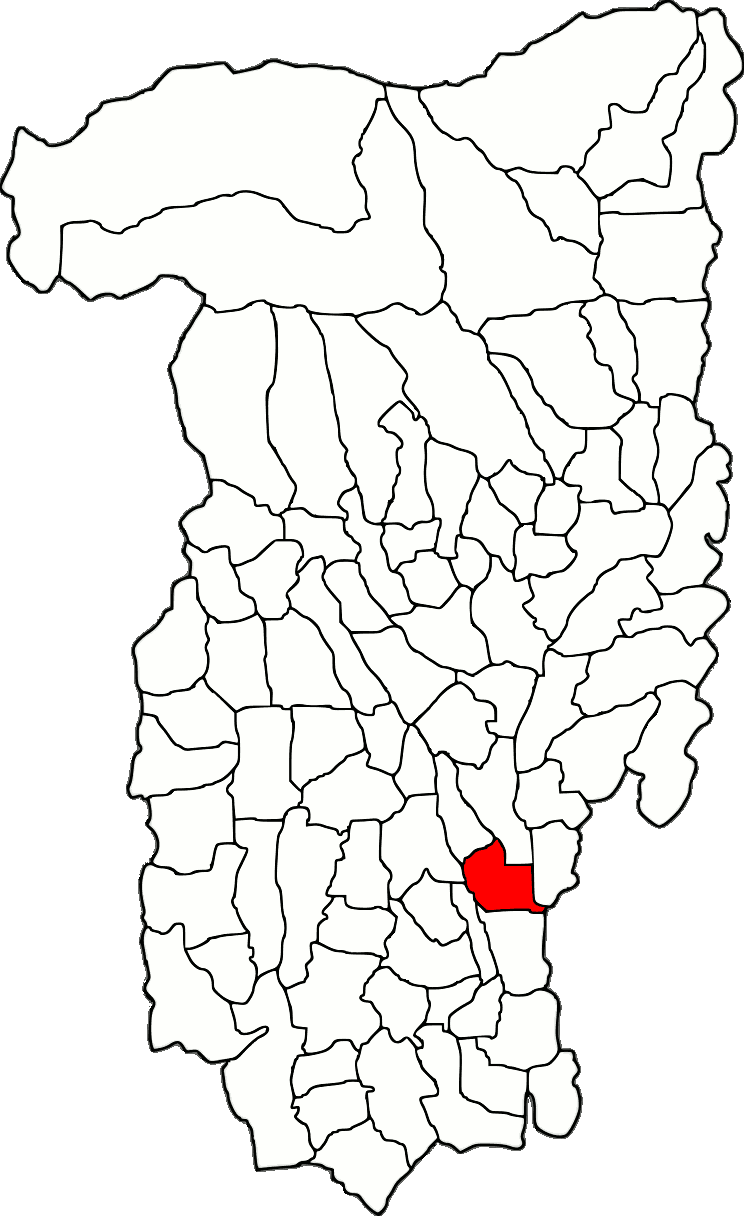
- Location in Vâlcea County

- Location in Romania
- Coordinates: 44°48′N 24°13′E
- Country: Romania
- County: Vâlcea

Government
  - Mayor (2024–2028): Constantin Cârstina (PNL)
- Area: 37.48 km^{2} (14.47 sq mi)
- Elevation: 193 m (633 ft)
- Population (2021-12-01): 2,562
  - Density: 68.36/km^{2} (177.0/sq mi)
- Time zone: UTC+02:00 (EET)
  - Summer (DST): UTC+03:00 (EEST)
- Postal code: 247450
- Area code: +(40) 250
- Vehicle reg.: VL
- Website: www.primariaorlesti.ro

Orlești is a commune located in Vâlcea County, Oltenia, Romania. It is composed of five villages: Aurești, Orlești, Procopoaia, Scaioși, and Silea.
