= Olanu =

- Commune
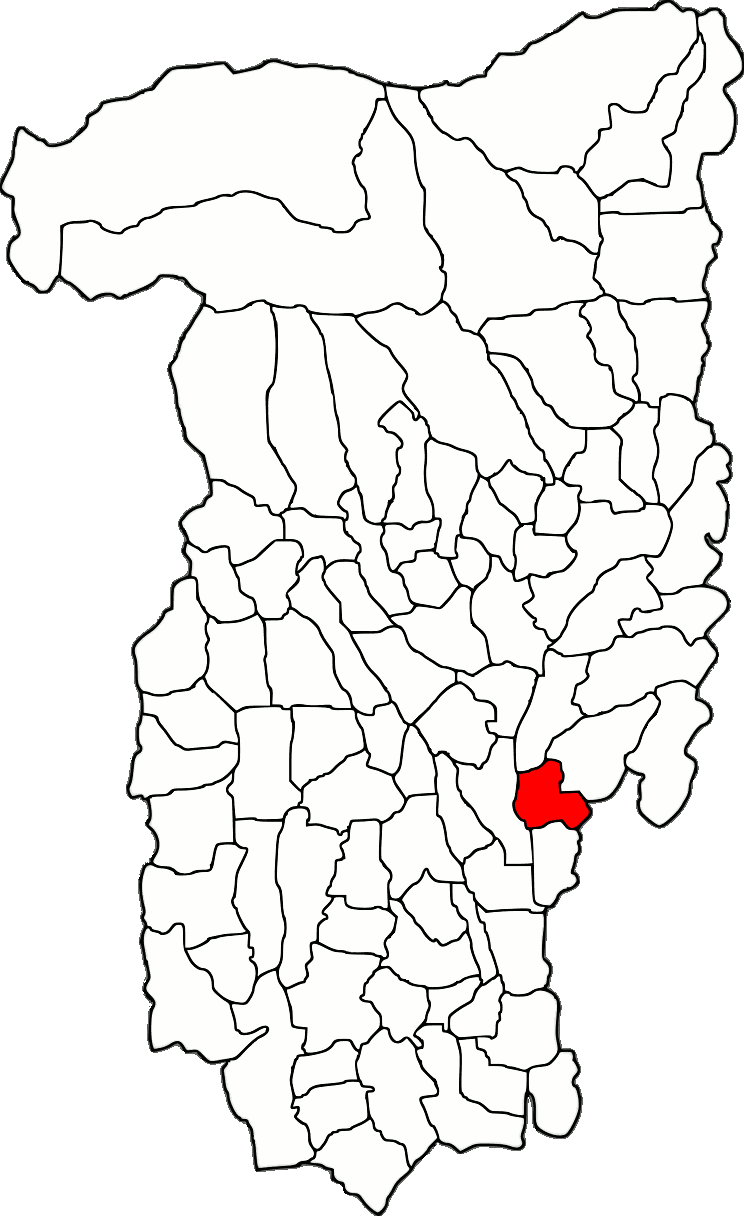
- Location in Vâlcea County

- Location in Romania
- Coordinates: 44°52′N 24°19′E
- Country: Romania
- County: Vâlcea

Government
  - Mayor (2024–2028): Răzvan Florentin Popa (PSD)
- Area: 33.79 km^{2} (13.05 sq mi)
- Elevation: 193 m (633 ft)
- Population (2021-12-01): 2,501
  - Density: 74.02/km^{2} (191.7/sq mi)
- Time zone: UTC+02:00 (EET)
  - Summer (DST): UTC+03:00 (EEST)
- Postal code: 247440
- Area code: +(40) 250
- Vehicle reg.: VL
- Website: www.primariaolanuvl.ro

Olanu is a commune located in Vâlcea County, Muntenia, Romania. It is composed of six villages: Olanu, Casa Veche, Cioboți, Drăgioiu, Nicolești, and Stoicănești.
