= Porumbacu de Jos =

- Commune
- St. Nicholas Church in Porumbacu de Jos

- Coat of arms

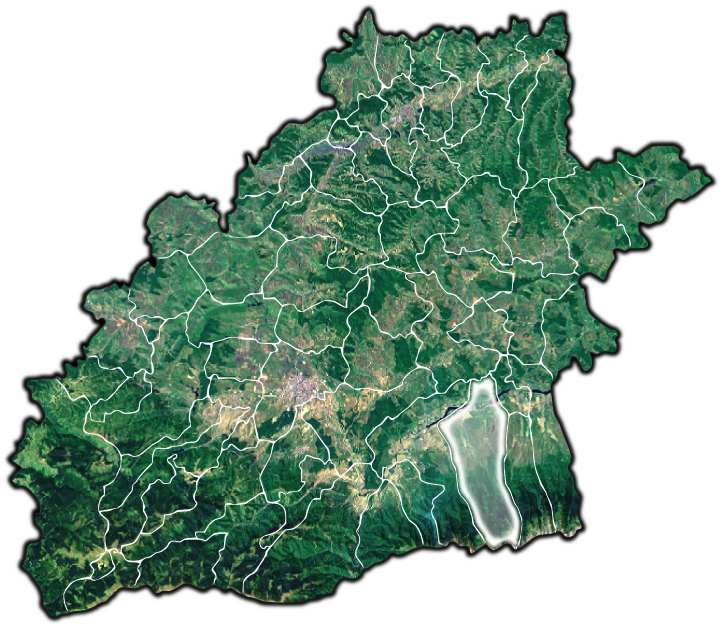
- Location in Sibiu County

- Location in Romania
- Coordinates: 45°45′29″N 24°27′25″E
- Country: Romania
- County: Sibiu

Government
  - Mayor (2024–2028): Dorel Ioan Martincu (PSD)
- Area: 184.87 km^{2} (71.38 sq mi)
- Elevation: 397 m (1,302 ft)
- Population (2021-12-01): 2,876
  - Density: 15.56/km^{2} (40.29/sq mi)
- Time zone: UTC+02:00 (EET)
  - Summer (DST): UTC+03:00 (EEST)
- Postal code: 557190
- Area code: +(40) 0269
- Vehicle reg.: SB
- Website: www.porumbacudejos.ro

Porumbacu de Jos (German: Unter-Bornbach; Hungarian: Alsóporumbák) is a commune in Sibiu County, Transylvania, central Romania, first documented in 1473. It is composed of five villages: Colun (Kellen, Kolun), Porumbacu de Jos, Porumbacu de Sus (Felsőporumbák), Sărata (Salz, Szarata), and Scoreiu (Skorei).

The commune is located in the southeastern part of the country, at the extreme west of the historical region of Țara Făgărașului. It is crossed by the DN1 road, and lies at a distance of 34 km (21 mi) from the county seat, Sibiu, 42 km (26 mi) from Făgăraș, 108 km (67 mi) from Brașov, and 281 km (175 mi) from Bucharest.

At the 2011 census, Porumbacu de Jos had a population of 3,061; of those, 86.28% were Romanians and 8.3% Roma. At the 2021 census, the commune had a population of 2,876; of those, 75.87% were Romanians and 12.07% Roma.

Porumbacu de Jos is a base for hiking and climbing tours to the Southern Carpathians, notably the Negoiu chalet at 1,546 m (5,072 ft) altitude, which lies at the foot of Negoiu Peak (2,535 m (8,317 ft)).

== Natives ==
- Aurel Bărglăzan (1905 – 1960) engineer, academic, and corresponding member of the Romanian Academy
- Ioan Alexandru Lapedatu (1844 – 1878) poet, prose writer, and newspaper contributor
