= Ilieni =

Ilieni Illyefalva
- Commune
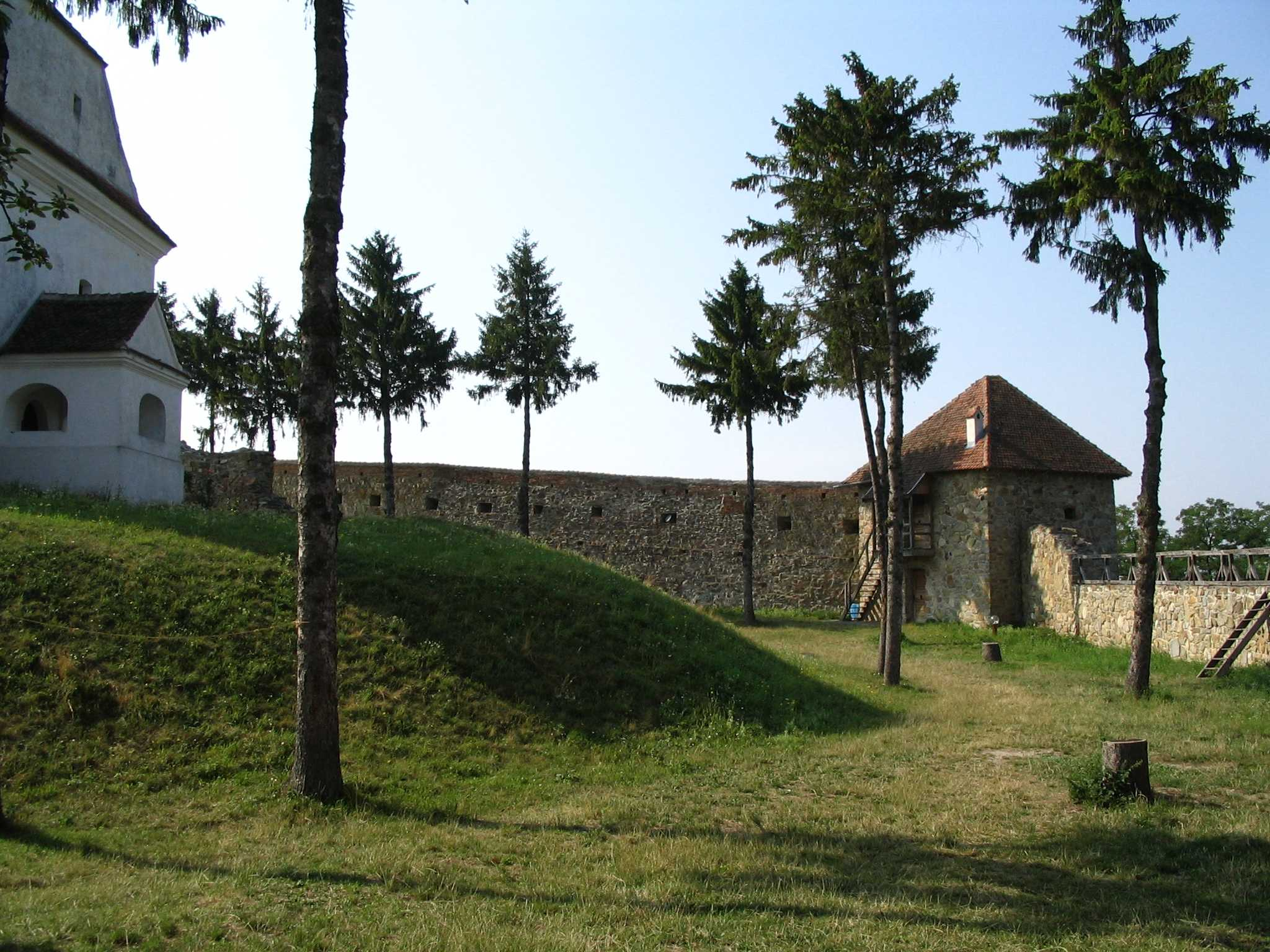
- Walls of the fortified church

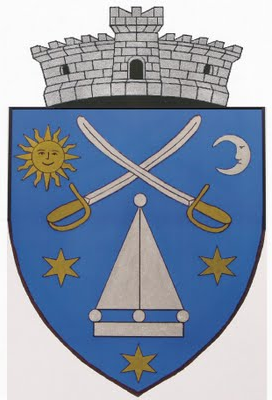
- Coat of arms

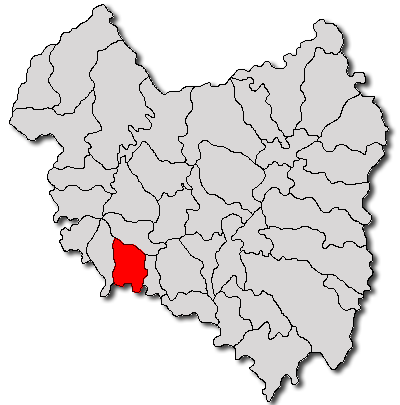
- Location in Covasna County

- Location in Romania
- Coordinates: 45°47′32″N 25°46′16″E
- Country: Romania
- County: Covasna

Government
  - Mayor (2020–2024): Imre Fodor (UDMR)
- Area: 60 km^{2} (23 sq mi)
- Elevation: 534 m (1,752 ft)
- Population (2021-12-01): 2,181
  - Density: 36/km^{2} (94/sq mi)
- Time zone: UTC+02:00 (EET)
  - Summer (DST): UTC+03:00 (EEST)
- Postal code: 527105
- Area code: (+40) 02 67
- Vehicle reg.: CV
- Website: ilieni.ro

Ilieni (Hungarian: Illyefalva [ˈijjɛfɒlvɒ]; German: Ilgendorf) is a commune located in Covasna County, south-eastern Transylvania, Romania, 7 km (4.3 mi) south of the county seat. Sfântu Gheorghe. The commune is composed of three villages: Dobolii de Jos (Aldoboly), Ilieni, and Sâncraiu (Sepsiszentkirály).

== Demographics ==
Historical population
Year	Pop.	±%
1850	2,854	—
1920	3,332	+16.7%
1966	2,571	−22.8%
2002	1,853	−27.9%
2011	2,036	+9.9%
2021	2,181	+7.1%
Source: Census data

The commune has an absolute Székely Hungarian majority. According to the 2011 census, it had a population of 2,036, of which 85.09% were Hungarians and 14.21% Romanians. At the 2021 census, Ilieni had a population of 2,181; of those, 79.32% were Hungarians, 14.21% Romanians, and 1.6% Roma.

== History ==
There is archaeological evidence of the area having been populated since the Bronze Age. The place was first time mentioned in a church tax inventory as "Villa Helye" in 1332. In the Middle Ages, having the rights of a market town, the settlement was more important than today. The abundance of arable lands in the area (within the historical Háromszék region), and trade relations with nearby Saxon settlements, including Brașov, contributed to the sound economic basis of the community.

Also resulting from its geographical location, the Székely settlement, during its history, was often subject to foreign military campaigns. The most tragical of these attacks was in 1658, when the fortified church of the village was successfully conquered by allied Turkish and Moldavian forces, who killed all the defending fighters and threw their bodies into the well of the stronghold. Surviving villagers were taken to custody.

Since the fall of communism in 1989, the local community has been successful in developing viable economic activities, mostly based on agriculture and food industry, but a conference centre, a youth hostel and guest houses in the area also contribute to the revival of the settlement.

== Fortified church ==
The time when the church was built is not recorded. It was rebuilt in the 15th century in Gothic style, later Renaissance and Baroque renovations were made. Following a series of Tatar, Saxon and Turkish attacks the church was gradually fortified during the 15th-17th centuries. Smaller-scale earthquakes in the region also made regular renovations necessary. One of the strongest quakes recorded in 1802 seriously damaged the building and its painted wooden ceiling. The church building was renovated in the 1990s.
