= Câineni =

- Commune
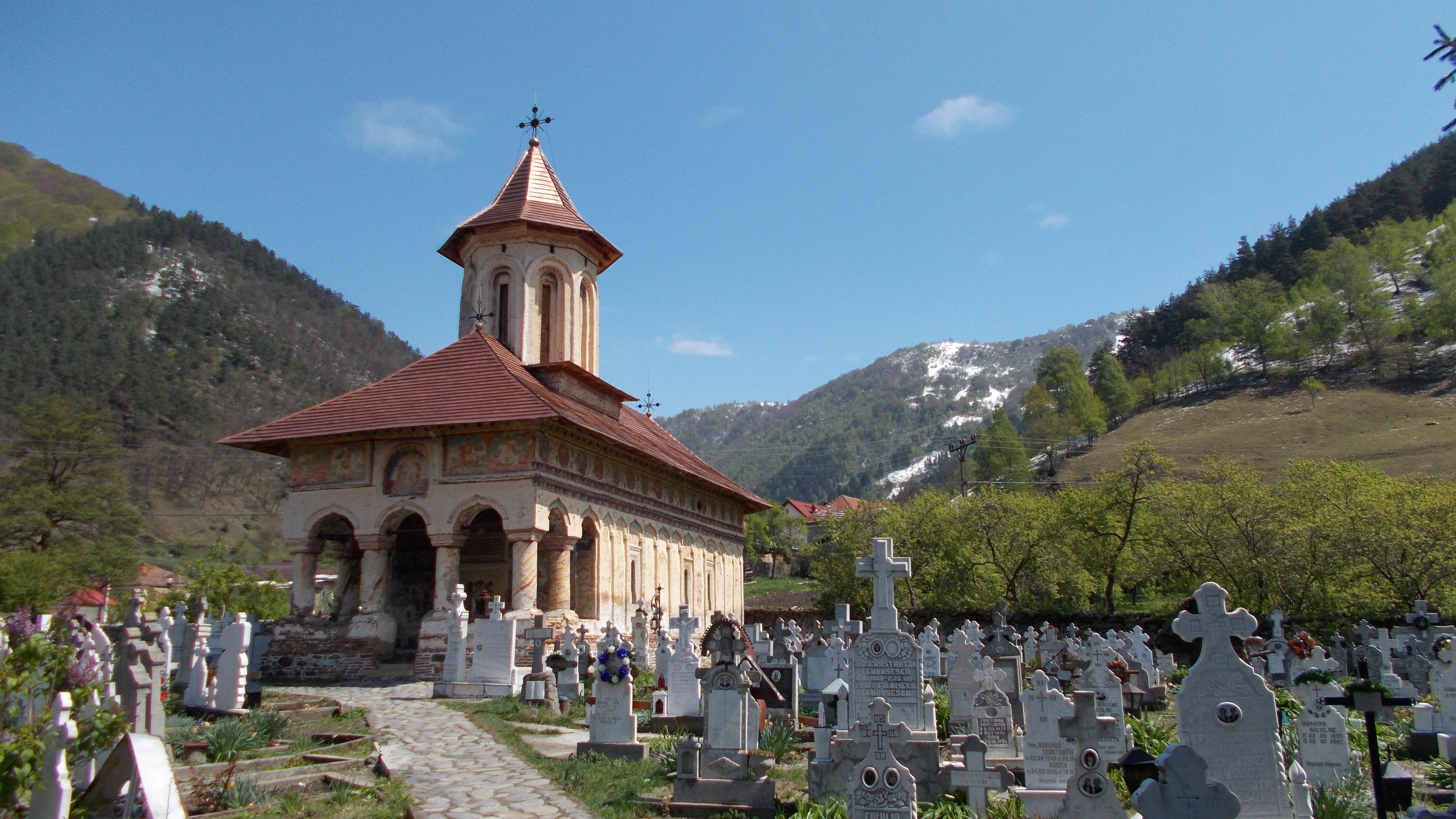
- Saint Nicholas Church in Câinenii Mici

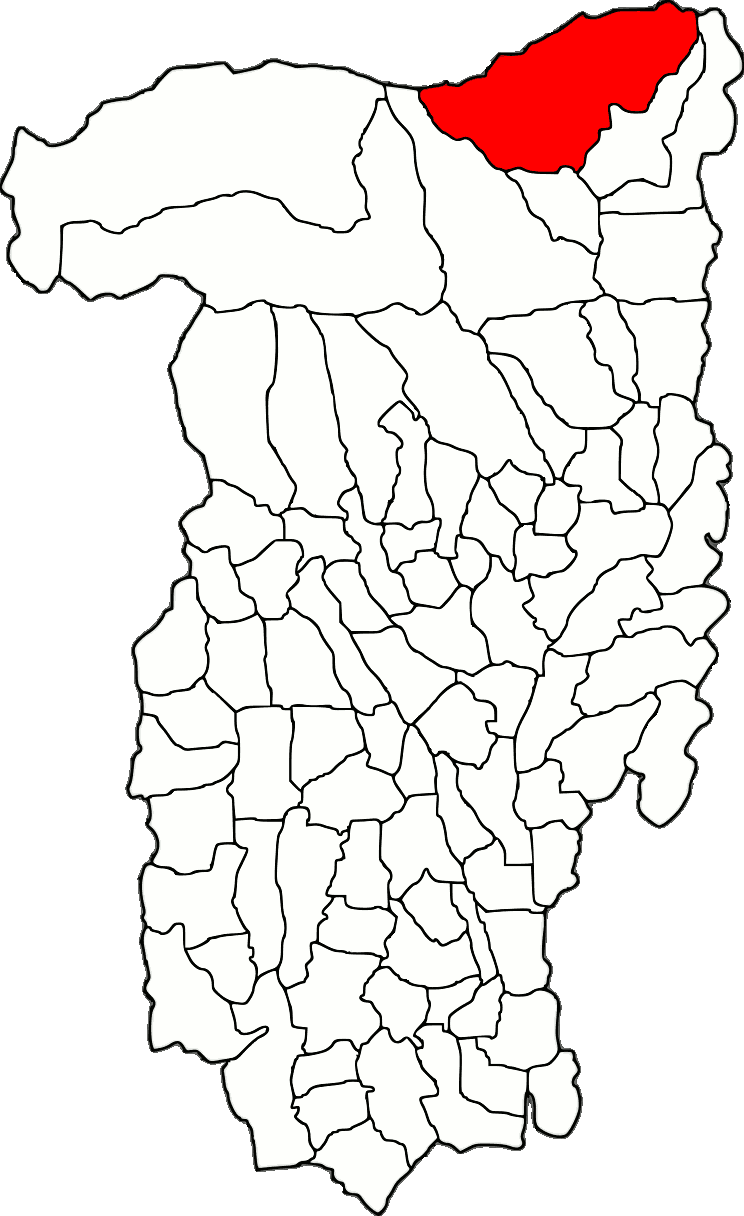
- Location in Vâlcea County

- Location in Romania
- Coordinates: 45.50°N 24.30°E
- Country: Romania
- County: Vâlcea

Government
  - Mayor (2020–2024): Ion Nicolae (PNL)
- Area: 254.77 km^{2} (98.37 sq mi)
- Elevation: 346 m (1,135 ft)
- Population (2021-12-01): 2,484
  - Density: 9.750/km^{2} (25.25/sq mi)
- Time zone: UTC+02:00 (EET)
  - Summer (DST): UTC+03:00 (EEST)
- Postal code: 247087
- Area code: +(40) 250
- Vehicle reg.: VL
- Website: comunacaineni.ro

Câineni is a commune located in Vâlcea County, Oltenia, Romania. It is composed of six villages: Câinenii Mari, Câinenii Mici (the commune centre), Greblești, Priloage, Râu Vadului, and Robești.

Historical population
Year	Pop.	±%
2002	2,773	—
2011	2,500	−9.8%
2021	2,484	−0.6%
Source: Census data

== Natives ==
- Cecilia Cuțescu-Storck (1879–1969), painter
- Emilia Vătășoiu (born 1933), artistic gymnast
