= Dragus =

Dragus may refer to

- Drăguș, a commune in Romania
- Drăguș River in Romania
- Maria-Victoria Dragus (born 1994), German-Romanian actress
- Mihai Drăguș (born 1973), Romanian football player

== See also ==
- Dragu (disambiguation)
