= Olteț (disambiguation) =

Olteț may refer to:

- Olteț, a river in Gorj, Vâlcea and Olt Counties, Romania
- Olteț, a village in the commune Viștea, Brașov County, Romania
- Olteț, alternative name for the Drăguș River, Brașov County, Romania
