= Traian Herseni =

Romanian sociologist, historian and psychologist (1907–1980)

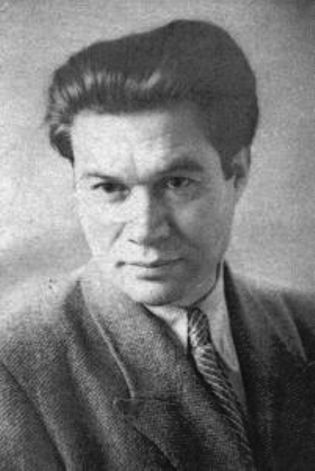
- Born: February 18, 1907; Iași, Brassó County, Austria-Hungary
- Died: July 17, 1980 (aged 73); Bucharest, Socialist Republic of Romania
- Other names: Traian Hariton; Trajan Herseni
- Scientific career
- Fields: Rural sociology; ethnology; ethnography; folkloristics; genealogy; industrial sociology; urban sociology; social psychology; national psychology; sociology of the family; medical sociology; eugenics; biopolitics; geopolitics; epistemology; sociology of literature; cultural anthropology; sociological theory
- Institutions: Romanian Social Institute; Romanian Social Service; University of Bucharest; Cluj University; Ministry of Education; Odessa University; Romanian Academy

Traian Herseni (February 18, 1907 – July 17, 1980) was a Romanian social scientist, journalist, and political figure. First noted as a favorite disciple of Dimitrie Gusti, he helped establish the Romanian school of rural sociology in the 1920s and early 1930s, and took part in interdisciplinary study groups and field trips. A prolific essayist and researcher, he studied isolated human groups across the country, trying to define relations between sociology, ethnography, and cultural anthropology, with an underlying interest in sociological epistemology. He was particularly interested in the peasant cultures and pastoral society of the Făgăraș Mountains. Competing with Anton Golopenția for the role of Gusti's leading disciple, Herseni emerged as the winner in 1937; from 1932, he also held a teaching position at the University of Bucharest.

Herseni became a committed eugenicist and racial scientist, who discarded a moderate left-wing stance to embrace fascism, and parted ways with Gusti over his support for the Iron Guard. He was nevertheless protected during the anti-Guard backlash of 1938, when Gusti made him a clerk within the Social Service, part of the National Renaissance Front apparatus. A leading functionary and ideologue of the fascist National Legionary State, and a figure of cultural and political importance under dictator Ion Antonescu, he proposed the compulsory sterilization of "inferior races", and wrote praises of Nazi racial policy. Indicted by the communist regime in 1951, he spent four years in prison. He made a slow return to favors as a researcher for the Romanian Academy, participating in the resumption of sociological research, as well as experimenting in social psychology and pioneering industrial sociology.

Formally a partisan of Marxism-Leninism after 1956, Herseni was more genuinely committed to national communism. The national communist policies instituted during the late 1960s allowed him to revisit some of his controversial theses about the ancestral roots of Romanian culture. At various intervals, the regime appropriated his radical ideas on ethnicity, including some criticized as racist. Herseni's final works dealt with ethnology, national psychology, the sociology of literature, and sociological theory in general. In the 1970s, he also produced a body of works interpreting Romanian folklore, in which he emphasized the connections with Indo-European and Paleo-Balkan mythology.

== Biography ==
=== Origins and schooling ===
Herseni was a native of Transylvania, which, for most of his childhood, was an Austro-Hungarian province. His home village was Iași (Jás), in what was then Brassó County (present-day Brașov County), where his father worked as a notary public. On his paternal side, Herseni originated from nearby Hârseni, which apparently gave the family its name; several families of that name exist throughout the area, suggesting that the anthroponym precedes the geographical location—one theory, advanced by historian Augustin Bunea, is that all Hersenis originate with an Istro-Romanian clan, itself dubbed "Hersenicus". By the time of his death, the sociologist was recorded as a member of the Roman Catholic community. Born on February 18, 1907, Herseni went to school in Iași (1912–1915) and Făgăraș (1915–1924), graduating in 1924 from the Radu Negru High School. These years coincided with World War I and the recognition of Transylvania's union with Romania: Herseni began his secondary education in a Hungarian-speaking regimen, and passed his baccalaureate examination in 1924, as a Romanian national. At the time, he was president of the students' literary club, named in honor of poet George Coșbuc.

From 1924, Herseni was a student at the University of Bucharest Faculty of Law, studying under Gusti, Constantin Rădulescu-Motru, Nicolae Iorga, Ovid Densusianu, and Vasile Pârvan. Passionate about Gusti's attempts to restructure Romanian social science around rural sociology and participant observation, Herseni was taken on board for Gusti's field trips to Nereju (1927) and Fundu Moldovei (1928). Another one of Gusti's students, Henri H. Stahl, first met and befriended him at Nereju, and was impressed by the encounter. Herseni, he writes, "appeared quiet, withdrawn; and yet not lonesome", "ready to take on whoever would oppose him, whether friend or rival". He grasped complex social issues with "rapidity", and "imposed himself as one of the team leaders, obtaining for himself a rank that he would never lose". Herseni was particularly involved in a project to collect data on "pastoral sociology", while Stanciu Stoian observed village schools and Xenia Costa-Foru pioneered studies in the sociology of the family.

Herseni passed his final examination in 1928, having specialized in sociology, psychology, and pedagogy, and presenting a paper on social relations as observed in Fundu Moldovei. This qualified him to teach sociology at the Gheorghe Lazăr National College, where he worked for the following school year. In 1929, he went to Germany for more specialization. He enlisted at the Frederick William (Humboldt) University, where he heard lectures by Werner Sombart, Eduard Spranger, Richard Thurnwald, and Alfred Vierkandt. He published an overview of German sociology in Gusti's Arhiva pentru Știință și Reformă Socială, praising it as a "lively and freely-moving science", and as a good model for sociology in "the less advanced countries".

Herseni returned to Bucharest in 1930, did his obligatory service in the Romanian Land Forces, then took part in expeditions, organized by Gusti's Romanian Social Institute (ISR), to Drăguș, Runcu, and Cornova. Drăguș, a center of the ethnographic region known as Țara Oltului, was selected on his insistence, being located in close proximity to his native village. At Cornova, Herseni focused on the social hierarchies and segregated clans of a Bessarabian community. He spent some time researching on his own at a sheepcote in the Făgăraș Mountains, publishing his results in Boabe de grâu review. He also began contributing to the Cluj magazine Societatea de Mâine, with articles that inventoried and examined the various kinds of social distance.

=== As Gusti's aide ===
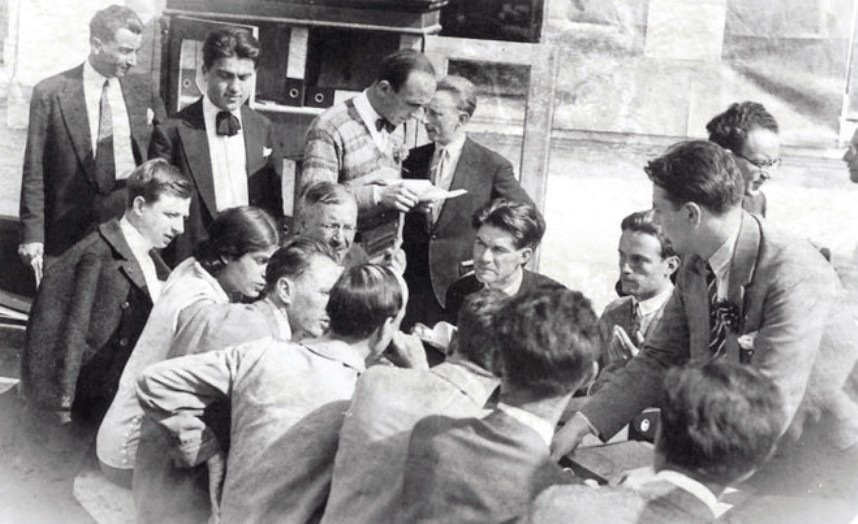
Herseni (seated, center, facing the viewer), with Dimitrie Gusti, Henri H. Stahl, Xenia Costa-Foru and other sociological team leaders. Drăguș, 1931

In 1932, Herseni married a university and ISR colleague, Paula Gusty. She was the daughter of Paul Gusty, a famous theater director (the similarity in surnames makes it likely, but not certain, that she was related to Gusti himself). Also that year, having lectured for a while at Sabin Manuilă's School of Social Work, Herseni was appointed by Gusti's an assistant professor in the University of Bucharest department of sociology, ethics and politics. Stahl claims to have been Gusti's first choice, but to have declined the position in order to suit Herseni, who, as a married man, needed a steady flow of income. As a result, Herseni was slightly better off financially than other intellectuals of his generation.

Herseni also followed Stahl's political options: he sympathized with the left-wing cell within the National Peasants' Party, and, in 1933, contributed to center-left reviews such as Zaharia Stancu's Azi and Stahl's own Stânga. He declared himself a partisan of "social democracy" and class collaboration, "not a Marxist, and not a communist, but nevertheless a man of the left". An article he published in Gând Românesc in early 1933 shows him as a deist and Christian existentialist, who argued that the Übermensch where those Christians who could attain a state of grace. The rest of the populace, Herseni argued, "are forever non-human." Emil Cioran, a philosopher of that generation, described Herseni as "passionate" about "Heidegger's existential philosophy", with a "metaphysical sensibility" that was the mark of "true Transylvanian intellectuals, as if to compensate for the petty bourgeois spirit of middle-of-the-road intellectuals".

In 1933, shortly after the Nazi seizure of power, Herseni visited Berlin, befriending there the anti-Nazi Romanian Petre Pandrea. He took his Ph.D. in 1934, with the dissertation paper Realitatea socială ("Social Reality"), an "essay in regional ontology". It earned praise from Gusti, who called Herseni "one of the most gifted and educated [youths] of today's generation", one promising to "enrich Romanian sociology and philosophy with very valuable works." Stahl recalls that only Herseni could match his teacher's "surprisingly vast erudition" and "systematization" of received knowledge; he was also among the more loyal of Gusti's gifted disciples, effectively replacing Petre Andrei, who had spoken out against the ISR. Herseni was an enthusiastic promoter of sociological campaigns, famous as the ISR's "polygraph" and as Gusti's most orthodox interpreter.

According to Stahl, Herseni intended to both popularize sociology and give it "philosophical depth", treating the two tasks as equally important. Taking a neo-Kantian approach to science, Herseni believed that a sound phenomenological inquiry needed to clarify the position and limits of social constructionism, or, as Stahl puts it, to find out "whether there is a 'social' reality, as distinct from 'natural' and 'spiritual' realities." Moreover, Herseni explored the challenges of sociological epistemology and the methodology of participant observation. He believed that objectivity could only be attained with self-imposed limitations and a laborious, preferably collective and interdisciplinary, research program. Herseni declared in 1934 that he followed Ernst Kantorowicz, who had defined sociology as, above all, an experimental science. Also that year, he spoke out in support of Cioran and Constantin Noica's subjectivism, positing that philosophy needed to be understood as inherently separate from science.

Largely "empirical", Herseni and Stahl's sociology nevertheless took its distance from the "transcendentalist" approach of social scientists such as Mircea Vulcănescu, with whom they first clashed in Fundu Moldovei. By 1938, their highly localized qualitative approach was conceding ground to a quantitative "zonal" tactic, which was favored by Gusti and Anton Golopenția. Herseni adopted a tactic of publishing his work in stages, from raw studies in Societatea de Mâine to monographic series, and finally to synthetic volumes and brochures. One such work was printed at Gusti's expense, as Monografia sociologică; rostul, metoda și problemele ei ("The Sociological Monograph; Its Purpose, Method and Issues"), then reissued in 1934 as Teoria monografiei sociologice ("The Theory of Sociological Monographs"), to be used as a standard ISR manual. Gusti also backed Herseni's candidature as chair of the University of Cluj sociology department, vacated after Virgil Bărbat's death. The project failed when local academics elected one of their own, Constantin Sudețeanu, and prompted a much-publicized scandal.

=== Fascist dissent ===
Logo of the Social Service, featuring Carol II's royal cypher

Unlike Gusti, Herseni shied away from public speaking, but was one of the ISR speakers at the 12th Congress of the International Institute of Sociology (IIS), held in Brussels in August 1935. He continued to publish his sociological sketches in various magazines and newspapers. In addition to Societatea de Mâine, Gând Românesc, and the ISR's Arhiva pentru Știință și Reformă Socială and Sociologie Românească, these include Familia, Tribuna, Revista Fundațiilor Regale, Independența Economică, and Semne. Herseni was also a social-science columnist for Viața Românească, added to the editorial team by Mihai Ralea, the left-wing sociologist. Falling more in line with the Societatea de Mâine group, and influenced by physician Iuliu Moldovan, Herseni became a visible supporter of eugenics and biopolitics, introducing eugenicist language to works he wrote alongside Gusti. This interest soon veered into scientific racism and fascism, possibly inspired to Herseni by another eugenicist, Iordache Făcăoaru; like Făcăoaru, Herseni viewed antisemitism as natural and beneficent, eventually affiliating with the radically fascist Iron Guard. In 1944, Herseni described his joining of the Guard as a conscious rebellion against the establishment, prompted by his losing the (supposedly rigged) competition at Cluj. He was, according to cultural historian Lucian Boia, one of the more notorious Iron Guard figures among the university staff, in line with P. P. Panaitescu, Radu Meitani, Vladimir Dumitrescu, and Radu Gyr.

Their extremist position was conspicuous enough that the more centrist Moldovan felt obliged to distance himself from both his disciples. By 1935, Herseni had also come to sympathize with a fascist dissidence which divided the Gustian movement: although attacked by Ernest Bernea in Rânduiala magazine, which spoke for this counter-current, he parted ways with Stahl over political stances. At the time, moderate left-wingers such as Stahl and Golopenția, witnessing the internecine conflicts between the Guardist supporters and the radical-left group headed by Gheorghe Vlădescu-Răcoasa, began equating Herseni's politics with an egotistic social climbing. Herseni's Iron Guard affiliation also ruined his relationship with Gusti: he abandoned his editorial office at the ISR's magazine, Sociologie Românească, to be replaced by Golopenția, who was now Gusti's most treasured companion. Herseni also lost his post of assistant professor at the university, moving closer to the regional sociological school of Bukovina, which was headed by Guardist Traian Brăileanu, becoming a regular contributor to Brăileanu's journal Însemnări Sociologice. Together with his wife, who was acting as his secretary and unsigned co-author, he returned to Țara Oltului to study the youth "posses" (cetele de feciori).

Herseni's split from the Bucharest school was not definitive: in 1935, together with Gusti, he wrote the sociology textbook for high school seniors. The next year, he participated in the ethnographic expedition to Șanț, alongside Gusti, Stoian, Constantin Brăiloiu, Lena Constante, Jacques Lassaigne, Jozsef Venczel, and Harry Brauner, and contributed to a special homage issue of Arhiva, where he honored Gusti's "sociological, ethical and political system". He and Gusti also published, at Cartea Românească, Elemente de sociologie cu aplicări la cunoașterea țării și a neamului nostru ("Elements of Sociology as Applied to the Study of Our Country and Our Nation"), a geopolitical tract. It was partly inspired by, and partly opposed to, the theories of Friedrich Ratzel, and was highly skeptical of both geographical and biological determinism.

Herseni was able to outmaneuver his rival Golopenția, who was largely absent from the country during that interval. When he returned, Herseni offered a "truce", which included ceding Golopenția some of his classes at university. In 1937, Gusti included Herseni on his team for the IIS Congress, which was held in tandem with Paris Expo. He lectured there on the "social equilibrium of the Romanian village". Herseni alternated such work with political writing. Also in 1937, he wrote a propaganda tract for the Iron Guard and the workers' movement, which was confiscated by the authorities upon publication. The text was a polemic with the Communist Party, which Herseni described as having a "Jewish doctrine", whereas the Guard genuinely represented workers. As noted by historian Adrian Cioflâncă, Herseni's credo had "great similarities with communist discourse", endorsing nationalization, a minimum wage, and social insurance, and a "work-based hierarchy" throughout society.

From 1938, democracy was suspended in Romania, and King Carol II, an enemy of the Iron Guard, took charge of political and social affairs, ending democratic rule. The Iron Guard was repressed, with its leader, Corneliu Zelea Codreanu, being seized and made to stand trial. In May 1938, Harseni appeared as one of Codreanu's 27 defense witnesses. Gusti was co-opted into Carol's dictatorial project, and assigned to lead the Social Service, which, as Stahl notes, was a positive venue for social improvement, but also a potential "tool" for Carol's authoritarianism. Despite his Guard affiliation and his approval of the death squads, for which he was denounced by Stancu in Azi, Herseni was spared scrutiny, and probably never detained. Resuming his work at the university, he evaluated Jewish students such as Theodor Magder. According to Magder, Herseni showed himself to be "very demanding, but also very fair", in that he did not discriminate on an ethnic basis.

Drafting Herseni into the Social Service, Gusti assigned him to teach a specialized course in rural sociology at the Bucharest sociology department, making him a referent and director of research at the ISR. There was also a rapprochement between Gusti and Brăileanu, which Herseni himself mediated. During July 1938, Herseni, Stahl and Vlădescu-Răcoasa were in Paris, attending the IIS 13th Congress, which voted to hold its next session in Bucharest. He also directed rural sociology campaigns in Țara Oltului, publishing his findings as a series of volumes. These were set to mark the IIS congress, which was ultimately canceled by World War II. He published fragments from his history of sociology courses in various installments between 1938 and 1941 as well as a manual on the drawing of sociograms.

=== National Legionary doctrinaire ===
Carol formalized the single-party state in December 1938, establishing a "National Renaissance Front". In January 1939, by signing a letter drafted by Gusti, Herseni, Golopenția and Stahl were welcomed into this new group (other signatories included Al. Lascarov-Moldovanu and Victor Ion Popa). In January 1940, Herseni was still affiliated with the Carlist regime, overseeing the creation of a state-sponsored National Students' Front; at the time, his wife was working as a schoolteacher in Petru Rareș, south of Bucharest. The looming threat of war and Romania's rapprochement with Nazi Germany sent the Gusti school into its final crisis: in summer 1940, Stahl was drafted and sent to work on the "futile" task of building up defenses; Herseni helped him obtain his Ph.D., intervening with the university leadership. This was just before the downfall of the National Renaissance Front, brought on by the Second Vienna Award, which saw Romania ceding Northern Transylvania to Hungary. In the political chaos that followed, Gusti became a political suspect, and Carol ordered his own Social Service to be shut down by Siguranța policemen. The Prime Minister of the time, Constantin Argetoianu, later referred to the Service as a "bad memory".

On September 6, 1940, the Iron Guard took power in Romania, proclaiming the National Legionary State, with General Ion Antonescu as the Conducător. Herseni, emerging as a "major propagandist" and "prominent legionary ideologue", saluted the takeover in his articles for the Guardist paper Cuvântul. In December 1940, he paid homage to the Legionary Commandant, Horia Sima, without whom "the Movement would become an amorphous mass". In order to succeed, Sima was to be obeyed "with unbounded devotion." Herseni also contributed to the personality cult surrounding Sima's predecessor, Codreanu, who had been assassinated by Carol; Herseni called him a "national prophet" of the "imperial ways", for whose arrival "our people have been praying for two thousand years". Codreanu's "spirit", Herseni claimed, "leads the nation to victory." He argued that Codreanu's sacrifice guaranteed "the redemption of the Romanians", but warned that "hundreds and thousands of years have prepared his birth, other hundreds and thousands of years will be necessary for the accomplishment of his commandments". Despite his radical metaphors, Herseni's ideological texts toned down Codreanu's stance on the peasant issue, reinterpreting it as a self-help guideline rather than as a revolutionary agenda for land reform.

Cuvântul also hosted Herseni's articles on the merger of eugenics and racism, for "the betterment of the human race". He declared that Romanians were, at core, part of the "Nordic race", which accounted for "the most noble Romanian cultural productions", but that "the race lost its purity". Herseni suggested a "racial purification", and a formal policy of racial segregation as "a question of life and death". Crediting "the genius of Adolf Hitler" as in inspiration, he proposed the compulsory sterilization of "inferior races", specifically the Jews, Romanies and Greeks, "as a tribute to beauty, to morality, and in general to perfection." "The decline of the Romanian people", Herseni claimed, "owes itself to the infiltration in our ethnic group of inferior racial elements interbreeding with the blood of [our] ancestors". Historian Radu Ioanid sees these musings as samples of "a typically fascist mentality", in which "the incitement to crime clothes itself in fanciful language." According to scholar Maria Bucur, the racial legislation introduced at the time suggests "some links" to Herseni and Făcăoaru's "aggressively restrictive positions"; Făcăoaru is known to have had a more direct involvement in this program. Scholar M. Benjamin Thorne also notes that, among Iron Guard figures, Herseni and Liviu Stan stood out for their Romaphobia; their identification of the Romanies as racial enemies had no precedent in Guardist discourse.

Herseni was chosen for high office in the new bureaucracy, serving as Secretary General of a combined Ministry of Education and Culture, seconding Minister Brăileanu. He countersigned an order by Antonescu and Brăileanu for the demotion and arrest of Petre Andrei, the previous Minister of Education, who was thus shamed into committing suicide. Herseni soon found himself drawn into the conflict between Sima and Antonescu, over the appointment of Guard loyalists at the Accademia di Romania (Antonescu wanted the old regime figures to be kept in place). By the close of 1940, Herseni and Făcăoaru were co-opted by Rector Panaitescu on the university review commission, whose mission was to purge academia of undesirables in general, and in particular of former National Renaissance Front dignitaries. Herseni was thus a participant in the decisions to expel or demote a number of scholars: Ralea, historian Constantin C. Giurescu, philologist George Călinescu, and classicist Alexandru Rosetti. The same commission also looked into cases of low-ranking staff members, suspect for being Jewish or associating with Jews: it expelled George Emil Palade for his "links with the Jews" and "immoral behavior", and nearly demoted Tudor Vianu, on grounds that "kikes cannot educate the Romanian youth". Credited with having intervened in Vianu's favor, Herseni recused himself from the case against Gusti, noting that he owed him his career in academia.

=== The Antonescu years ===
Ralea was arrested by the authorities during November 1940, and possibly slated for an extrajudicial killing by he Guard, but (according to his own testimony) Herseni intervened and rescued his life. According to his friend Pandrea, Herseni himself was eventually sidelined by the National Legionary regime, after being denounced by lecturer Sorin Pavel—who had married Herseni's sister. In January 1941, the Guard and Antonescu went to war with each other, in what was termed the "Legionary Rebellion"; Antonescu emerged victorious. Herseni, now perceived as a "moderate" or "decent" Guardist, was able to escape the subsequent purge, and made his peace with the new military regime. Reportedly, he resumed his contacts with Ralea, assuring him that Sima, by then disgraced and in exile, had tried to curb his own party's violence. In May of that year, Revista de Studii Sociologice și Muncitorești hosted Herseni's homage piece to the economist Virgil Madgearu, who had been murdered by the Guard a year before. A year later, Sociologie Românească published Herseni's posthumous tribute to Andrei, referring to his "great stature" and "untimely death".

He resumed his scientific contribution with a treatise on the sociology of pastoralism (Tratat de sociologie pastorală), sponsored by the Romanian Academy, which was in some part a polemical study of folkloristics. Herseni condemned folklorists for working "at random", and asserted that ethnography in general needed to submit itself to the sociological method. He also contributed a chapter on Romanian sociology, including a sketch on himself, to a history of Romanian philosophy, put out in 1941 by Nicolae Bagdasar. He justified his own inclusion by noting that "our [Herseni's] sociological activity has been recorded, through not always praised, by the country's greatest sociologists and a few foreign ones". Herseni also sketched there the results of his epistemological inquiries: society was an objective inner reality, "the sense of an us", leading to the emergence of a "social community" that was therefore not biological, but spiritual. On this basis, Herseni read society as both a "spiritually objective" reality and a structural-functional one, and thus as an autonomous object of science.

Since June 1941, Romania had joined Nazi Germany in its invasion of the Soviet Union. From January 1942, Herseni was behind the lines on the Eastern Front, in the newly occupied Transnistria Governorate. Reportedly, his mission was to set up schools for the Romanian communities. He was also mandated by Governor Gheorghe Alexianu to carry out a large ethnographic project, recording Romanian Transnistrian customs. The endeavor, which also involved Golopenția and Nichita Smochină, resulted in ethnographic collections by Gheorghe Pavelescu and C. A. Ionescu, with prefaces by Herseni himself. Resigning from the ISR that same year, Herseni moved to Sibiu to teach "national sociology" at the University of Cluj. The latter had been evacuated from its namesake city, in Northern Transylvania. As a eugenicist, Herseni also presided over a department of "sanitary sociology" at Sibiu's Hygiene and Public Health Institute. He was also interested in what he termed "administrative sociology". The official journal of Internal Affairs carried his topical essay, in which Herseni also called for a purely Romanian style of governance.

During July–August 1944, Herseni organized another survey of folk traditions in southern Transnistria, having set up a research institute within Odessa University. In early 1944, during the Soviet offensive in Transnistria, Herseni was spotted in Berezovca County, on an official mission to destroy records of the mass killings of Jews. In September 1944, after the coup which toppled Antonescu and introduced a Soviet occupation, he was altogether suspended from academia. He was arrested by the Siguranța during a round-up, but in December he was among the 107 Guardists paroled and allowed to visit their families. The fact became known to the communist press, and prompted the Sănătescu government to arrest those responsible, including Colonel Manolescu. Herseni's ethnographic research immediately became taboo: the study he wrote with Ionescu was printed at Sibiu in December 1944, but simply as a collection of generic colinde. All detail permitting localization in Transnistria was stricken out by the censors.

=== Imprisonment, marginalization, recovery ===
Herseni's name was published on a list of 65 former dignitaries indicted by the Rădescu government as responsible for "bringing disaster upon the country". He was subsequently re-arrested on January 29, 1945, but released a while after. Expelled from his Cluj University chair in July 1945, he managed to publish one more brochure, with Editura Clujana of Bucharest: Originile sociologiei ("The Origins of Sociology"). Herseni's sister died of cancer that same year, leaving Herseni's nephews with almost no means to support themselves. Herseni himself was reportedly still working at the Hygiene and Public Health Institute in early 1946. This caught the eye of a National Liberal minister, Mihail Romaniceanu, who asked his colleagues to explain why a "prominent Guardist" was still eligible for such offices, whereas lesser ones were being purged.

Again arrested on May 4, 1951, Herseni was tried for his role in the National Legionary administration, with Vianu showing up to defend him as a character witness. Sentenced to four years in prison, he did time in Jilava and Aiud penitentiaries, before being released on September 29, 1955. He still remained under an interdiction to publish and was entirely marginalized in society, turning to ghostwriting for more politically suitable scholars. His old political enemy, Ralea, decided to include Herseni on his research team at the Romanian Academy's new Psychology Institute from 1956. Securitate sources report that he was the person actually in charge of that foundation, since Ralea would only appear there for a couple of hours per week. Herseni was officially only a regional director, and had a similar office at the Anthropological Center (both 1958). He was undergoing a slow rehabilitation, possibly facilitated by Communist Party activist Miron Constantinescu. A former Gustian, turned Marxist-Leninist doctrinaire, Constantinescu had assigned himself the task of selectively reconsidering "reactionary" sociology. Constantinescu maintained contacts with Herseni, Stahl, Vlădescu-Răcoasa and Teodor Bugnariu, and prepared himself for the revival of the sociological school, with inputs from Marxist sociology.

By 1958, Herseni was in correspondence with G. T. Kirileanu, a former librarian of the royal court, who was asking him to look after books he had donated to the Academy. As argued by historian Constantin Prangati, this also made him part of a clandestine intellectual network which "supported national culture, defending the Romanians' language and history, while maintaining faith in the arrival of better times"; other members were Giurescu, Iorgu Iordan, Simion Mehedinți, and Dan Simonescu. Organizing research trips in Hunedoara Region, at Clopotiva, Herseni published essays on family sociology and genealogy in a 1958 collection edited by Ștefan Milcu. He produced a thesis according to which Romanians of that area were "always the overwhelming majority", having effortlessly Romanianized their Hungarian neighbors since the 1600s. As noted in 2014 by ethnologist Marin Constantin, Herseni's approach to the topic evidenced a throwback to the Gusti sociological narrative, being Romanian-centered and "self-referential". Historian of medicine Marius Turda writes that Romanian communist social science was folding back on racial science, a "national biology involving notions of racial differentiation, cycles of growth and decay, genetic genealogies, the interconnectedness of nurture and nature". The changing political climate allowed anthropologists "to reposition autochthonous ideas within their discipline"; Herseni, "an important Legionary sociologist", "provides an exemplary case of post-war re-adaptation, professionally and theoretically."

Bucur similarly argues that Herseni stands as a prime example of an "openly racist" eugenicist whom the communist regime was able to recover for its own propaganda purposes. Turda traces the links between the fascist ideologist and the communist anthropologist: "Although the general topic Herseni reflected on was genetic genealogies, his main argument focused on the importance of ethnic anthropology in connecting forms of the nation's micro and macro physical development over time." The same continuity is noted by historians Alexandru Sonoc and Alexandru Grișcan, who view Herseni's description of the Romanian ethnos as a "somatic type" as "doubtlessly racist". Herseni thus intended to return to his 1940 research and find a way to republish its early results (the papers were by then stored at the Brukenthal National Museum in Sibiu). In 1961, he contributed to Milcu's monograph on the rural society of Bătrâna, focusing on its peculiar inheritance and elderly care practices. His work in the field also resulted in a historical anthropology essay, which rediscovered the pioneering work of Pavel Vasici-Ungureanu.

Ralea, who had been fully integrated among the post-war Marxists, also co-opted Herseni for projects in social psychology. Reportedly, Ralea excused Herseni by arguing that he had only joined the Guard in hopes of being rewarded with tenure. At the time, the mainline communists put on hold their project to uproot sociology as a bourgeois science: "a significant thaw occurred". Together, Ralea and Herseni published a 1962 tract, Sociologia succesului ("The Sociology of Success"), for which Herseni used the pseudonym Traian Hariton. This praise of collectivism and economic incentives under the socialist mode of production was reviewed with skepticism by the Romanian exile psychologist Edgar Krau, who notes that Ralea and "Hariton" had failed to even mention "the all-pervading [communist] party tuition" as a possible disturbance of data. Locally, the book was famous for including a reference to sociology in its very title, the first such work to be allowed under communism; this was one of several "surprising signs of political openness and of sociology's acceptance." Ralea and Herseni also heralded a departure from the more intransigent anti-American propaganda of the 1950s, reintegrating some positive references to American sociology.

=== Return to prominence ===
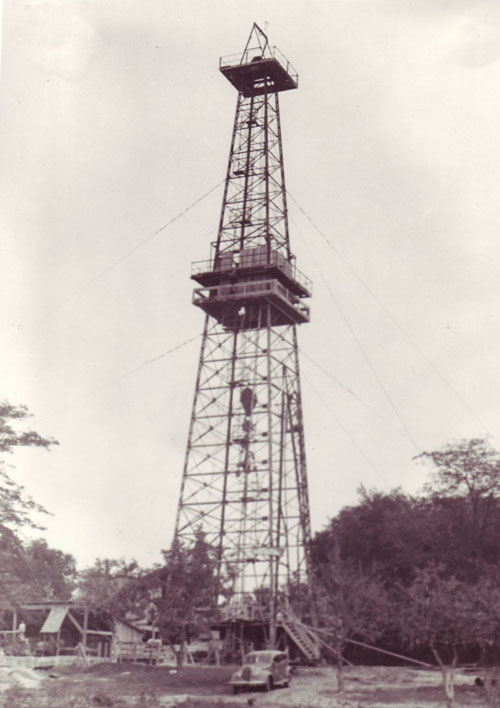
The drilling rig of Boldești-Scăeni in 1959

Shortly after making his return to publishing, Herseni was set to be reactivated as a political writer, at the regime's behest. In early 1963, the propaganda magazine Glasul Patriei was scheduled to reemerge as a venue for reformed and reeducated Iron Guardists; Herseni was reportedly assigned to work on an essay called O eroare fundamentală: concepția legionară despre muncitorime și țărănime ("A Fundamental Error: The Legionary Take on Workers and Peasants"). The same magazine ultimately featured his regular contributions by 1966. Like Ralea and Stahl, Herseni was becoming a noted supporter of the national communist, anti-Soviet, party line, promoted officially by the old party leadership from 1964, and subsequently taken up by the new General Secretary, Nicolae Ceaușescu.

Herseni also involved himself in debates about the future of sociology, defending the science against criticism, and arguing that sociologists could answer specific problems that could not be addressed by statisticians or economists. While gaining leverage with Ralea, he had lost backing from Constantinescu, who perceived him as a personal rival and, possibly, as a superior thinker, and worked to keep him away from sociological research. Herseni worked instead with Bugnariu, with whom he co-authored an essay on the history of Gustian sociology, which appeared in Contemporanul in October 1964. After 1965, when he entered a new period of prolific writing, Herseni sought to accumulate direct knowledge in the field of industrial sociology, reviving and adapting Gusti's (and his own) interwar methodology: a monographic "problem-centered" technique, and a focus on interdisciplinarity. As noted by historian Valentin Săndulescu, he thus wanted to show himself useful to a "potentially valuable" project, that of organizing socialist enterprises.

In a 1968 piece, literary critic Radu Negru proposed that: "One should not fully discount sociologists such as Dimitrie Gusti or Traian Herseni for their deformed political temptations [of the interwar]". As Bucur notes, Herseni was by then in a position where he himself generated "the new Marxist-Leninist normative discourse". In 1967, Familia published his article expressing affinities with the Marxist doctrinaire Athanase Joja; the piece also stated that he had always held quasi-Marxist opinions. Such claims were disputed in the official Marxist journal, Lupta de Clasă, by A. Crișan, who noted: "Traian Herseni has the merit of having made great progress these past years, when it comes to assuming a scientific position in philosophy and sociology. However, when it comes to comparing his views of 1934 with the Marxist worldview, matters should be clearly separated." Four years later, Herseni was arguing that Gusti's sociological school had represented a "collective reaction of our progressive intellectuals against fascist infiltration". This verdict too was disputed by Nicolae S. Dumitru, who noted that it had no grounding in fact; he rates the school as "bourgeois" with "some Marxist tendencies", but not truly anti-fascist.

In 1968, Herseni was allowed to travel abroad, to Paris. There, he reunited with Emil Cioran, but failed to meet with Eugène Ionesco, as transport had been disrupted by strikes and student riots. Back at the institute, he compiled the life histories of 550 industry workers, documenting their departure from an "axial" family and their contact with modernity. Herseni's work in social psychology resulted in a definitive treatise, Psihologie socială, co-authored with Ralea and published in 1966, shortly after Ralea's death. In 1967, Contemporanul hosted Herseni's essay about the old-regime politician Spiru Haret, highlighting his contribution to progressive education and his conflict with "the ruling classes". As a columnist and sociological analyst in Familia, he chronicled books by Pierre Francastel, Herbert Read, Jean Piaget, Talcott Parsons, and T. R. Fyvel, as well as reintroducing his public to works by Gusti, Virgil Bărbat, Alexandru Claudian, and Ștefan Zeletin.

He later set himself a study case of industrialization in Boldești-Scăeni, where, as Stahl recounts, "a drilling rig had been set up, radically transforming the local, rural, social landscape, spurring modernizing social processes". The result was a study in "concrete social psychology", the 1969 Industrializare și urbanizare, which, according to sociologist Irina Tomescu-Dubrow, samples the "valuable work" produced in urban sociology under communism. Additionally, the team documented decades of migration patterns, using a census, a set of questionnaires, and tools borrowed from historical demography. Also in 1969, Herseni issued Psihosociologia organizării întreprinderilor industriale ("The Psycho-sociology of Organization in Industrial Units"), at Editura Academiei, and Laboratorul uzinal de psihologie, sociologie și pedagogie ("The Industrial Laboratory of Psychology, Sociology and Pedagogy"), at Editura Științifică.

Also in 1969, the same company issued Herseni's companion to sociological theory, Prolegomene la teoria sociologică. Reviewing the work for Social Research, Jiří Kolaja sensed "a very skillful adaptation of certain Marxist lines of thought though [Herseni] appears not to be a Marxist." As noted by Kolaja, Prolegomene attempted to mediate between individualist, structuralist, and phenomenological sociology. In 1970, Herseni spoke about his sociological and political convictions in an interview with Tribuna. He defined himself as a committed communist, and made predictions about the communist future: "in communism, people will be less wicked than we are at present, because they shall have fewer rationales for being wicked." The interview was covered for Radio Free Europe by Monica Lovinescu, the anticommunist literary critic. She noted that Herseni, with his "degraded mystical" terminology, no longer distinguished between "sociology" and "ideology". However, according to scholar Daniel Chirot, who visited Romania during that interval, Herseni confessed to him in private:

I used to write things praising 'The Captain' and now I write pretty much the same thing, but praising Ceaușescu. I'm not a Marxist, you understand, but I have to admit that I like what he's doing.

=== Sociologist of literature ===
During the late 1960s and early 1970s, Herseni diversified his contribution, with a chapter in the pastoralist sociology treatise of Franz Ronneberger and Gerhardt Teich (1971) and an essay introducing the work of psychologist Nicolae Vaschide (1975). Other tracts were focused on defining and applying theories from the sociology of literature to a Romanian context. In the mid-1960s, his message (paraphrased by film critic Andrei Strihan) was that: "Under capitalism [...], an owner is enslaved by his assets, he does not advance as a human, but as an owner, he never enriches his own personality, but accomplishes himself only through external things. [...] Socialism replaces the wealth-based principle (to hold) with the existence-based principle (to be)." Herseni sketched out the project in a Luceafărul issue of 1968, welcomed there as a return to professional contributions by Ralea and Călinescu. Coordinating a work called Psihologia culturii de masă ("The Psychology of Mass Culture"), which appeared the following year, Herseni set out to explain the terms of art, and described the "effects of mass culture" among Romanians.

At Editura Univers, Herseni published Sociologia literaturii. Cîteva puncte de reper ("Literary Sociology. A Few Pointers", 1973), and Literatură și civilizație ("Literature and Civilization", 1976). Despite being infused with concepts borrowed from Erich Auerbach, his contribution focused mainly on the relationship between societies and the literature they produced, and as such viewed itself as fundamentally different from comparative literature. Herseni made explicit references to "national psychology", linguistic determinism, and national "rhythms" of creativity, referencing the anthropological theories of Wilhelm Wundt, Franz Boas, George Murdock, and Edward Sapir. He argued that structuralism was a relevant paradigm for the study of culture, but only if subsumed to "national specificity". Overall, Herseni theorized that art and literature were collective in nature, originating from "imitation" (or mimesis) rather than sublimation. Inspired by Lucien Lévy-Bruhl, Constantin Noica, Mircea Eliade, Ruth Benedict, and James George Frazer, Herseni described language and early poetry as interconnected with folk religion, and especially with magic. The works also contained methodological proposals for the research of reading habits, with a typology borrowed from André Maurois.

As noted in 2008 by scholar Eugen Negrici, such writings are also intertwined with the official dogmas of national communism: "still haunted by his old fears, [Herseni] tried to look his best in front of the communist authorities, providing his sociological perspective—one saturated with Marxist cliches—on Romanian literature". By contrast, sociologist Florența Stăvărache argues that Herseni introduced "fissures" in official dogma with his "critical note on how literary doctrines and ideologies were all dealt with through the lens of 'Marxism-Leninism'." Also according to Stăvărache, Herseni's musings about the "social responsibility of writers" and the possibility of their "constrained political engagement" were "evidently alluding to his contemporaries". She criticizes Herseni's abundant use of "erudite" referencing, noting that it made the work outdated: working from inside a "captive society", Herseni had had access to Lévy-Bruhl, but not to his critics.

Herseni took his pension from the Psychology Institute in 1973, but carried on with his work in sociology and anthropology. His studies of industrial sociology were bound together as Psihologia colectivelor de muncă ("The Psychology of Working Collectives", Editura Academiei, 1973) and an eponymous textbook: Sociologia industrială (Editura Didactică și Pedagogică, 1974). According to Stahl, this was both a "world-level work" and a monograph of "our country's real issues", "the result of direct experiences". Herseni's original drafts were "apolitical", treating industrial relations as indistinct from socialist to capitalist countries, and were revised by censors to comply with the party line. Also in 1974, Herseni contributed to an Editura Științifică collection on industrial-sociological laboratories, with a study of social engineering techniques. The following year, returning to his native region, he contributed to a monograph on the Făgăraș Chemical Plant.

=== Final years ===
During the early 1970s, in essays he wrote for Constantinescu's Sociologia Militans archive, Herseni explained his intention of transcending rural sociology, applying its lessons to understanding (or generating) social actions in the national sphere, and, beyond, in geopolitics. In 1976, he completed his "paleoethnographic" study about the "posses" of Țara Oltului, published by Editura Dacia as Forme străvechi de cultură poporană românească ("Ancient Forms of Romanian Folk Culture"). As noted by Stahl, it evidenced "an essential change in his preoccupations", bringing with it Herseni's formal inclusion in the community of Romanian folklorists. The book series also signified a break with the Gustian tradition of strict sociology, turning to cultural anthropology, which the young Herseni had criticized repeatedly. Commenting on this conversion, Stahl concluded that Herseni remained "an enigma".

Forme străvechi claimed to show that the posses were "a vestige of ancient Geto-Dacian beliefs and practices, which still preserve some pre-Indo-European elements." Taking Romanian onomastics as his point of departure, Herseni argued that Romanians conserved a belief in the Tellus Mater and reincarnation within the family. Parts of the work recorded the localization of Christmas, including the "dilution" of an older pagan holiday, or posited that, in the folk psyche, the Virgin Mary had replaced Bendis; in the ancient ballad Miorița, he identified an opposition between patriarchy and matriarchy, as embodied, respectively, by the Sun and Moon. He also reviewed and categorized 400 colinde of Țara Oltului, noting that 88 of them had Christian "non-canonical" content, and another 124 were entirely non- or pre-Christian. Some of Herseni's views on the matter remain particularly controversial. According to Negrici, the book shows Herseni as a convert to protochronism, the communist doctrine (blended with "the undigested residues of the interwar right") which supposed Romanian cultural superiority and ancient pedigree. Herseni "endorses the thesis that Romanian civilization, albeit rural and oral, is by no means inferior to the literate civilizations that were cultivated in citadels and towns." Another topic of criticism was Herseni's claim to have discovered an unknown statute of the posses, by Ion Codru-Drăgușanu, which had in fact been studied decades earlier.

Herseni died in Bucharest in July 1980. On July 19, he was buried in the Catholic section of Bellu Cemetery. News of this reached Cioran in September, leaving him distraught at the loss of his friend of youth. His last published works include a French-language essay on the Dacian Draco, in which he argued that dragons or zmei were among the "primordial beings" of local mythology. According to Paula Gusty-Herseni, his lifetime output comprised 541 works of social science, of which 29 were volumes (although, Stahl cautions, their content often overlapped); Achim Mihu, who republished some of Herseni's works, counts 543. One of his final contributions was the historical study Cultura psihologică românească ("Romanian Psychological Culture"), which sought to establish a link between an ancient national psychology and the development of psychology as a modern science. Additionally, Herseni contributed a chapter in Romulus Vulcănescu's introduction to ethnology, a specialized field which Herseni wanted to delimit from both anthropology and sociology as "the science of folk phenomena". He also left Teoria generală a vieții sociale omenești ("The General Theory of Human Social Life"), a manuscript comprising 1,276 pages, read by Stahl as a final synthesis "of his work in the realm of sociology". Its mission statement described a merger of Gustian and Marxist ideas, around the "objective laws of social development".

Also in 1980, Herseni's essay on the "Romanian race" saw print as Cultura psihologică românească ("Romanian Psychological Culture"); Teoria generală was also eventually published in 1982. Herseni was more fully recovered and discussed after the Romanian Revolution of 1989, which lifted the ban placed by communism over most of his work. Herseni's work in Transnistria was only revisited in 1994, when C. A. Ionescu's book was printed, in its complete form, in Chișinău, Moldova. However, as noted in 2003 by scholar Ionel Necula, he was still not properly appreciated by the intellectual community. As Necula assessed in retrospect, Herseni's work under communism was no more embarrassing than similar contributions by Noica, Lucian Blaga, or Petru Comarnescu—"what [they] wrote under communism is what they would have written under any other regime."

More controversially, Herseni's work was also reclaimed by neo-fascist publications which appeared throughout the 1990s. Anthropologist Zoltán Rostás had by then contacted various of his colleagues, including Paula Gusty-Herseni, publishing his interviews with them in various volumes, including the 2003 Sala luminoasă ("A Lit Room"). She died aged 98. The Hersenis had one daughter, Ioana, a psychologist at the Oil & Gas University. In 2007, she and Marian Diaconu issued his sociological overview, Istoria sociologiei românești ("History of Romanian Sociology"). Marking Herseni's centenary that same year, the Chișinău Academy of Economic Studies hosted a symposium in his honor.
