= Viștea (disambiguation) =

Viștea may refer to several places in Romania:

- Viștea, a commune in Brașov County, or its villages Viștea de Jos and Viștea de Sus
- Viștea, a village in Gârbău Commune, Cluj County
- Viștea Mare, a peak in the Făgăraș Mountains, Brașov County
- Viștea (river), a tributary of the Olt in Brașov County
