= Dragu (disambiguation) =

Dragu is commune in Romania.

Dragu also may refer to:

- Dragu (river), tributary of the Almaș in Sălaj County, Romania

== See also ==
- Drăguș
- Drăgușeni (disambiguation)
- Drăgan (disambiguation)
