= Săvăstreni =

Săvăstreni Recea, Dejani
- Location within Romania

Location
- Country: Romania
- Counties: Brașov County
- Villages: Dejani, Recea, Săvăstreni, Beclean

Physical characteristics
- Mouth: Olt
  - location: Beclean
  - coordinates: 45.8474°N 24.9170°E
- Length: 36 km (22 mi)
- Basin size: 53 km^{2} (20 sq mi)

Basin features
- Progression: Olt→ Danube→ Black Sea
- Tributaries
  - left: Vâlcioara

The Săvăstreni, also known as Recea, is a left tributary of the river Olt in Romania. It discharges into the Olt in Beclean. The upper reach of the river is known as the Dejani. Its length is 36 km (22 mi) and its basin size is 53 km^{2} (20 sq mi).
