= Ioan Boeriu =

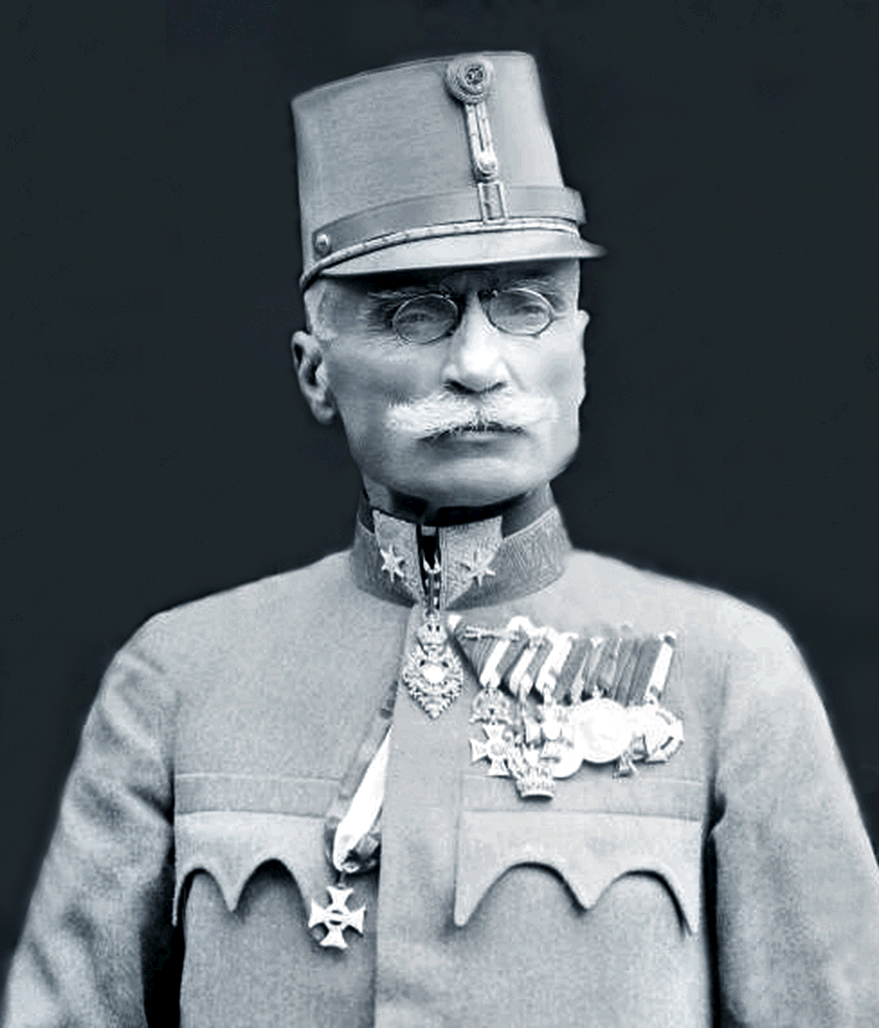
- Ioan Boeriu, baron of Polichna ("Johann Freiherr Boeriu von Polichna")
- Born: Ioan Boeriu; 10 October 1859; Vaida-Recea (now Recea), Austrian Empire
- Died: 2 April 1949 (aged 89) Romania
- Buried: Recea
- Allegiance: Austria-Hungary; Romania
- Branch: Austro-Hungarian Army (until 1918); Romanian Army (1918-1921)
- Service years: 1879–1921
- Rank: Army corps general (Romania); Feldmarschall-leutnant (Austria-Hungary)
- Commands: VII Army Corps; Army of the Romanian Central Military Senate in Vienna; Army of the Directing Council of Transylvania; 76th Infantry Regiment
- Conflicts: First World War; Eastern Front; Hungarian–Romanian War
- Awards: Order of the Crown of Romania; Order of Ferdinand I Military Order of Maria Theresa; Order of the Iron Crown; Order of Leopold; Order of Franz Joseph; Military Merit Cross; Military Merit Medal

Ioan Boeriu, baron of Polichna (10 October 1859 – 2 April 1949), registered as Johann Freiherr Boeriu von Polichna in Austrian records, was an Austrian-born ethnic Romanian Austro-Hungarian officer who served during the First World War. After the dissolution of Austria-Hungary, he commanded the Romanian Central Military Senate in Vienna, and later the army of the Directing Council of Transylvania.

He distinguished himself during the Battle of Polichna, receiving the Order of the Iron Crown 1st class and the Order of Maria Theresa for his actions, also being ennobled with the title of "baron of Polichna".

== Biography ==
=== Early life ===
Ioan Boeriu was born in Vaida-Recea on 10 October 1859. His father, Ioan, was a former Grenz soldier. He attended the Grenz School from Orlat, and after graduating he attended the Gymnasium from Sibiu. His parents wanted him to continue studies in theology, but he followed the advice of one of his mentors, David Urs of Margina, and enrolled in the Cadet School (Kadettenschule) from Sibiu. After finishing his studies at the school, he was assigned to the 68th K.u.k. Infantry Regiment with the rank of Fähnrich in 1879, a year later receiving the rank of Leutnant.

By 1905, Major Boeriu received the command of a battalion from the 76th Infantry Regiment from Esztergom. In 1909 he was advanced to the rank of Oberstleutnant, and in 1914 to the rank of Oberst.

=== World War I ===
After the war started, he took part in the battles on the Eastern Front leading the 76th Infantry Regiment. On 23 August 1914, he was stationed with his unit of 18 battalions and 10 artillery batteries on a 30 km front line at Polichna, near Kraśnik. After 13 hours of effective fighting, his troops managed to repel Russian attacks in the area and capture the village, which led to the Austro-Hungarian victory at the Battle of Kraśnik. For his actions at Polichna, he was decorated with the 1st class of the Order of the Iron Crown receiving the title of "baron of Polichna". Later he also received the Order of Maria Theresa.

In November 1914, he managed to recapture the Russian positions at Jangrot, however, after three days of fighting he requested the retreat of his Regiment which took heavy losses. During the Battle of Sułoszowa, he was gravely injured and evacuated to a hospital in Vienna. Suffering from a disability, he was transferred to the k.u.k. Kriegsministerium (Imperial and Royal Ministry of War) where he remained until the end of the war, working as a military expert for the Ministry. On 11 September 1915, he was promoted to the rank of Generalmajor. During this time, he also visited Transylvania often and began establishing connections with Romanian politicians, such as Ștefan Cicio Pop.

== After the war ==
=== Romanian Central Military Senate in Vienna ===
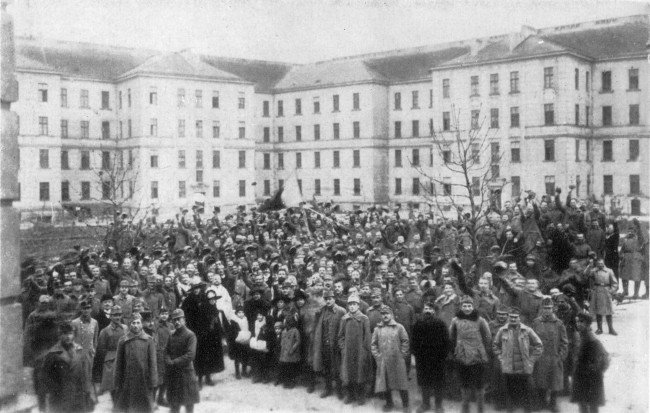
Romanian soldiers in Vienna in 1918

On 31 October 1918, after the Austro-Hungarian armistice, the Romanian Central Military Senate in Vienna was formed with the task of organizing the Romanian soldiers located in the Austrian capital and the surrounding areas, and Boeriu was selected as the commander of its army. On 11 November 1918, Ioan Boeriu received the rank of Feldmarschall-leutnant from Emperor Karl I, before his abdication.

Due to a health problem, Boeriu took over the leadership of the Romanian Central Military Senate on 12 November 1918. On 17 November, the official oath-taking ceremony and the consecration of the Romanian flag was held at the Franz-Ferdinand barracks. At this point, the army led by Boeriu together with Iuliu Maniu numbered around 60,000 soldiers. According to some sources, this number would increase to 150,000 in all of Austria. The Romanian Military Senate, through its two centers in Vienna and Prague, ensured the public order in those cities and stopped an eventual Bolshevik revolution in Vienna. At the same time, the Senate also worked on the repatriation of the Romanian soldiers located on the territory of the former empire.

The last meeting of the Senate happened on 27 November, when Iuliu Maniu announced the Great National Assembly of Alba Iulia which was to be held on 1 December, and proposed the dissolution of the Military Senate. The soldiers began returning to Transylvania, and ensured the public order during the Great Union Day ceremony on 1 December.

=== Directing Council of Transylvania ===
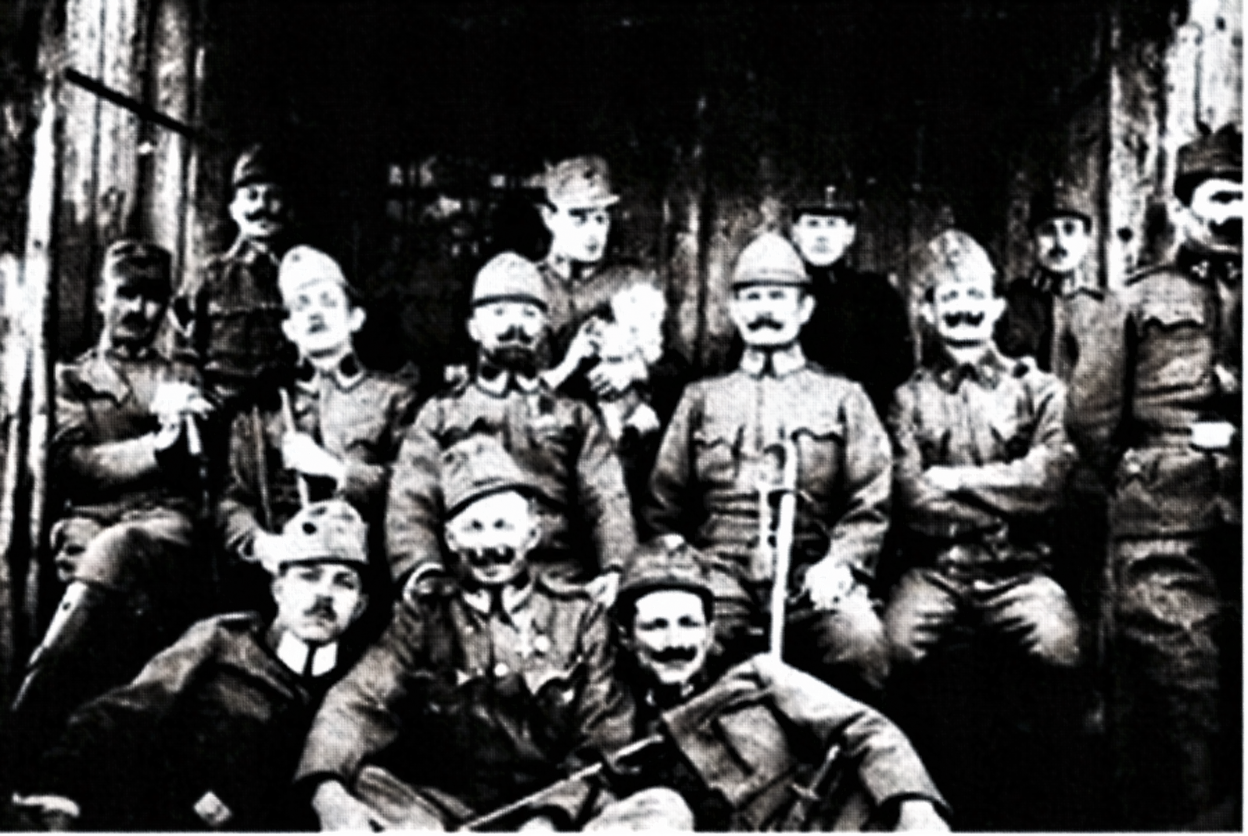
Ioan Boeriu's soldiers in 1919

After the Union Day, Ioan Boeriu received the rank of Divisional general. He arrived in Sibiu on 9 December, and was named commander of the Army of the Directing Council of Transylvania. Throughout December, he participated in various military and cultural activities and events in Sibiu.

Starting on 18 January 1919, the military of Transylvania was taken over by the Transylvanian Army Command subordinated to the Directing Council. Boeriu remained as its commander, with General Dănilă Papp being assigned as his chief of staff. At the end of January, General Traian Moșoiu took over the command, with Boeriu continuing to work closely with the new commander. The Army Command functioned until mid-April when it was replaced by the VI and VII Army Corps. Under this new organization, the Transylvanian soldiers participated in the Hungarian–Romanian War against the Hungarian Soviet Republic.

As commander of the VII Army Corps, he supported the creation of the Military Infantry School No. 2 in Sibiu in 1920, where the former Cadet School was located. In January 1921, he retired from the army, handing over the command of the VII Corps to General Henri Cihoski. On 17 February 1921, he was decorated with the Grand Cross of the Order of the Crown of Romania by King Ferdinand I. In 1924, he received the rank of Army corps general. Eventually, he was also decorated with the Order of Ferdinand I, Grand Officer class.

== Later career and legacy ==
After his retirement, General Boeriu became a founding member of the Transylvanian Association for Romanian Literature and the Culture of the Romanian People. He also participated in politics, becoming a member of the Romanian National Party. In 1929, he was Deputy of Sibiu County and the President of the National Peasants' Party in Sibiu. In 1931, he resigned as President of the party in Sibiu, though later he was elected honorary president on 10 November 1931. Between 1921 and 1922, and 1939–1940, he worked as president of the Administrative Committee of the Border Guard School Fund (Comitetului Administrativ al Fondului Școlar Grăniceresc).

He died on 2 April 1949 and was buried in his native village in Recea. A memorial house was established there after 1989, and the Recea High School "General Ioan Boeriu" is named after him.

== Awards ==
=== Austria-Hungary ===
- Military Merit Medal
- Military Merit Cross
- Order of the Iron Crown, 3rd and 1st class
- Order of Franz Joseph, Knight rank
- Order of Leopold
- Military Order of Maria Theresa, Knight class

=== Romania ===
- Grand Cross of the Order of the Crown of Romania
- Order of Ferdinand I, Grand Officer class

== Bibliography ==
- Bucur, Alexandru (2019). "Activitatea generalului Ioan Boeriu în perioada noiembrie 1918-februarie 1921". Acta Terrae Fogarasiensis (in Romanian) (8/2019). Făgăraș: Negru Vodă.
- Lungoci, Adrian-Dumitru (2021). "Eroi uitați ai marelui război - generalul Ioan Boeriu" (PDF). Magister. No. 34/2021. Sibiu. ISSN 1453-7214.
