= Wojciechów-Kolonia =

- Village
- Location within Poland
- Coordinates: 50°48′33″N 22°20′21″E
- Country: Poland
- Voivodeship: Lublin
- County: Kraśnik
- Gmina: Szastarka

Wojciechów-Kolonia (Polish pronunciation: [vɔjˈt͡ɕɛxuf kɔˈlɔɲa]) is a village in the administrative district of Gmina Szastarka, within Kraśnik County, Lublin Voivodeship, in eastern Poland.
