= Huta Józefów, Lublin Voivodeship =

Huta Józefów
- Village
- Location within Poland
- Coordinates: 50°48′45″N 22°17′16″E
- Country: Poland
- Voivodeship: Lublin
- County: Kraśnik
- Gmina: Szastarka

Huta Józefów (Polish pronunciation: [ˈxuta juˈzɛfuf]) is a village in the administrative district of Gmina Szastarka, within Kraśnik County, Lublin Voivodeship, in eastern Poland.
