= Blinów Drugi =

- Village
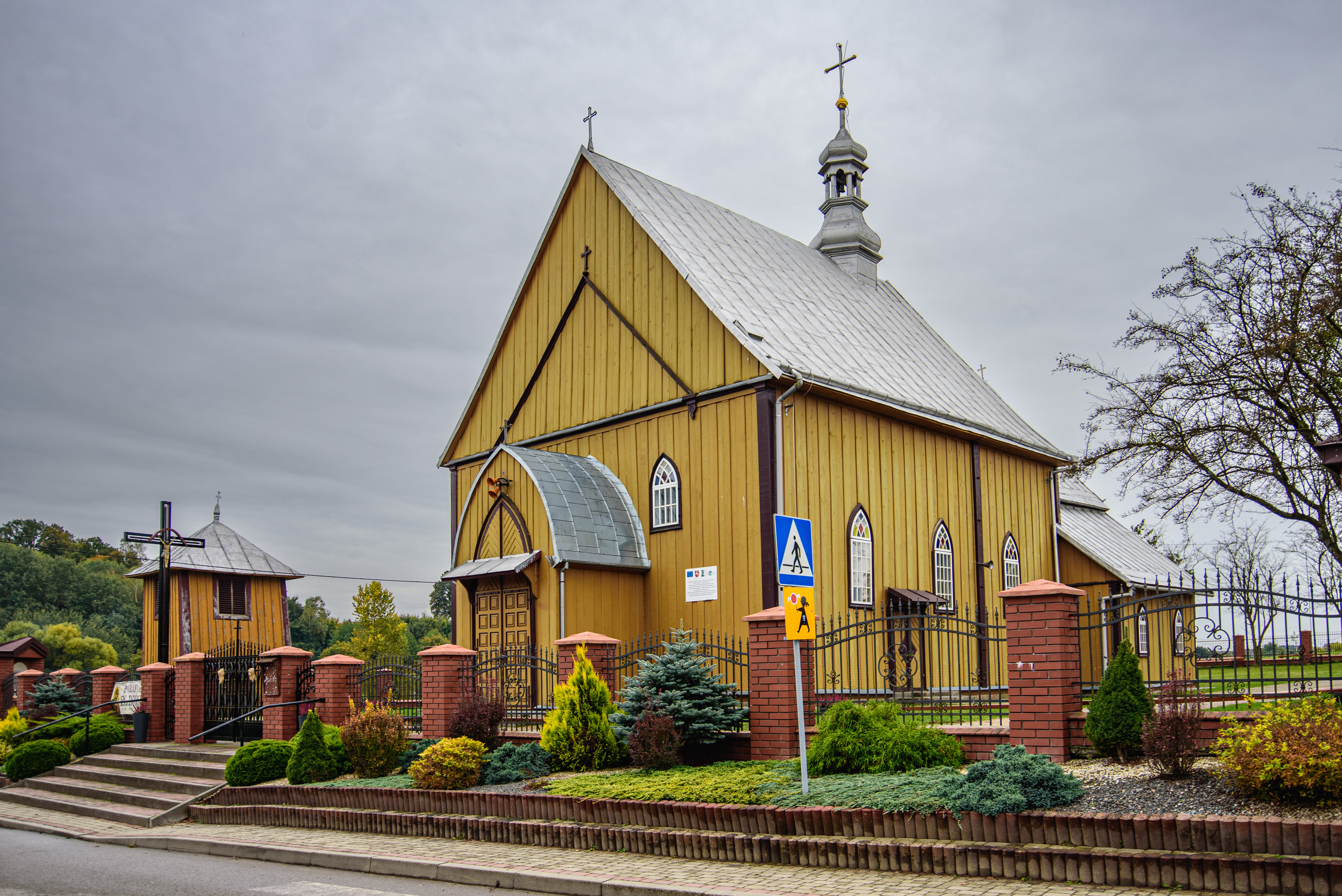
- Saint John the Baptist church in Blinów Drugi

- Location within Poland
- Coordinates: 50°52′53″N 22°23′5″E
- Country: Poland
- Voivodeship: Lublin
- County: Kraśnik
- Gmina: Szastarka
- Time zone: UTC+1 (CET)
  - Summer (DST): UTC+2 (CEST)
- Vehicle registration: LKR

Blinów Drugi [ˈblinuf ˈdruɡi] is a village in the administrative district of Gmina Szastarka, within Kraśnik County, Lublin Voivodeship, in eastern Poland.
