= Majdan-Obleszcze =

- Village
- Location within Poland
- Coordinates: 50°49′44″N 22°22′43″E
- Country: Poland
- Voivodeship: Lublin
- County: Kraśnik
- Gmina: Szastarka

Majdan-Obleszcze (Polish pronunciation: [ˈmajdan ɔˈblɛʂtʂɛ]) is a village in the administrative district of Gmina Szastarka, within Kraśnik County, Lublin Voivodeship, in eastern Poland.
