= Blinów Pierwszy =

- Village
- Location within Poland
- Coordinates: 50°51′59″N 22°23′9″E
- Country: Poland
- Voivodeship: Lublin
- County: Kraśnik
- Gmina: Szastarka
- Time zone: UTC+1 (CET)
  - Summer (DST): UTC+2 (CEST)

Blinów Pierwszy [ˈblinuf ˈpjɛrfʂɨ] is a village in the administrative district of Gmina Szastarka, within Kraśnik County, Lublin Voivodeship, in eastern Poland.

== History ==
Seven Polish citizens were murdered by Nazi Germany in the village during World War II.
