= Ion Codru-Drăgușanu =

Austro-Hungarian–Romanian writer

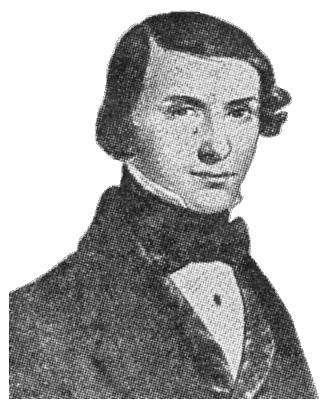
Ion Codru-Drăgușanu

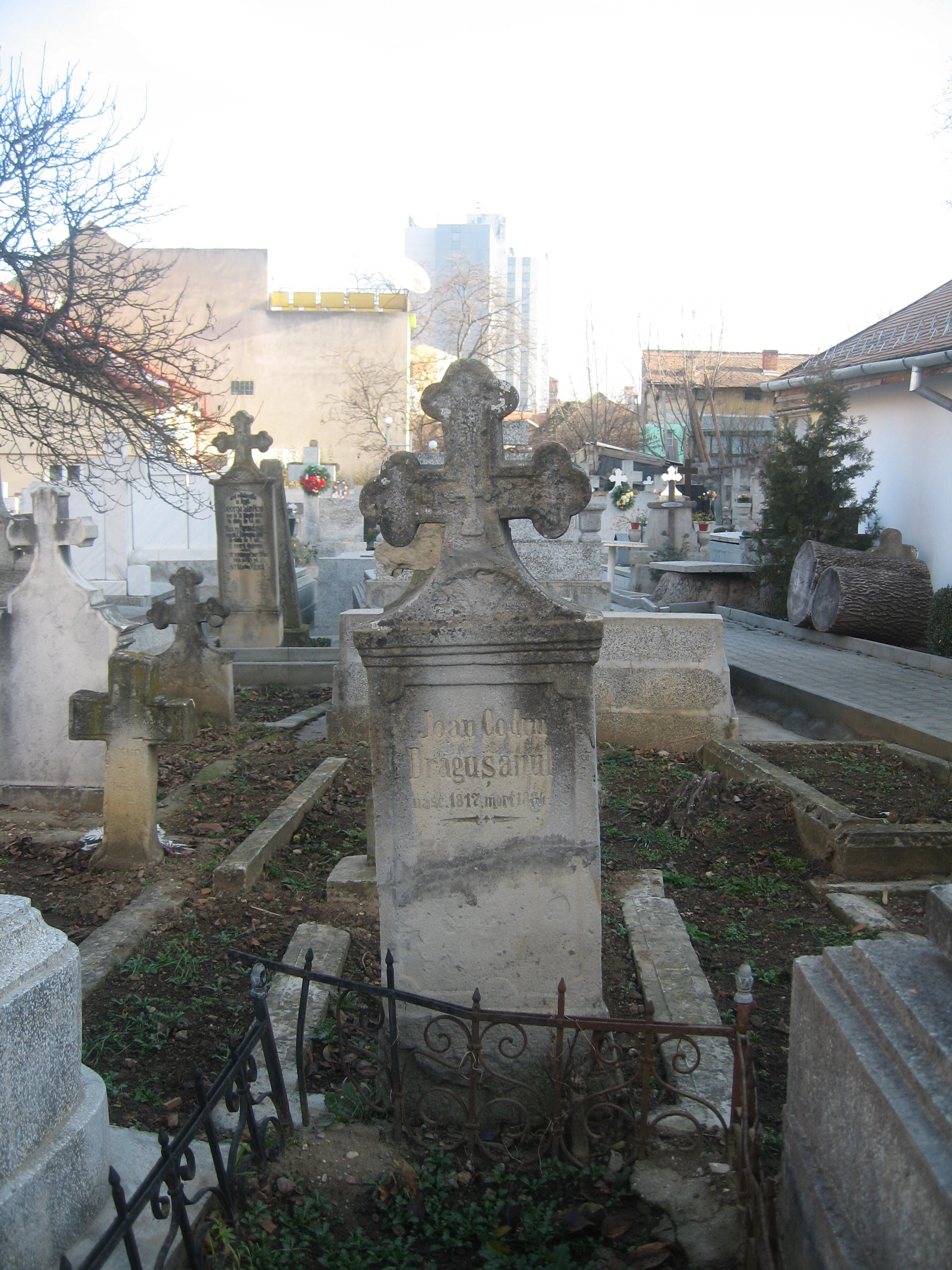
Grave in Sibiu

Ion Codru-Drăgușanu (November 9, 1818–October 26, 1884) was an Austro-Hungarian ethnic Romanian prose writer.

He was born in Drăguș, Brașov County, in the Transylvania region. His parents were Adam Plăiaș Codru or Adam al lui German (in his early years, the writer signed as Ioanne Germaniu Codru) and his wife Asinefta (née Trîmbițaș). His family were soldiers in the Transylvanian Military Frontier, ennobled during the time of Zsuzsanna Lorántffy. He studied at the village school, at the German Military Frontier School in nearby Viștea de Jos and for one semester at Saint Sava College in the Wallachian capital Bucharest, but was largely self-taught. He left Transylvania in 1835 and between 1838 and 1846 made several journeys; his travels took him to Hungary, Austria, Italy, Germany, France, England, Russia and Switzerland. From 1846 to 1848, he worked as a teacher in Ploiești.

He subsequently held several administrative positions in his native province, culminating with that of deputy captain for the Făgăraș district (1863-1880). He was a participant in the Wallachian Revolution of 1848, a deputy for Hațeg in the Transylvanian Diet at Sibiu from 1863, secretary of the Military Frontier School Committee (1880-1884) and vice president of Astra's Făgăraș chapter. His first published work was Cuvânt scholastic, which appeared in Universul newspaper in 1848. He also contributed to Foaie pentru minte, inimă și literatură, Concordia, Albina, Telegraful român, Federațiunea, Gazeta Transilvaniei, Familia and Transilvania. His literary reputation was established by Peregrinul transelvan (1865), among the most interesting travel accounts published in the post-1848 era. He died in Sibiu.
