= Stare Moczydła =

- Village
- Location within Poland
- Coordinates: 50°50′43″N 22°23′41″E
- Country: Poland
- Voivodeship: Lublin
- County: Kraśnik
- Gmina: Szastarka

Stare Moczydła [ˈstarɛ mɔˈt͡ʂɨdwa] is a village in the administrative district of Gmina Szastarka, within Kraśnik County, Lublin Voivodeship, in eastern Poland.
