= Rzeczyca-Kolonia, Kraśnik County =

Rzeczyca-Kolonia
- Village
- Location within Poland
- Coordinates: 50°50′19″N 22°15′54″E
- Country: Poland
- Voivodeship: Lublin
- County: Kraśnik
- Gmina: Szastarka

Rzeczyca-Kolonia [ʐɛˈt͡ʂɨt͡sa kɔˈlɔɲa] is a village in the administrative district of Gmina Szastarka, within Kraśnik County, Lublin Voivodeship, in eastern Poland.
