= Brzozówka-Kolonia =

- Village
- Location within Poland
- Coordinates: 50°50′48″N 22°21′5″E
- Country: Poland
- Voivodeship: Lublin
- County: Kraśnik
- Gmina: Szastarka

Brzozówka-Kolonia [bʐɔˈzufka kɔˈlɔɲa] is a village in the administrative district of Gmina Szastarka, within Kraśnik County, Lublin Voivodeship, in eastern Poland.
