= Recea, Brașov =

Recea
- Commune
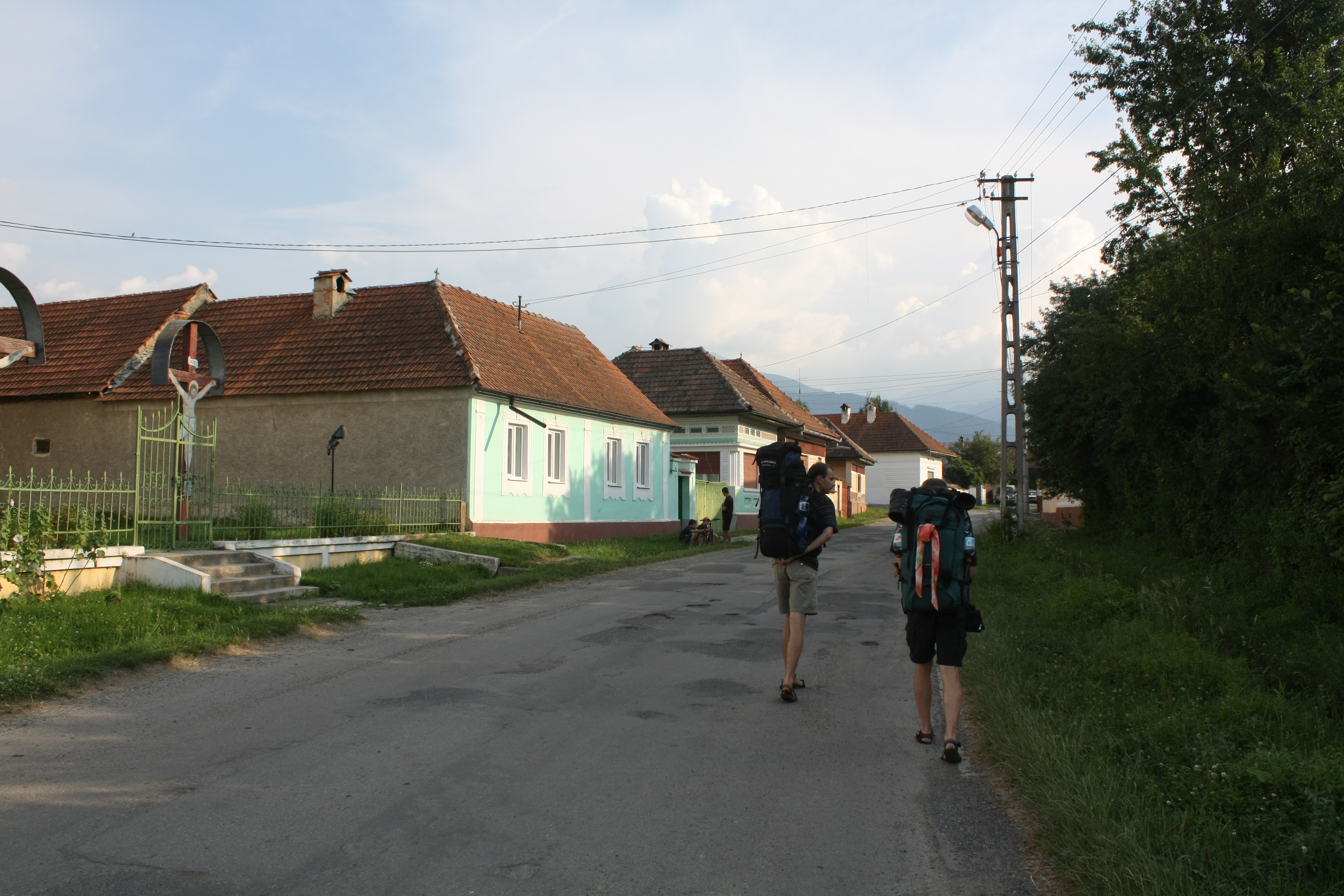

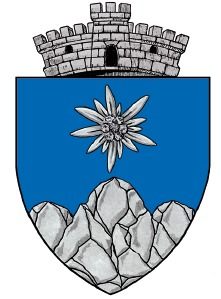
- Coat of arms

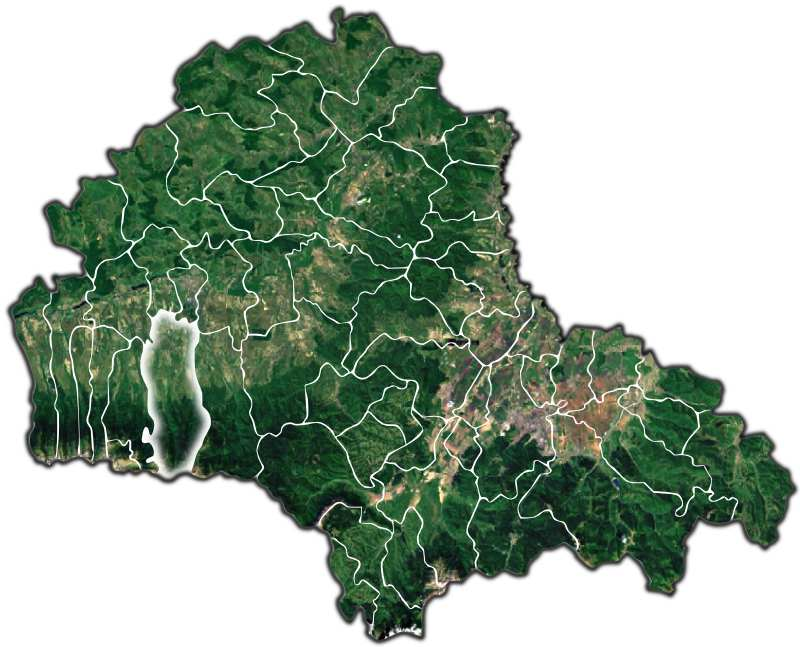
- Location within Brașov County

- Location in Romania
- Coordinates: 45°43′51″N 24°56′41″E
- Country: Romania
- County: Brașov

Government
  - Mayor (2020–2024): Gheorghe Lazea (PNL)
- Area: 159.44 km^{2} (61.56 sq mi)
- Elevation: 545 m (1,788 ft)
- Population (2021-12-01): 3,236
  - Density: 20.30/km^{2} (52.57/sq mi)
- Time zone: UTC+02:00 (EET)
  - Summer (DST): UTC+03:00 (EEST)
- Postal code: 507180
- Area code: +(40) x59
- Vehicle reg.: BV
- Website: comunarecea.ro

Recea (German: Waywodretschen; Hungarian: Vajdarécse) is a commune in Brașov County, Transylvania, Romania. It is composed of seven villages: Berivoi (Berivoj), Dejani (Dezsán), Gura Văii (until 1960 Netotu; Netot), Iași (Jás), Recea, Săsciori (Szeszcsor), and Săvăstreni (Szevesztrény).

The commune is located in Țara Făgărașului, in the western part of the county. It is 15 km (9.3 mi) south of Făgăraș (halfway between the city and the Făgăraș Mountains), 65 km (40 mi) west of Brașov, and 70 km (43 mi) east of Sibiu. It borders Hârseni to the east, Beclean to the north, Lisa and Voila to the west, and Argeș County to the south.

Historical population
Year	Pop.	±%
2002	3,301	—
2011	3,118	−5.5%
2021	3,236	+3.8%
Source: Census data

At the 2021 census, Recea had 3,236 inhabitants, of which 89% were Romanians.

== Natives ==
- Ioan Boeriu (1859–1949), officer who served during World War I
- Traian Herseni (1907–1980), social scientist, journalist, and political figure
- Ion Gavrilă Ogoranu (1923–2006), member of the Iron Guard (1936–1940), leader of an anti-communist paramilitary group (1948–1955)
