= Drăgușeni =

Drăguşeni may refer to:

Romania

- Drăgușeni, Botoșani, a commune in Botoşani County
- Drăgușeni, Galați, a commune in Galaţi County
- Drăgușeni, Iași, a commune in Iaşi County
- Drăguşeni, Suceava, a commune in Suceava County
- Drăguşeni, a village in Turulung Commune, Satu Mare County

Moldova

- Drăguşeni, a village in Bobeica Commune, Hînceşti district
- Drăguşeni, a village in Rădeni, Străşeni

== See also ==
- Drăgan (disambiguation)
