= Szastarka =

- Village
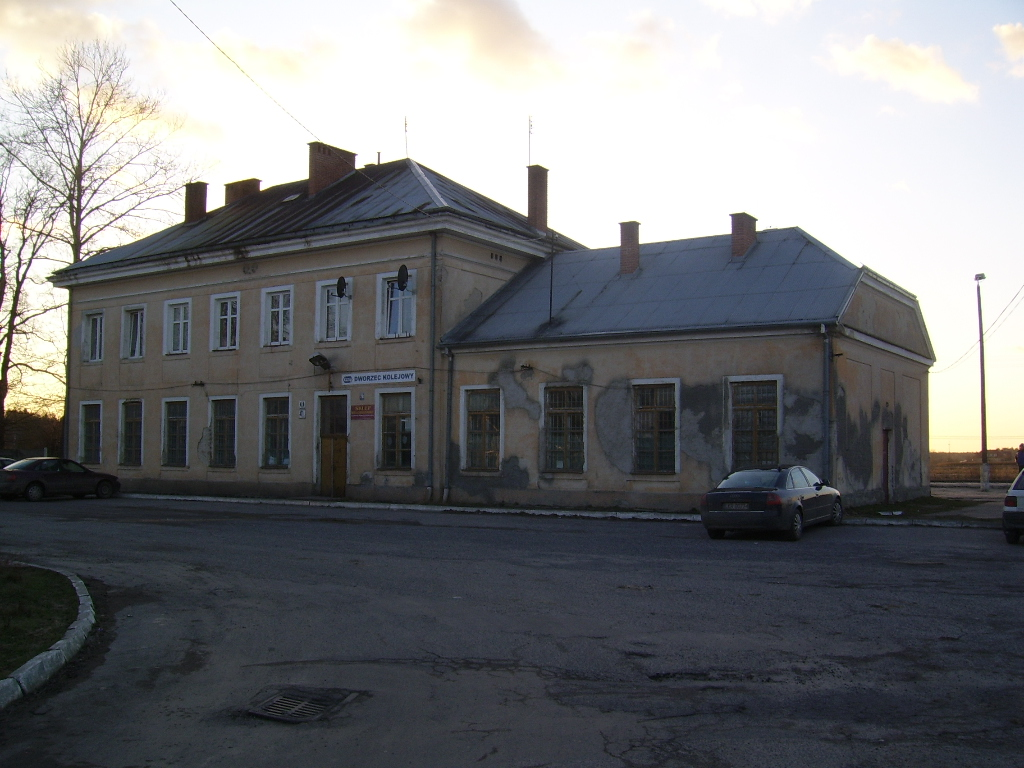
- Train station

- Location within Poland
- Coordinates: 50°51′N 22°20′E
- Country: Poland
- Voivodeship: Lublin
- County: Kraśnik
- Gmina: Szastarka

Szastarka [ʂasˈtarka] is a village in Kraśnik County, Lublin Voivodeship, in eastern Poland. It is the seat of the gmina (administrative district) called Gmina Szastarka.
