= Cieślanki =

- Village
- Location within Poland
- Coordinates: 50°54′N 22°25′E
- Country: Poland
- Voivodeship: Lublin
- County: Kraśnik
- Gmina: Szastarka

Cieślanki [t͡ɕɛˈɕlanki] is a village in the administrative district of Gmina Szastarka, within Kraśnik County, Lublin Voivodeship, in eastern Poland.
