= Brzozówka, Lublin Voivodeship =

Brzozówka
- Village
- Location within Poland
- Coordinates: 50°50′N 22°21′E
- Country: Poland
- Voivodeship: Lublin
- County: Kraśnik
- Gmina: Szastarka

Brzozówka [bʐɔˈzufka] is a village in the administrative district of Gmina Szastarka, within Kraśnik County, Lublin Voivodeship, in eastern Poland.
