= Wojciechów, Kraśnik County =

Wojciechów
- Village
- The wayside shrine in Wojciechów

- Location within Poland
- Coordinates: 50°47′50″N 22°20′36″E
- Country: Poland
- Voivodeship: Lublin
- County: Kraśnik
- Gmina: Szastarka

Wojciechów (Polish pronunciation: [vɔjˈt͡ɕɛxuf]) is a village in the administrative district of Gmina Szastarka, within Kraśnik County, Lublin Voivodeship, in eastern Poland.
