= Beclean, Brașov =

Beclean
- Commune
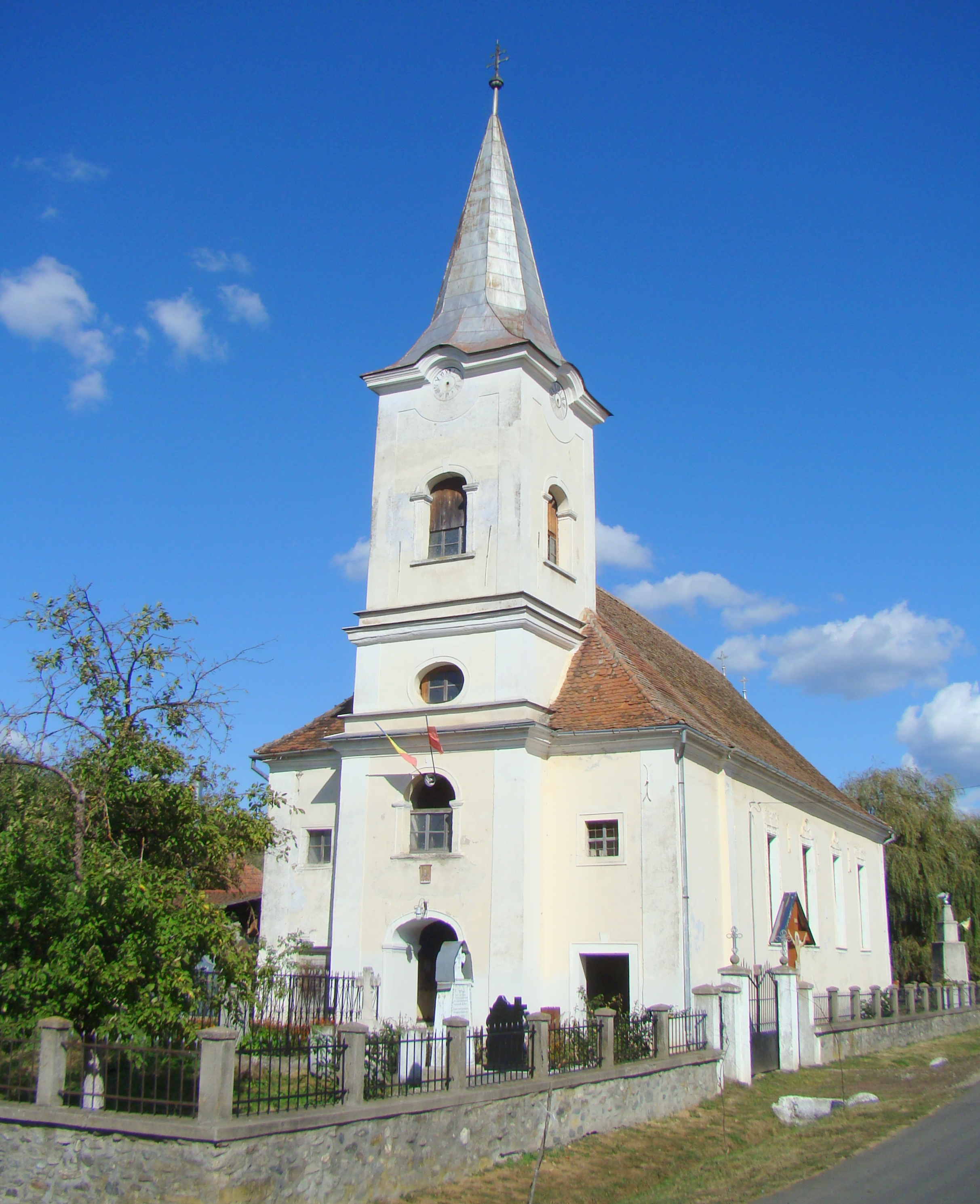
- The Saint Nicholas Church in Calbor

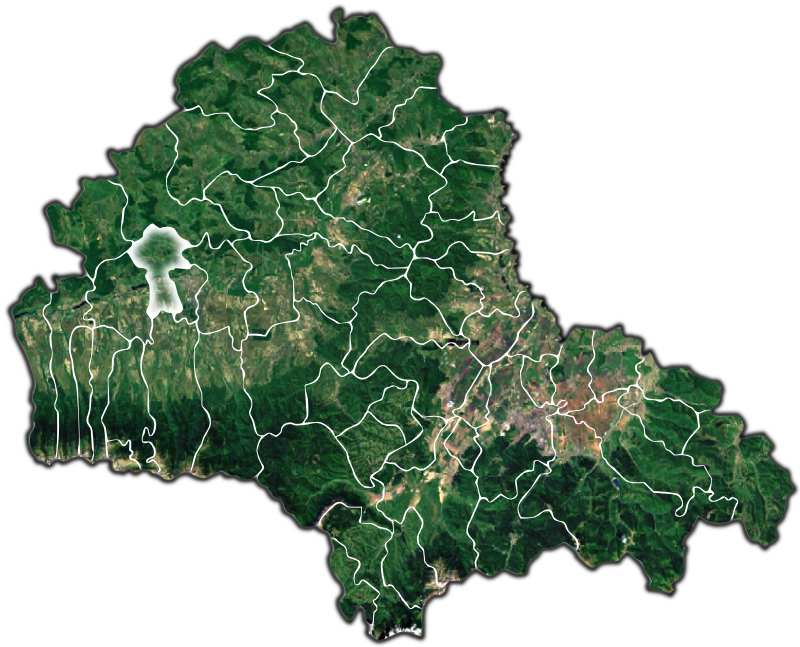
- Location within the county

- Location in Romania
- Coordinates: 45.8333°N 24.9333°E
- Country: Romania
- County: Brașov

Government
  - Mayor (2020–2024): Vasile-Claudiu Motrescu (PNL)
- Area: 72.9963 km^{2} (28.1840 sq mi)
- Elevation: 429 m (1,407 ft)
- Population (2021-12-01): 2,002
  - Density: 27.43/km^{2} (71.03/sq mi)
- Time zone: UTC+02:00 (EET)
  - Summer (DST): UTC+03:00 (EEST)
- Postal code: 507010
- Area code: +(40) 02 68
- Vehicle reg.: BV
- Website: comunabeclean.ro

Beclean (German: Badlinen; Hungarian: Betlen) is a commune in Brașov County, Transylvania, Romania. It is composed of five villages: Beclean, Boholț (Buchholz; Boholc), Calbor (Kaltbrunnen; Kálbor), Hurez (Huréz), and Luța (Luca).

== Geography ==
Beclean is situated in the western part of the county, in the historic Țara Făgărașului region. Located 3 km (1.9 mi) west of Făgăraș, it is crossed by the national road DN1 (part of European route E68); the county seat, Brașov, is 55 km (34 mi) to the east.

The commune lies on the left bank of the Olt River. The river Săvăstreni discharges into the Olt at Beclean.

== Demographics ==
Historical population
Year	Pop.	±%
1880	3,955	—
2002	1,552	−60.8%
2011	1,826	+17.7%
2021	2,002	+9.6%
Source: Census data

At the 2021 census, Beclean had 2,002 inhabitants; of those, 76.67% were Romanians and 15.73% Roma.
