= Rădeni, Strășeni =

Rădeni
- Commune
- Location within Moldova
- Coordinates: 47.2058333333°N 28.7005555556°E
- Country: Moldova
- District: Strășeni District

Population (2014)
  - Total: 3,203
- Time zone: UTC+2 (EET)
  - Summer (DST): UTC+3 (EEST)

Rădeni is a commune in Strășeni District, Moldova. It is composed of three villages: Drăgușeni, Rădeni and Zamciogi.
