= Viștea (river) =

- Location within Romania

Location
- Country: Romania
- Counties: Brașov County
- Villages: Viștea de Sus, Viștea de Jos

Physical characteristics
- Source: Făgăraș Mountains
- Mouth: Olt
  - location: Viștea de Jos
  - coordinates: 45.8044°N 24.7357°E
- Length: 26 km (16 mi)
- Basin size: 50 km^{2} (19 sq mi)

Basin features
- Progression: Olt→ Danube→ Black Sea
- Tributaries
  - right: Viștișoara

The Viștea is a left tributary of the river Olt in Romania. It discharges into the Olt in Viștea de Jos. The source of the Viștea is in the Făgăraș Mountains. Its length is 26 km (16 mi) and its basin size is 50 km^{2} (19 sq mi).
