= Polichna =

- Village
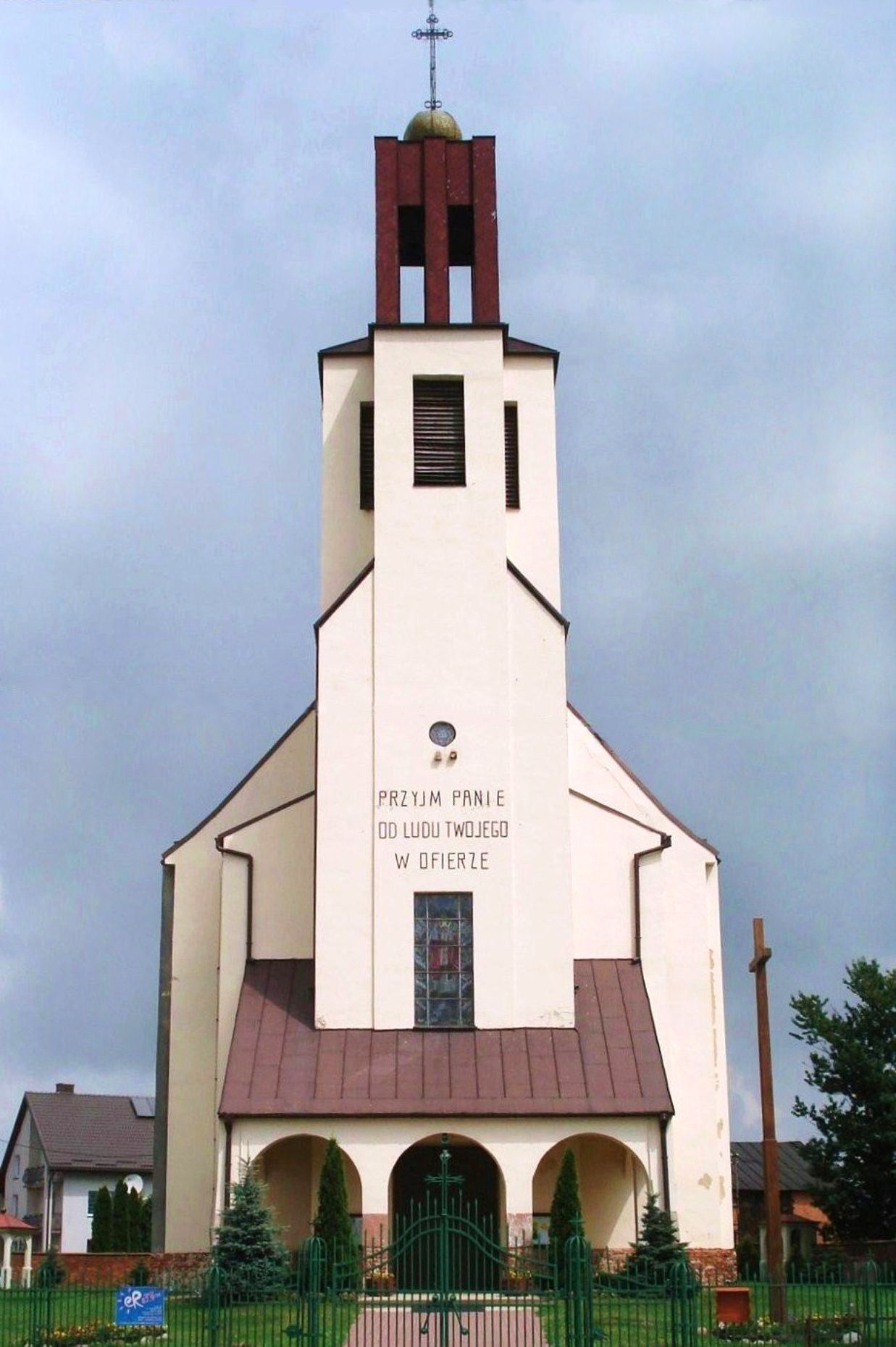
- Saint John Mary Vianney church in Polichna

- Location within Poland
- Coordinates: 50°49′17″N 22°20′1″E
- Country: Poland
- Voivodeship: Lublin
- County: Kraśnik
- Gmina: Szastarka
- Time zone: UTC+1 (CET)
  - Summer (DST): UTC+2 (CEST)

Polichna [pɔˈlixna] is a village in the administrative district of Gmina Szastarka, within Kraśnik County, Lublin Voivodeship, in eastern Poland.

== History ==
Six Polish citizens were murdered by Nazi Germany in the village during World War II.
