= Drăguș (river) =

- Location within Romania

Location
- Country: Romania
- Counties: Brașov County
- Villages: Drăguș, Olteț

Physical characteristics
- Mouth: Olt
  - location: Olteț
  - coordinates: 45.8065°N 24.7571°E
- Length: 13 km (8.1 mi)
- Basin size: 25 km^{2} (9.7 sq mi)

Basin features
- Progression: Olt→ Danube→ Black Sea

The Drăguș is a left tributary of the river Olt in Romania. It discharges into the Olt in Olteț. Its length is 13 km (8.1 mi) and its basin size 25 km^{2} (9.7 sq mi).
