= Drăguș =

- Commune
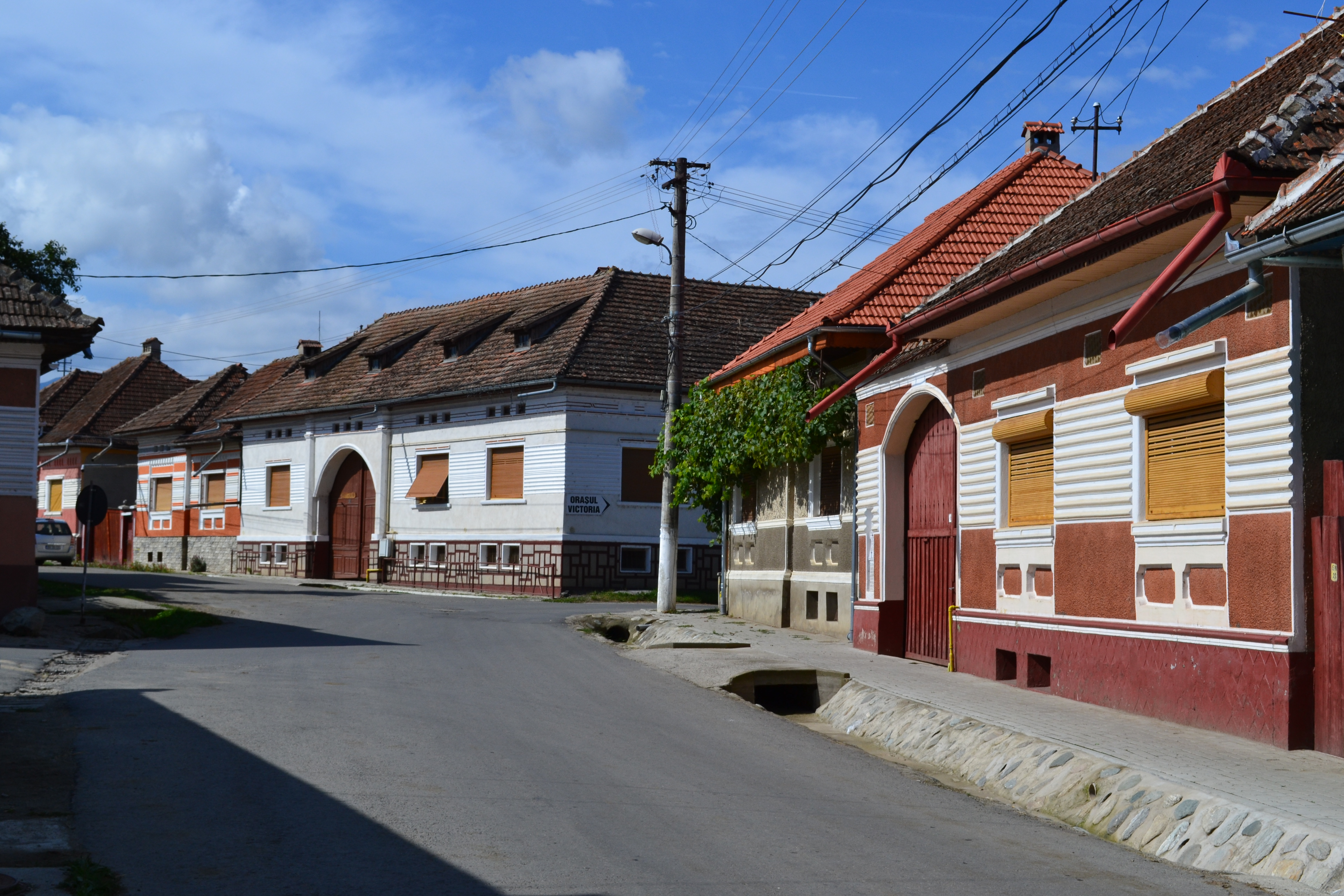

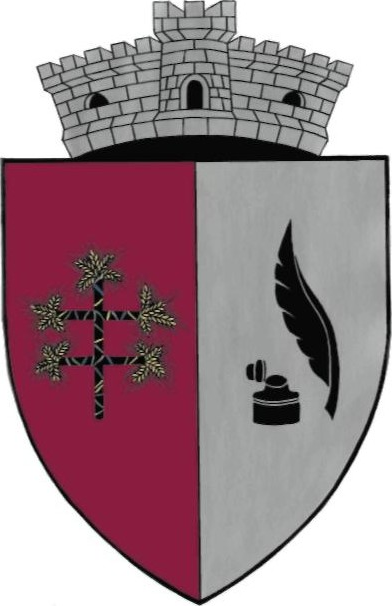
- Coat of arms

- Location in Romania
- Coordinates: 45°45′N 24°47′E
- Country: Romania
- County: Brașov

Government
  - Mayor (2024–2028): Tiberiu Ionuț Poparad (PSD)
- Area: 36.25 km^{2} (14.00 sq mi)
- Elevation: 485 m (1,591 ft)
- Population (2021-12-01): 971
  - Density: 26.8/km^{2} (69.4/sq mi)
- Time zone: UTC+02:00 (EET)
  - Summer (DST): UTC+03:00 (EEST)
- Postal code: 507251
- Area code: (+40) 02 68
- Vehicle reg.: BV
- Website: www.comunadragus.ro

Drăguș (German: Drachenbach, Traschen; Hungarian: Dragus) is a commune in Brașov County, Transylvania, Romania. It is composed of a single village, Drăguș, part of Viștea Commune until being split off in 2004.

Drăguș is located at the western edge of Brașov County, in the central part of the Țara Făgărașului region, at the foot of the Făgăraș Mountains. The river Drăguș flows north through the commune, discharging into the Olt River in Olteț.

Historical population
Year	Pop.	±%
1850	1,273	—
1977	1,567	+23.1%
2002	1,187	−24.3%
2011	1,162	−2.1%
2021	971	−16.4%
Source: Census data

At the 2011 census, the commune had 1,162 inhabitants; 99.8% were ethnic Romanians. At the 2021 census, the population had decreased to 971; of those, 93,72% were Romanians.

During the interwar period, ethnologist Dimitrie Gusti led a series of expeditions to various Romanian villages in which researchers from various fields would write monographs about particular aspects of those villages. The campaign reached its peak in Drăguș during the summer of 1929, when 89 researchers descended on the village. The event was recorded in a documentary film, Drăguș.

== Natives ==
- Ion Codru-Drăgușanu (1818 – 1884), prose writer
- Virgil Solomon (1894 – 1972), physician and politician
