= Viștea =

- Commune
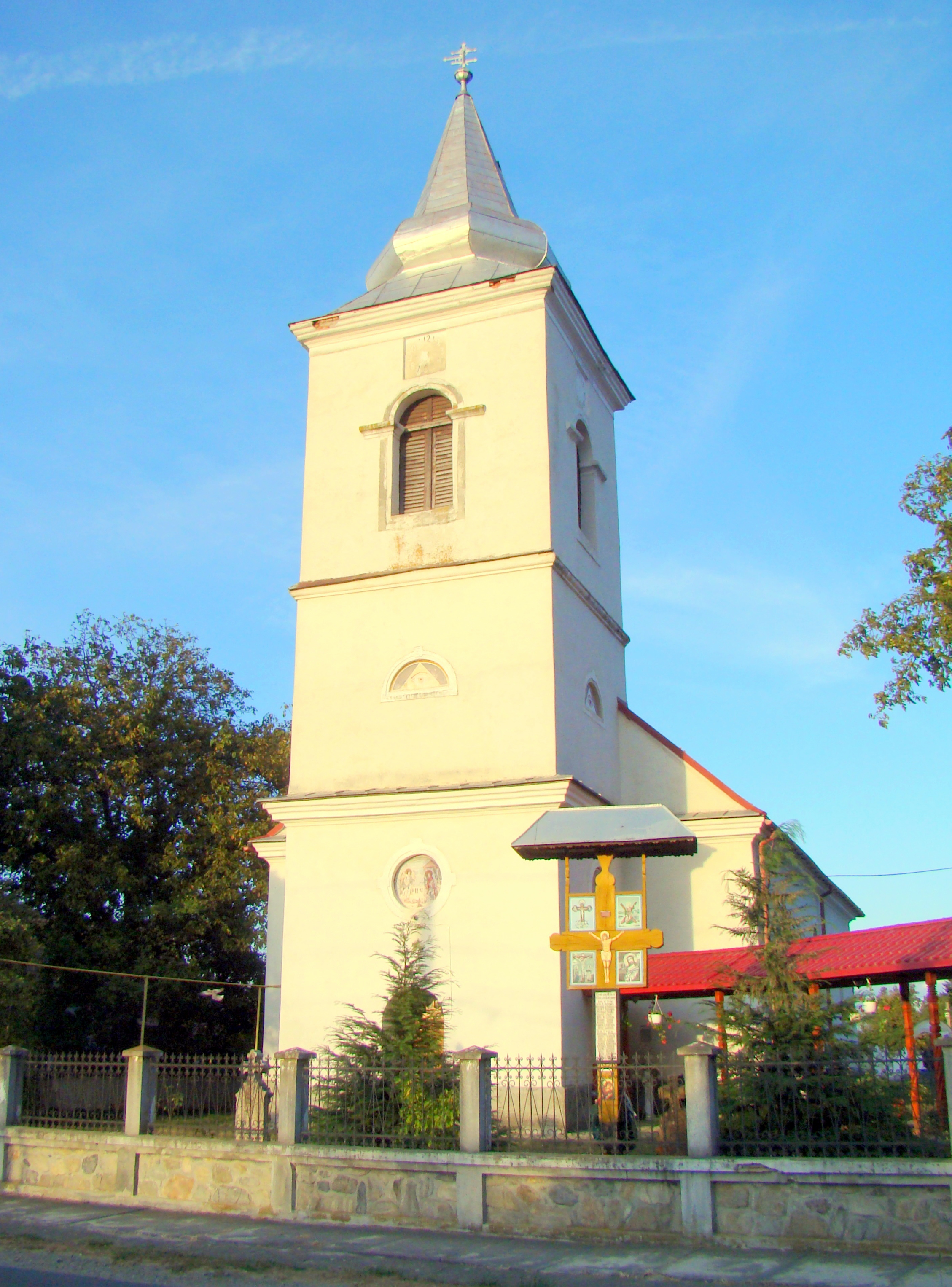
- Church in Viștea de Sus

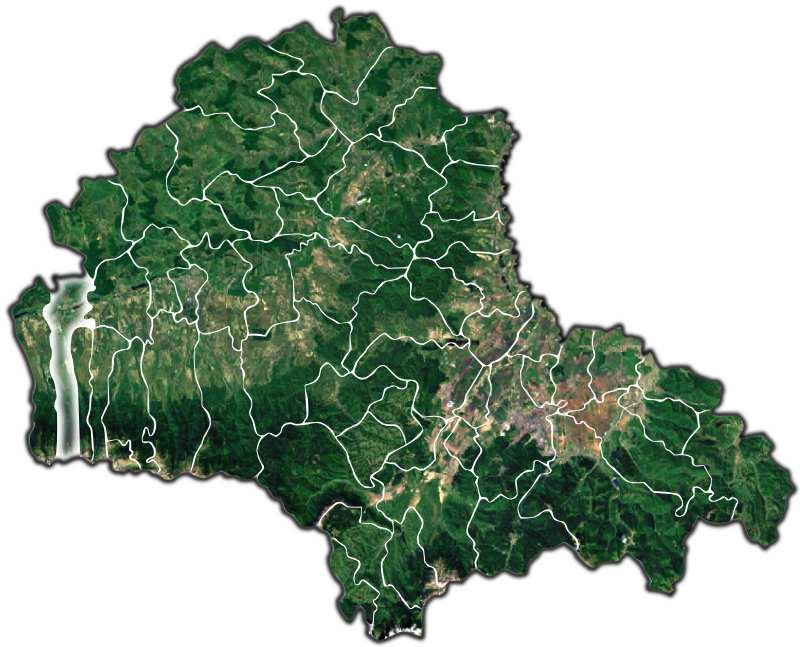
- Location within the county

- Location in Romania
- Coordinates: 45°49′15″N 24°46′14″E
- Country: Romania
- County: Brașov

Government
  - Mayor (2020–2024): Florin Ioani (PNL)
- Area: 83.89 km^{2} (32.39 sq mi)
- Elevation: 415 m (1,362 ft)
- Population (2021-12-01): 2,198
  - Density: 26.20/km^{2} (67.86/sq mi)
- Time zone: UTC+02:00 (EET)
  - Summer (DST): UTC+03:00 (EEST)
- Postal code: 507250
- Area code: +(40) 268
- Vehicle reg.: BV
- Website: comunavistea.ro

Viștea (Hungarian: Alsóvist) is a commune in Brașov County, Transylvania, Romania. It is composed of five villages: Olteț (Besimbák), Rucăr (German: Ruckersdorf; Rukkor), Viștea de Jos (the commune center), Viștea de Sus (Felsővist) and Viștișoara (Kisvist). It also included Drăguș village until 2004, when it was split off to form a separate commune.

== Geography ==
The commune is located at the western edge of Brașov County, in the central part of the Țara Făgărașului region, at the foot of the Făgăraș Mountains. The administrative center of the commune is in Viștea de Jos, situated on the DN1 road, 20 kilometres (12 mi) west of Făgăraș and 55 kilometres (34 mi) east of Sibiu.

Viștea is traversed east to west by the Olt River, which passes through the villages of Viștea de Jos, Olteț, and Rucăr. The Viștea River is formed by two tributaries, Viștea Mare and Viștișoara; it crosses the villages of Viștișoara and Viștea de Sus and discharges into the Olt in Viștea de Jos. The Viștea hydropower plant (14.2 MW) is located on the Olt; it produces electricity and regulates the course of the river.

== Demographics ==
Historical population
Year	Pop.	±%
2002	2,130	—
2011	2,026	−4.9%
2021	2,198	+8.5%
Source: Census data

At the 2011 census, the commune had 2,026 inhabitants, of which 87.8% were Romanians and 12% Roma. At the 2021 census, Viștea had a population of 2,198; of those, 69.34% were Romanians and 18.43% Roma.
