= List of rivers of Romania: B =

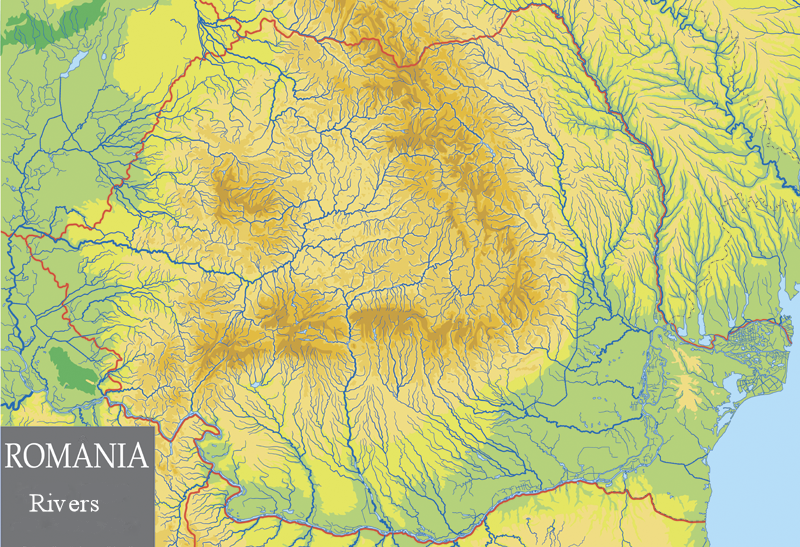
Map of Romania's hydrographic network

== B ==
**River**	**Tributary of**
Băbiu	Almaș
Baboia	Desnățui
Băcâia	Geoagiu
Băcăinți	Mureș
Băcin	Bega Veche
Băcișoara	Mureș
Baciu	Olt
Bacta	Mureș
Băgaciu	Târnava Mică
Bahlueț	Bahlui
Bahlui	Jijia
Bahna	Danube
Băi	Sabar
Baia	Tisza
Băiaș	Olt
Băiceni	Dresleuca
Baicu	Iza
Băița	Fleț
Băița	Lăpuș
Bălan	Râmnicul Sărat
Bălana	Ghighiu
Bălăneasa	Buzău
Bălăria	Neajlov
Balasan	Danube
Bălășița	Geamărtălui
Bâlca	Trotuș
Balcaia	Homorodul Vechi
Băldal	Desnățui
Baldovin	Crișul Alb
Bâleasa	Iza
Balomir	Jiul de Vest
Bâlta	Bistrița
Balta	Târnava Mică
Balta	Topolnița
Balta Dascălului	Olteț
Balu	Lotru
Ban	Crasna
Bandău	Someșul Mic
Băneasa	Chineja
Bănești	Argeș
Bănești	Crișul Alb
Bănia	Nera
Bănița	Jiul de Est
Baracu	Neajlov
Baranga	Colentina
Baraolt	Olt
Bărbat	Strei
Barboși	Elan
Barcău	Crișul Repede
Bârgău	Bistrița
Bârghiș	Hârtibaciu
Barheș	Caraș
Bârlad	Siret
Bârlădel	Siret
Bârlui	Olteț
Bârnărel	Bistrița
Bârnaru	Bistrița
Bârsa	Olt
Bârsa	Someș

**River**	**Tributary of**
Bârsa Fierului	Bârsa
Bârsa lui Bucur	Bârsa
Bârsănești	Tazlău
Bârsău	Someș
Bârz	Nera
Bărzăuța	Uz
Bârzava	Mureș
Bârzava	Timiș
Bârzăvița	Bârzava
Bașca	Uz
Bâsca	Buzău
Bâsca Chiojdului	Buzău
Bâsca Mică	Bâsca
Bascov	Argeș
Bâsculița	Bâsca
Băsești	Sălaj
Bașeu	Prut
Bătarci	Batar
Bătrâna	Râul Târgului
Bătrâna	Someșul Cald
Bătrâneanca	Stâmnic
Becaș	Someșul Mic
Beciul	Sărățel
Bega	Tisza
Bega Luncanilor	Bega
Bega Mică	Timișaț
Bega Poienilor	Bega
Bega Veche	Bega
Behela	Bega
Beica	Mureș
Beica	Oporelu Canal (Olt)
Beiușele	Nimăiești
Belareca	Cerna
Belcina	Mureș
Belciugatele	Mostiștea
Belinul Mare	Olt
Beliș	Someșul Cald
Beliu	Crișul Negru
Berchezoaia	Bârsău
Berheci	Bârlad
Berindești	Argeș
Berința	Cavnic
Berivoi	Racovița
Bertea	Aluniș
Berza	Danube
Berzasca	Danube
Beta	Olt
Beu	Nera
Beudiu	Apatiu
Bezerc	Jijia
Beznea	Crișul Repede
Bicăjel	Bicaz
Bicău	Someș
Bicaz	Bistrița
Bichigiu	Sălăuța
Biertan	Târnava Mare
Bilca Mare	Suceava
Biniș	Glavița
Birdanca	Bârzava

**River**	**Tributary of**
Bistra	Arieș
Bistra	Barcău
Bistra	Capra
Bistra	Mureș
Bistra	Sebeș
Bistra	Timiș
Bistra	Vișeu
Bistra Mărului	Bistra
Bistricioara	Bistrița (Olt)
Bistricioara	Bistrița (Siret)
Bistricioara	Bistrița (Tismana)
Bistrișoara	Arieș
Bistrița	Olt]
Bistrița	Șieu
Bistrița	Siret
Bistrița	Tismana
Bizdidel	Ialomița
Blahnița	Danube
Blahnița	Gilort
Blandiana	Mureș
Bloaja	Cavnic
Bobâlna	Mureș
Bobu	Olteț
Boca	Siret
Bodeasa	Bașeu
Bodești	Crișul Alb
Boga	Crișul Pietros
Bogata	Olt
Bogdana	Simila
Bogonos	Bahlui
Boholt	Mureș
Bohotin	Prut
Boia Mare	Olt
Boia Mică	Boia Mare
Boian	Inot
Bolătău	Bistrița
Bolați	Rebricea
Bold	Buzău
Bologa	Șes
Bolovan	Geamăna
Bolovăniș	Tarcău
Bolvașnița	Timiș
Bonda	Crișul Repede
Borăscu	Jilț
Borcut	Săsar
Borod	Crișul Repede
Borșa	Someșul Mic
Bortura	Someș
Borumlaca	Barcău
Borzontul Mare	Mureș
Borzontul Mic	Mureș
Boșneag	Danube
Boșorog	Râul Mare
Botfei	Beliu
Botiz	Lăpuș
Botiza	Iza
Boul	Tazlău
Bouleț	Cracăul Alb

**River**	**Tributary of**
Boz	Mureș
Boz	Secaș
Bozani	Cârpeștii Mici
Bozed	Lechința
Bozieni	Bârlad
Bozolnic	Almaș
Brabova	Merețel
Brad	Crișul Alb
Brad	Suciu
Brădești	Jiu
Brădești	Târnava Mare
Brâglez	Someș
Braia	Jiul de Vest
Bratcov	Vedea
Bratcu	Jiu
Brătcuța	Crișul Repede
Brătei	Ialomița
Brateș	Tarcău
Bratia	Râul Târgului
Bratilov	Milcovăț
Bratoșa	Someșul Mare
Breaza	Olt
Breazova	Râul Galben
Brebina	Motru
Breboaia	Mara
Brebu	Bâsca Mică
Brețcu	Râul Negru
Briheni	Crișul Negru
Brodina	Suceava
Bucerdea	Ighiu
Bucieș	Cașin
Buciumi	Cașin
Bucovel	Teleajen
Bucureșci	Crișul Alb
Buda	Argeș
Budac	Șieu
Budeasa	Râul Doamnei
Budele	Olteț
Budieru	Crișul Alb
Budișteanca	Argeș
Budușel	Budac
Bughea	Râul Târgului
Bughea	Teleajen
Buhai	Jijia
Buhalnița	Bahlui
Buhui	Caraș
Bujorul	Chineja
Bunea	Bega
Bunila	Cerna
Burdea	Vedea
Burla	Sitna
Busniac	Târnava Mare
Buta	Jiul de Vest
Buzăiel	Buzău
Buzat	Desnățui
Buzău	Siret
Buzoel	Buzău
