= Mureș (river) =

River in Eastern Europe

Mureș/Maros
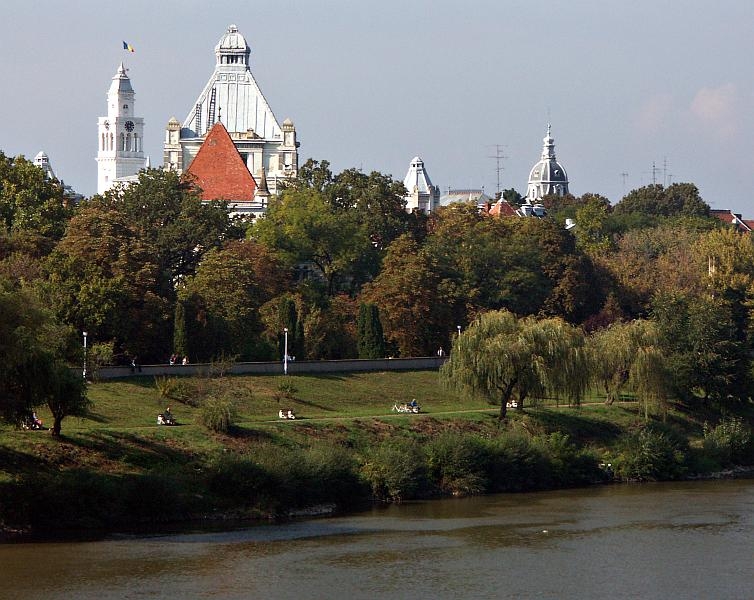
- The Mureș in Arad

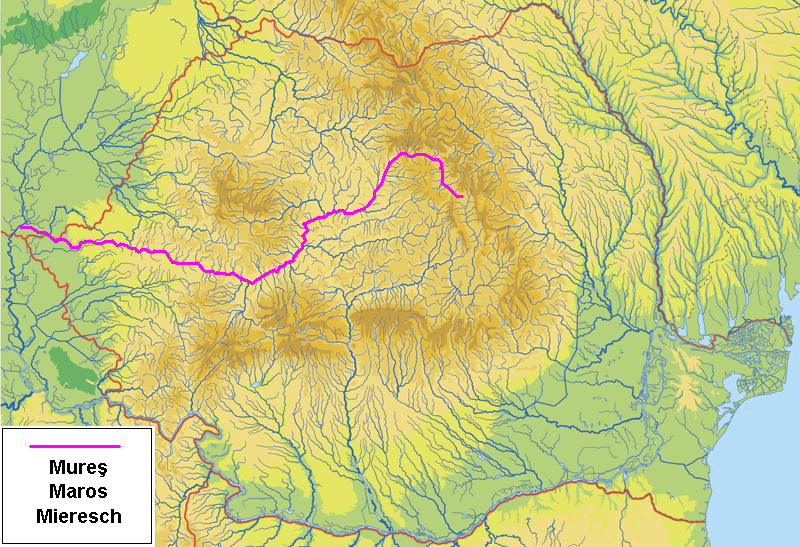

Location
- Countries: Romania and Hungary
- Cities: Târgu Mureș; Alba Iulia; Deva; Arad; Szeged

Physical characteristics
- Source: Carpathian Mountains
  - location: Izvorul Mureșului, Harghita County, Romania
  - coordinates: 46°36′55″N 25°37′2″E
  - elevation: 850 m (2,790 ft)
- Mouth: Tisza
  - location: Szeged, Csongrád County, Hungary
  - coordinates: 46°15′6″N 20°11′39″E
  - elevation: 75 m (246 ft)
- Length: 789 km (490 mi)
- Basin size: 30,332 km^{2} (11,711 mi^{2}) 30,190.1 km^{2} (11,656.5 mi^{2})
- Discharge
  - location: Makó
  - average: 184 m^{3}/s (6,500 cu ft/s)
- Discharge
  - location: Szeged (near mouth)
  - average: 188.895 m^{3}/s (6,670.8 cu ft/s)

Basin features
- Progression: Tisza→ Danube→ Black Sea
- Tributaries
  - left: Târnava, Sebeș, Strei
  - right: Arieș

The Mureș (Romanian: [ˈmureʃ]) or Maros (Hungarian: [ˈmɒroʃ]; German: Mieresch, Serbian: Мориш / Moriš) is a 789-kilometre-long (490 mi) river in Eastern Europe. Its drainage basin covers an area of 30,332 km^{2} (11,711 sq mi). It originates in the Hășmașu Mare Range in the Eastern Carpathian Mountains, Romania, rising close to the headwaters of the river Olt, and joins the Tisza at Szeged in southeastern Hungary. In Romania, its length is 761 km (473 mi) and its basin size is 27,890 km^{2} (10,770 sq mi).

The Mureș River flows through the Romanian counties Harghita, Mureș, Alba, Hunedoara, Arad and Timiș, and the Hungarian county Csongrád. The largest cities on the Mureș/Maros are Târgu Mureș, Alba Iulia, Deva and Arad in Romania as well as Makó and Szeged in Hungary.

The Hungarian reaches of the Mureș/Maros are 73 km (45 mi) long as the state border. Some 28.5 km^{2} (11.0 sq mi) on the northern side of the river are protected as part of the Körös-Maros National Park. The Maros Floodplain Protected Area consists of gallery forests, floodplain meadows and 0.6 km^{2} (0.23 sq mi) of forest reserve near Szeged.

Salt used to be traded in medieval times on the river on large rafts.

== Name ==
The river is known to be first mentioned by Herodotus in 485 BC bearing the name Maris (Μάρις). Strabo calls it Marisos (Μάρισος). It was known in Latin as the Marisus; the Mureș is also mentioned, as Morisis (Μορήσης), in a document of the Byzantine Emperor Constantine VII, in 948 AD.

It was also known in German variously as the Mieresch, Marosch or Muresch, owing to Transylvanian Saxon settlements and prior Habsburg rule. It was known in Turkish as the Maroş or Muriş under the Ottomans.

== History ==
Since ancient times, the Mureș River has been a heavily used waterway for both commercial traffic and strategic purposes, becoming a veritable highway for the area north of the Danube.

Ever since the Dacian-Roman wars, control of the Mureș River has been one of the key military maneuvers that the Roman army sought to achieve in order to gain an advantage over the defensive system of the Dacian Kingdom.

Thus, during the military operations at the beginning of Trajan's Second Dacian War, it is assumed that the vexillatio formed by the troops of Pannonia Inferior, led by Aelius Hadrianus (who would later become Emperor Hadrian), then governor of Pannonia, advanced deep into the heart of Dacia via the Mureș Valley, probably using the river fleet — the Classis Flavia Pannonica — as well. The existence of a collegium nautarum in Apulum is an indication that those involved in water transport in Roman times were quite numerous. All raw materials: gold, iron, salt, wood, were exported to Rome and other western provinces by water. The lack of salt in the neighboring Roman provinces (the two Pannoniae and the two Moesiae) is a good argument to explain the regularity of this massive export on the Mureș River.This fact, together with the high density of civilian habitation (through the two cities) and the presence of the legion and the governor of Dacia at Apulum, makes this the most important civilian river port in Roman Dacia. In fact, this is where the Mureș river highway (which connected Partiscum with the road from Lugio) intersected with the main imperial road of the province of Dacia, which crossed the most important cities north of the Danube: Dierna - Tibiscum - Ulpia Traiana - Apulum - Potaissa - Napoca - Porolissum.

== Towns and villages ==
The following towns are situated along the river Mureș, from source to mouth: Toplița, Reghin, Târgu Mureș, Luduș, Ocna Mureș, Aiud, Teiuș, Alba Iulia, Geoagiu, Orăștie, Simeria, Deva, Lipova, Arad, Nădlac (all in Romania), Makó, Szeged (both in Hungary).

The Mureș flows through the following communes (grouped by counties, from source to mouth):

- Harghita County: Voșlăbeni, Suseni, Joseni, Remetea, Subcetate, Sărmaș, Gălăuțaș, Toplița
- Mureș County: Stânceni, Lunca Bradului, Răstolița, Deda, Rușii-Munți, Aluniș, Brâncovenești, Ideciu de Jos, Suseni, Reghin, Petelea, Gornești, Glodeni, Ernei, Sântana de Mureș, Sângeorgiu de Mureș, Târgu Mureș, Sâncraiu de Mureș, Cristești, Pănet, Ungheni, Sânpaul, Iernut, Cuci, Bogata, Luduș, Chețani
- Alba County: Noșlac, Lunca Mureșului, Ocna Mureș, Unirea, Mirăslău, Aiud, Rădești, Teiuș, Sântimbru, Ciugud, Alba Iulia, Vințu de Jos, Blandiana, Săliștea, Șibot
- Hunedoara County: Geoagiu, Orăștie, Turdaș, Rapoltu Mare, Simeria, Hărău, Deva, Șoimuș, Vețel, Brănișca, Ilia, Gurasada, Dobra, Burjuc, Zam
- Arad County: Petriș, Săvârșin, Birchiș, Vărădia de Mureș, Bata, Bârzava, Conop, Ususău, Lipova, Păuliș, Frumușeni, Fântânele, Vladimirescu, Arad, Zădăreni, Felnac, Pecica, Secusigiu, Semlac, Șeitin, Nădlac
- Timiș County: Periam, Sânpetru Mare, Sânnicolau Mare, Cenad
- Csongrád County: Nagylak, Magyarcsanád, Apátfalva, Makó, Kiszombor, Ferencszállás, Maroslele, Klárafalva, Deszk, Szeged

== Tributaries ==
The following rivers are tributaries to the river Mureș (from source to mouth):

Left: Cărbunele Negru, Senetea, Fierăstrăul, Șumuleul Mare, Borzontul Mare, Borzontul Mic, Pietrosul, Bacta, Limbuș, Piatra, Eseniu, Martonca, Calnaci, Muscă, Gălăuțaș, Zăpodea, Măgheruș, Mărșinețul de Sus, Gudea Mare, Sălard, Iod, Borzia, Sebeș, Fițcău, Idicel, Deleni, Gurghiu, Mocear, Beica, Habic, Petrilaca, Valea cu Nuci, Terebici, Pocloș, Budiu, Niraj, Pârâul Mare, Lăscud, Sărata, Șeulia, Valea Luncilor, Ațintiș, Găbud, Fărău, Ciunga, Pusta Băgăului, Rât, Târnava, Hăpria, Sebeș, Pianul, Cioara, Cugir, Vaidei, Romos, Orăștie, Turdaș, Strei, Tâmpa, Cerna, Herepeia, Căoi, Vulcez, Leșnic, Săcămaș, Plai, Dobra, Abucea, Valea Mare, Sălciva, Peștiș, Căpriorișca, Somonița, Birchiș, Izvor, Corbul, Fiac, Suliniș, Lalașinț, Chelmac, Pârâul Mare, Șiștarovăț, Țârnobara, Sinicoț, Valea Fânețelor de Jos, Zădărlac, and Zădăreni

Right: Chindeni, Arinul Scurt, Chirtoegher, Strâmba, Pârâul Noroios, Belcina, Lăzarea, Ghiduț, Ditrău, Faier, Jolotca, Filipea, Sărmaș, Ciucic, Toplița, Călimănel, Mermezeu, Zebrac, Neagra, Ilva, Obcina Ferigelor (Fântânel), Răstolița, Gălăoaia, Bistra, Pietriș, Dumbrava, Râpa, Agriș, Lueriu, Luț, Șar, Voiniceni, Cuieșd, Valea Fânațelor, Șăușa, Valea din Jos, Lechința, Ranta, Pârâul de Câmpie, Grindeni, Arieș, Unirea, Ciugud, Ormeniș, Mirăslău, Lopadea, Aiud, Gârbova, Geoagiu (Alba), Galda, Ampoi, Pâclișa, Valea Vințului, Blandiana, Stânișoara, Băcăinți, Homorod, Geoagiu (Hunedoara), Boiul, Bobâlna, Valea lui Sânpetru, Lazu, Vărmaga, Certej, Boholt, Căian, Bejan, Boz, Sârbi, Băcișoara, Gurasada, Zam, Almaș, Petriș, Crăciuneasca, Troaș, Vinești, Stejar, Julița, Valea Mare, Grosul, Monoroștia, Bârzava, Nadăș, Conop, Cornic, Milova, Jernova, Șoimoș, Radna, Cladova, Crac, and Száraz-ér

== Images ==
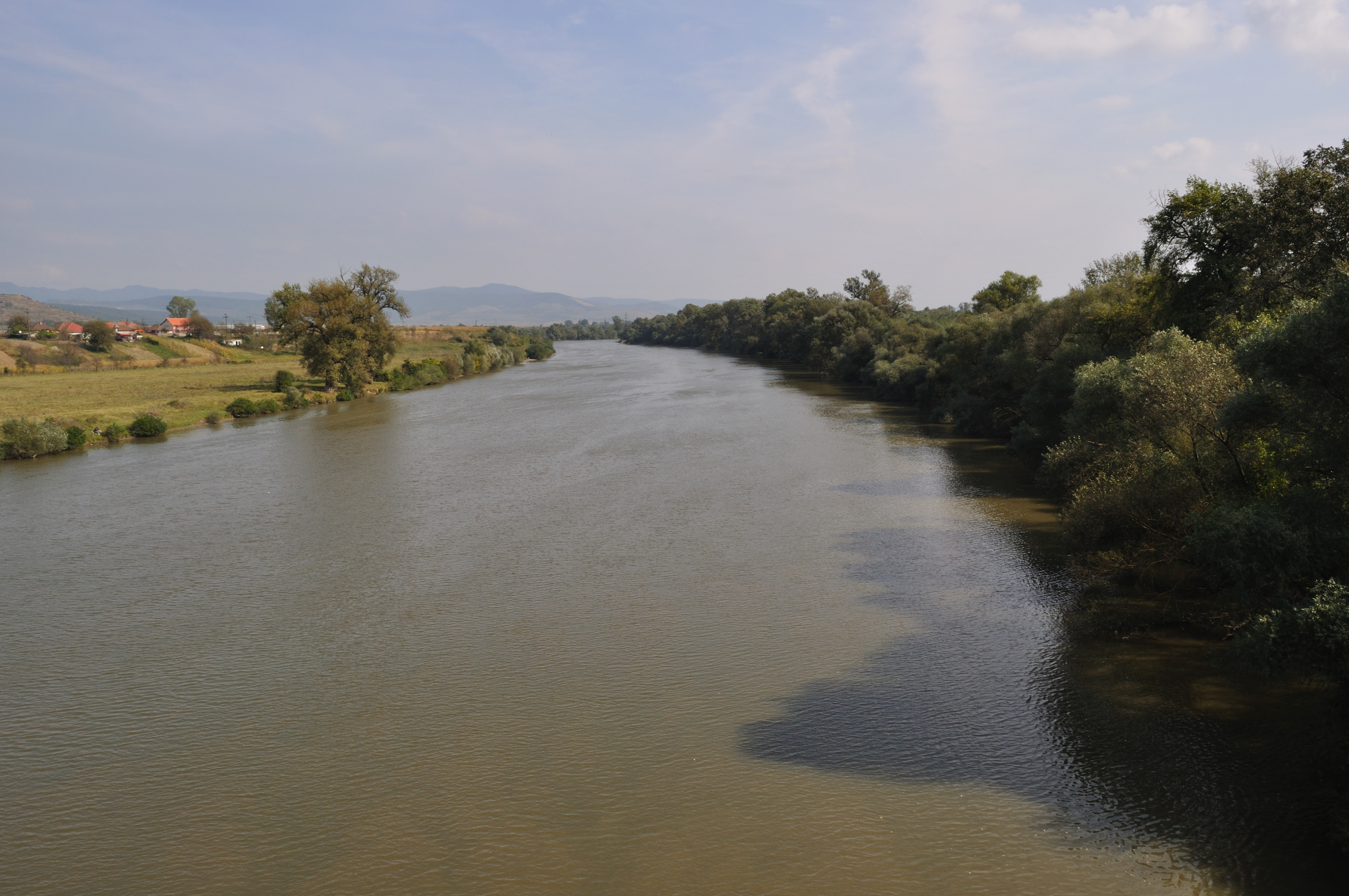
Mureș (Maros) river near Șoimuș, Romania

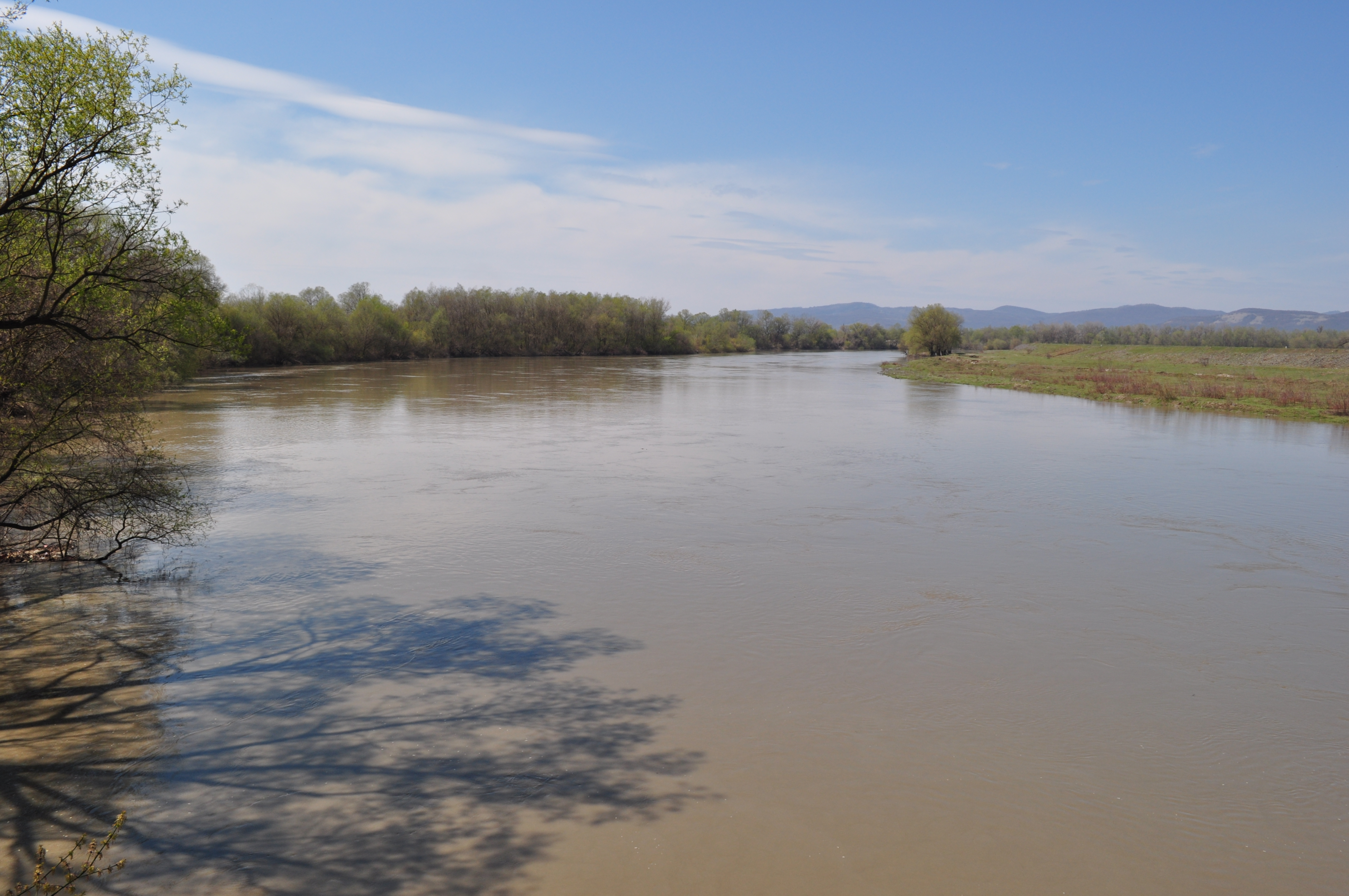
Mureș river near Ilia, Romania

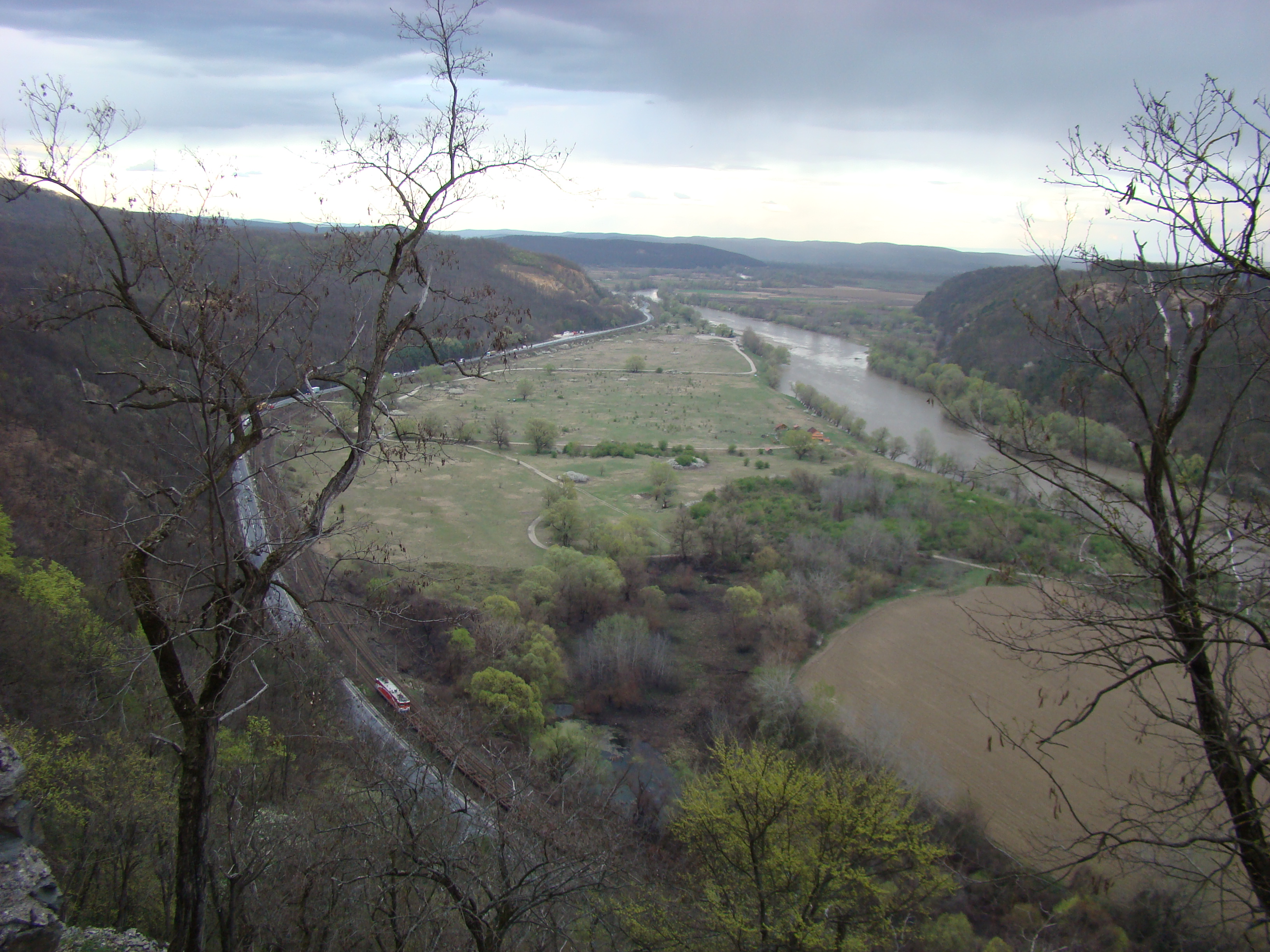
Mureș river near Lipova, Romania

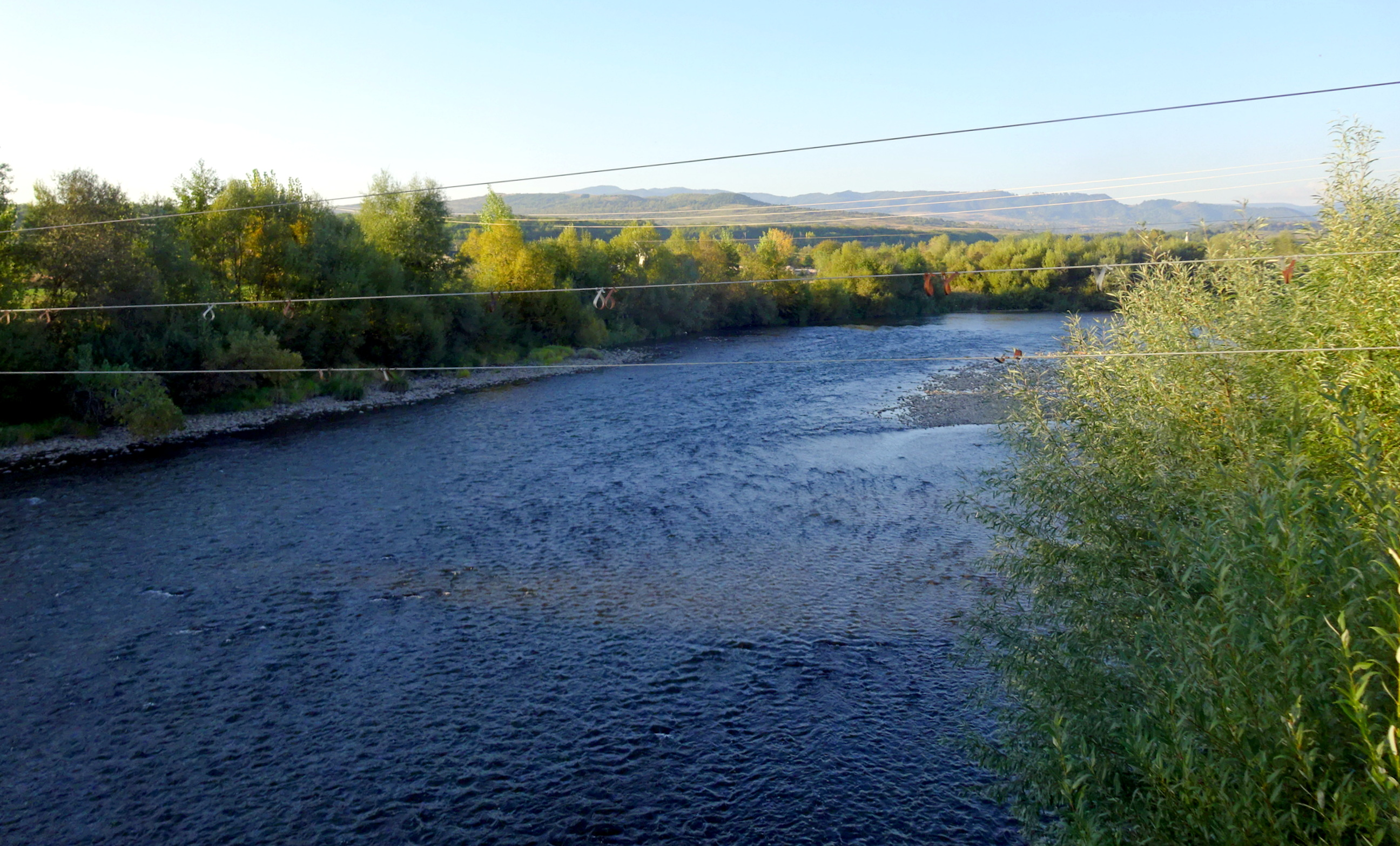
Mureș River in its upper course at Rușii-Munți, Mureș County, Romania

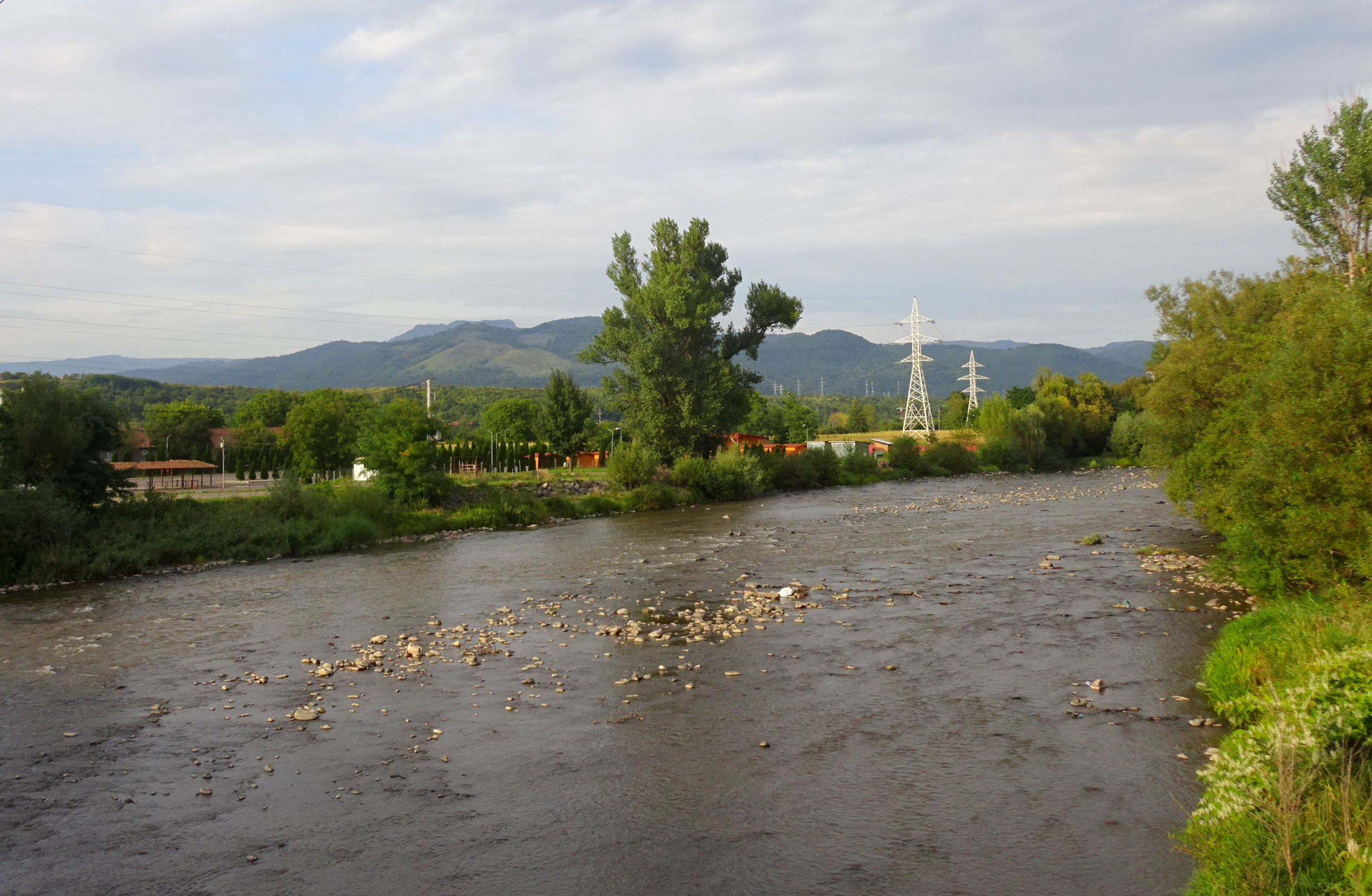
Mureș River in Filea, Mureș County, Romania

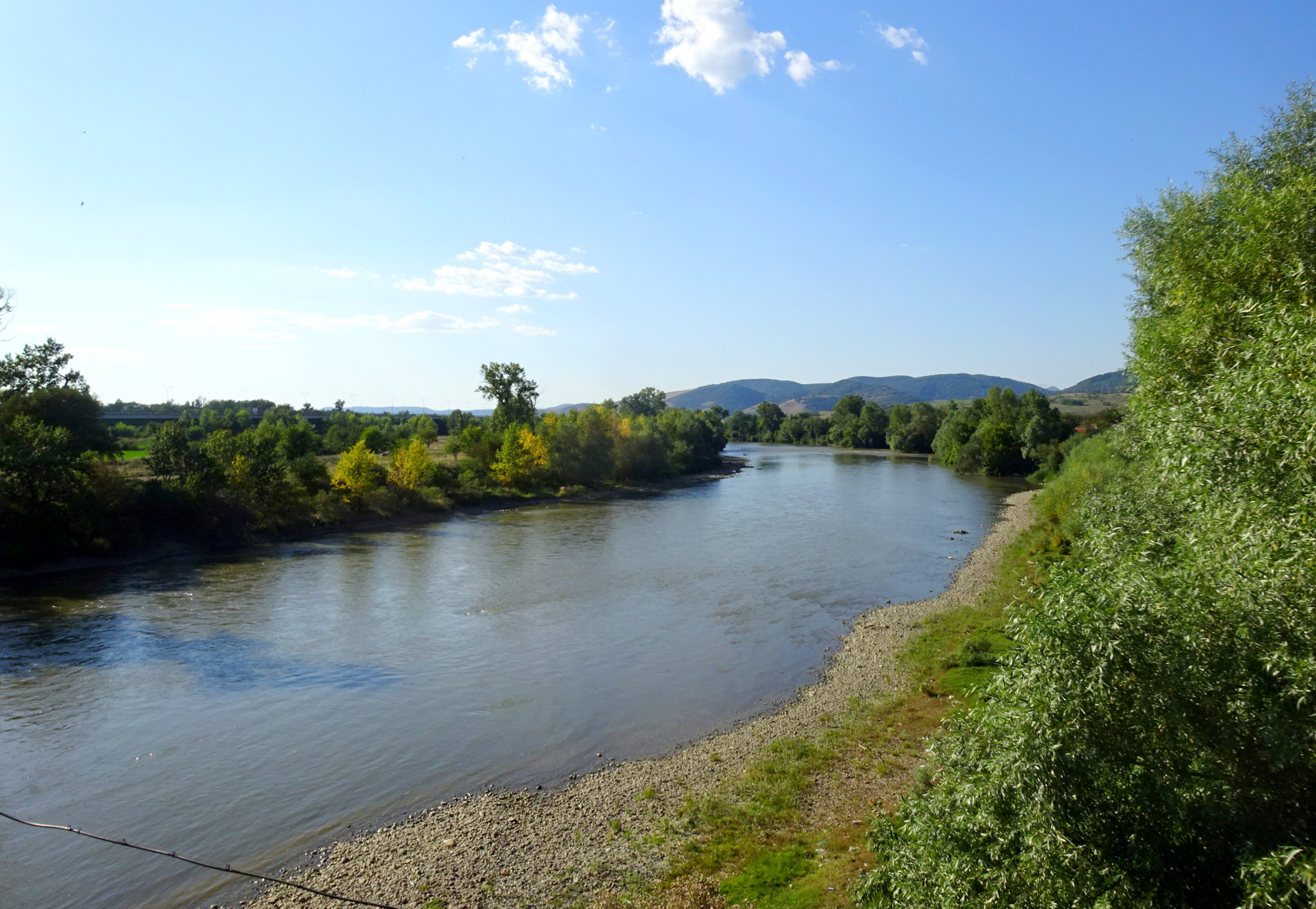
Mureș River at Simeria, Romania

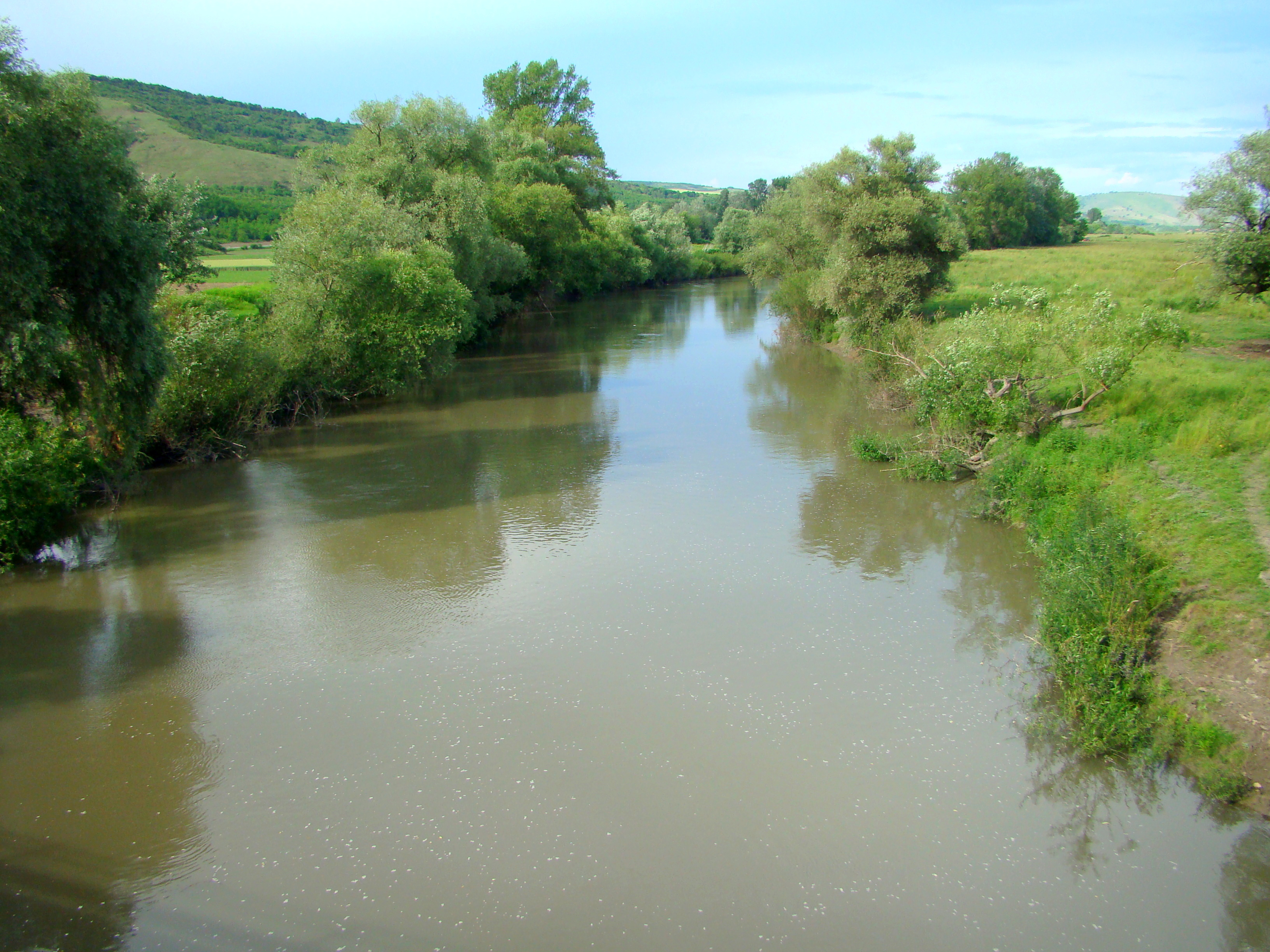
Mureș River at Sânpaul, Romania

== See also ==
- List of rivers of Romania
- List of rivers of Europe
