= Julita =

Julita may refer to:

- Julita, Leyte, municipality in the province of Leyte, Philippines
- Julița, a village in Vărădia de Mureș Commune, Arad County, Romania
- Julița, a tributary of the Mureș in Arad County, Romania
- Julita parish in the county of Södermanland, Sweden, site of Julita manor
  - Julita Abbey (former)
- Saint Julitta or Julietta
