= Boian =

Boian may refer to:

- Boian, a village in Ceanu Mare Commune, Cluj County, Romania
- Boian, a village in Bazna Commune, Sibiu County, Romania
- Boianu Mare, a commune in Bihor County, Romania
- Boian (river), a river in Bihor County, Romania
- Boiany (Romanian: Boian), a village in Chernivtsi Oblast, Ukraine
- Boian, Alberta, a mostly ethnic Romanian hamlet in Canada
- Boian culture, an archaeological culture
