= Cuieșd =

Cuieșd may refer to:

- Cuieșd, a village in Brusturi Commune, Bihor County, Romania
- Cuieșd, a village in Pănet Commune, Mureș County, Romania
- Cuieșd (river), a tributary of the river Mureș in Transylvania, Romania
