= Bârzava =

Bârzava can refer to the following places in Romania:

- Bârzava (Timiș), a tributary of the Timiș
- Bârzava (Mureș), a tributary of the Mureș
- Bârzava, Arad, a commune in Arad County
- Bârzava, a village in Frumoasa commune, Harghita County

== See also ==
- Bârzăvița River (disambiguation)
