= Sebeș (disambiguation) =

Sebeș is a city in Alba County, Romania.

Sebes or variants may also refer to:

== People ==
- Sebes (margrave) (d. 1039), Hungarian nobleman
- Gusztáv Sebes (1906–1986), Hungarian footballer and coach

== Romania ==
=== Settlements ===
- Sebeș (Hungarian: Sebes), a village in Hârseni Commune, Brașov County
- Sebeș, a village in Rușii-Munți Commune, Mureș County

=== Streams ===
- Sebeș (river), a river in Alba and Sibiu Counties, tributary of the Mureș
- Sebeș (Cibin), a small river in Sibiu County, tributary of the Cibin
- Sebeș (Drăgan), a small river in Bihor and Cluj Counties, tributary of the Drăgan
- Sebeș, a small river in Mureș County, tributary of the Gurghiu
- Sebeș (Mureș), a small river in Mureș County, tributary of the Mureș
- Sebeș (Brașov), a small river in Brașov County, tributary of the Olt
- Sebeș (Sibiu), a small river in Sibiu County, tributary of the Olt
- Sebeș (Timiș), a small river in Caraș-Severin County, tributary of the Timiș
- Sebeș (Sovata), a small river in Mureș County, tributary of the Sovata

== Serbia ==
- Sebeš, a river, bog and a suburb of Belgrade

== See also ==
- Sebeșu (disambiguation)
- Sibișel (disambiguation)
