= Osoiu River (disambiguation) =

Osoiu River is a right tributary of the river Holod in Romania.

Osoiu River may also refer to:

- Oșoiu River (Bistrița), Suceava County, Romania
- Oșoiu River (Grosul), Arad County, Romania
