= Inot =

River in Romania

- Location within Romania

Location
- Country: Romania
- Counties: Bihor County
- Villages: Păgaia, Viișoara, Marghita

Physical characteristics
- Mouth: Barcău
  - location: Marghita
  - coordinates: 47.3393°N 22.3329°E
- Length: 22 km (14 mi)
- Basin size: 124 km^{2} (48 sq mi)

Basin features
- Progression: Barcău→ Crișul Repede→ Körös→ Tisza→ Danube→ Black Sea
- Tributaries
  - left: Boian
  - right: Pățălușa

The Inot is a right tributary of the river Barcău in Romania. It discharges into the Barcău in Marghita. Its length is 22 km (14 mi) and its basin size is 124 km^{2} (48 sq mi).
