= Baresd =

Baresd is the Hungarian name for two villages in Romania:

- Bărăştii Iliei village, Brănișca Commune, Hunedoara County
- Bărăştii Haţegului village, Sântămăria-Orlea Commune, Hunedoara County
