= Blandiana =

- Commune
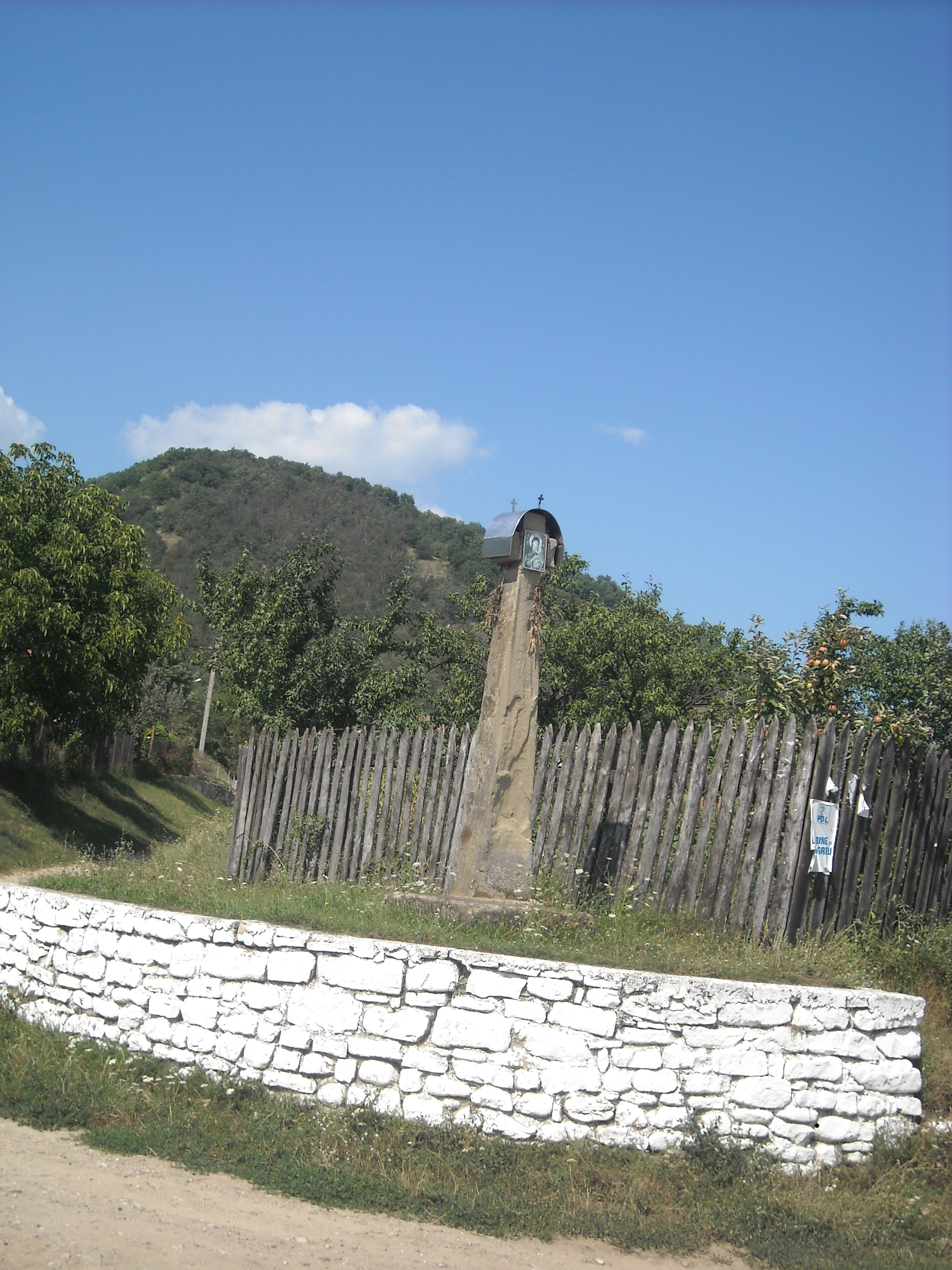
- Crucifix by the road in Blandiana village

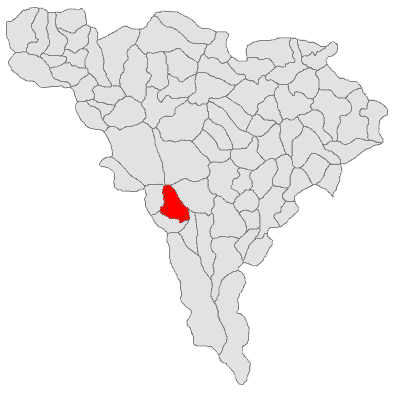
- Location in Alba County

- Location in Romania
- Coordinates: 45°58′N 23°23′E
- Country: Romania
- County: Alba

Government
  - Mayor (2020–2024): Nicolae Gherman (PNL)
- Area: 73.36 km^{2} (28.32 sq mi)
- Elevation: 229 m (751 ft)
- Population (2021-12-01): 818
  - Density: 11.2/km^{2} (28.9/sq mi)
- Time zone: UTC+02:00 (EET)
  - Summer (DST): UTC+03:00 (EEST)
- Postal code: 517160
- Area code: (+40) 02 58
- Vehicle reg.: AB
- Website: comuna-blandiana.ro

Blandiana (German: Stumpach; Hungarian: Maroskarna) is a commune located in Alba County, Transylvania, Romania. It has a population of 818 (as of 2021) and is composed of five villages: Acmariu (Akmár), Blandiana, Ibru, Poieni, and Răcătău (Rakató).

The commune lies on the right bank of the river Mureș and its tributary, the river Blandiana. It is located in the southwestern part of Alba County, on the southern edge of the Metaliferi Mountains, part of the Apuseni Mountains. The nearest town, Sebeș, is about 13 km (8.1 mi) to the east, while the county seat, Alba Iulia, is 24 km (15 mi) to the northeast.

Blandiana borders the following localities: Meteș and Zlatna to the north, Vințu de Jos to the east, Săliștea to the southeast, Șibot to the south, and Ceru-Băcăinți to the west.

The Blandiana railway station serves the CFR Line 200, that runs from Brașov to the Hungarian border at Curtici.

== Attractions ==
- Wooden church (1768, renovated in the 19th century) in Acmariu village.
- Piatra Tomii Nature Reserve.
- The Romanian Orthodox Church of the Holy Archangels, replacing a wooden church built in 1890. The new church is different from others because of the wooden bell tower. The relatively low nave with a semicircular wooden ceiling extends over the apse.

Historical population
Year	Pop.	±%
1850	1,875	—
1900	2,587	+38.0%
1930	2,463	−4.8%
2002	1,187	−51.8%
2011	923	−22.2%
2021	818	−11.4%
Source: INS, Census data

== Cultural references ==
Poet Ana Blandiana (born 1942) took her name after the commune, which is located near Vințu de Jos, her mother's home village.
