= Bolovănești =

Bolovăneşti may refer to several villages in Romania:

- Bolovăneşti, a village in Ceru-Băcăinți Commune, Alba County
- Bolovăneşti, a village in Mușătești Commune, Argeș County
