= Pietrosul =

Pietrosul Köves-Somlyó
- Location within Romania

Location
- Country: Romania
- Counties: Harghita County

Physical characteristics
- Source: Harghita Mountains
- Mouth: Mureș
  - coordinates: 46.7315°N 25.4385°E
- Length: 13 km (8.1 mi)
- Basin size: 40 km^{2} (15 sq mi)

Basin features
- Progression: Mureș→ Tisza→ Danube→ Black Sea

The Pietrosul (Hungarian: Köves-Somlyó or Köves-Somlyó-patak; Hungarian pronunciation: [ˈkøvɛʃʃomjoː]) is a left tributary of the Mureș in Romania. It flows into the Mureș between Joseni and Remetea. Its length is 13 km (8.1 mi) and its basin size is 40 km^{2} (15 sq mi).
