= Morăreni =

Morăreni may refer to several villages in Romania:

- Morăreni, a village in Lupeni Commune, Harghita County
- Morăreni, a village in Rușii-Munți Commune, Mureș County
- Morăreni, a village in Alexandru Vlahuţă Commune, Vaslui County
