= Mogoș River =

Mogoș or Mogoșu may refer to one of the following rivers of Romania:

- Mogoșu, a tributary of the Lotrioara in Sibiu County
- Mogoșu, a tributary of the Teleajen in Prahova County
- Mogoș Biuc, a tributary of the Belcina in Harghita County
