= Jolotca =

Jolotca Orotva-patak
- Location within Romania

Location
- Country: Romania
- Counties: Harghita County
- Villages: Jolotca

Physical characteristics
- Mouth: Mureș
  - location: Hodoșa
  - coordinates: 46.8709°N 25.4415°E
- Length: 15 km (9.3 mi)
- Basin size: 54 km^{2} (21 sq mi)

Basin features
- Progression: Mureș→ Tisza→ Danube→ Black Sea
- Tributaries
  - right: Turcu, Holoșag

The Jolotca (Hungarian: Orotva-patak) is a right tributary of the river Mureș in Transylvania, Romania. It discharges into the Mureș in Hodoșa. Its length is 15 km (9.3 mi) and its basin size is 54 km^{2} (21 sq mi).
