= Stejar (river) =

Stejar Szarvaság
- Location within Romania

Location
- Country: Romania
- Counties: Arad County
- Villages: Stejar

Physical characteristics
- Mouth: Mureș
  - location: Stejar
  - coordinates: 46.0120°N 22.1302°E
- Length: 16 km (9.9 mi)
- Basin size: 45 km^{2} (17 sq mi)

Basin features
- Progression: Mureș→ Tisza→ Danube→ Black Sea
- Tributaries
  - left: Lupești

The Stejar (Hungarian: Szarvaság) is a right tributary of the river Mureș in Romania. It discharges into the Mureș in Stejar. Its length is 16 km (9.9 mi) and its basin size is 45 km^{2} (17 sq mi). Its name means Oak tree in Romanian and "Deer Branch" in Hungarian.
