= Vinc =

Vinc may refer to:

- Matt Vinc (born 1982), Canadian lacrosse player
- Vinc, Turkish for Cranes

== See also ==
- Vinț River (Hungarian: Vinc-patak), a river in Romania
