= Gurasada mine =

Bentonite mine in Hunedoara County, Romania

- Location: Gurasada, Hunedoara County, Romania
- Products: Bentonite

The Gurasada mine is a large mine in the west of Romania in Hunedoara County, 28 km north-west of Deva and 409 km northwest of the capital, Bucharest. Gurasada represents one of the largest bentonite reserve in Romania having estimated reserves of 20 million tonnes.
