= Borzontul Mare =

Borzontul Mare Borzont, Putna
- Location within Romania

Location
- Country: Romania
- Counties: Harghita County
- Villages: Borzont

Physical characteristics
- Source
  - location: Gurghiu Mountains
- Mouth: Mureș
  - coordinates: 46.7164°N 25.4610°E
- Length: 15 km (9.3 mi)
- Basin size: 46 km^{2} (18 sq mi)

Basin features
- Progression: Mureș→ Tisza→ Danube→ Black Sea

The Borzontul Mare (sometimes referred to as Borzont) is a left tributary of the river Mureș in Romania. It discharges into the Mureș near Joseni. The upper reach of the river is also known as Putna. Its length is 15 km (9.3 mi) and its basin size is 46 km^{2} (18 sq mi).
