= Bacta (river) =

Bacta Bakta-patak
- Location within Romania

Location
- Country: Romania
- Counties: Harghita County

Physical characteristics
- Source: Gurghiu Mountains
- Mouth: Mureș
  - coordinates: 46.7421°N 25.4412°E
- Length: 11 km (6.8 mi)
- Basin size: 39 km^{2} (15 sq mi)

Basin features
- Progression: Mureș→ Tisza→ Danube→ Black Sea

The Bacta ( Hungarian: Bakta-patak ) is a left tributary of the river Mureș in Transylvania, Romania. It discharges into the Mureș near Joseni. Its length is 11 km (6.8 mi) and its basin size is 39 km^{2} (15 sq mi).
