= Borzontul Mic =

River in Romania

- Location within Romania

Location
- Country: Romania
- Counties: Harghita County

Physical characteristics
- Source: Bucin Pass
  - location: Gurghiu Mountains
- Mouth: Mureș
  - coordinates: 46.7245°N 25.4461°E
- Length: 14 km (8.7 mi)
- Basin size: 34 km^{2} (13 sq mi)

Basin features
- Progression: Mureș→ Tisza→ Danube→ Black Sea

The Borzontul Mic (Hungarian: Kis-Borzont-patak) is a left tributary of the river Mureș in Transylvania, Romania. It discharges into the Mureș near Joseni. Its length is 14 km (8.7 mi) and its basin size is 34 km^{2} (13 sq mi).
