= Cuieșd (river) =

Cuieșd Mezőkövesdi-patak
- Location within Romania

Location
- Country: Romania
- Counties: Mureș County
- Villages: Cuieșd, Hărțău, Pănet

Physical characteristics
- Mouth: Mureș
  - coordinates: 46.5121°N 24.4726°E
- Length: 13 km (8.1 mi)
- Basin size: 56 km^{2} (22 sq mi)

Basin features
- Progression: Mureș→ Tisza→ Danube→ Black Sea
- Tributaries
  - right: Berghia

The Cuieșd (Hungarian: Mezőkövesdi-patak) is a right tributary of the river Mureș in Transylvania, Romania. It discharges into the Mureș in Cristești. Its length is 13 km (8.1 mi) and its basin size is 56 km^{2} (22 sq mi). Its name originates from the Hungarian “kő” for “stone”, so its name means “Stony Creek”.
