= Sebeș (Mureș) =

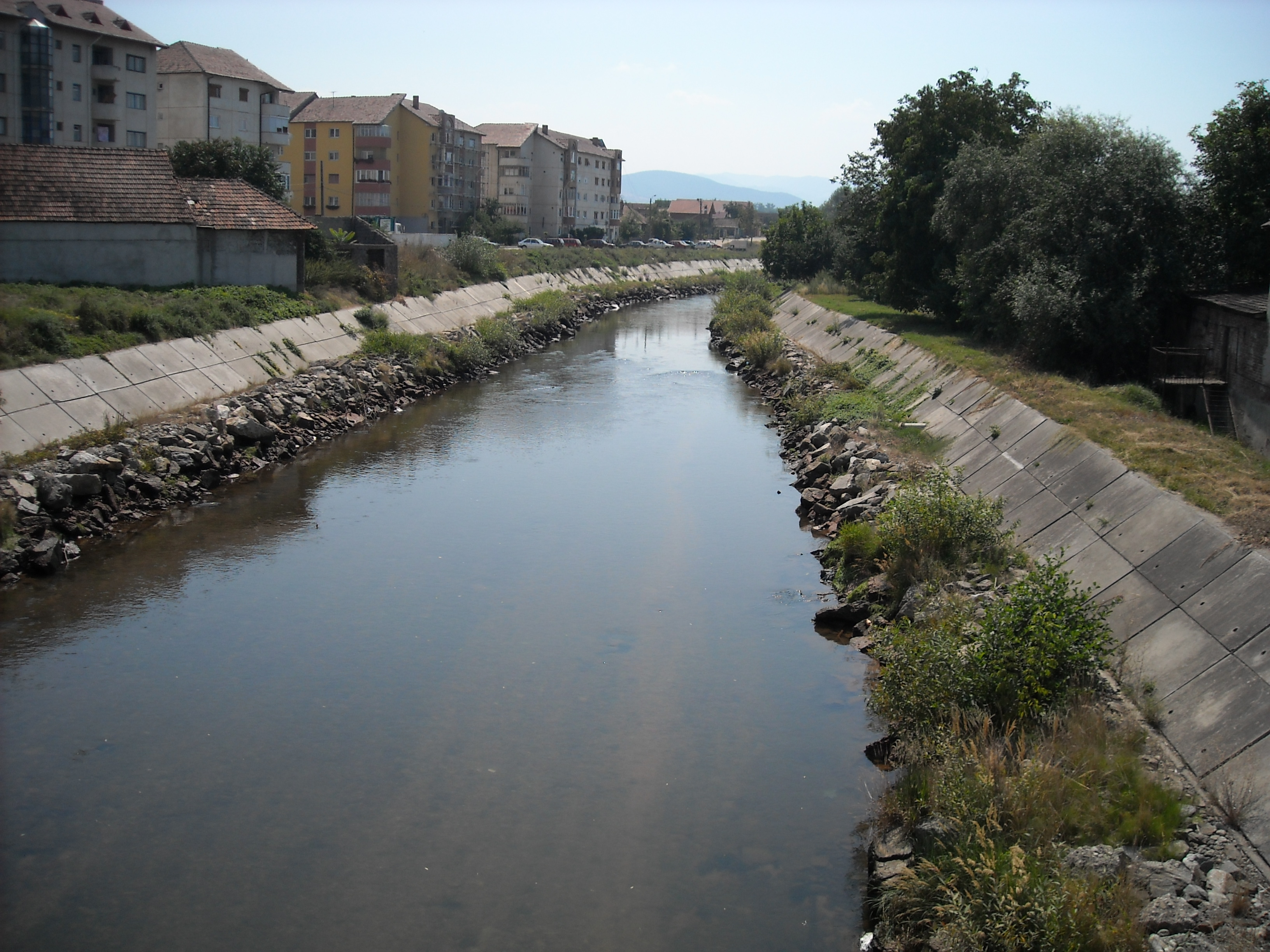

- Location within Romania

Location
- Country: Romania
- Counties: Mureș County
- Villages: Sebeș

Physical characteristics
- Source: Gurghiu Mountains
- Mouth: Mureș
  - location: Sebeș
  - coordinates: 46.934°N 24.858°E
- Length: 11 km (6.8 mi)
- Basin size: 30 km^{2} (12 sq mi)

Basin features
- Progression: Mureș→ Tisza→ Danube→ Black Sea

The Sebeș (Hungarian: Sebes-patak, meaning "Speedy Creek") is a river in the Gurghiu Mountains, Mureș County, northern Romania. It is a left tributary of the river Mureș. It flows through the commune of Rușii-Munți, and joins the Mureș in the village Sebeș. Its length is 11 km (6.8 mi) and its basin size is 30 km^{2} (12 sq mi).
