= Sibișel =

Sibișel may refer to the following places in Romania:

- Sibișel, Beriu, a village in Beriu Commune, Hunedoara County
- Sibișel, a village in Râu de Mori Commune, Hunedoara County
- Sibișel, another name for the river Valea Caselor in Sibiu County
- Sibișel (Orăștie), a tributary of the river Orăștie in Hunedoara County
- Sibișel (Strei), a tributary of the river Râul Mare in Hunedoara County

== See also ==
- Sebeș (disambiguation)
