= Julița =

Julița Gyulica-patak
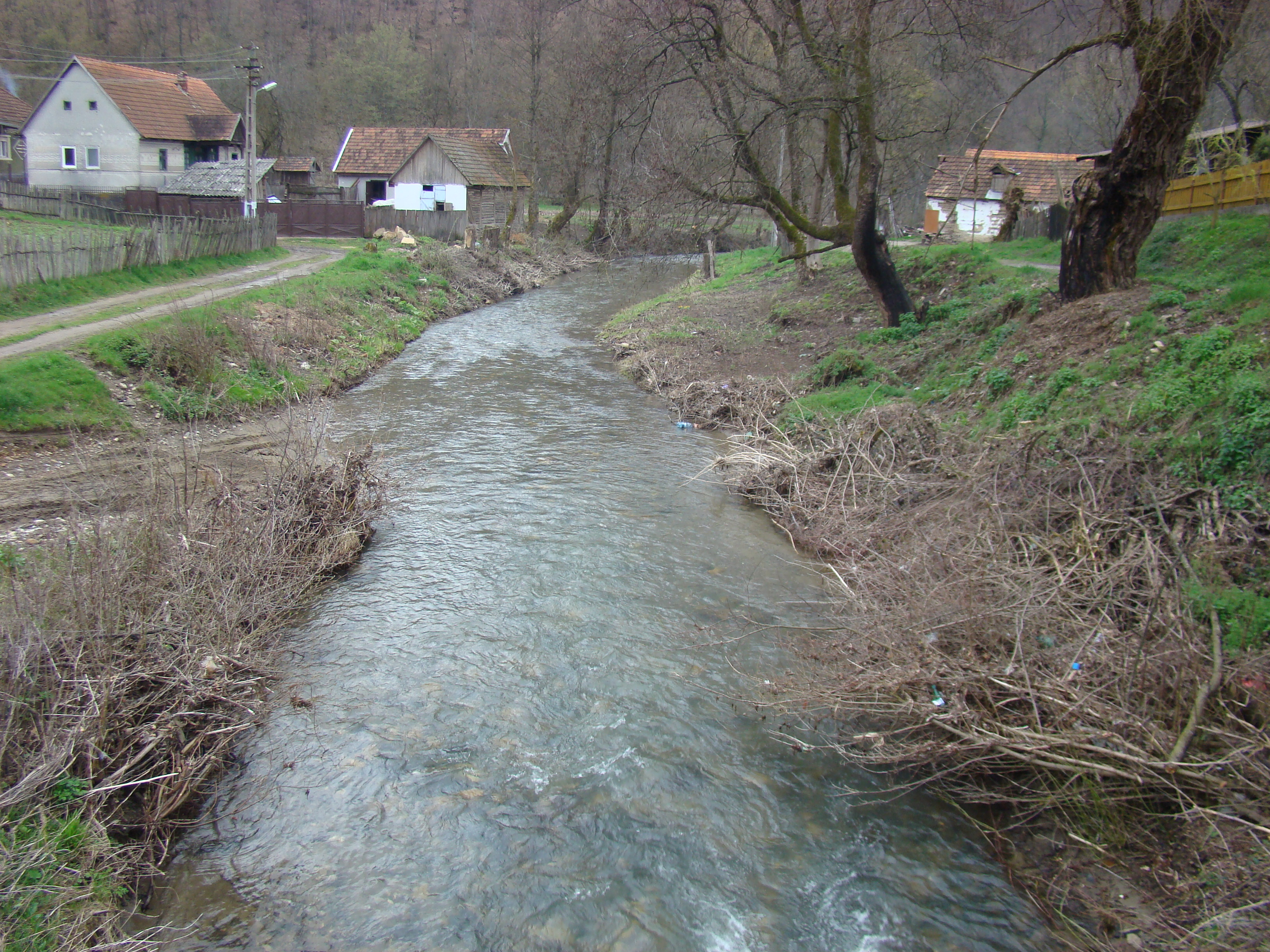

- Location within Romania

Location
- Country: Romania
- Counties: Arad County
- Villages: Baia, Julița

Physical characteristics
- Mouth: Mureș
  - location: Julița
  - coordinates: 46.0146°N 22.1277°E
- Length: 25 km (16 mi)
- Basin size: 78 km^{2} (30 sq mi)

Basin features
- Progression: Mureș→ Tisza→ Danube→ Black Sea
- Tributaries
  - left: Vlavul

The Julița (Hungarian: Gyulica-patak) is a right tributary of the river Mureș in Romania. It discharges into the Mureș near the village Vărădia de Mureș. Its length is 25 km (16 mi) and its basin size is 78 km^{2} (30 sq mi).
