= Gurasada (river) =

Gurasada Guraszáda-patak
- Location within Romania

Location
- Country: Romania
- Counties: Hunedoara County
- Villages: Dănulești, Cărmăzănești, Gurasada

Physical characteristics
- Mouth: Mureș
  - location: Gothatea
  - coordinates: 45.9378°N 22.6036°E
- Length: 18 km (11 mi)
- Basin size: 64 km^{2} (25 sq mi)

Basin features
- Progression: Mureș→ Tisza→ Danube→ Black Sea
- Tributaries
  - left: Mihăileasca
  - right: Vica

The Gurasada (Hungarian: Guraszáda-patak) is a right tributary of the river Mureș in Transylvania, Romania. It discharges into the Mureș in Gothatea. Its length is 18 km (11 mi) and its basin size is 64 km^{2} (25 sq mi).
