= Sebeșu =

Sebeșu may refer to one of two places in Sibiu County, Romania:

- Sebeșu de Jos, a village in Turnu Roșu Commune
- Sebeșu de Sus, a village in Racovița Commune

== See also ==
- Sebeș (disambiguation)
