= Grosul =

Grosul Gróssi-patak
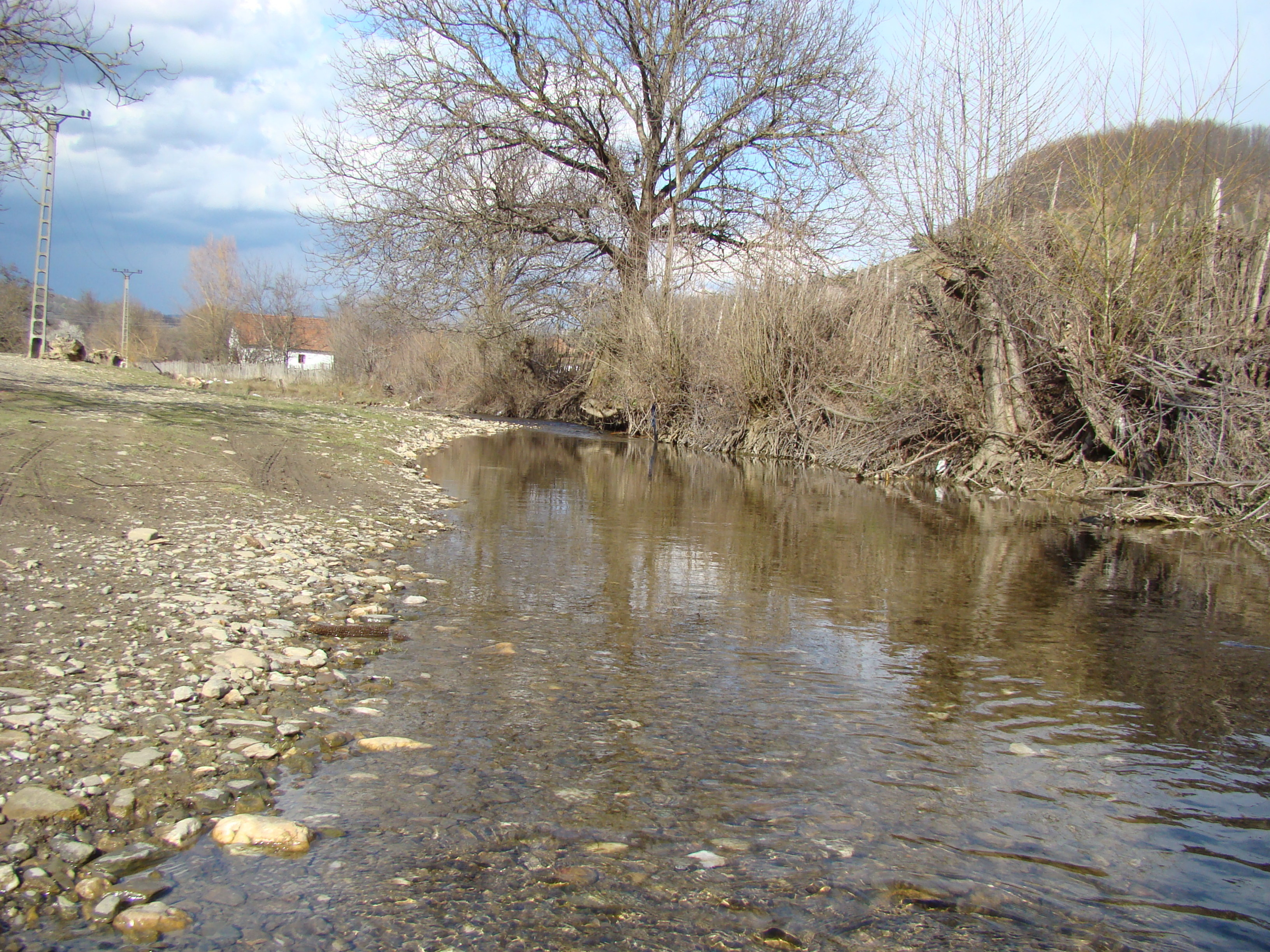

- Location within Romania

Location
- Country: Romania
- Counties: Arad County
- Villages: Groșii Noi, Dumbrăvița, Căpruța

Physical characteristics
- Mouth: Mureș
  - location: Căpruța
  - coordinates: 46.0878°N 22.0210°E
- Length: 20 km (12 mi)
- Basin size: 81 km^{2} (31 sq mi)

Basin features
- Progression: Mureș→ Tisza→ Danube→ Black Sea
- Tributaries
  - right: Ușoiu, Plișca

The Grosul (Hungarian: Gróssi-patak) is a right tributary of the river Mureș in Romania. It discharges into the Mureș in Căpruța. Its length is 20 km (12 mi) and its basin size is 81 km^{2} (31 sq mi).
