= Băcăinți =

Băcăinți Bokaj-patak
- Location within Romania

Location
- Country: Romania
- Counties: Alba County
- Villages: Fântânele, Bolovănești, Ceru-Băcăinți, Băcăinți

Physical characteristics
- Mouth: Mureș
  - location: Băcăinți
  - coordinates: 45.9302°N 23.2883°E
- Length: 14 km (8.7 mi)
- Basin size: 55 km^{2} (21 sq mi)

Basin features
- Progression: Mureș→ Tisza→ Danube→ Black Sea
- Tributaries
  - left: Curpeni

The Băcăinți (Hungarian: Bokaj-patak) is a right tributary of the river Mureș in Romania. It discharges into the Mureș in the village Băcăinți. Its length is 14 km (8.7 mi) and its basin size is 55 km^{2} (21 sq mi).
