= Belinul Mare =

- Location within Romania

Location
- Country: Romania
- Counties: Covasna County
- Villages: Belin-Vale, Belin

Physical characteristics
- Mouth: Olt
  - location: Belin
  - coordinates: 45.9304°N 25.5455°E
- Length: 13 km (8.1 mi)
- Basin size: 30 km^{2} (12 sq mi)

Basin features
- Progression: Olt→ Danube→ Black Sea
- Tributaries
  - left: Belinul Mic

The Belinul Mare is a right tributary of the river Olt in Romania. It flows into the Olt in Belin. Its length is 13 km (8.1 mi) and its basin size is 30 km^{2} (12 sq mi).
