= Belcina =

Belcina Békény-patak, Belchia
- Location within Romania

Location
- Country: Romania
- Counties: Harghita County
- Villages: Gheorgheni, Joseni

Physical characteristics
- Source: Hășmaș Mountains
- Mouth: Mureș
  - location: Joseni
  - coordinates: 46.7034°N 25.4712°E

Basin features
- Progression: Mureș→ Tisza→ Danube→ Black Sea
- Tributaries
  - left: Gherpătocul Mare, Gherpătocul Mic, Modoroș, Mogoș Biuc
  - right: Cianod, Cetatea

The Belcina (also: Belchia, Hungarian: Békény-patak) is a right tributary of the river Mureș in Transylvania, Romania. It flows through the town Gheorgheni, and joins the Mureș near the village Joseni. Its length is 33 km (21 mi) and its basin size is 109 km^{2} (42 sq mi).
