= Boz (Mureș) =

Boz Boz-patak
- Location within Romania

Location
- Country: Romania
- Counties: Hunedoara County
- Villages: Gialacuta, Boz

Physical characteristics
- Mouth: Mureș
  - location: Boz
  - coordinates: 45.9249°N 22.7481°E
- Length: 22 km (14 mi)
- Basin size: 70 km^{2} (27 sq mi)

Basin features
- Progression: Mureș→ Tisza→ Danube→ Black Sea
- Tributaries
  - right: Furcșoara, Bărăști

The Boz (Hungarian: Boz-patak) is a right tributary of the river Mureș in Romania. It discharges into the Mureș near the village Boz. Its length is 22 km (14 mi) and its basin size is 70 km^{2} (27 sq mi).
