= Boian (river) =

- Location within Romania

Location
- Country: Romania
- Counties: Bihor County
- Villages: Huta, Boianu Mare, Păgaia

Physical characteristics
- Mouth: Inot
  - location: Păgaia
  - coordinates: 47.4035°N 22.5046°E
- Length: 8 km (5.0 mi)
- Basin size: 16 km^{2} (6.2 sq mi)

Basin features
- Progression: Inot→ Barcău→ Crișul Repede→ Körös→ Tisza→ Danube→ Black Sea
- River code: III.1.44.33.13.1

The Boian is a left tributary of the river Inot in Romania. It flows into the Inot in Păgaia. Its length is 8 km (5.0 mi) and its basin size is 16 km^{2} (6.2 sq mi).
