= Brănișca =

- Commune
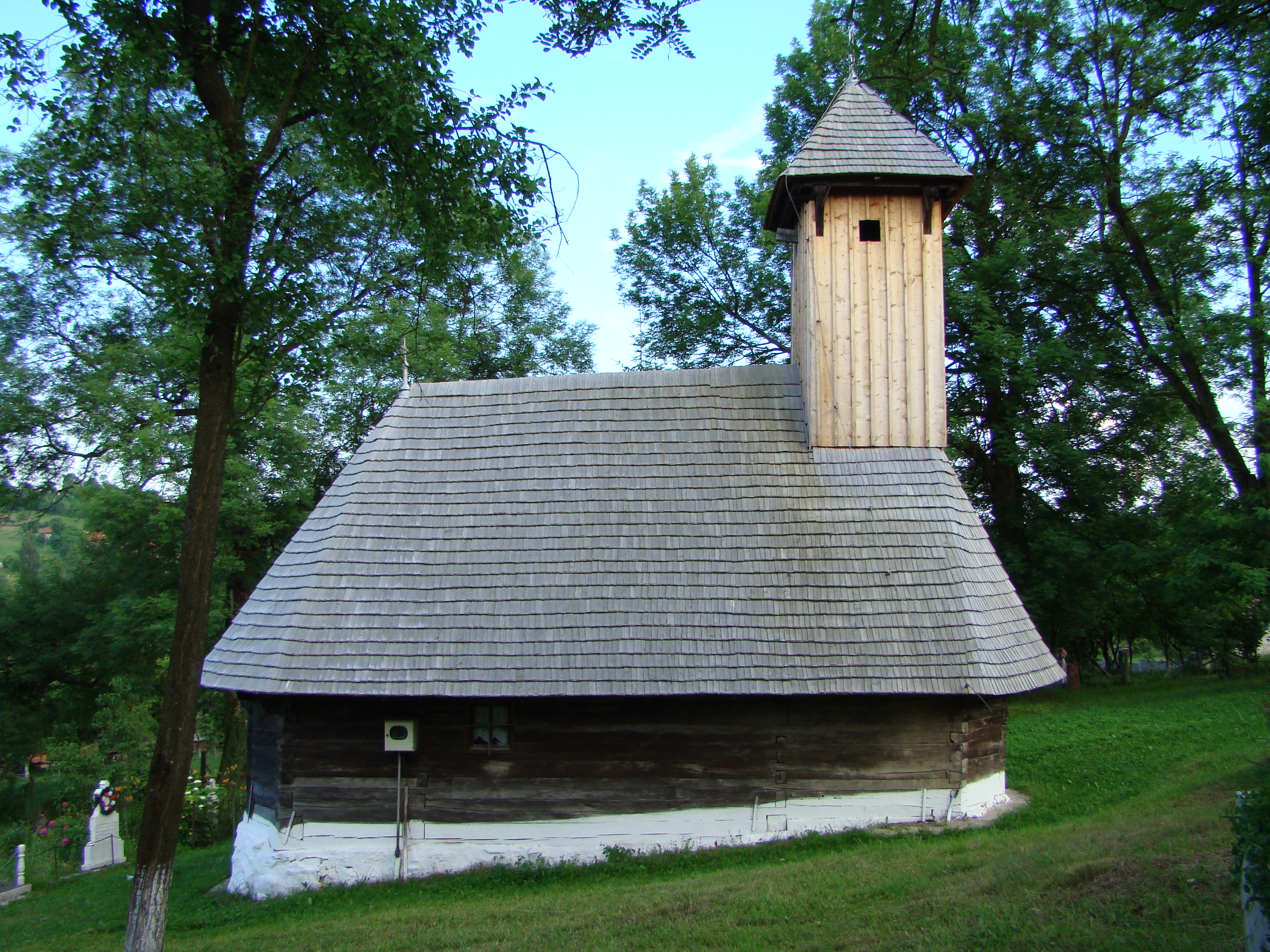
- Wooden church in Târnava

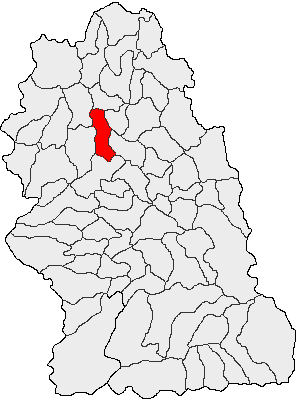
- Location in Hunedoara County

- Location in Romania
- Coordinates: 45°55′N 22°47′E
- Country: Romania
- County: Hunedoara

Government
  - Mayor (2024–2028): Adel Ștef (PSD)
- Area: 73.14 km^{2} (28.24 sq mi)
- Elevation: 202 m (663 ft)
- Population (2021-12-01): 1,554
  - Density: 21.25/km^{2} (55.03/sq mi)
- Time zone: UTC+02:00 (EET)
  - Summer (DST): UTC+03:00 (EEST)
- Postal code: 337105
- Area code: (+40) 0254
- Vehicle reg.: HD
- Website: www.primariabranisca.ro

Brănișca (Hungarian: Branyicska, German: Bernpfaff) is a commune in Hunedoara County, Transylvania, Romania. It is composed of nine villages: Bărăștii Iliei (Baresd), Boz (Bóz), Brănișca, Căbești (Kabesd), Furcșoara (Furksora), Gialacuta (Gyálakuta), Rovina (Bikótelep), Târnava (Tirnáva), and Târnăvița (Tirnavica).

The commune is located in the central part of Hunedoara County, 15 km (9.3 mi) northwest of the county seat, Deva. It lies on the right bank of the Mureș River and of its tributary, the river Boz, on the southern slopes of the Metaliferi Mountains.

The Brănișca train station serves the CFR Main Line 200, running from Brașov towards Timișoara and the border with Hungary. The A1 motorway (part of E68) crosses the commune on its northern side.

Historical population
Year	Pop.	±%
1850	2,643	—
1910	4,639	+75.5%
1956	3,472	−25.2%
1992	2,015	−42.0%
2002	1,831	−9.1%
2011	1,767	−3.5%
2021	1,554	−12.1%
Source: Census data
