= Bobâlna (river) =

Bobâlna Bábolna-patak
- Location within Romania

Location
- Country: Romania
- Counties: Hunedoara County
- Villages: Bobâlna

Physical characteristics
- Mouth: Mureș
  - coordinates: 45.8640°N 23.1356°E
- Length: 12 km (7.5 mi)
- Basin size: 15 km^{2} (5.8 sq mi)

Basin features
- Progression: Mureș→ Tisza→ Danube→ Black Sea

The Bobâlna (Hungarian: Bábolna-patak) is a right tributary of the river Mureș in Transylvania, Romania. It discharges into the Mureș in the village Bobâlna. Its length is 12 km (7.5 mi) and its basin size is 15 km^{2} (5.8 sq mi).
