= Gurasada =

- Commune
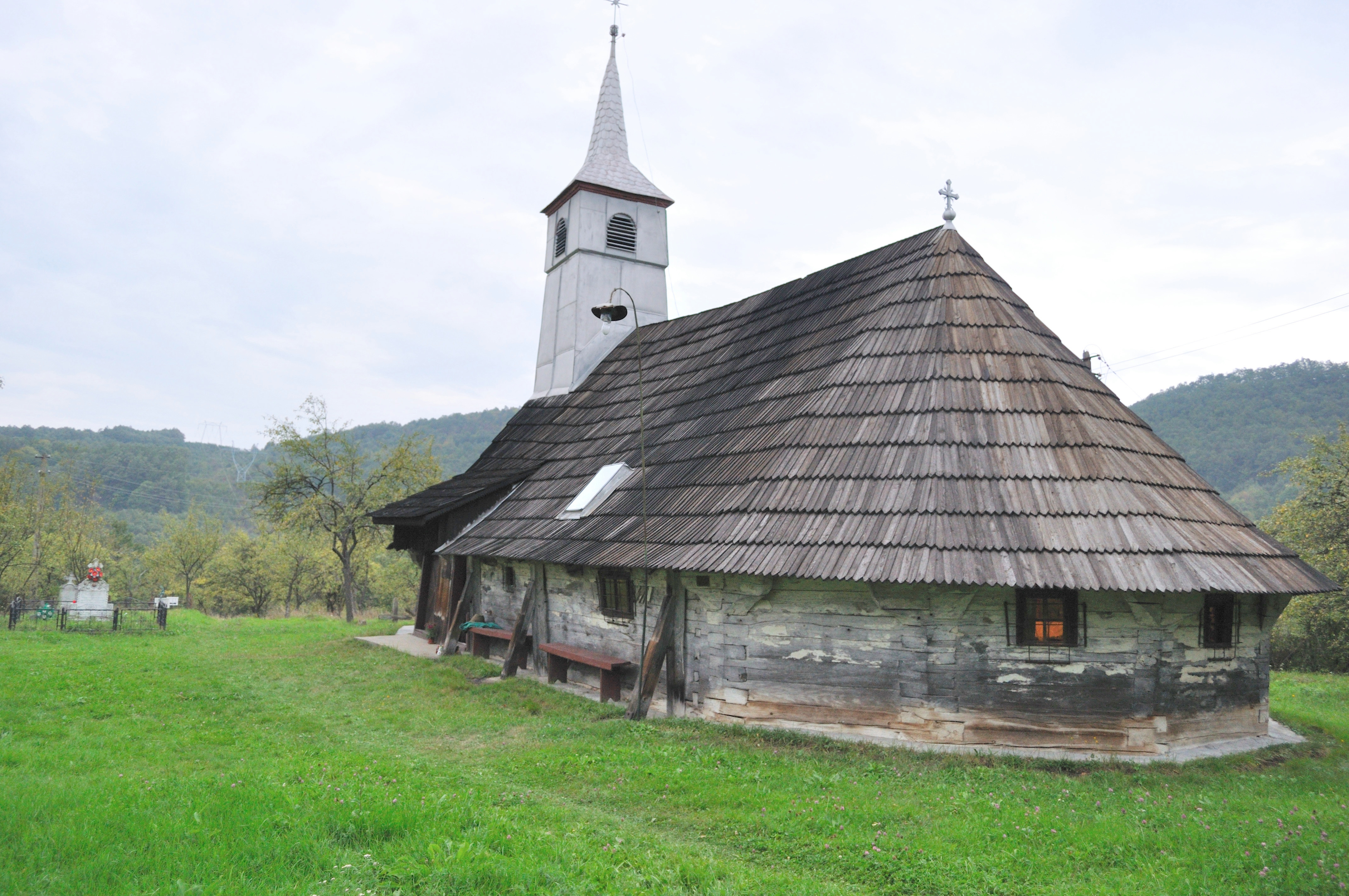
- Wooden church in Câmpuri de Sus

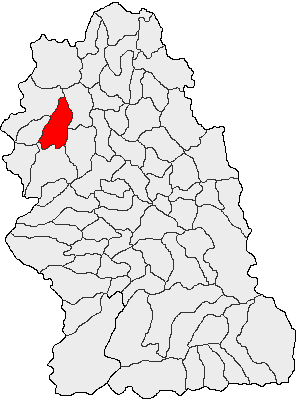
- Location in Hunedoara County

- Location in Romania
- Coordinates: 45°57′10″N 22°35′30″E
- Country: Romania
- County: Hunedoara

Government
  - Mayor (2020–2024): Silviu Nan (PSD)
- Area: 92.95 km^{2} (35.89 sq mi)
- Elevation: 180 m (590 ft)
- Population (2021-12-01): 1,193
  - Density: 12.83/km^{2} (33.24/sq mi)
- Time zone: UTC+02:00 (EET)
  - Summer (DST): UTC+03:00 (EEST)
- Postal code: 337245
- Area code: (+40) 02 54
- Vehicle reg.: HD
- Website: www.comunagurasada.ro

Gurasada (Hungarian: Guraszáda, German: Zaadt) is a commune in Hunedoara County, Transylvania, Romania. It is composed of eleven villages: Boiu de Jos (Alsóboj), Boiu de Sus (Felsőboj), Cărmăzănești (Karmazinesd), Câmpuri de Sus (Kimpur), Câmpuri-Surduc (Kimpényszurduk), Dănulești (Danulesd), Gothatea (Gothátya), Gurasada, Runcșor (Runksor), Ulieș (Ullyes), and Vica (Vika).

The commune is located on the middle course of the river Mureș, in the northwestern part of the county, at a distance of 28 km (17 mi) from county seat, Deva. This region is situated at the junction of the Transylvania and Banat historical provinces. Its neighbours are the communes of Zam, Ilia, Dobra, and Burjuc.

Gurasada covers an area of 92.95 km^{2} (35.89 sq mi), representing 1.2% of the surface of Hunedoara County. Although its surface is not very large, an important variety of rocks constituents can be found. The variety of the landform is one of the most interesting attraction of this territory. The lowest altitude is situated next to the Mureș River, 170 m (560 ft) above sea level. The river Gurasada flows through Dănulești, Cărmăzănești, and Gurasada villages, discharging into the Mureș in Gothatea village.

Gurasada is known for its churches: The church from Gurasada, the main village, is an Orthodox one, and the painting from inside the bell-tower is dated in 1765, in the 18th century, when the church was painted again. This church is situated on the main road between Deva and Arad. There are also old churches in some villages of Gurasada: the old church from Dănulești, made of wood, the old church from Carmazănești, the church from Gothatea, made of wood.

In communal area there is a natural reservation with horned vipers. There is a cavern in Boiu with a number of 27 natural cavities explored between 1976 and 1978. A park with very rare tree species: tulip trees, Canadian pine, shrubs and bushes, a bamboo plantation and other species, 175–200 years old oak trees. In this area there are two important quarries for exploitation of chalkstone.

Historical population
Year	Pop.	±%
1850	4,173	—
1910	4,875	+16.8%
2002	1,783	−63.4%
2011	1,492	−16.3%
2021	1,193	−20.0%
Source: Census data

== Natives ==
- Silviu Dragomir (1888 – 1962), historian and politician, member of the Romanian Academy
