= Băcișoara =

Băcișoara Bátsisora
- Location within Romania

Location
- Country: Romania
- Counties: Hunedoara County
- Villages: Bacea, Ilia

Physical characteristics
- Mouth: Mureș
  - location: Ilia
  - coordinates: 45.9323°N 22.6433°E
- Length: 11 km (6.8 mi)
- Basin size: 27 km^{2} (10 sq mi)

Basin features
- Progression: Mureș→ Tisza→ Danube→ Black Sea

The Băcișoara (Hungarian: Bátsisora-patak) is a right tributary of the river Mureș in Romania. It discharges into the Mureș in Ilia. Its length is 11 km (6.8 mi) and its basin size is 27 km^{2} (10 sq mi).
