= Valea Vințului =

Valea Vințului Vinc-patak
- Location within Romania

Location
- Country: Romania
- Counties: Alba County
- Villages: Gura Cuțului, Valea Vințului

Physical characteristics
- Mouth: Mureș
  - location: Vințu de Jos
  - coordinates: 46.0018°N 23.4768°E
- Length: 13 km (8.1 mi)
- Basin size: 30 km^{2} (12 sq mi)

Basin features
- Progression: Mureș→ Tisza→ Danube→ Black Sea

The Valea Vințului (Hungarian: Vinc-patak) is a right tributary of the river Mureș in Transylvania, Romania. It discharges into the Mureș in Vințu de Jos. Its length is 13 km (8.1 mi) and its basin size is 30 km^{2} (12 sq mi).
