= Blandiana (river) =

Blandiana Karna-patak
- Location within Romania

Location
- Country: Romania
- Counties: Alba County
- Villages: Blandiana

Physical characteristics
- Mouth: Mureș
  - location: Blandiana
  - coordinates: 45.9668°N 23.4072°E
- Length: 11 km (6.8 mi)
- Basin size: 31 km^{2} (12 sq mi)

Basin features
- Progression: Mureș→ Tisza→ Danube→ Black Sea

The Blandiana (Hungarian: Karna-patak) is a right tributary of the river Mureș in Romania. It discharges into the Mureș in the village Blandiana. Its length is 11 km (6.8 mi) and its basin size is 31 km^{2} (12 sq mi).
