= Boholt =

Boholt Boholt-patak
- Location within Romania

Location
- Country: Romania
- Counties: Hunedoara County
- Villages: Toplița Mureșului, Boholt, Șoimuș

Physical characteristics
- Mouth: Mureș
  - location: Șoimuș
  - coordinates: 45.9152°N 22.8707°E
- Length: 12 km (7.5 mi)
- Basin size: 23 km^{2} (8.9 sq mi)

Basin features
- Progression: Mureș→ Tisza→ Danube→ Black Sea

The Boholt (Romanian: Râul Boholt, lit. 'the river Boholt', Hungarian: Boholt-patak, lit. 'Boholt creek') is a right tributary of the river Mureș in Romania. It discharges into the Mureș in Șoimuș. Its length is 12 km (7.5 mi) and its basin size is 23 km^{2} (8.9 sq mi).
