= Sărmaș =

- Commune
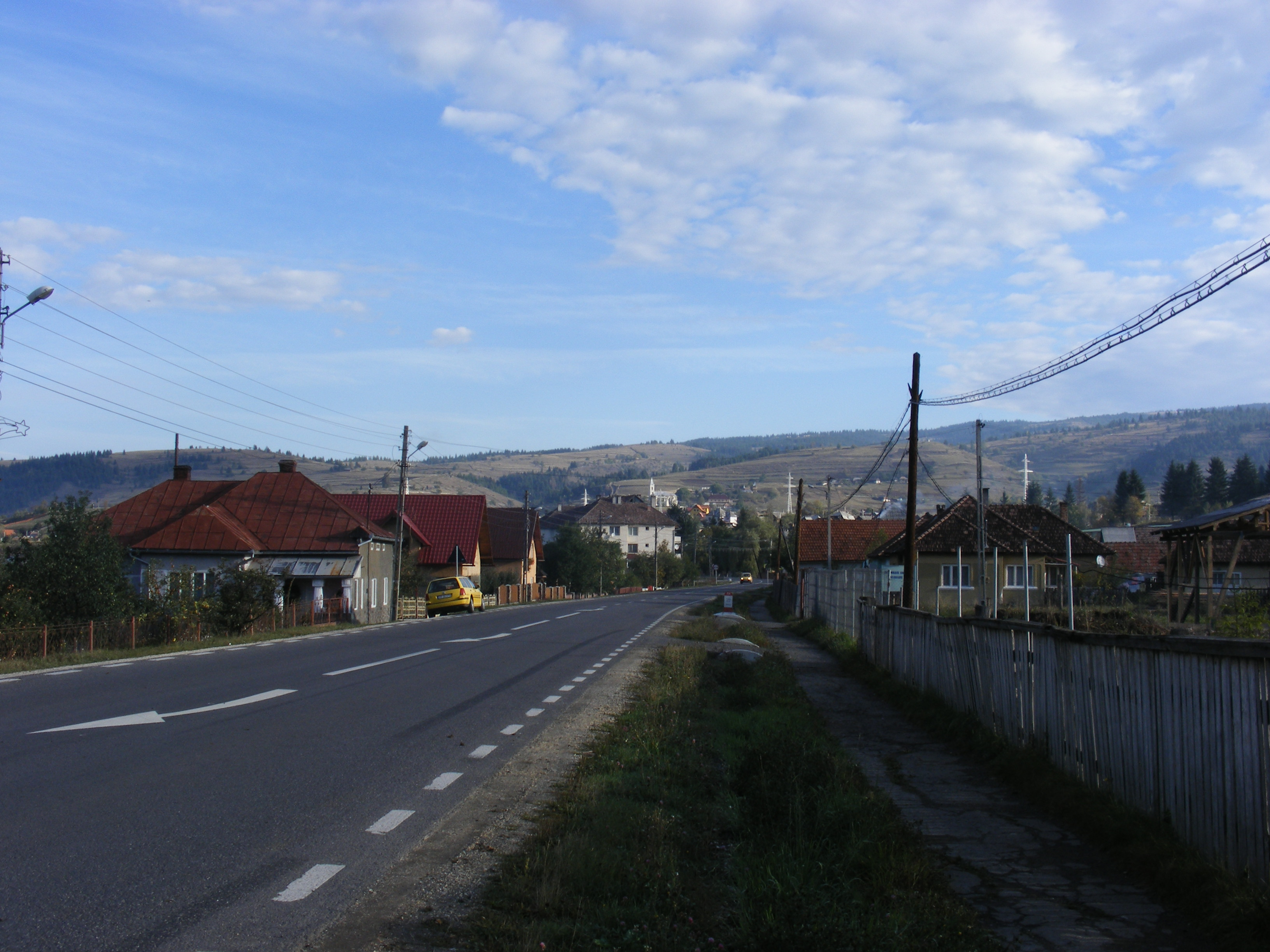

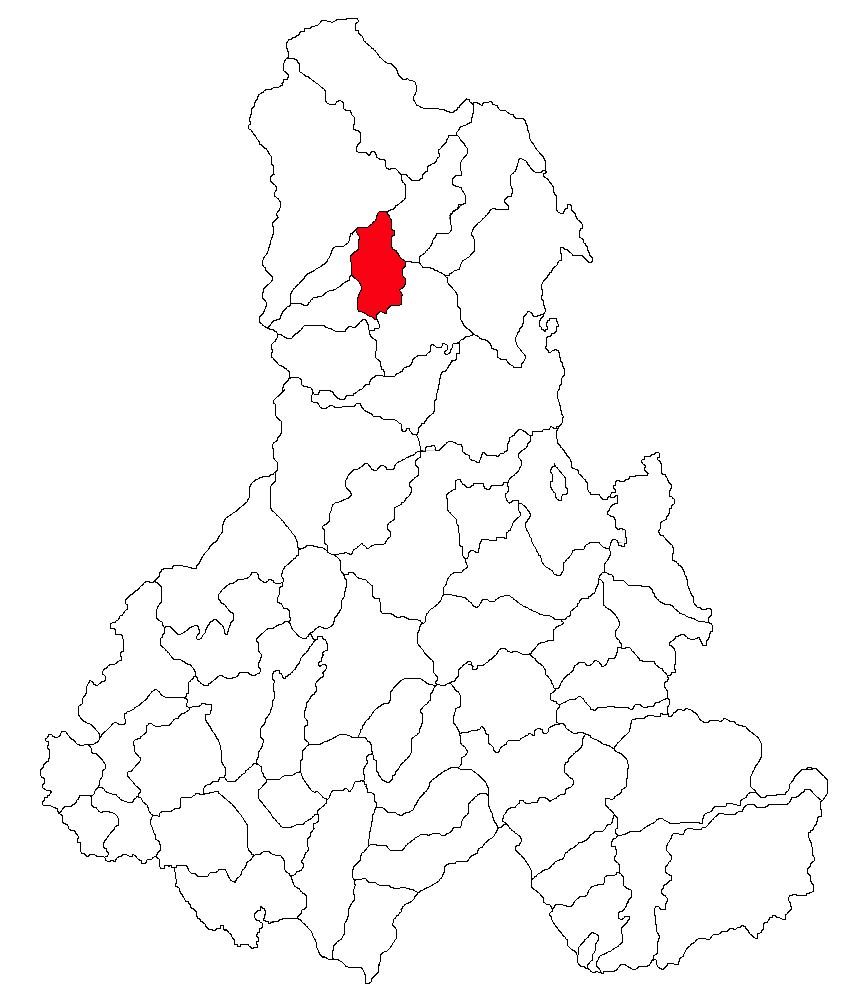
- Location in Harghita County

- Location in Romania
- Coordinates: 46°53′N 25°28′E
- Country: Romania
- County: Harghita

Government
  - Mayor (2020–2024): Valentin Mîndru (PSD)
- Area: 72 km^{2} (28 sq mi)
- Elevation: 718 m (2,356 ft)
- Population (2021-12-01): 3,366
  - Density: 47/km^{2} (120/sq mi)
- Time zone: UTC+02:00 (EET)
  - Summer (DST): UTC+03:00 (EEST)
- Postal code: 537260
- Area code: +(40) x66
- Vehicle reg.: HR
- Website: comunasarmashr.ro

Sărmaș (Hungarian: Salamás) is a commune in Harghita County, Transylvania, Romania. Ethnic Romanians represent the majority. The commune is composed of five villages: Hodoșa (Gyergyóhodos), Fundoaia (Fundoja), Platonești (Kerekfenyő), Runc (Runk), and Sărmaș.

== Demographics ==
At the 2002 census, 80.6% of inhabitants were Romanians and 19.2% Hungarians; all villages had a Romanian majority, with Hungarian residents concentrated in Sărmaș, Hodoșa, and Runc. At the 2021 census, Sărmaș had a population of 3,366; of those, 79.17% were Romanians and 14.08% Hungarians.

== Natives ==
- Nicolae Răcean (born 1963), rugby union player and coach
