= Bârzava, Arad =

Bârzava
- Commune
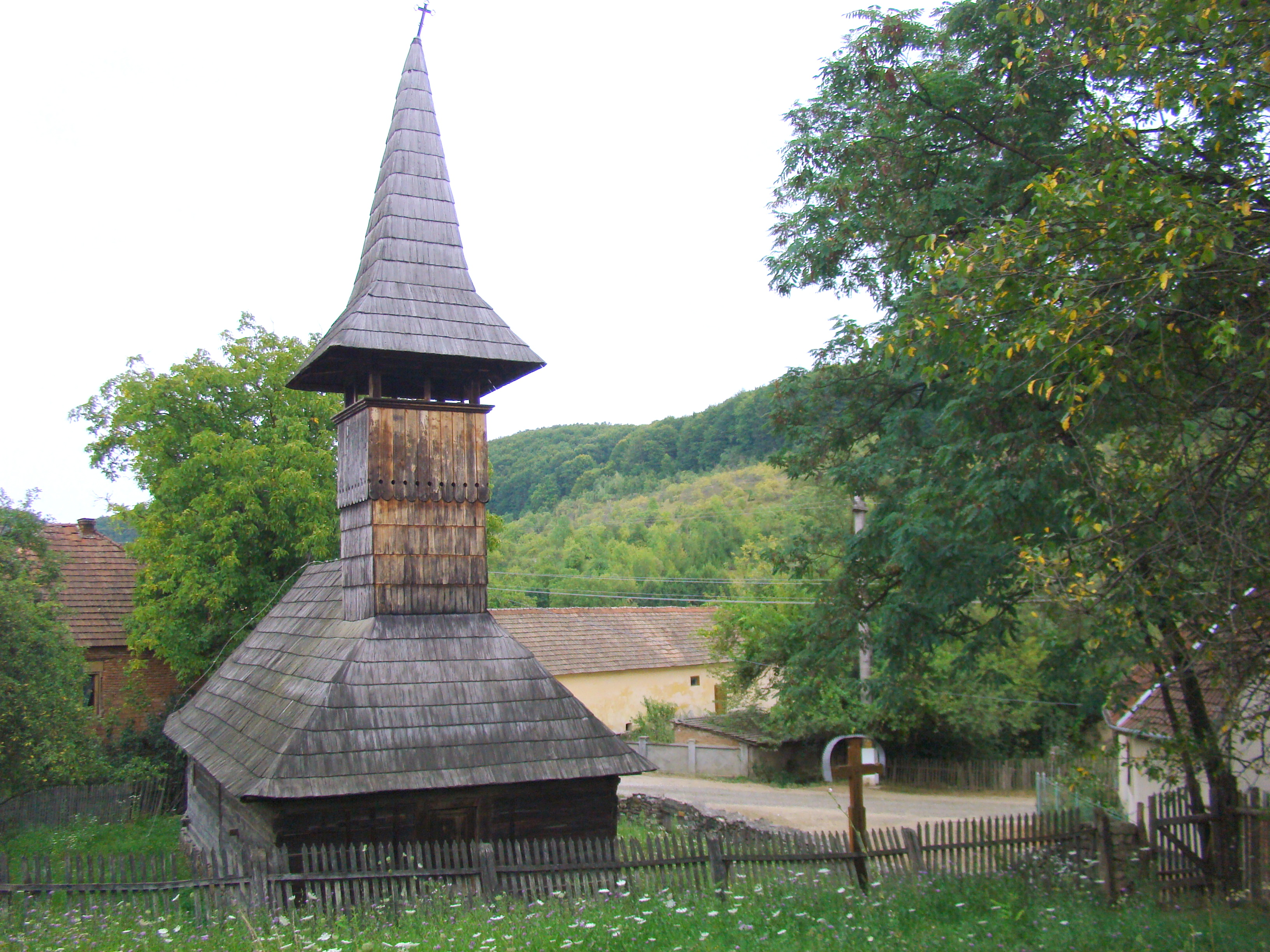
- Wooden church in Groșii Noi village

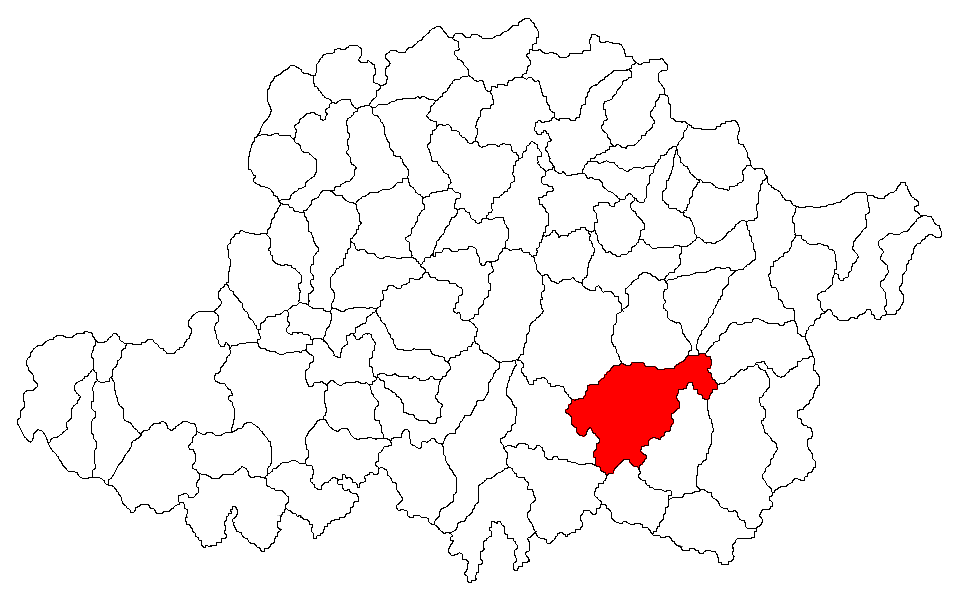
- Location in Arad County

- Location in Romania
- Coordinates: 46°7′N 21°59′E
- Country: Romania
- County: Arad
- Population (2021-12-01): 2,575
- Time zone: UTC+02:00 (EET)
  - Summer (DST): UTC+03:00 (EEST)
- Vehicle reg.: AR

Bârzava (Hungarian: Berzova) is a commune in Arad County, Romania. The commune Bârzava is situated at the foot of Zărand Mountains, at its contact point with Metaliferi Mountains, along the river Bârzava - a right tributary of the Mureș. It is composed of eight villages: Bârzava (situated at 61 km from Arad), Bătuța (Battuca), Căpruța (Kapruca), Dumbrăvița (Alsódombró), Groșii Noi (Garassa), Lalașinț (Lalánc), Monoroștia (Marosmonyoró) and Slatina de Mureș (Marosszlatina).

== Population ==
According to the last census, the population of the commune counts 3019 inhabitants, out of which 98% are Romanians, 0.4% Hungarians, 1% Roma and 0.6% are of other or undeclared nationalities.

== History ==
The first documentary record of the locality Bârzava dates back to 1471. Bătuța was mentioned in documents in 1851, Căpruța in 1350, Dumbrăvița in 1471, Groșii Noi in 1515, Lalașinț in 1585, Monoroștia in 1350 and Slatina de Mureș in 1439.

== Economy ==
The economic sectors are well represented at commune level. Besides agriculture, the industry of building materials and timber industry are present in significant proportion.

== Tourism ==
The natural reservation Runcu-Groși (botanical reservation with an area of approx. 261.8 ha), the palaeontological reservation Monoroștia, the wooden church Presentation of Jesus, a historical and architectural monument dating back to 1807, are the most important touristic sights of the commune.
