= Bârzava (Mureș) =

Bârzava Berzova-patak
- Location within Romania

Location
- Country: Romania
- Counties: Arad County

Physical characteristics
- Mouth: Mureș
  - location: Bârzava
  - coordinates: 46.0910°N 21.9761°E
- Length: 18 km (11 mi)
- Basin size: 44 km^{2} (17 sq mi)

Basin features
- Progression: Mureș→ Tisza→ Danube→ Black Sea

The Bârzava (Hungarian: Berzova-patak) is a right tributary of the river Mureș in Romania. It discharges into the Mureș in the village Bârzava. Its length is 18 km (11 mi) and its basin size is 44 km^{2} (17 sq mi).
