= Boianu Mare =

- Commune
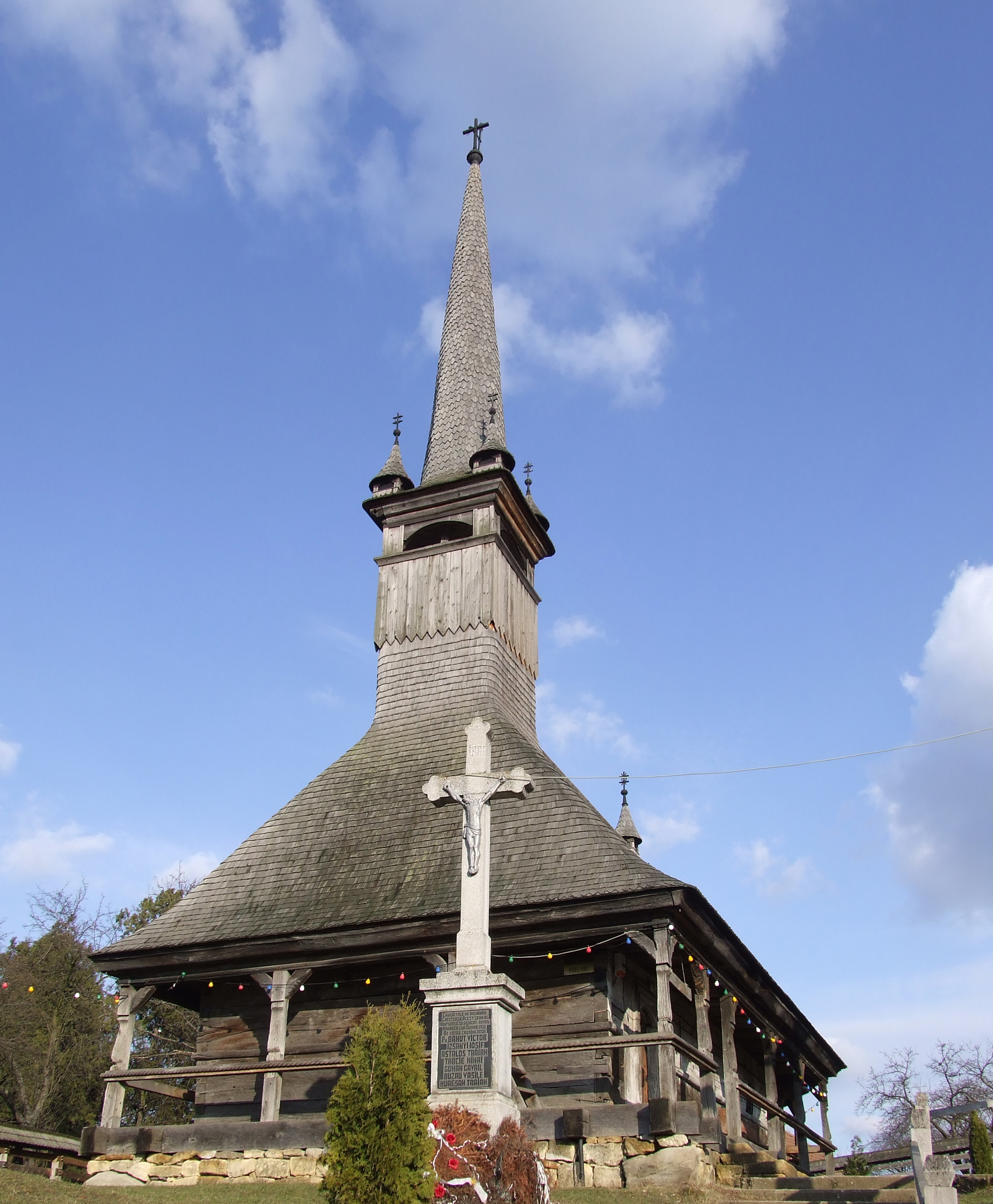
- Wooden Church in Boianu Mare

- Location in Bihor County

- Location in Romania
- Coordinates: 47°22′57″N 22°31′20″E
- Country: Romania
- County: Bihor

Government
  - Mayor (2020–2024): Ioan Bandula (PNL)
- Area: 41.33 km^{2} (15.96 sq mi)
- Elevation: 185 m (607 ft)
- Population (2021-12-01): 1,028
  - Density: 24.87/km^{2} (64.42/sq mi)
- Time zone: UTC+02:00 (EET)
  - Summer (DST): UTC+03:00 (EEST)
- Postal code: 417060
- Area code: +(40) 259
- Vehicle reg.: BH
- Website: www.comuna-boianumare.ro

Boianu Mare (Hungarian: Tasnádbajom) is a commune in Bihor County, Crișana, Romania. It is composed of five villages: Boianu Mare, Corboaia (Korbolyatelep), Huta (Hutatelep), Păgaia (Úsztató), and Rugea (Ruzsatag).

Historical population
Year	Pop.	±%
1850	840	—
1880	750	−10.7%
1890	963	+28.4%
1900	1,310	+36.0%
1910	1,839	+40.4%
1920	1,755	−4.6%
1930	2,388	+36.1%
1941	2,801	+17.3%
1956	2,521	−10.0%
1966	2,298	−8.8%
1977	1,938	−15.7%
1992	1,531	−21.0%
2002	1,428	−6.7%
2011	1,343	−6.0%
2021	1,028	−23.5%
Source: Census data

At the 2021 census, the commune had a population of 1,028; of those, 87.79% were Romanians, 3.79% Hungarians, and 1.46% Roma.

== Sights ==
- Wooden Church in Boianu Mare, built in the 18th century (1710), historic monument
