= Pănet =

Pănet Mezőpanit
- Commune
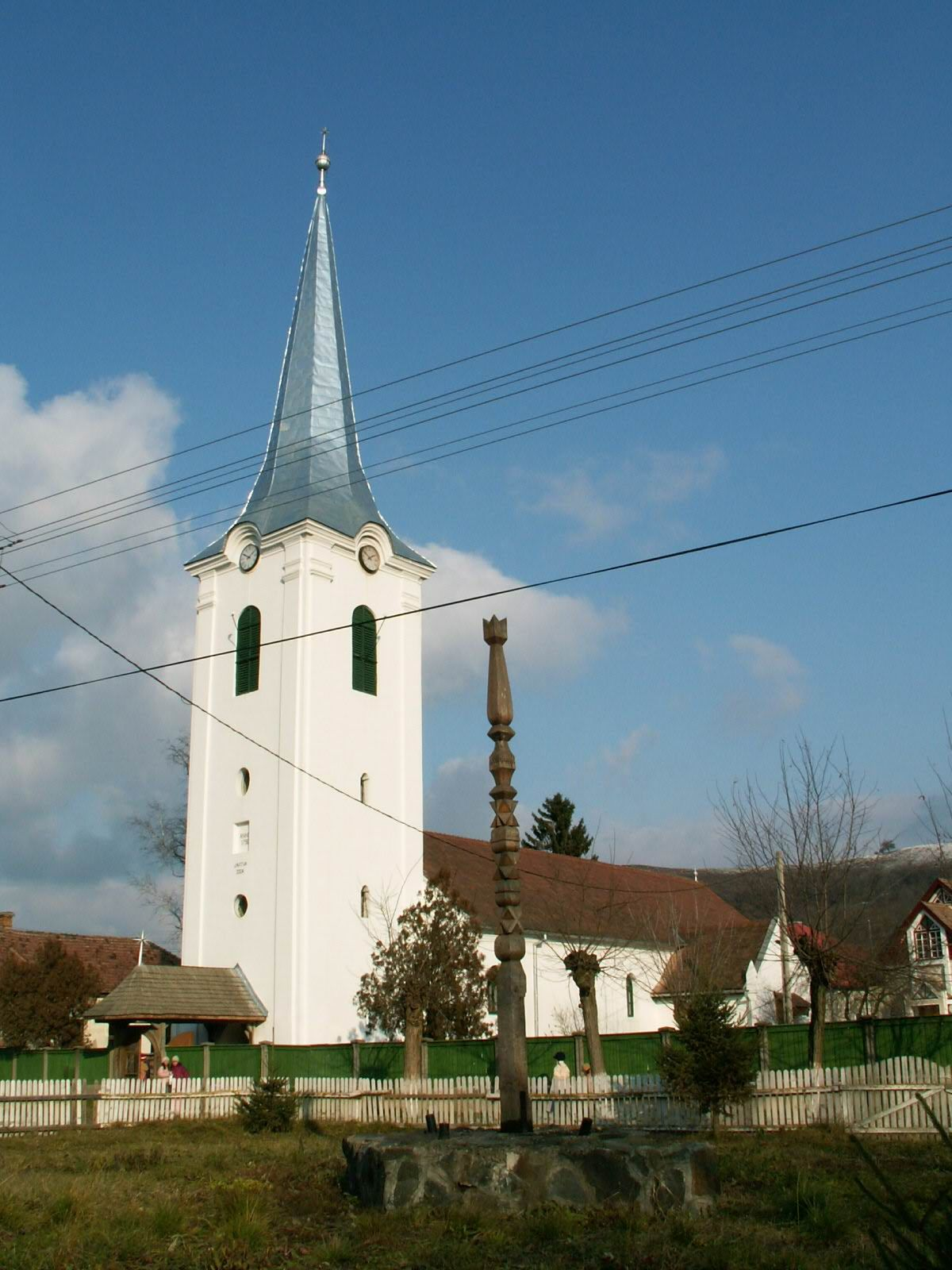
- Reformed church in Pănet

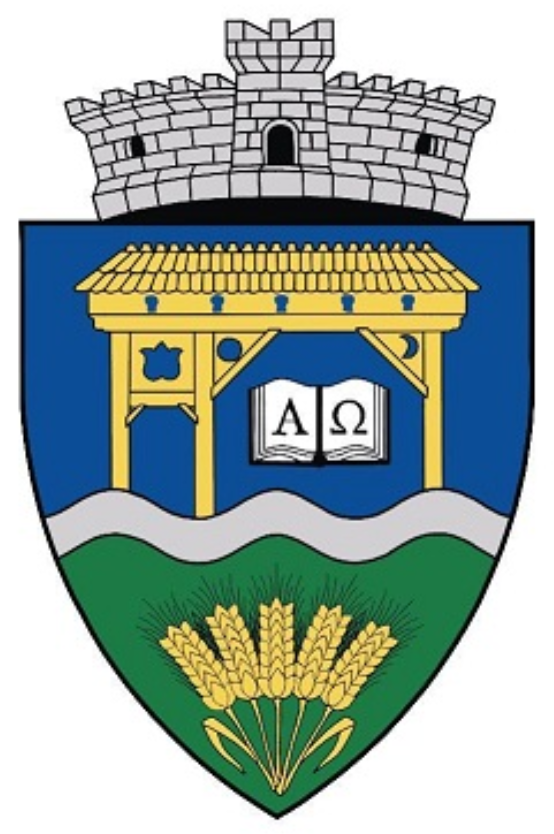
- Coat of arms

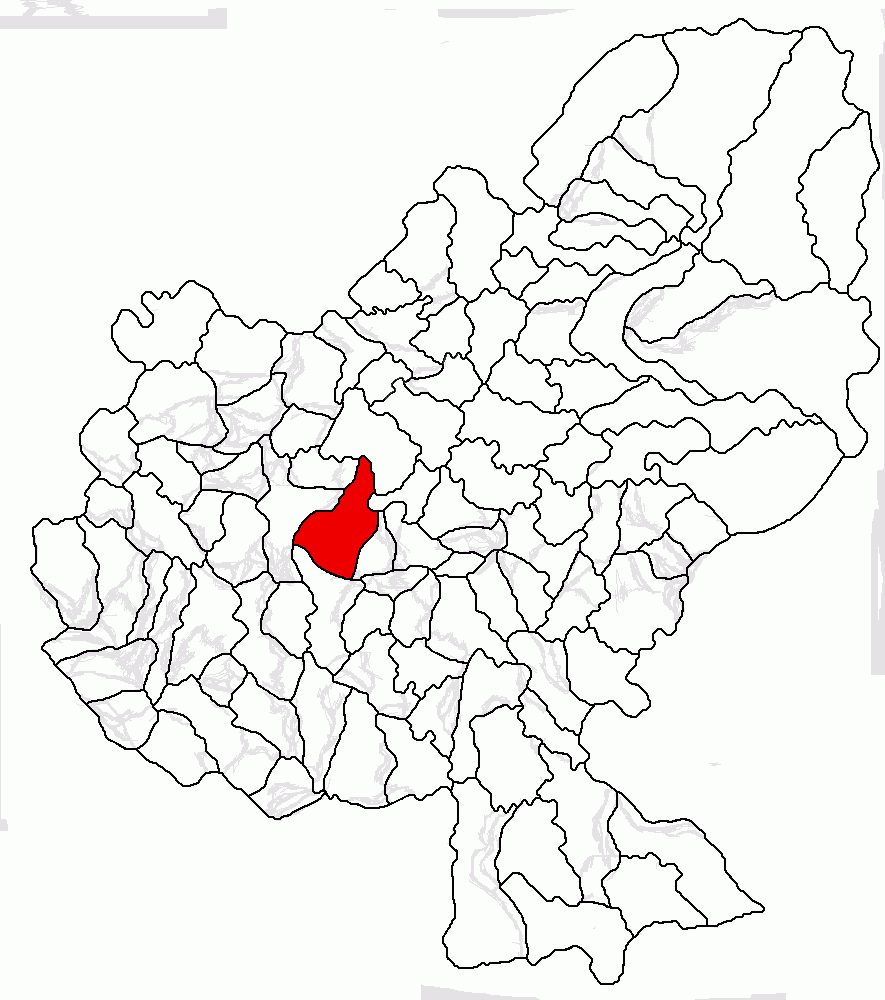
- Location in Mureș County

- Location in Romania
- Coordinates: 46°33′N 24°28′E
- Country: Romania
- County: Mureș

Government
  - Mayor (2020–2024): Előd-Barna Bodó (UDMR)
- Area: 28.03 km^{2} (10.82 sq mi)
- Elevation: 319 m (1,047 ft)
- Population (2021-12-01): 5,725
  - Density: 204.2/km^{2} (529.0/sq mi)
- Time zone: UTC+02:00 (EET)
  - Summer (DST): UTC+03:00 (EEST)
- Postal code: 547450
- Area code: (+40) 0265
- Vehicle reg.: MS
- Website: panit.ro/ro/primaria/

Pănet (Hungarian: Mezőpanit, Hungarian pronunciation: [mɛzøːpɒnit]) is a commune in Mureș County, Transylvania, Romania composed of five villages: Berghia (Mezőbergenye), Cuieșd (Székelykövesd), Hărțău (Harcó), Pănet, and Sântioana de Mureș {Csittszentiván).

== Demographics ==
The commune has an absolute Székely Hungarian majority. According to the 2011 census, it had a population of 6,033, of which 78.7% were Hungarians, 12.4% Romanians, and 8.9% Roma. At the 2021 census, Pănet had 5,725 inhabitants; of those, 71.2% were Hungarians, 18.32% Romanians, and 3.98% Roma.

== See also ==
- List of Hungarian exonyms (Mureș County)
