= Vărădia de Mureș =

- Commune
- Location in Arad County

- Location in Romania
- Coordinates: 46°01′N 22°09′E
- Country: Romania
- County: Arad
- Population (2021-12-01): 1,610
- Time zone: EET/EEST (UTC+2/+3)
- Vehicle reg.: AR

Vărădia de Mureș (colloquially Totvărădia, or "Slovak Vărădia"; Hungarian: Tótvárad; German: Waradia, Turkish: Varadiye) is a commune in Arad County, Romania. It stretches over approximately 12600 hectares, situated in the contact zone of Metaliferi Mountains and Zărandului Mountains, respectively partially in the large valley of the Mureș River. It is composed of six villages: Baia (Kisbaja), Julița (Gyulatő), Lupești (Farkasháza), Nicolae Bălcescu (Alsóköves), Stejar (Szarvaság) and Vărădia de Mureș (situated at 81 km from Arad).

== Population ==
According to the 2002 census the population of the commune counts 2112 inhabitants, out of which 98,7% are Romanians, 0,5% Hungarians, 0,7% Ukrainians and 0,1% are of other or undeclared nationalities.

== History ==
The first documentary record of Vărădia de Mureș dates back to 1369. Nicolae Bălcescu was attested documentarily in 1477, while the other villages in 1479.

== Economy ==
Agriculture is the main economic branch of the commune, olericulture and livestock-breeding are the most important activities. Lumbering and conversion of timber are also common activities among the inhabitants.

== Tourism ==
The Mureșului, Juliței and Stejarului Valleys, the mediaeval castle in Vărădia de Mureș and the wooden church in Julița dating from 1787 are the main tourist attractions of the commune.
