= Ceru-Băcăinți =

- Commune
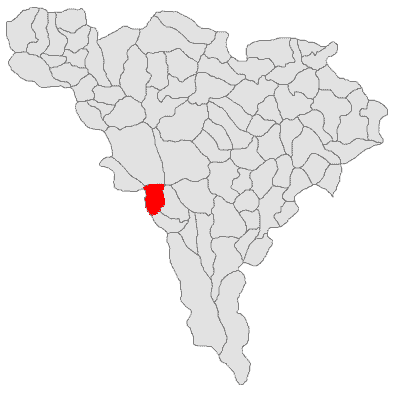
- Location in Alba County

- Location in Romania
- Coordinates: 45°59′N 23°15′E
- Country: Romania
- County: Alba

Government
  - Mayor (2020–2024): Ioan Trif (PMP)
- Area: 49.5 km^{2} (19.1 sq mi)
- Elevation: 405 m (1,329 ft)
- Population (2021-12-01): 227
  - Density: 4.6/km^{2} (12/sq mi)
- Time zone: EET/EEST (UTC+2/+3)
- Postal code: RO–517220
- Area code: (+40) 0258
- Vehicle reg.: AB
- Website: cerubacainti.ro

Ceru-Băcăinți (German: Bocksdorf; Hungarian: Bokajfelfalu) is a commune located in Alba County, Transylvania, Romania. It has a population of 227 as of 2021 and is composed of ten villages: Bolovănești, Bulbuc (Bulbuk), Ceru-Băcăinți, Cucuta, Curpeni (Kurpény), Dumbrăvița, Fântânele, Groși, Valea Mare (Váleamáre), and Viezuri (Gyézuri házcsoport).

The commune is situated in the western part of the county, on the border with Hunedoara County. It lies in the southwestern part of the Metaliferi Mountains; with an altitude of 860 m (2,820 ft), the Piatra Tomii peak dominates Bulbuc village.

Historical population
Year	Pop.	±%
1850	1,339	—
1900	1,916	+43.1%
1977	831	−56.6%
2002	376	−54.8%
2011	269	−28.5%
2021	227	−15.6%
Source: INS, Census data

At the 2021 census, the commune had a population of 227, of which 95.15% were Romanians. There has been only one birth in Ceru-Băcăinți since 2022.
