= Rușii-Munți =

- Commune
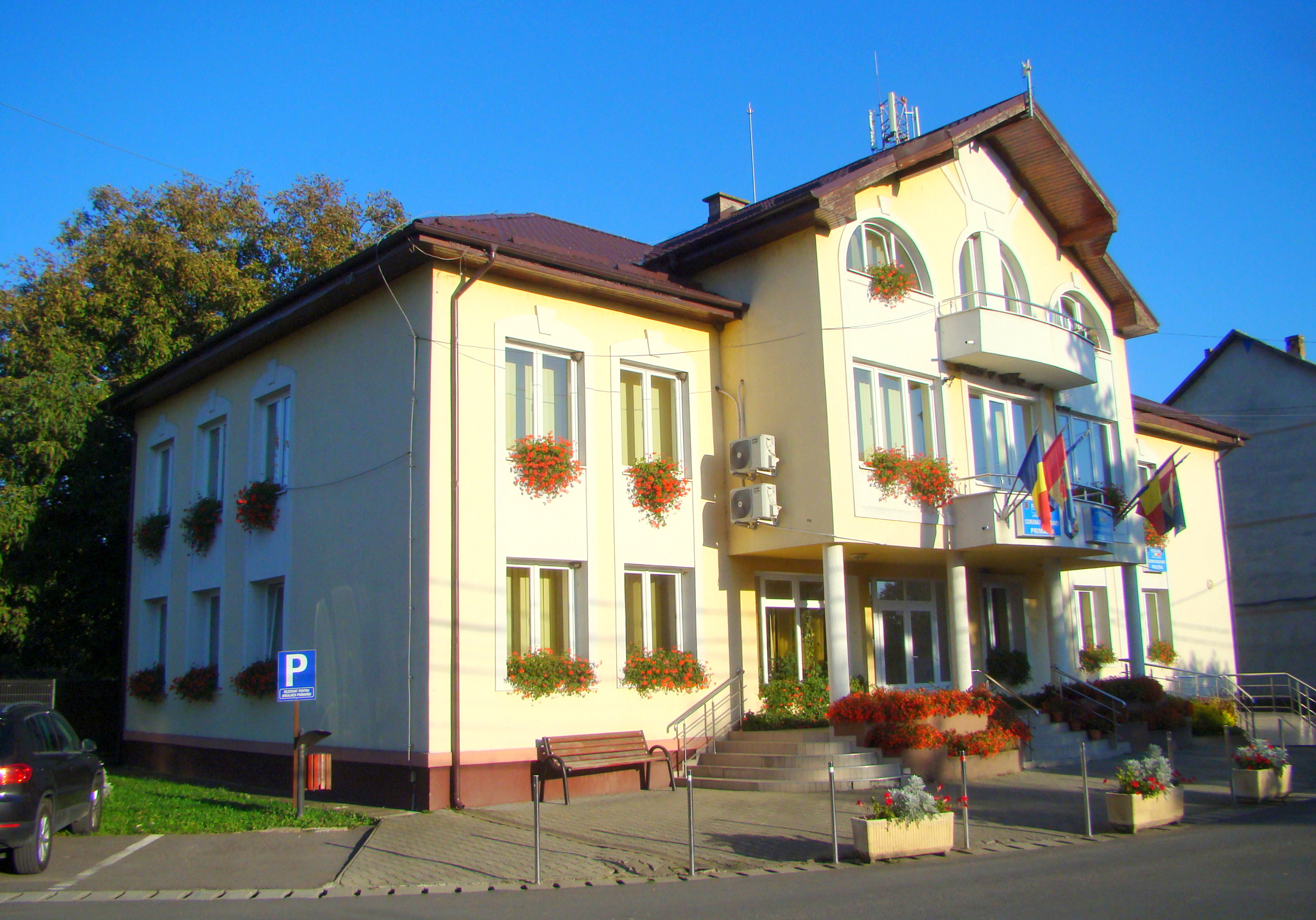
- Rușii-Munți town hall

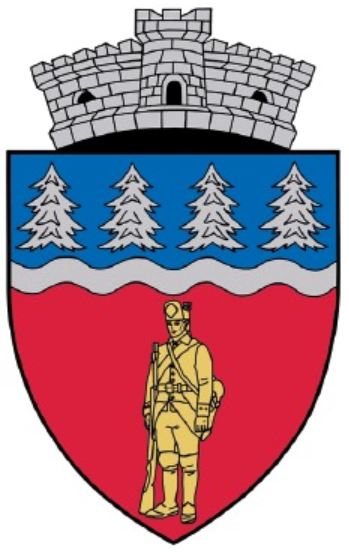
- Coat of arms

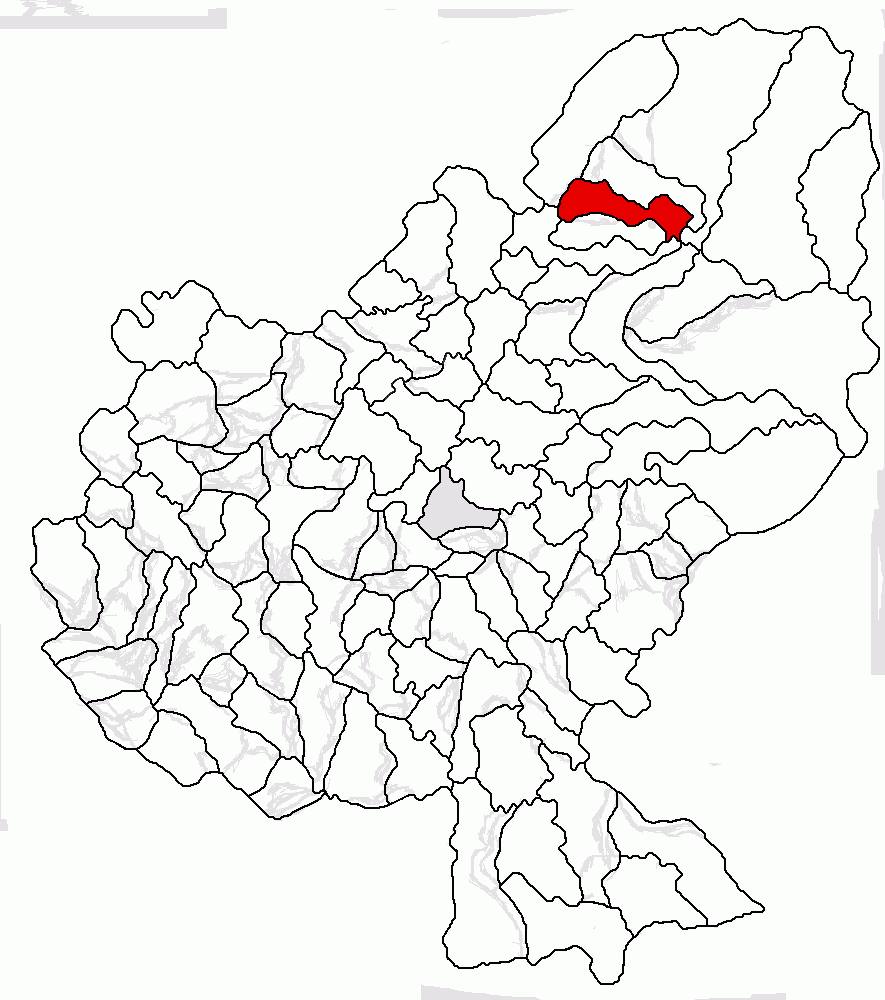
- Location in Mureș County

- Location in Romania
- Coordinates: 46.92°N 24.85°E
- Country: Romania
- County: Mureș

Government
  - Mayor (2024–2028): Ilie Chiș-Bălan (PSD)
- Area: 43.86 km^{2} (16.93 sq mi)
- Elevation: 432 m (1,417 ft)
- Population (2021-12-01): 1,827
  - Density: 41.66/km^{2} (107.9/sq mi)
- Time zone: UTC+02:00 (EET)
  - Summer (DST): UTC+03:00 (EEST)
- Postal code: 547505
- Area code: (+40) 0265
- Vehicle reg.: MS

Rușii-Munți (Hungarian: Marosoroszfalu, Hungarian pronunciation: [ˈmɒroʃorosfɒlu], meaning "Russian Village on the Mureș") is a commune in Mureș County, Transylvania, Romania that is composed of four villages: Maiorești (formerly Huduc; Monosfalu), Morăreni (Maroslaka), Rușii-Munți, and Sebeș (Sebespatak).

At the 2002 census, the commune had a population of 2,252: 95% Romanians, 4% Roma, and 1% Hungarians. At the 2021 census, Rușii-Munți had a population of 1,827; of those, 90.7% were Romanians and 2.63% Roma.

== Natives ==
- Tit Liviu Chinezu (1904–1955), bishop of the Greek-Catholic Church, beatified in 2019

== See also ==
- List of Hungarian exonyms (Mureș County)
