= Joseni =

Joseni Gyergyóalfalu
- Commune
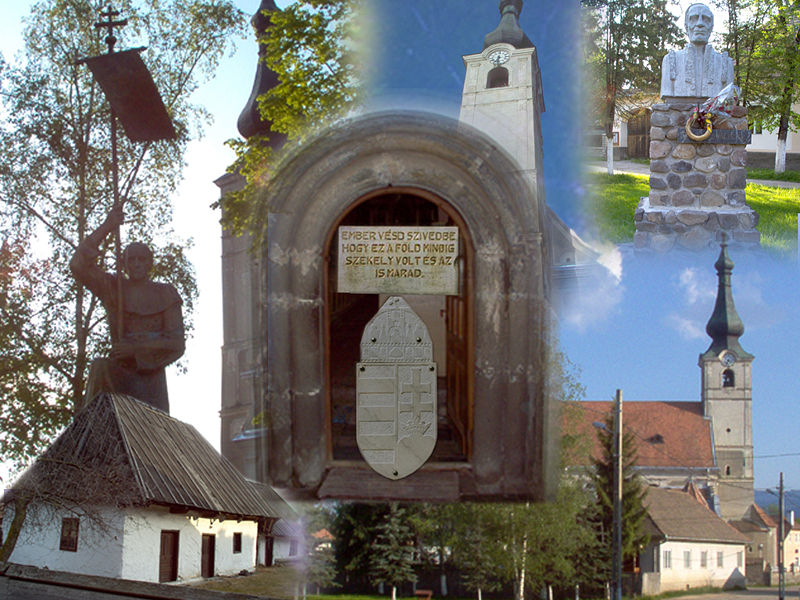

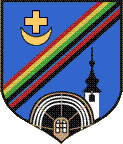
- Coat of arms

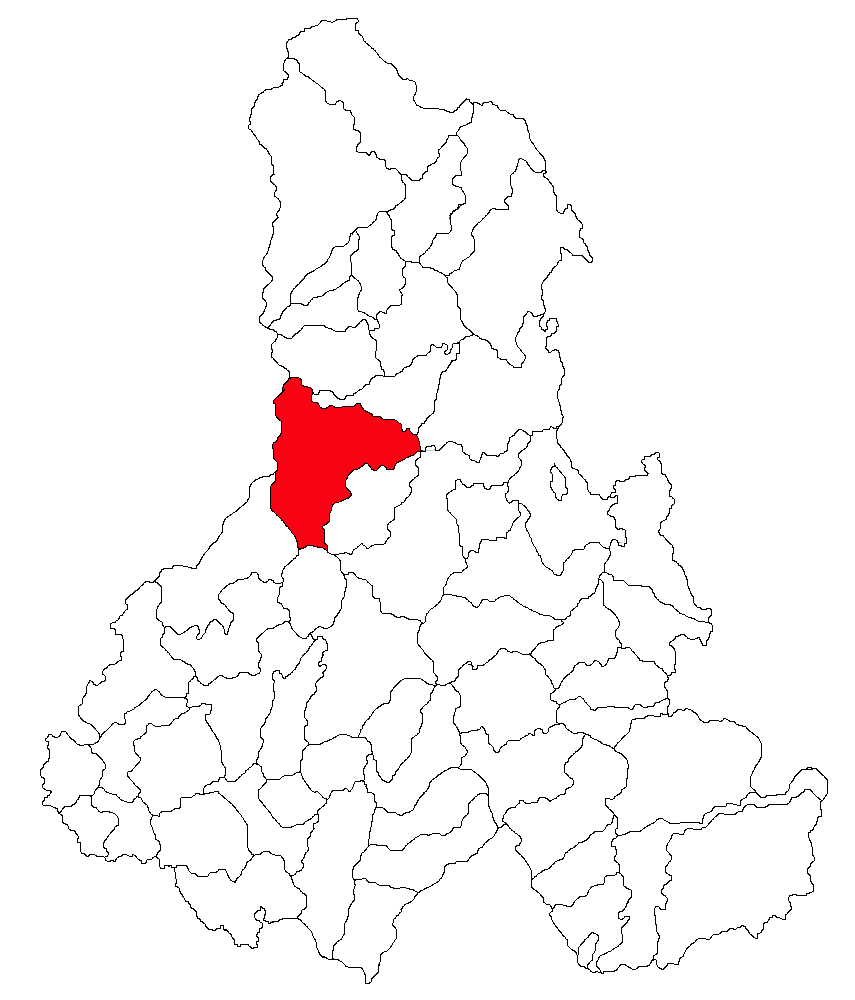
- Location in Harghita County

- Location in Romania
- Coordinates: 46°42′N 25°30′E
- Country: Romania
- County: Harghita

Government
  - Mayor (2020–2024): Szabolcs Gáll (UDMR)
- Area: 224.01 km^{2} (86.49 sq mi)
- Population (2021-12-01): 5,268
  - Density: 23.52/km^{2} (60.91/sq mi)
- Time zone: UTC+02:00 (EET)
  - Summer (DST): UTC+03:00 (EEST)
- Postal code: 537130
- Area code: +40 266
- Vehicle reg.: HR
- Website: gyergyoalfalu.ro/en

Joseni (Hungarian: Gyergyóalfalu, Hungarian pronunciation: [ɟɛrɟoːɒlfɒlu], meaning "Lower Village in Gyergyó") is a commune in Harghita County, Romania. It lies in the Székely Land, an ethno-cultural region in eastern Transylvania, and is composed of three villages:

- Borzont / Borzont
- Bucin / Bucsin
- Joseni / Gyergyóalfalu

== History ==
The first written mention of the commune is from 1567 as Alffalw. In 1614, it was recorded that Alfalu had 104 families. In 1724, it was already mentioned as Gyergyó Alfalu. Its Romanian name was Alfalău until 1919 and was derived from the Hungarian form.

In 1567, it was the local priest Stephen who mobilized the Székelys against king John Sigismund who attempted to force Roman Catholic Székelys to convert to Protestantism. In memory of the role that the village played in the Székely resistance, pilgrims from the village lead the procession on occasion of the yearly Csíksomlyó pilgrimages.

The villages belonged first to the Székely seat of Gyergyószék, which was subsequently absorbed into Csíkszék district, until the administrative reform of Transylvania in 1876, when they fell within Csík County in the Kingdom of Hungary. After the Treaty of Trianon of 1920, they became part of Romania and fell within Ciuc County during the interwar period. In 1940, the second Vienna Award granted the Northern Transylvania to Hungary and the villages were held by Hungary until 1944. After Soviet occupation, the Romanian administration returned and the commune became officially part of Romania in 1947. Between 1952 and 1960, the commune fell within the Hungarian Autonomous Province, between 1960 and 1968 the Mureș-Hungarian Autonomous Province. In 1968, the province was abolished, and since then, the commune has been part of Harghita County

== Demographics ==
The commune has an absolute Székely (Hungarian) majority. According to the 2011 census it has a population of 5,475; of which 98.17% or 5,375 are ethnic Hungarians.

== Landmarks ==
The Roman Catholic Church was built in the honour of Saint Simon the Zealot, Saint Judas Thaddaeus and Margaret the Virgin. It probably dates to the 13th century as its stone gate bears the number 1213. At the right hand-side from its entrance, a flagpole base can be seen which was raised in 1942 by villagers living in Budapest.

Its inscriptions reads: Man, think in thy heart that this land has always been and always will be Székely Land.

In the church garden, the monument for World War I and World War II heroes and the statue of priest Stephen can be found.

== Climate ==
Climate data for Joseni (altitude 749m, 2014-2026 normals, extremes 1981-present)
Month	Jan	Feb	Mar	Apr	May	Jun	Jul	Aug	Sep	Oct	Nov	Dec	Year
Record high °C (°F)	13.4 (56.1)	16.8 (62.2)	23.5 (74.3)	26.3 (79.3)	29.8 (85.6)	33.5 (92.3)	35.0 (95.0)	35.7 (96.3)	32.9 (91.2)	25.8 (78.4)	24.0 (75.2)	15.6 (60.1)	35.7 (96.3)
Mean daily maximum °C (°F)	−0.2 (31.6)	3.1 (37.6)	8.9 (48.0)	14.0 (57.2)	18.5 (65.3)	23.7 (74.7)	25.4 (77.7)	26.0 (78.8)	20.7 (69.3)	14.4 (57.9)	6.9 (44.4)	1.8 (35.2)	13.6 (56.5)
Daily mean °C (°F)	−4.1 (24.6)	−1.6 (29.1)	3.1 (37.6)	7.2 (45.0)	11.9 (53.4)	16.8 (62.2)	18.1 (64.6)	18.0 (64.4)	13.5 (56.3)	7.9 (46.2)	2.8 (37.0)	−1.1 (30.0)	7.7 (45.9)
Mean daily minimum °C (°F)	−7.9 (17.8)	−6.2 (20.8)	−2.7 (27.1)	0.4 (32.7)	5.3 (41.5)	9.9 (49.8)	10.7 (51.3)	9.9 (49.8)	6.3 (43.3)	1.5 (34.7)	−1.3 (29.7)	−4.1 (24.6)	1.8 (35.3)
Record low °C (°F)	−38.0 (−36.4)	−35.0 (−31.0)	−25.0 (−13.0)	−13.4 (7.9)	−6.5 (20.3)	−0.6 (30.9)	0.5 (32.9)	−0.2 (31.6)	−6.7 (19.9)	−15.0 (5.0)	−28.3 (−18.9)	−29.5 (−21.1)	−38.0 (−36.4)
Average precipitation mm (inches)	19.8 (0.78)	23.5 (0.93)	29.7 (1.17)	39.5 (1.56)	75.0 (2.95)	99.5 (3.92)	78.2 (3.08)	59.5 (2.34)	52.5 (2.07)	35.2 (1.39)	32.7 (1.29)	23.9 (0.94)	569 (22.42)
Average precipitation days (≥ 1.0 mm)	5.3	5.5	5.7	7.2	10.9	11.9	10.1	7.2	7.3	6.2	6.3	5.2	88.8
Average snowy days	9.8	7.5	4.6	2.8	0	0	0	0	0	0	3.1	7.1	34.9
Source: Meteomanz (2014-2026); Infoclimat (1980-2010)

== Twinnings ==
The commune is twinned with:

- Balatonszárszó, Hungary
- Türje, Hungary
- Fadd, Hungary
- Ada, Serbia, Vojvodina
