= Perșani Mountains =

Mountain range in Romania

Coordinates: 45°51′35″N 25°26′22″E

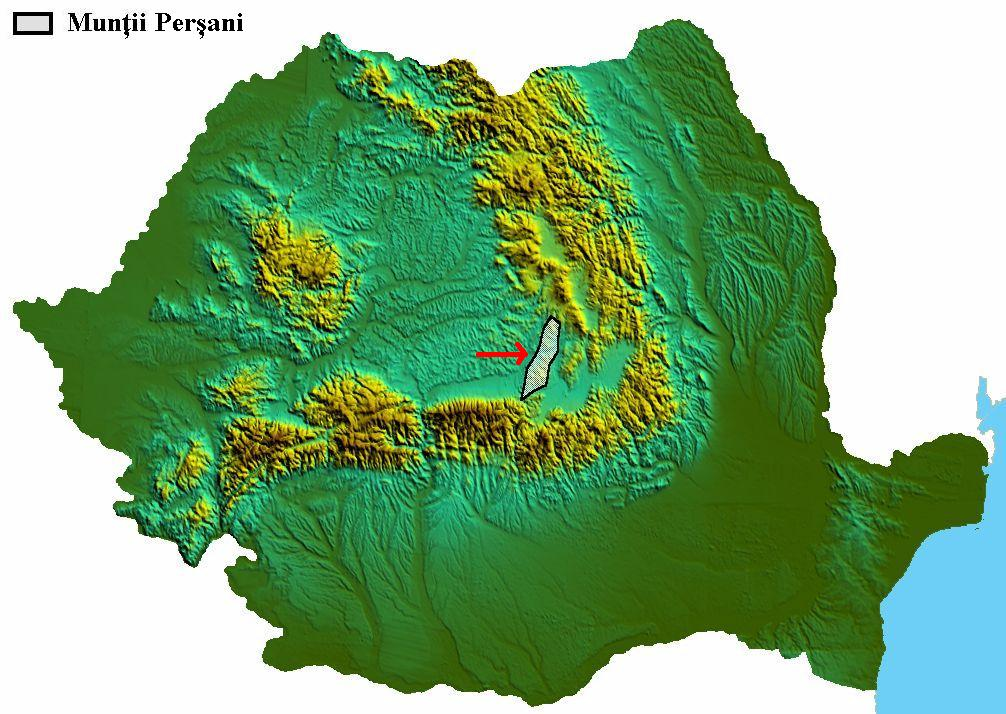
Location of the Perșani Mountains in Romania

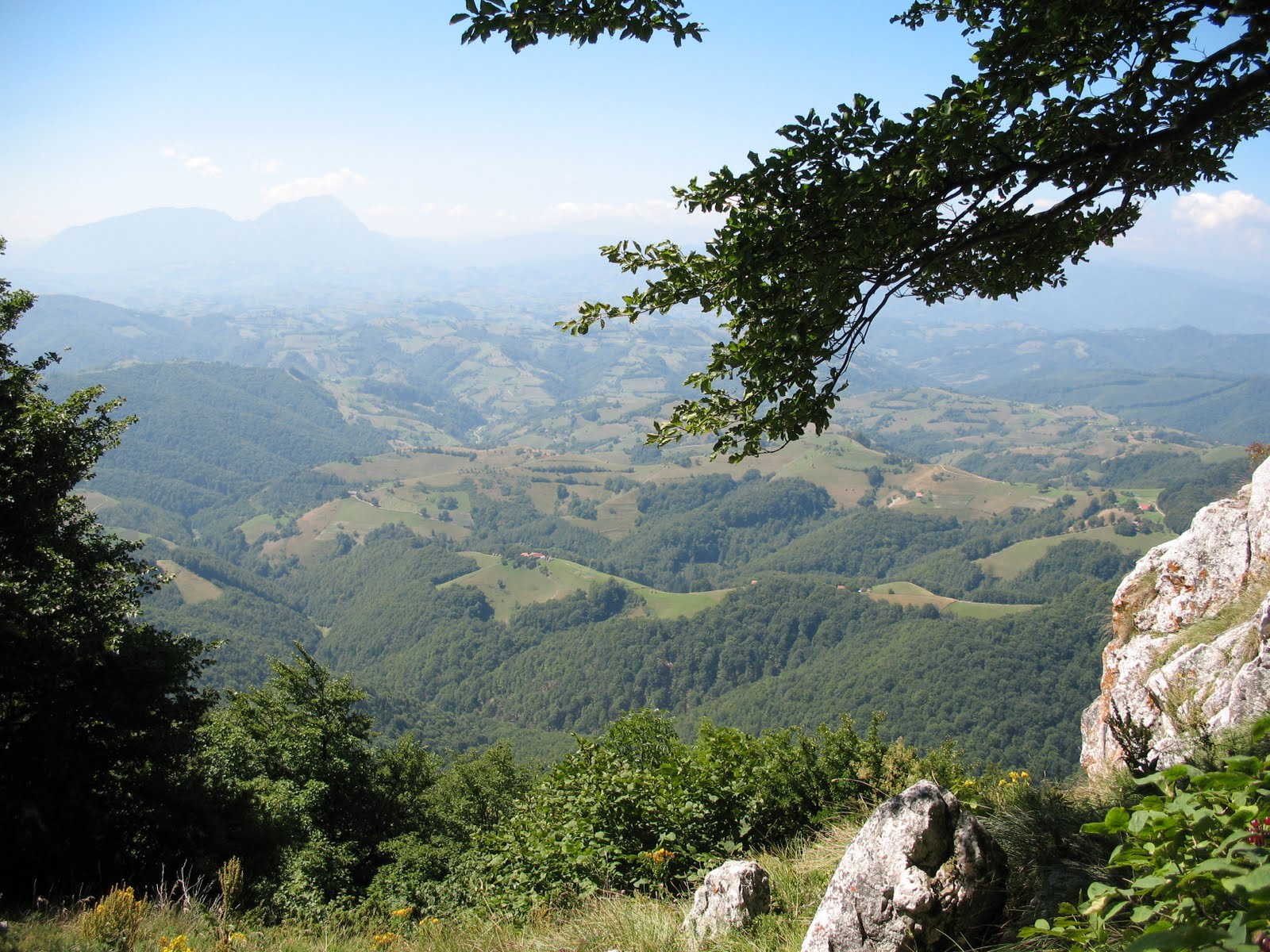
View from Măgura Codlei towards Holbav

The Perșani Mountains (Romanian: Munții Perșani; Hungarian: Persányi-hegység) is a mountain range in central Romania. The highest peak is Măgura Codlei Peak, with an elevation of 1,292 metres (4,239 ft).

Geologically, the Perșani Mountains are part of the Căliman-Harghita Mountains of the Inner Eastern Carpathians. Within Romania, however, it is traditional to divide the Eastern Carpathians in Romanian territory into three geographical groups (north, center, south), instead. The Romanian categorization includes the Perșani Mountains within the central Carpathians of Moldavia and Transylvania (Munții Carpați Moldo-Transilvani), which also comprise the Baraolt Mountains, the Bârgău Mountains, the Călimani Mountains, the Ciuc Mountains, the Gurghiu Mountains, and the Harghita Mountains.

The main ridge runs in a north–south direction and has a length of 60 kilometres (37 mi). The Perșani Mountains consists mainly of basalt, shale, and flysch. It is mostly forested, and for the most part the elevations are rounded. The geologic diversity of the rock results in interesting natural phenomena (basalt formations, caves, canyons).
