= Gurghiu =

Gurghiu may refer to several places in Romania:

- Gurghiu (river), a river in Mureș County
- Gurghiu Mountains
- Gurghiu, Mureș, a commune in Mureș County
