= Tireu =

- Location within Romania

Location
- Country: Romania
- Counties: Mureș County
- Villages: Arșița

Physical characteristics
- Mouth: Gurghiu
  - coordinates: 46.7658°N 24.9884°E
- Length: 16 km (9.9 mi)
- Basin size: 31 km^{2} (12 sq mi)

Basin features
- Progression: Gurghiu→ Mureș→ Tisza→ Danube→ Black Sea

The Tireu is a right tributary of the river Gurghiu in Romania. It flows into the Gurghiu in the village Tireu. Its length is 16 km (9.9 mi) and its basin size is 31 km^{2} (12 sq mi).
