= Beica (disambiguation) =

Beica may refer to the following places:

- Beica or Begi, a town in south-western Ethiopia
- Beica de Jos, a commune in Mureș County, Romania
- Beica de Sus, a village in the commune Beica de Jos in Mureș County, Romania
- Beica (Mureș), a tributary of the Mureș in Mureș County, Romania
- Beica (Olt), a tributary of the Olt in Olt County, Romania
