= Nadasa =

Nadasa may refer to:

- a village in the former princely Katosan State, in Mahi Kantha, now in Gujarat, India, It is in Mehsana taluka and Mehsana District.

The PIN code number for Nadasa village is 384410. The human population in Nadasa village is about 3500 of all castes.

- Nadășa, a river in Mureș County, Romania
- Nadășa (in Hungarian: Görgénynádas), a village in Beica de Jos Commune, Mureș County, Romania
