= Jabenița mine =

Salt mine in Romania

Jabeniţa mine
- Location: Solovăstru, Mureș County, Romania
- Products: Sodium chloride
- Company: Salrom

The Jabeniţa mine is a large salt mine located in central Romania in Mureș County, close to Solovăstru. Jabenița represents one of the largest salt reserves in Romania having estimated reserves of 77 billion tonnes of NaCl.
