= Gurghiu (river) =

Gurghiu Görgény, Rosengraben
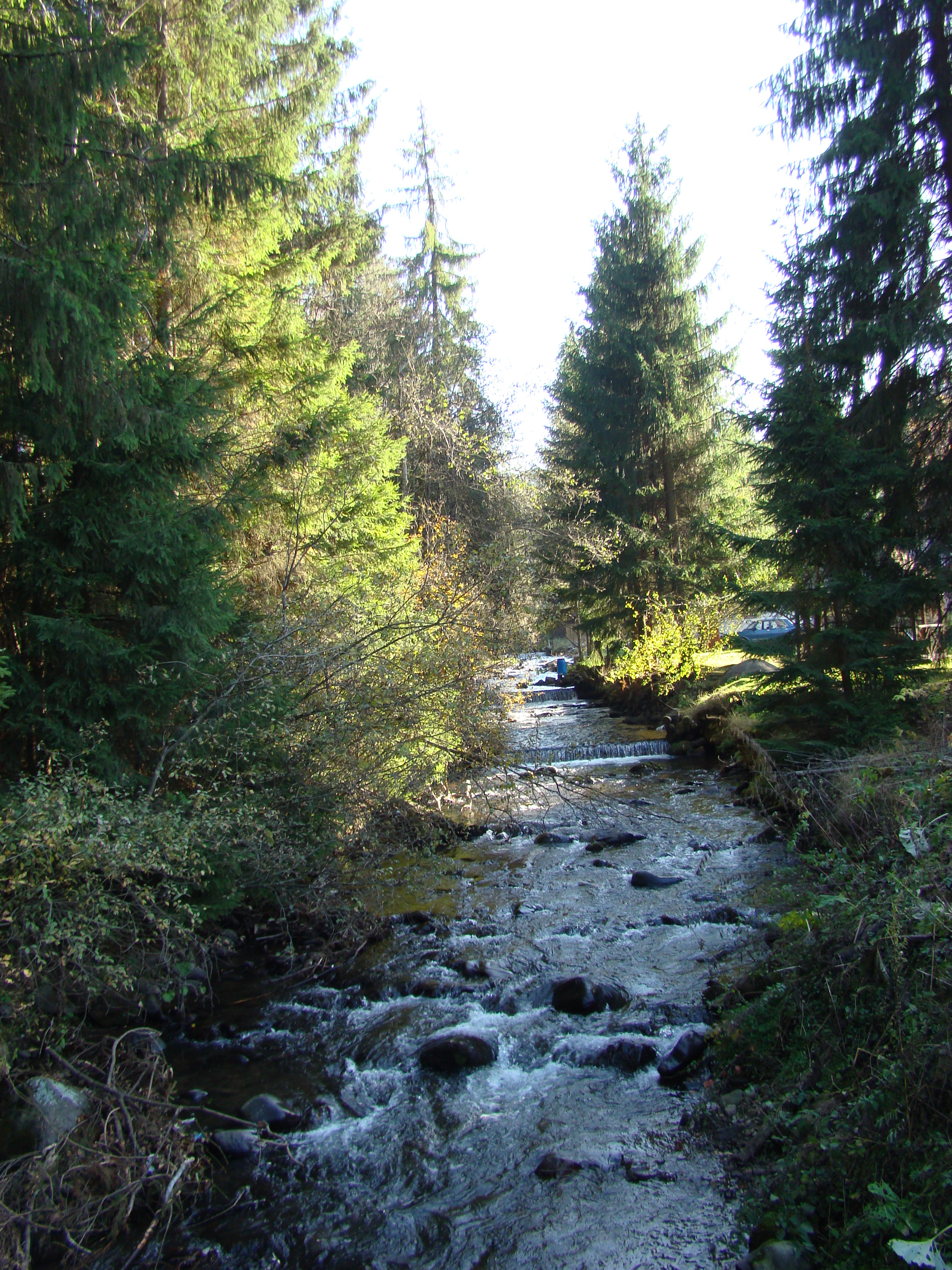

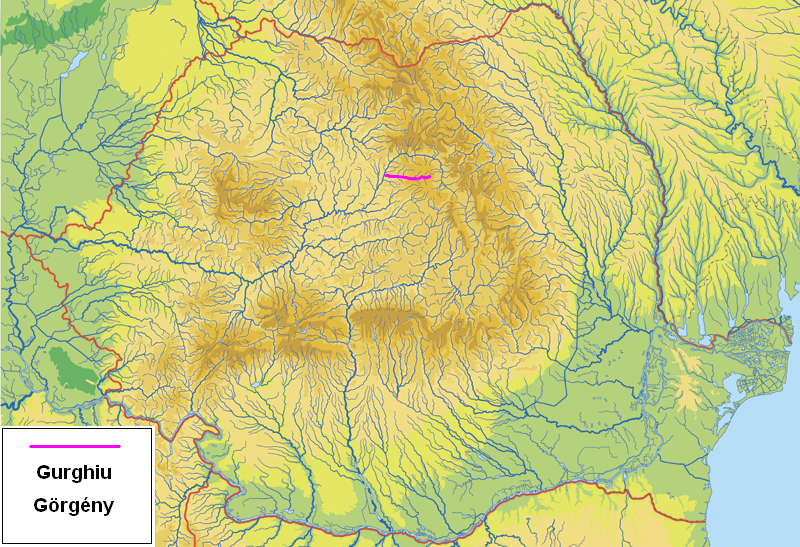

Location
- Country: Romania
- Counties: Mureș County
- Municipalities: Ibăneşti, Gurghiu, Reghin

Physical characteristics
- Source: Gurghiu Mountains
  - elevation: 1,200 m (3,900 ft)
- Mouth: Mureș
  - location: Reghin
  - coordinates: 46.7928°N 24.7239°E
- Length: 53 km (33 mi)
- Basin size: 563 km^{2} (217 sq mi)

Basin features
- Progression: Mureș→ Tisza→ Danube→ Black Sea
- Tributaries
  - left: Secuș, Orșova
  - right: Fâncel, Isticeu, Cașva

The Gurghiu (Hungarian: Görgény-patak, German: Rosengraben) is a river in the Gurghiu Mountains, Mureș County, northern Romania. It is a left tributary of the river Mureș. It flows through the municipalities Ibănești, Hodac, Gurghiu, and Solovăstru, and joins the Mureș in the city of Reghin. Its length is 53 km (33 mi) and its basin size is 563 km^{2} (217 sq mi).

== Tributaries ==
The following rivers are tributaries to the river Gurghiu (from source to mouth):

- Left: Secuș, Sebeș, Șirod, and Orșova
- Right: Lăpușna, Neagra, Fâncel, Tisieu, Tireu, Isticeu, and Cașva
