= Cașva =

- Location within Romania

Location
- Country: Romania
- Counties: Mureș County

Physical characteristics
- Mouth: Gurghiu
  - location: Cașva
  - coordinates: 46.7785°N 24.8753°E
- Length: 18 km (11 mi)
- Basin size: 60 km^{2} (23 sq mi)

Basin features
- Progression: Gurghiu→ Mureș→ Tisza→ Danube→ Black Sea

The Cașva is a right tributary of the Gurghiu river in Transylvania, Romania. It discharges into the Gurghiu in the village of Cașva. Its length is 18 km (11 mi) and its basin size is 60 km^{2} (23 sq mi).
