= Isticeu =

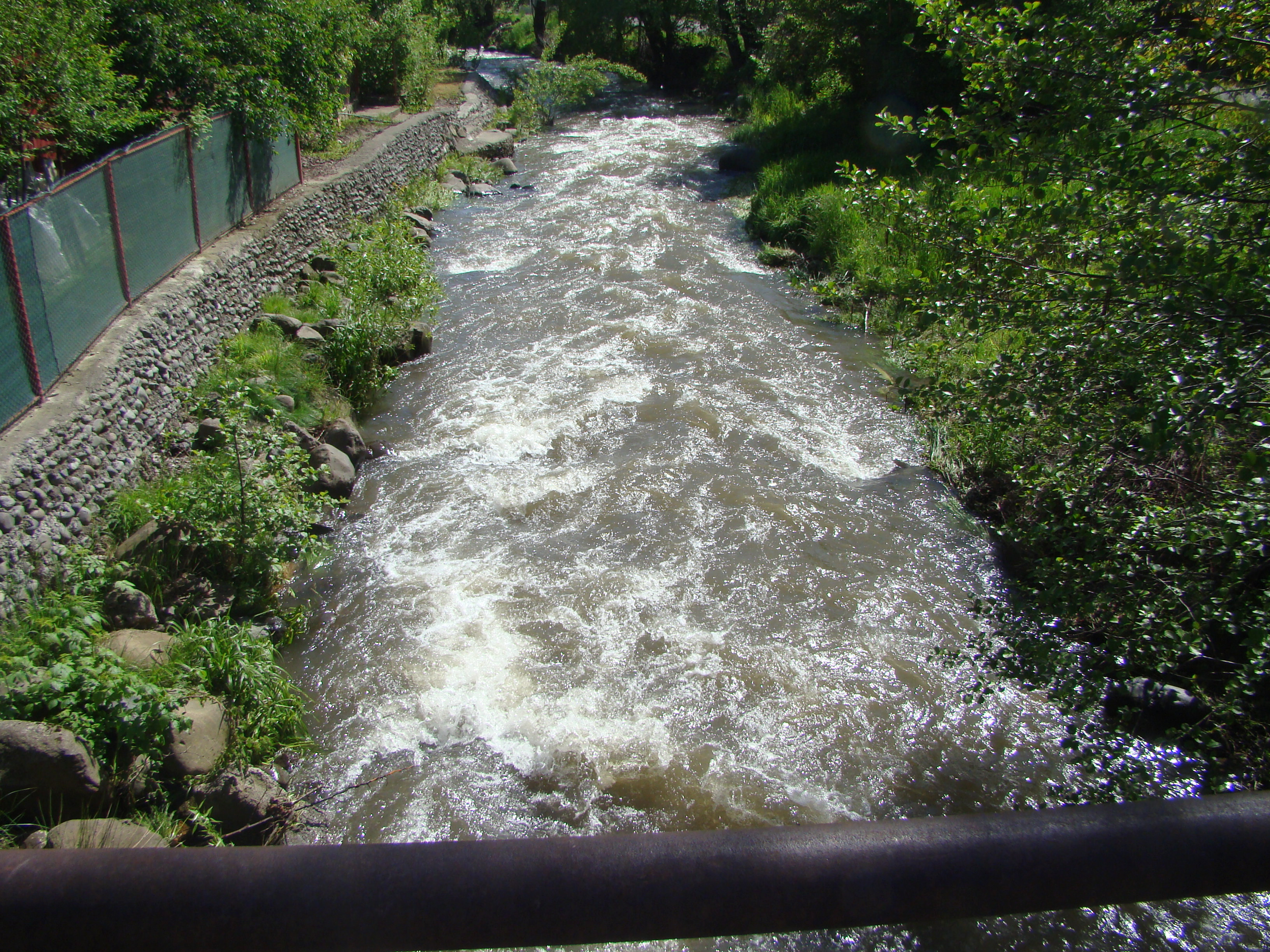

- Location within Romania

Location
- Country: Romania
- Counties: Mureș County
- Villages: Toaca

Physical characteristics
- Mouth: Gurghiu
  - location: Ibănești
  - coordinates: 46.7713°N 24.9460°E
- Length: 18 km (11 mi)
- Basin size: 68 km^{2} (26 sq mi)

Basin features
- Progression: Gurghiu→ Mureș→ Tisza→ Danube→ Black Sea
- Tributaries
  - right: Cracul Crucii

The Isticeu is a right tributary of the river Gurghiu in Transylvania, Romania. It discharges into the Gurghiu in Ibănești. Its length is 18 km (11 mi) and its basin size is 68 km^{2} (26 sq mi).
