= Hodac =

- Commune
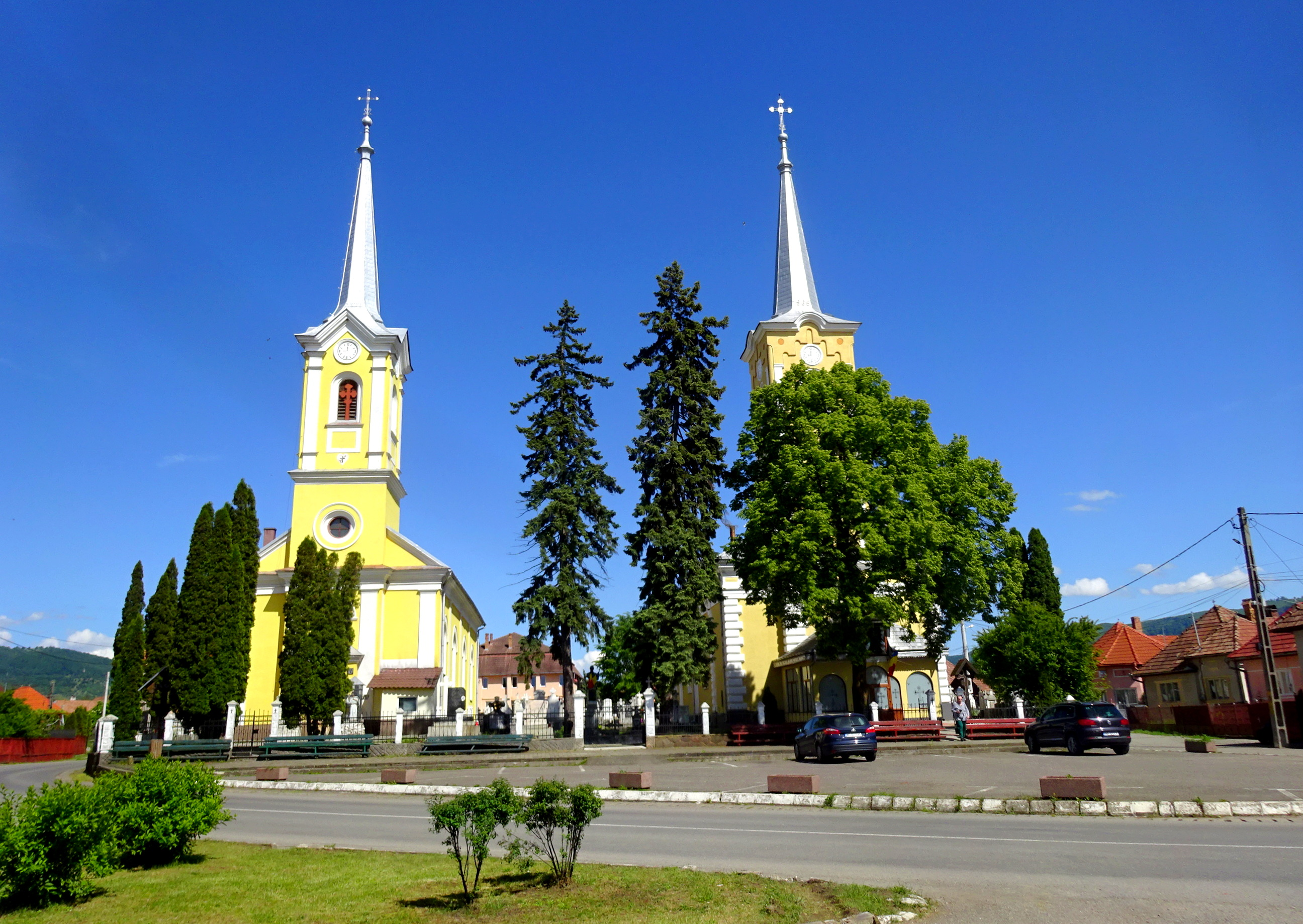
- Churches in Hodac

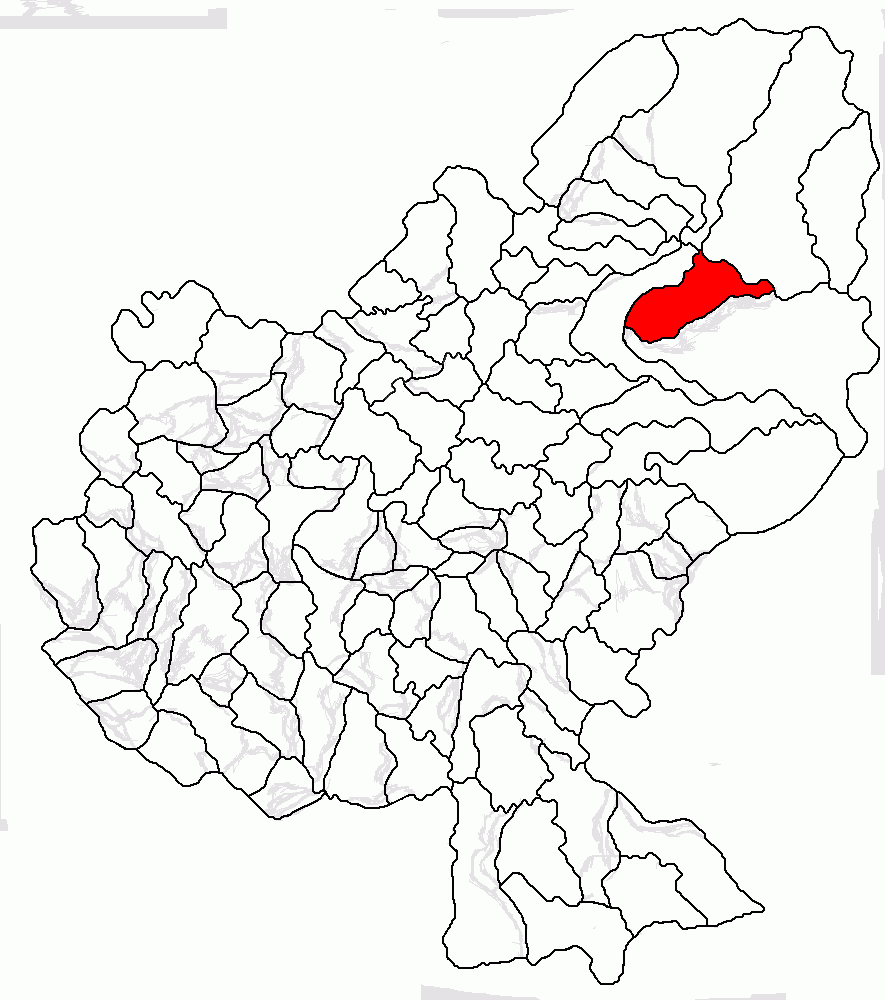
- Location in Mureș County

- Location in Romania
- Coordinates: 46°46′N 24°55′E
- Country: Romania
- County: Mureș

Government
  - Mayor (2024–2028): Valentin Marin Iacob (PNL)
- Area: 97.68 km^{2} (37.71 sq mi)
- Elevation: 650 m (2,130 ft)
- Population (2021-12-01): 4,942
  - Density: 50.59/km^{2} (131.0/sq mi)
- Time zone: UTC+02:00 (EET)
  - Summer (DST): UTC+03:00 (EEST)
- Postal code: 547310
- Area code: +40 x59
- Vehicle reg.: MS
- Website: www.hodac.ro

Hodac (Hungarian: Görgényhodák, Hungarian pronunciation: [ˈɡørɡeːɲhodaːk]) is a commune in Mureș County, Transylvania, Romania. It is composed of seven villages: Arșița (Ársica), Bicașu (Bikás), Dubiștea de Pădure (Erdődubiste), Hodac, Mirigioaia (Mirigalja), Toaca (Toka), and Uricea (Uricse).

The commune lies on the banks of the Gurghiu River. It is situated at an altitude of 650 to 700 metres (2,130 to 2,300 ft), at the foot of the Gurghiu Mountains. Hodac is located in the northeastern part of the county, 18 km (11 mi) east of the nearest city, Reghin, and 48 km (30 mi) from the county seat, Târgu Mureș. It neighbors the following communes: Ibănești to the south and east, Lunca Bradului to the north, and Gurghiu to the west.

The route of the Via Transilvanica long-distance trail passes through the villages of Mirigioaia, Bicașu, Toaca, and Dubiștea de Pădure.

At the 2021 census, Hodac had a population of 4,942, of which 97.25% were ethnic Romanians.

== Natives ==
- Nicolae Pop (born 1951), volleyball player

== See also ==
- List of Hungarian exonyms (Mureș County)
