= Fâncel =

- Location within Romania

Location
- Country: Romania
- Counties: Mureș County

Physical characteristics
- Mouth: Gurghiu
  - coordinates: 46.7514°N 25.0839°E
- Length: 17 km (11 mi)
- Basin size: 45 km^{2} (17 sq mi)

Basin features
- Progression: Gurghiu→ Mureș→ Tisza→ Danube→ Black Sea

The Fâncel is a right tributary of the river Gurghiu in Transylvania, Romania. It discharges into the Gurghiu near Brădețelu. Its length is 17 km (11 mi) and its basin size is 45 km^{2} (17 sq mi).
