= Solovăstru =

- Commune
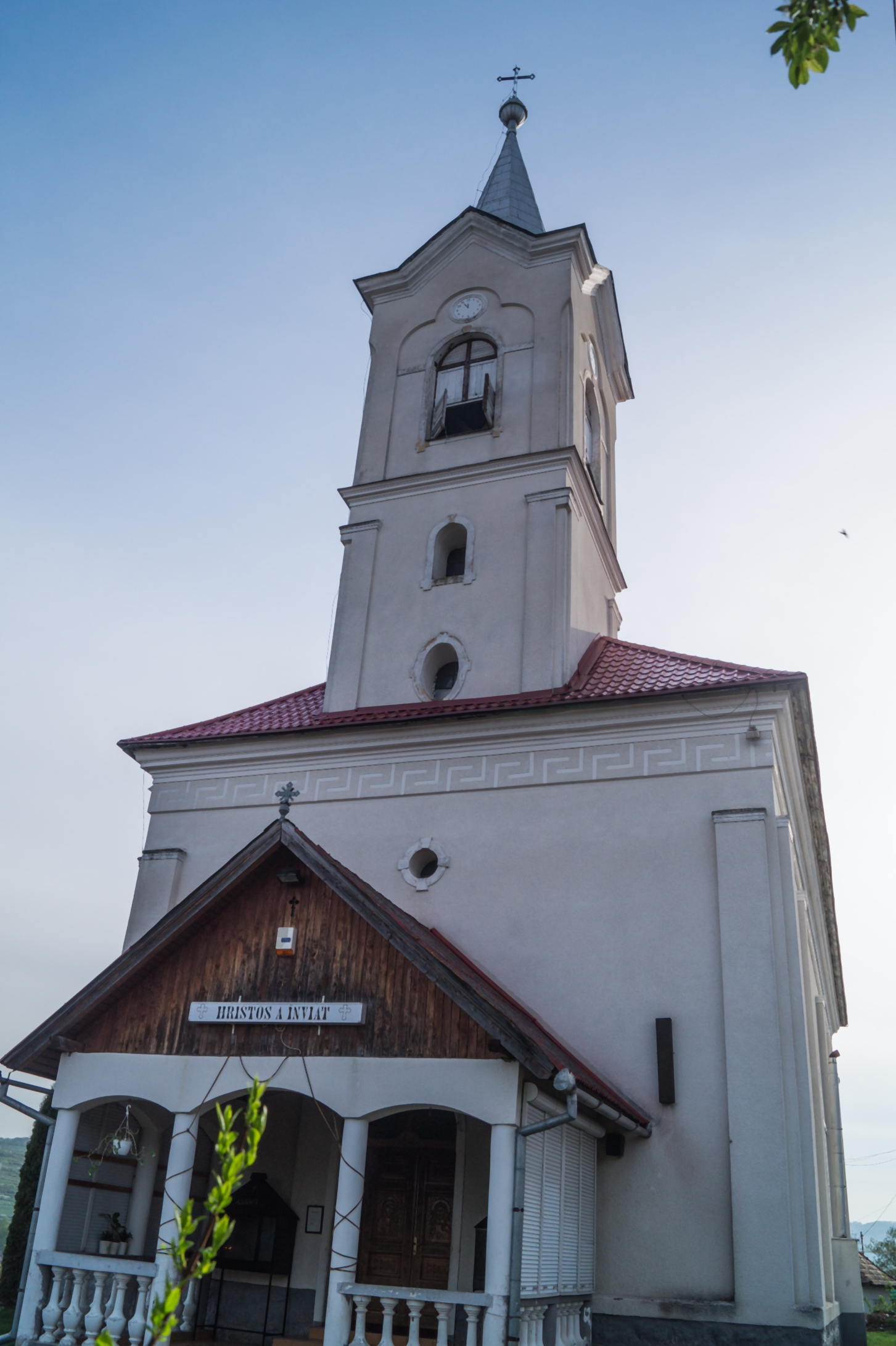
- Orthodox church in Solovăstru

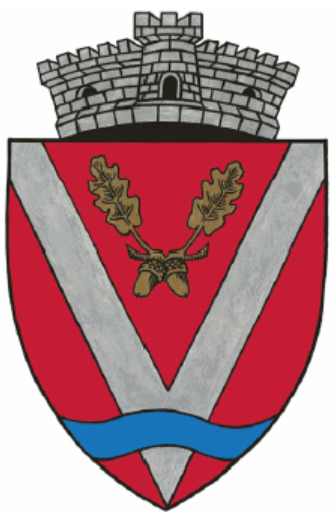
- Coat of arms

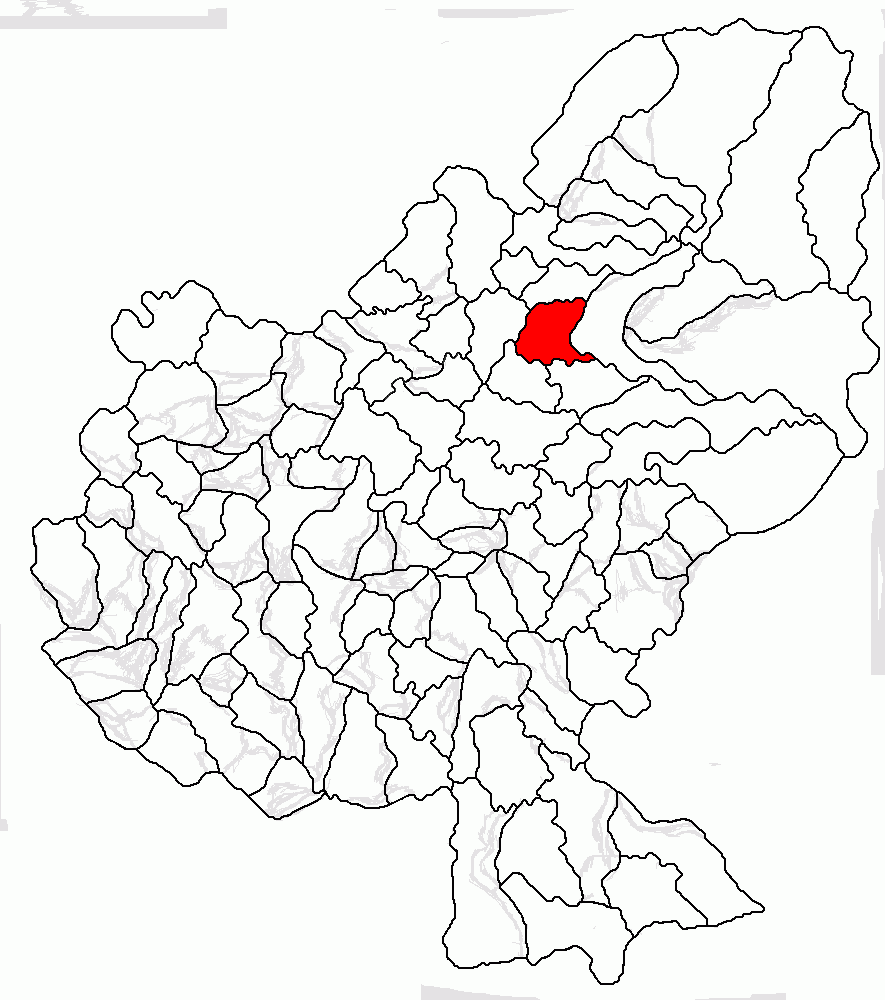
- Location in Mureș County

- Location in Romania
- Coordinates: 46°46′N 24°46′E
- Country: Romania
- County: Mureș

Government
  - Mayor (2020–2024): Chirilă-Ilie Tătar (Ind.)
- Area: 29.85 km^{2} (11.53 sq mi)
- Elevation: 399 m (1,309 ft)
- Population (2021-12-01): 3,205
  - Density: 107.4/km^{2} (278.1/sq mi)
- Time zone: UTC+02:00 (EET)
  - Summer (DST): UTC+03:00 (EEST)
- Postal code: 547570
- Area code: (+40) 0265
- Vehicle reg.: MS
- Website: www.solovastru.ro

Solovăstru (Hungarian: Görgényoroszfalu, Hungarian pronunciation: [ˈɡørɡeːɲorosfɒlu]) is a commune in Mureș County, Transylvania, Romania that is composed of two villages, Jabenița (Görgénysóakna) and Solovăstru.

The commune is located in the north-central part of the county, on the left bank of the Mureș River, just east of Reghin, and 36 km (22 mi) north of the county seat, Târgu Mureș. It is traversed east to west by the Gurghiu River, an affluent of the Mureș. It is surrounded to the east by Gurghiu commune, to the west by the city of Reghin, to the south by Beica de Jos commune, and to the north by Ideciu de Jos commune.

As of the 2011 census, Solovăstru had a population of 2,888, of which 85% were Romanians and 10.6% Roma. At the 2021 census, the commune had a population of 3,205; of those, 86.27% were Romanians, 8.21% Roma, and 1.75% Hungarians.

== Natives ==
- Virginia Zeani (1925 – 2023), opera singer

== See also ==
- List of Hungarian exonyms (Mureș County)
