= Căliman-Harghita Mountains =

Mountain range group in Romania

Coordinates: 47.1164°N 25.0500°E

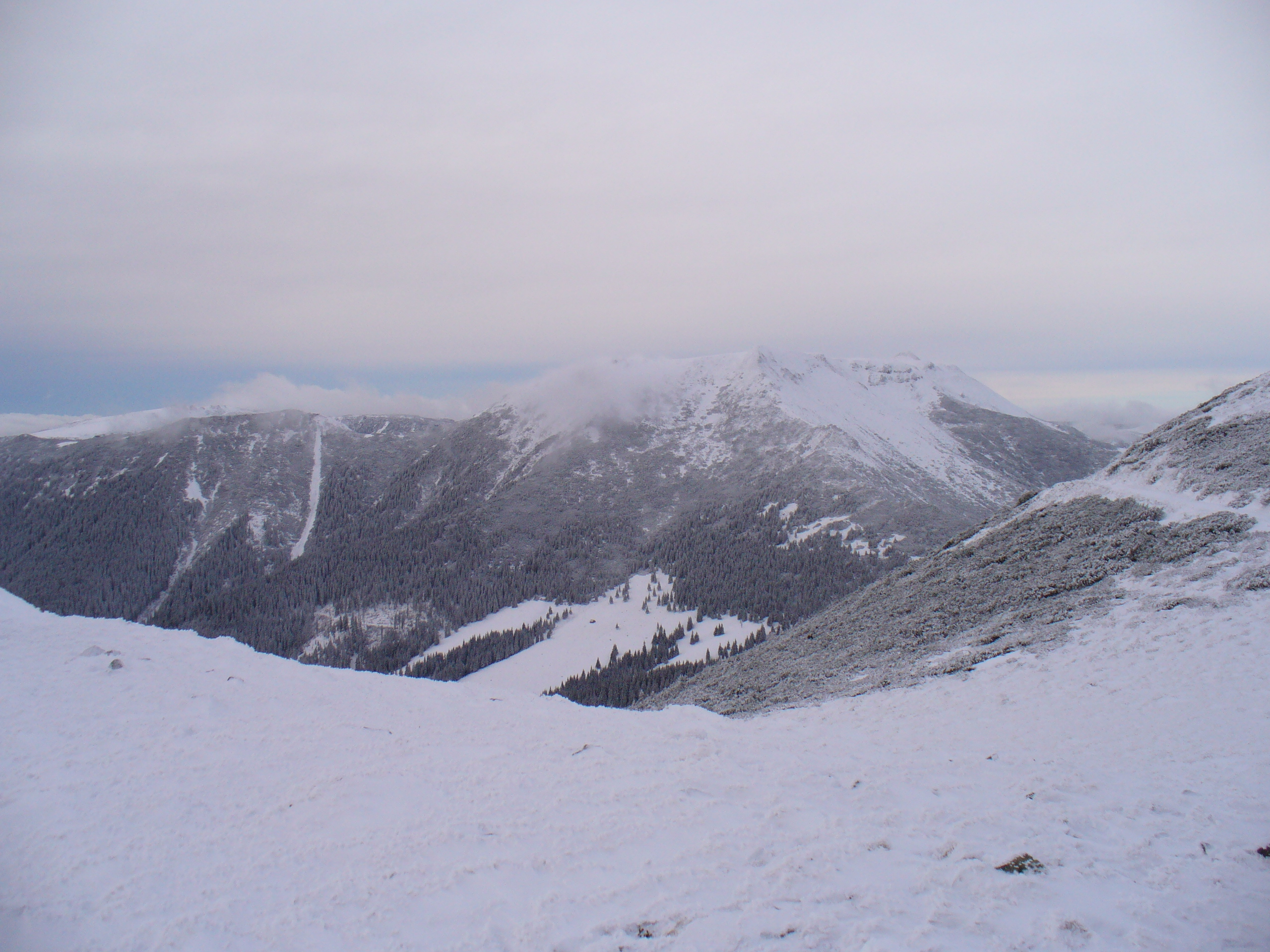
Pietrosu Peak, Călimani Mountains, Romania

The Căliman-Harghita Mountains (in Romanian, Munții Căliman-Harghita) are a group of mountain ranges in Romania.

These ranges are considered part of the Inner Eastern Carpathians. Within Romania, however, it is traditional to divide the Eastern Carpathians (Carpații Orientali) into three geographical groups (north, center, south), instead in Outer and Inner Eastern Carpathians. The Romanian categorization includes all of the Căliman-Harghita Mountains within the central Eastern Carpathians of Moldavia and Transylvania (Munţii Carpați Moldo-Transilvani).

The Moldavian-Transylvanian Carpathians include:

- Bârgău Mountains (Munții Bârgăului)
- Călimani Mountains (Munții Călimani), also known as the Kelemen Alps
- Ciuc Mountains (Munții Ciucului)
- Gurghiu Mountains (Munții Gurghiului), also known as the Görgeny Alps
- Harghita Mountains (Munții Harghita), the "largest volcanic body in the whole of Europe"
- Baraolt Mountains (Munții Baraolt)
- Perșani Mountains (Munții Perșani)

== See also ==
- Romanian Carpathians
