= Orșova (river) =

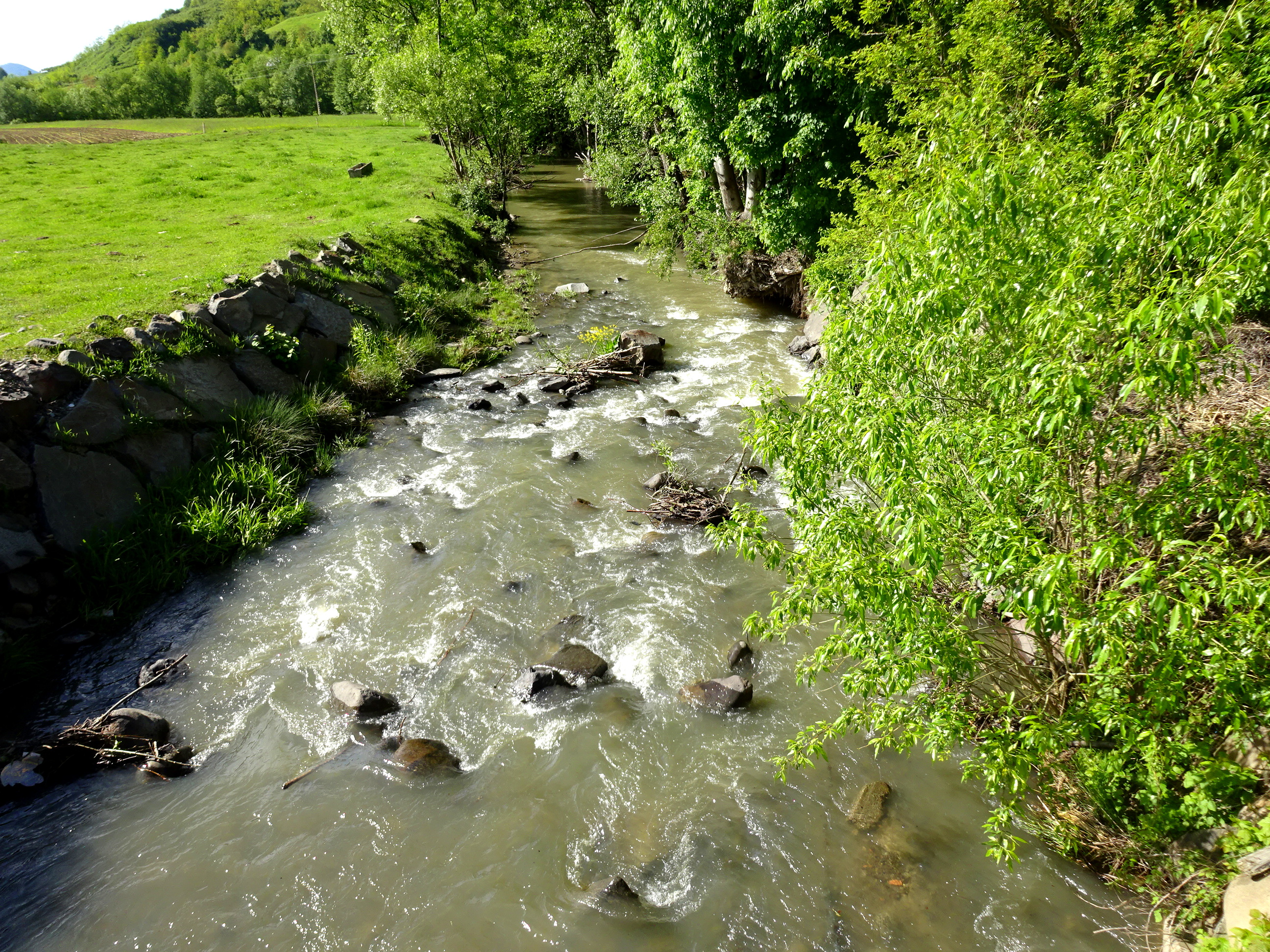

- Location within Romania

Location
- Country: Romania
- Counties: Mureș County
- Villages: Orșova-Pădure, Orșova

Physical characteristics
- Mouth: Gurghiu
  - coordinates: 46.7765°N 24.8706°E
- Length: 16 km (9.9 mi)
- Basin size: 27 km^{2} (10 sq mi)

Basin features
- Progression: Gurghiu→ Mureș→ Tisza→ Danube→ Black Sea

The Orșova is a left tributary of the river Gurghiu in Romania. It flows into the Gurghiu near the village Gurghiu. Its length is 16 km (9.9 mi) and its basin size is 27 km^{2} (10 sq mi).
