= Amza Peak =

Highest peak in the Southern Gurghiu Mountains

Coordinates: 46°36′11″N 25°28′48″E

Amza Peak (Romanian: Vârful Amza; Hungarian: Csomafalvi-Dél-hegy), in Harghita County, Romania, is the highest peak in the Southern Gurghiu Mountains. Its elevation is 1,695 m (5,561 ft). It is part of the rim of an extinct volcanic crater.

The river Șumuleul Mare has its source at the base of Amza Peak, at an altitude of 1,349 m (4,426 ft).
