= Szentmihály =

Szentmihály is the Hungarian name for three places in Romania:

- Mihai Viteazu Commune, Cluj County
- Mihăileni Commune, Harghita County (colloquial)
- Sânmihai de Pădure village, Beica de Jos Commune, Mureș County

It is also the name of a former village in Hungary, merged into the present day town of Tiszavasvári
