= Chiheru de Jos =

- Commune
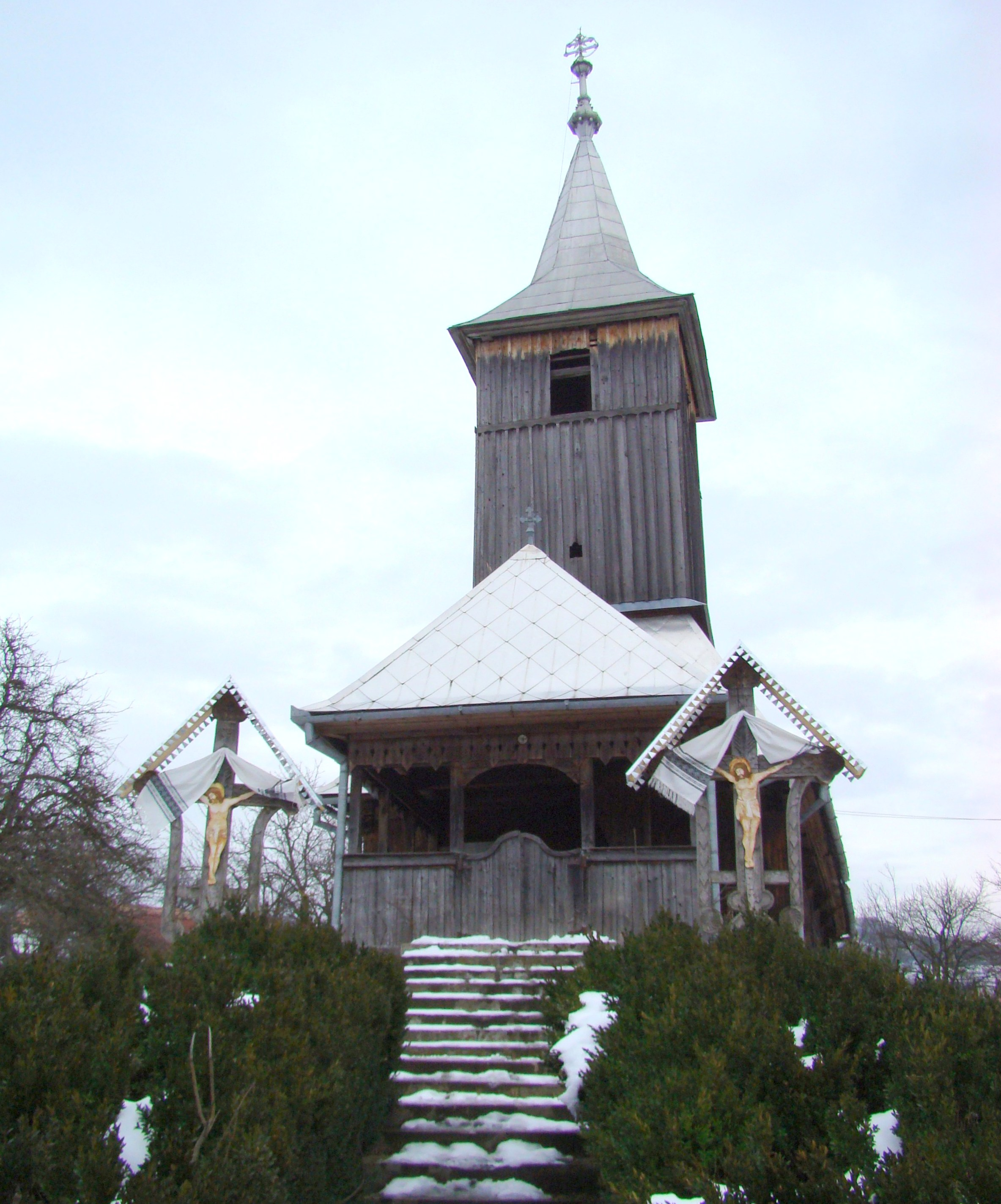
- Wooden church in Urisiu de Sus

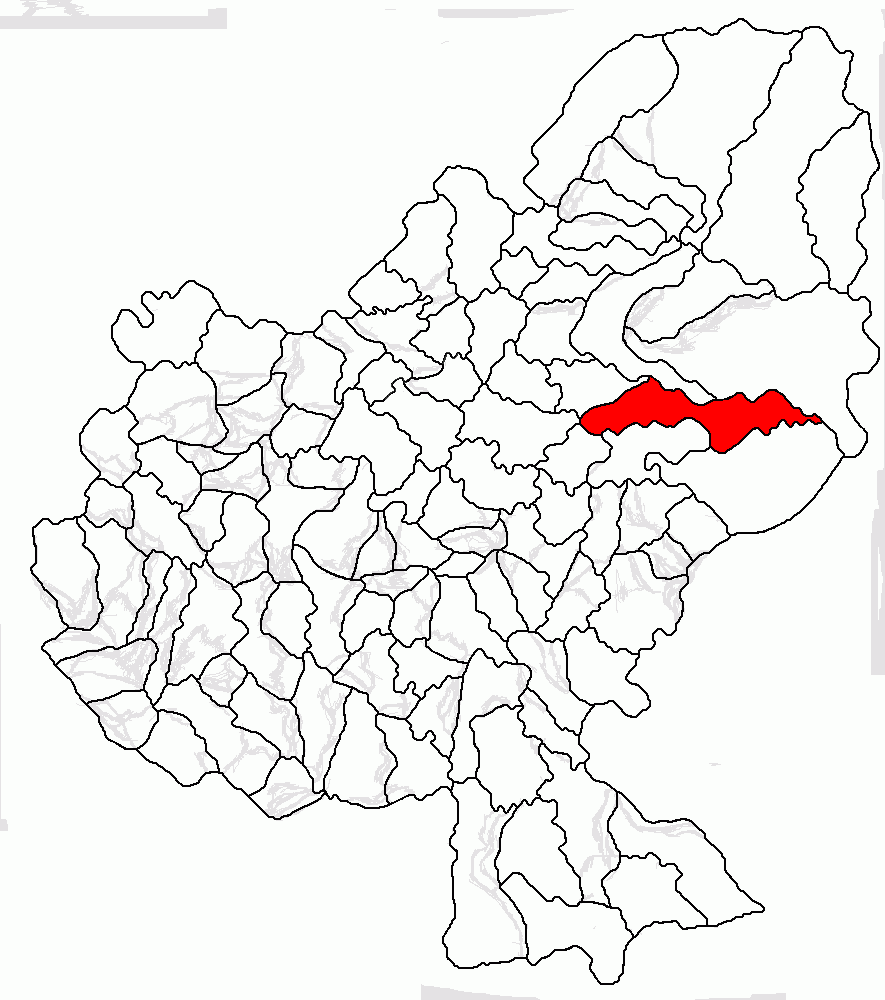
- Location in Mureș County

- Location in Romania
- Coordinates: 46°41′N 24°53′E
- Country: Romania
- County: Mureș

Government
  - Mayor (2024–2028): Mihai Dan Runcan (PSD)
- Area: 115.26 km^{2} (44.50 sq mi)
- Elevation: 436 m (1,430 ft)
- Population (2021-12-01): 1,762
  - Density: 15.29/km^{2} (39.59/sq mi)
- Time zone: UTC+02:00 (EET)
  - Summer (DST): UTC+03:00 (EEST)
- Postal code: 547160
- Area code: (+40) 0265
- Vehicle reg.: MS
- Website: primariachiheru.ro

Chiheru de Jos (Hungarian: Alsóköhér, Hungarian pronunciation: [ɒlʃoːkøheːr]) is a commune in Mureș County, Transylvania, Romania. It is composed of four villages: Chiheru de Jos, Chiheru de Sus (Felsőköhér), Urisiu de Jos (Alsóoroszi), and Urisiu de Sus (Felsőoroszi).

The commune has a surface area of 115.26 km^{2} (44.50 sq mi). It is located in the eastern part of the county, on the eastern edge of the Transylvanian Plateau, at the foot of the Gurghiu Mountains. The river Nadășa (also known as the Chiher) flows through the commune. It is at a distance of 20 km (12 mi) from Reghin, 24 km (15 mi) from Sovata, and 52 km (32 mi) from the county seat, Târgu Mureș.

== Demographics ==
The commune has absolute ethnic Romanian majority. According to the 2011 census, it had a population of 1,644, of which 89.05% were ethnic Romanians, 7.42% Roma, and 1.64% Hungarians. At the 2021 census, Chiheru de Jos had a population of 1,762; of those, 87.68% were ethnic Romanians and 7.78% Roma.

== See also ==
- List of Hungarian exonyms (Mureș County)
- Chiheru de Jos wooden church
- Urisiu de Jos wooden church
- Urisiu de Sus wooden church
