= Mark Nicolson =

American opera singer

Mark Nicolson is an American tenor opera singer residing in New York City.

Mark Nicolson was born in Galesburg, Illinois and grew up in Peoria, Illinois, where he attended Bradley University. He subsequently studied at University of North Texas College of Music and Indiana University, where he studied with bel-canto soprano, Virginia Zeani and bass, Nicola Rossi-Lemeni. He later studied with tenor legends Franco Corelli and James King. In New York, he won the Liederkranz Competition, received a Citation of Excellence from the Birgit Nilsson Prize Competition, won five study grants from the New York Wagner Society, and received a fellowship from Jerome Hines Opera-Music Theatre Institute. He is on the voice faculty of New Jersey City University.

== Roles ==
Mark Nicolson's roles included:

- European debut as Tamino The Magic Flute: Dublin Grand Opera.
- American debut as Don Ottavio Don Giovanni: Virginia Opera
- Cavaradossi in Tosca: Atlanta Opera, Palacio de Belles Artes (Mexico City), Opera Quebec.
- Faust in Faust: New Orleans Opera, Central City Opera, Mercury Theatre (New Zealand), Hong Kong Opera.
- Des Grieux in Manon: Seoul, Korea
- Male Chorus in The Rape of Lucretia (Britten): Wolf Trap Opera
- Tamino The Magic Flute: Hong Kong Opera.
- Pirro in Ermione (Rossini, American stage premiere): Opera Omaha
- Gernando in Armida (Rossini) Minnesota Opera
- Pinkerton in Madama Butterfly: Opera North (Leeds, England), Mississippi Opera.
- Alfredo in La Traviata: Opera Omaha
- Lennie in Of Mice and Men Carlisle Floyd : Opera Grand Rapids
- Radames in Aida: Opera Illinois
- Bacchus in Ariadne auf Naxos: New Orleans Opera

== Orchestral ==
- Verdi Requiem with the Philharmonia Orchestra, Chichester Festival
- Mahler 8th Symphony with the Connecticut Symphony

== Television ==
- Late Show with David Letterman 2003
