= Beica de Jos =

- Commune
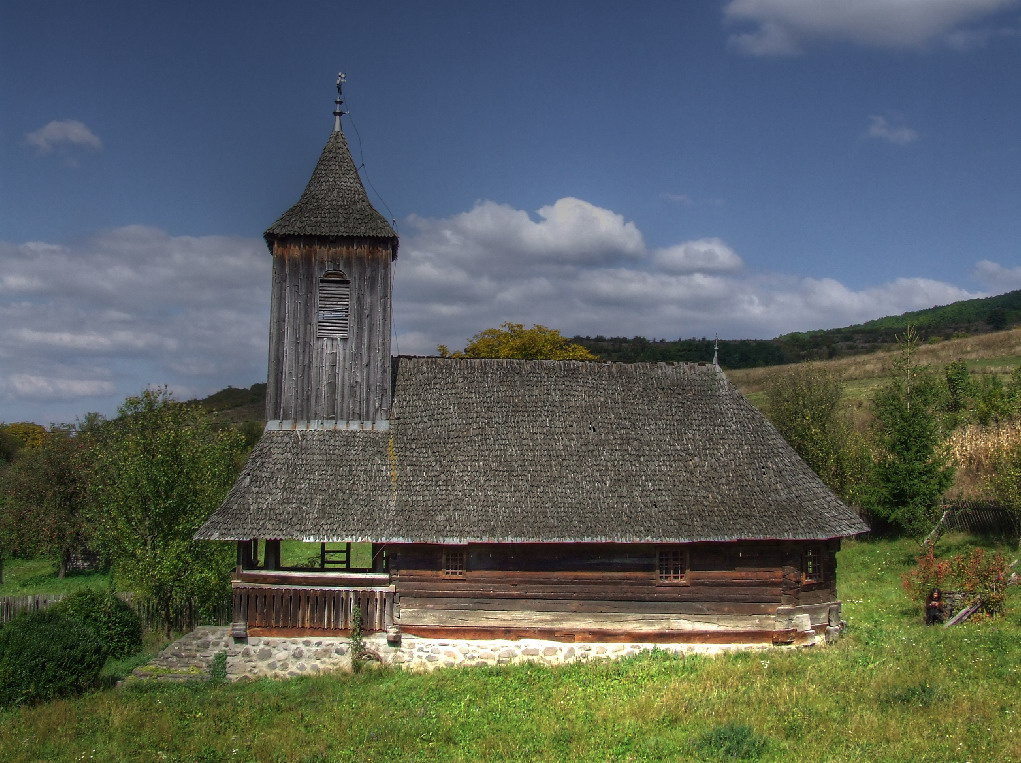
- Wooden church in Nadășa

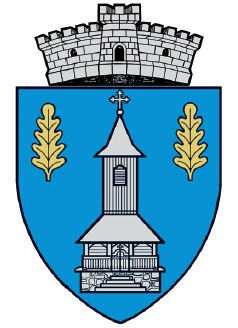
- Coat of arms

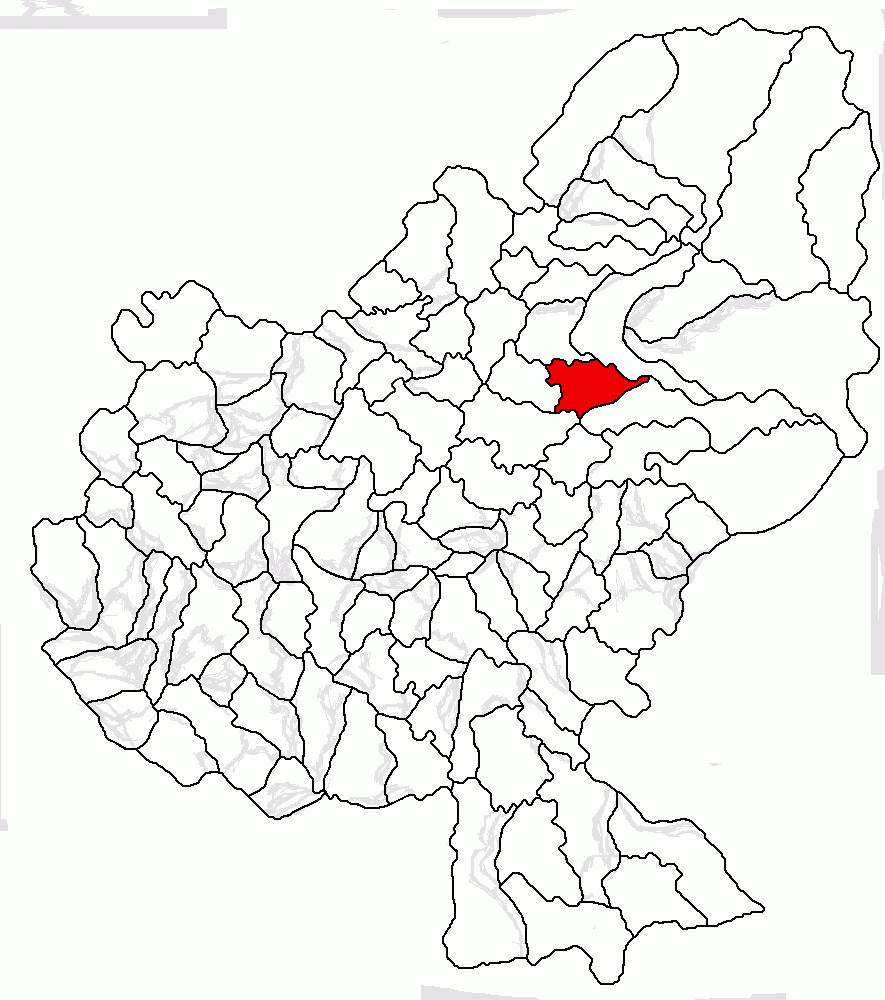
- Location in Mureș County

- Location in Romania
- Coordinates: 46°44′N 24°48′E
- Country: Romania
- County: Mureș

Government
  - Mayor (2020–2024): Maria Moldovan (PSD)
- Area: 45.69 km^{2} (17.64 sq mi)
- Elevation: 386 m (1,266 ft)
- Population (2021-12-01): 2,459
  - Density: 53.82/km^{2} (139.4/sq mi)
- Time zone: UTC+02:00 (EET)
  - Summer (DST): UTC+03:00 (EEST)
- Postal code: 547110
- Area code: (+40) 0265
- Vehicle reg.: MS
- Website: beica.ro

Beica de Jos (Hungarian: Alsóbölkény, pronounced [ˈɒlʃoːbølkeːɲ]; German: Ungarisch Birk) is a commune in Mureș County, Transylvania, Romania. It is composed of six villages: Beica de Jos, Beica de Sus (formerly Oláhbölkény; Felsőbölkény; German: Wallahisch-Birk), Căcuciu (Görgénykakucs; German: Kukuksdorf or Kakutsch), Nadășa (Görgénynádas), Sânmihai de Pădure (Szentmihály; German: Michelsdorf or Mechelsdorf), and Șerbeni (Soropháza).

The commune is located in the north-central part of the county, on the eastern edge of the Transylvanian Plateau, at the foot of the Gurghiu Mountains. It lies at a distance of 7 km (4.3 mi) from Reghin, 34 km (21 mi) from Sovata, and 40 km (25 mi) from the county seat, Târgu Mureș. The rivers Beica and Nadășa flow through the commune. Its neighbors are the city of Reghin and the communes Petelea, Gurghiu, Chiheru de Jos, Hodoșa, and Gornești.

Historical population
Year	Pop.	±%
1850	2,432	—
1930	3,594	+47.8%
1956	3,750	+4.3%
2002	2,243	−40.2%
2011	2,305	+2.8%
2021	2,459	+6.7%
Source: Census data

== See also ==
- List of Hungarian exonyms (Mureș County)
- Beica de Jos wooden church
- Nadășa wooden church
