= Călimani Mountains =

Mountain range in Transylvania, Romania

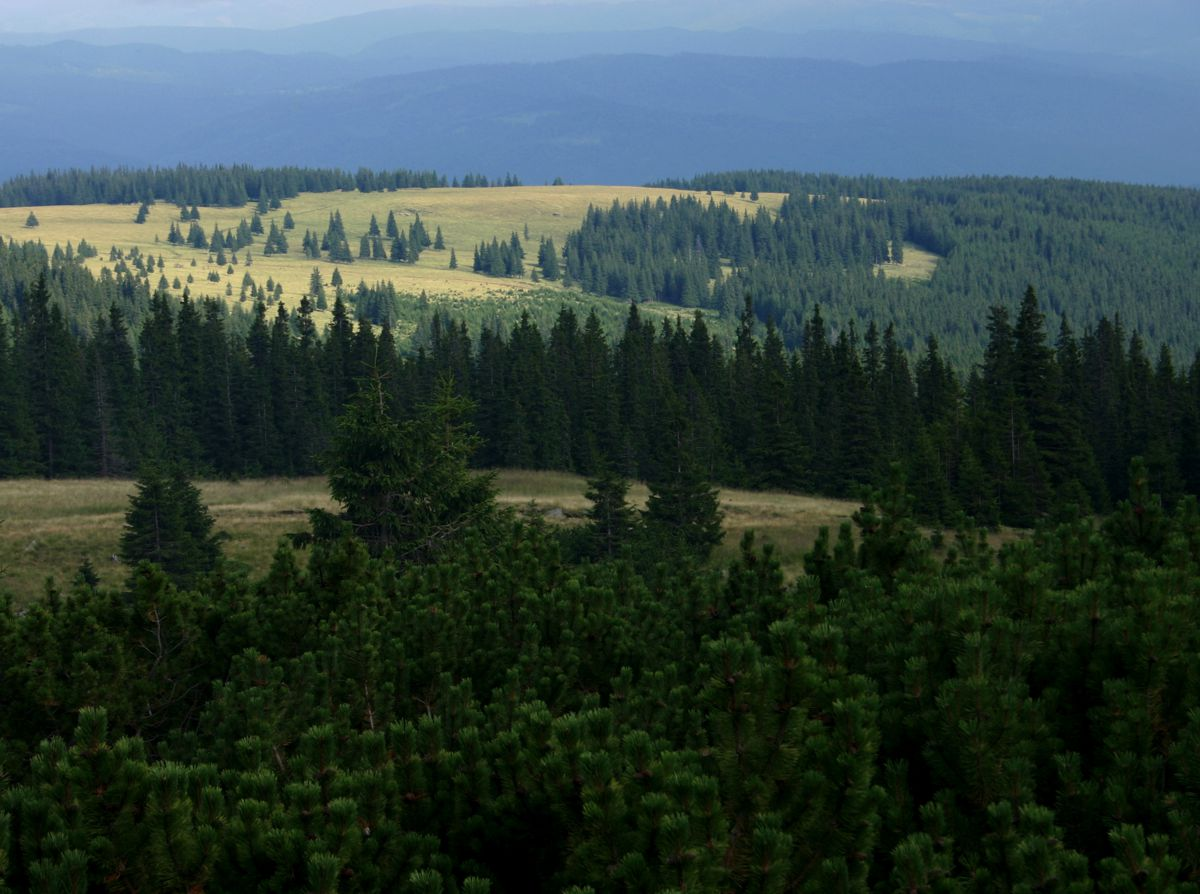

Highest point
- Peak: Pietrosul Călimanilor, Mureș County
- Elevation: 2,102 m (6,896 ft)
- Prominence: 1,194 m (3,917 ft)
- Listing: Ribu
- Coordinates: 47°7′30″N 25°11′9″E

Dimensions
- Length: 160 km (99 mi)
- Width: 40 km (25 mi) E–W
- Area: 6,400 km^{2} (2,500 mi^{2})

Geography
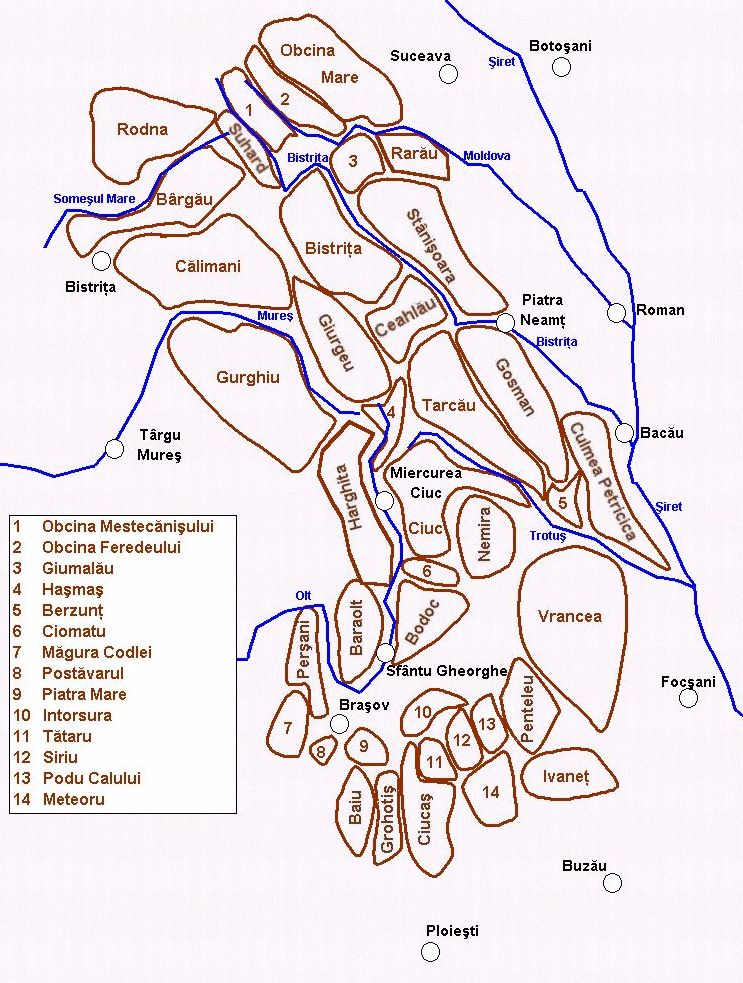
- Location of Călimani Mountains within Eastern Carpathians
- Country: Romania
- Counties: Mureș, Harghita, Suceava and Bistrița-Năsăud
- Borders on: Bârgău Mountains, Gurghiu Mountains, Giurgeu Mountains, Bistrița Mountains and Transylvanian Plateau

The Călimani Mountains (Romanian: Munții Călimani, Hungarian: Kelemen-havasok) are the largest volcanic complex of the Carpathian Mountains in Transylvania, Romania. Geologically they belong to the Căliman-Harghita Mountains group of the Inner Eastern Carpathians.

Maximum height is reached in Pietrosul Călimanilor Peak, at 2,102 m. Other significant peaks include: Bistriciorul (1,990 m), Stuniorul (1,885 m), Gruiului (1,913 m), Negoiul Unguresc (2,084 m), Rețițiș (2,021 m), Bradul Ciont (1,899 m), Iezerul Călimanilor (2,023 m). The volcanic crater with a diameter of 10 km is bordered by the highest peaks, and to north is split by Valea Neagră, a tributary of Dorna River. Inside the crater there are several secondary volcanic funnels (Pietricelui, Vârful Haitei, Negoiul Românesc), the last one being a exploitation of sulfur until 1997.

Among the major tourist attractions include odd shapes of volcanic rocks on Tihul, Rusca and Rețițiș Mountains, but especially on Tămău and Lucaciu Mountains. In the last sector can be found the geological reserve 12 Apostles.

== Formation ==
The Călimani Mountains, alongside Gurghiu and Harghita Mountains, fall in the southern group of the youngest mountains in Romania, with extinct craters about 1.8–5 million years ago (Lower Quaternary), that formed in the Upper Pliocene (late Tertiary Neogene). Intense Neogene volcanic activity led to the emergence of huge accumulations of lava spread over a length of 450 km (of which 375 in Romania). Consisting of alternating lava, agglomerates and ash (stratovolcano), the Călimani belongs to the southern group – the most important volcanic mass – with an area of approximately 6,400 km², with a width of about 40 km and a length of nearly 160 km.

== Flora ==
Following studies of Romanian and foreign biologists, from 1900 until recent years, were mentioned 1,004 species of vascular plants of which trees and shrubs are inferior in number of species, in favor of herbal plants.

There are several ecosystems: mixed forests of spruce and beech in Mureș Defile, spruce forests in Neagra Basin, spruce forests mixed with stone pine (scientific reserve), junipers and cades, and over 1,900 m, alpine meadows.

== Călimani National Park ==
Founded in 1990, the Călimani National Park is one of the largest national parks in Romania. The park has a total area of 24,041 ha and includes the following areas:

- Scientific Reserve of Juniper Trees with Pinus cembra, category Ia IUCN in area of 384.2 ha;
- Reserve Iezer Lake of Călimani, category IV IUCN in area of 322 ha;
- Geological Reserve 12 Apostles, category IV IUCN in area of 200 ha.

== Tourism ==
The Călimani Mountains are a popular ecotouristic location among Romanians and foreigners. The area in which lies the mountain range overlaps Țara Dornelor, a region where nature and folk traditions blend. During the winter, ski slopes in Vatra Dornei are overrun by tourists. During the summer, they can practice river rafting, mountain biking, paragliding or zip lining.

Though not a reason for tourism per se, the mountains were also noted to be the site of Castle Dracula in Bram Stoker's novel Dracula.
