= Secuș =

River in Romania

- Location within Romania

Location
- Country: Romania
- Counties: Mureș County

Physical characteristics
- Mouth: Gurghiu
  - coordinates: 46.7695°N 25.2136°E
- Length: 12 km (7.5 mi)
- Basin size: 31 km^{2} (12 sq mi)

Basin features
- Progression: Gurghiu→ Mureș→ Tisza→ Danube→ Black Sea

The Secuș is a left tributary of the river Gurghiu in Transylvania, Romania. It discharges into the Gurghiu in Lăpușna. Its length is 12 km (7.5 mi) and its basin size is 31 km^{2} (12 sq mi).
