= Habic =

Habic Hétbükk-patak
- Location within Romania

Location
- Country: Romania
- Counties: Mureș County
- Villages: Habic

Physical characteristics
- Mouth: Mureș
  - location: Downstream of Petelea
  - coordinates: 46.7236°N 24.6927°E

Basin features
- Progression: Mureș→ Tisza→ Danube→ Black Sea

The Habic (Hungarian: Hétbükk-patak, English: "Seven Beeches Creek") is a left tributary of the Mureș river in Transylvania, Romania. It discharges into the Mureș near Petelea. Its length is 11 km (6.8 mi) and its basin size is 19 km^{2} (7.3 sq mi).
