= Virginia Zeani =

Romanian opera singer (1925–2023)

Virginia Zeani Commendatore OMRI
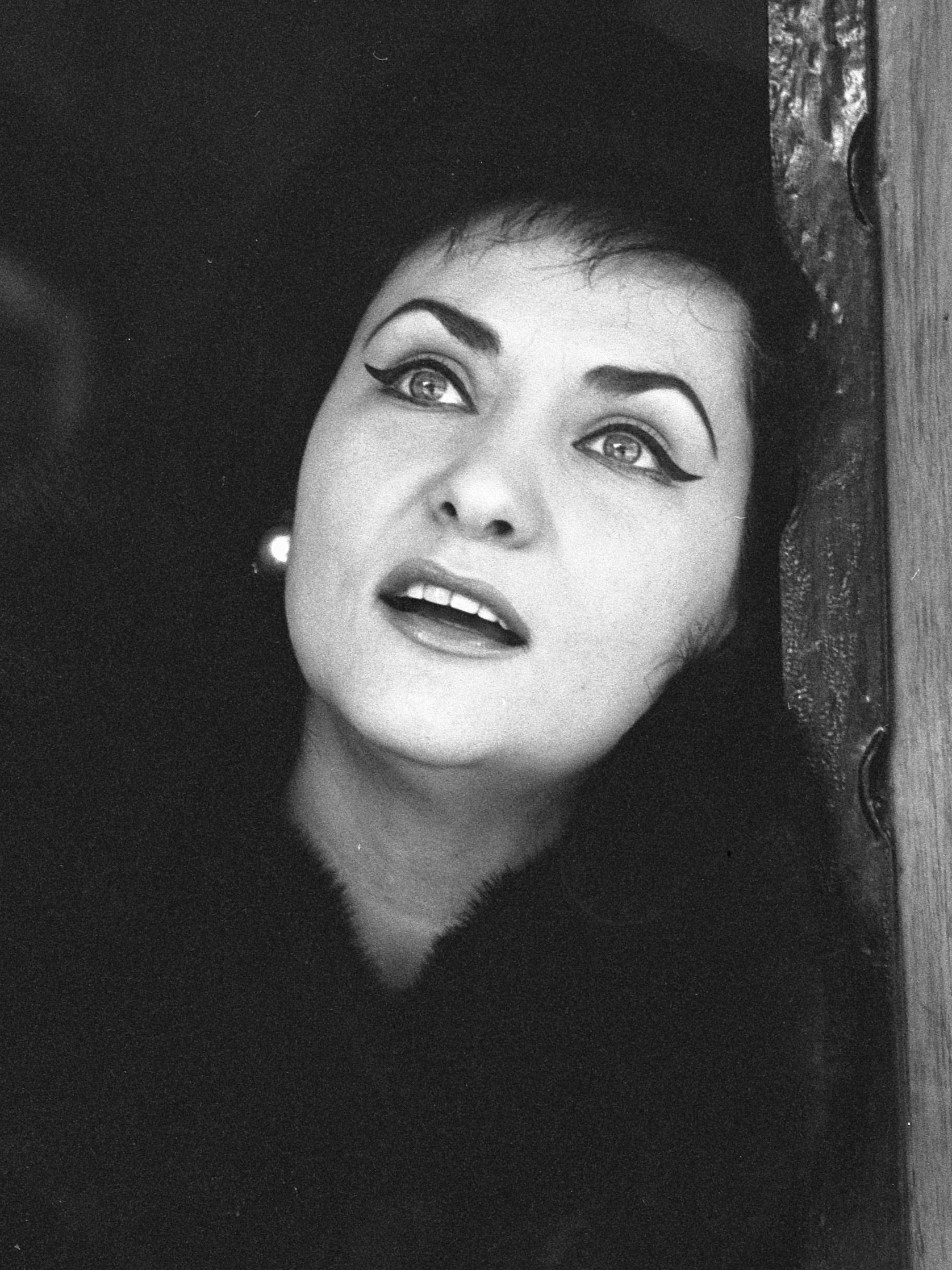
- Zeani in 1963
- Born: Virginia Zehan; 21 October 1925; Solovăstru, Romania
- Died: 20 March 2023 (aged 97); West Palm Beach, Florida, US
- Occupations: Opera singer; soprano; vocal pedagogue
- Years active: 1948–1982
- Spouse: Nicola Rossi-Lemeni (m. 1957; died 1991)
- Children: 1
- Awards: Order of Merit of the Italian Republic – Commander 1965; Order of the Star of Romania – Knight 2016
- Website: virginiazeani.org

Virginia Zeani Commendatore OMRI (born Virginia Zehan; 21 October 1925 – 20 March 2023) was a Romanian-born opera singer who sang leading soprano roles in the opera houses of Europe and North America.

As a singer, she was known for her dramatic intensity and the beauty, wide range, and suppleness of her voice, which allowed her to sing a repertoire of 69 roles ranging from the heroines in belcanto operas by Rossini and Donizetti to those of Wagner, Puccini and Verdi. She also created roles in several 20th-century operas, including Blanche in Poulenc's Dialogues of the Carmelites.

Zeani made her professional debut in 1948 as Violetta in La traviata, which would become one of her signature roles; she performed this role over 640 times.

After her retirement from the stage in 1982, she became a well-known voice teacher. She was married to the Italian bass Nicola Rossi-Lemeni from 1957 until his death in 1991. They both taught at Indiana University's Jacobs School of Music for many years (and continued to teach singing privately afterwards). She spent her last years in Palm Beach County, Florida.

== Early life and education ==
Zeani was born on 21 October 1925 in Solovăstru, a central Transylvania village located in Romania. She has described to interviewers a childhood where, despite bronchial troubles, she was always singing, even when she was fetching water from the river for cooking. She said that music had "entered her soul" after hearing a band of gypsies, one of whom was playing a hora on the violin, and at the age of nine she became determined to be an opera singer after hearing a performance of Madama Butterfly.

When she was 13 a benefactor in the village paid for her to study singing in Bucharest with Lucia Anghel, a mezzo-soprano with whom she trained as a mezzo-soprano during her teenage years. As a young adult during World War II she began studying with Ukrainian soprano Lydia Lipkowska in Bucharest. Lipkowska disagreed with Anghel's assessment of her voice as a mezzo-soprano, and retrained her voice as a soprano. Zeani stated of her experience during this time

I had no high notes at all at that point in my life, but after she accepted me and I worked with her for three months I had an incredible range.

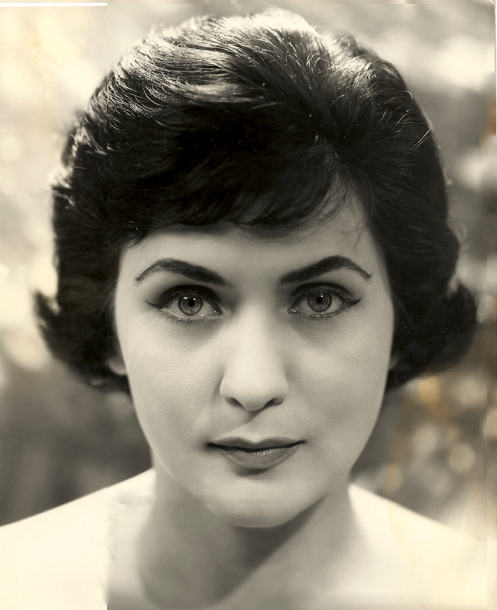
Headshot of Zeani

After World War II ended, Zeani emigrated to Italy and continued her vocal studies in Milan. By then she knew the leading soprano roles in four operas by heart—the title role in Manon, Marguerite in Faust, Violetta in La traviata and Mimì in La bohème. In Milan she had extensive coaching with the conductor Antonio Narducci. She also sought out the tenor Aureliano Pertile, who had long been one of her idols for the beauty of his phrasing and diction. She called at his house and, according to Zeani, when he opened the door she burst into tears and was unable to speak. Pertile's wife ushered her inside and, after talking to her, Pertile accepted her as a student on a non-paying basis, giving her private lessons and allowing her to attend his master classes. She repaid him by running errands and helping his wife with household chores.

== Operatic career ==
Virginia Zeani in La Traviata, Teatro dell'Opera, Rome, 1950s (photo with dedication). The singer performed Violetta at the Teatro dell'Opera of Rome, debuting in 1954 and cementing her career in the role, becoming a "house prima donna" until 1976.

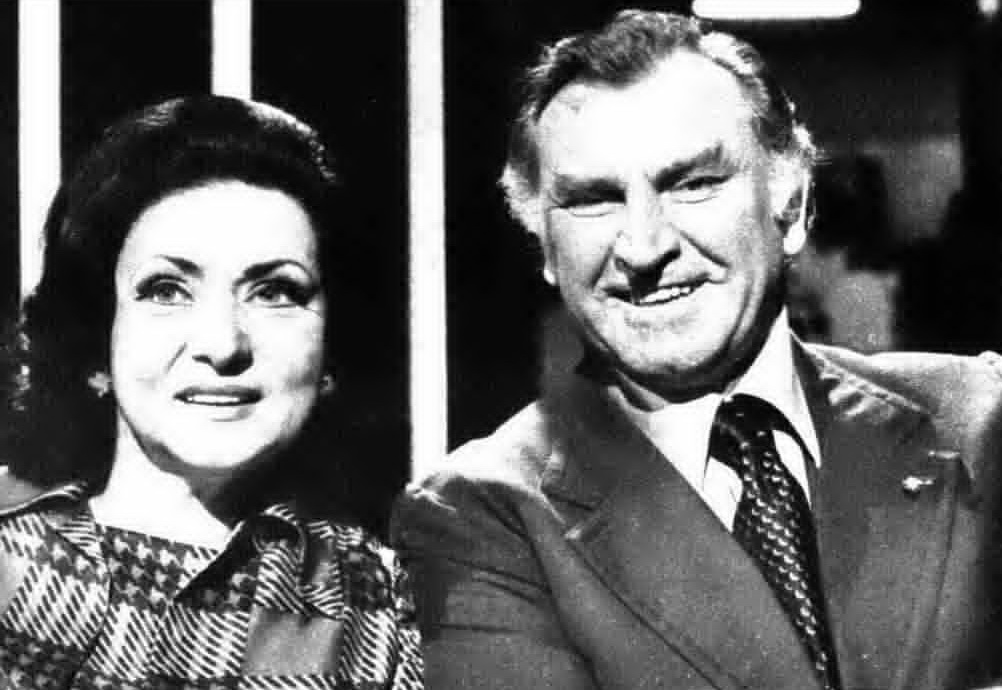
Zeani and Nicola Rossi-Lemeni, 1975

Zeani made her professional debut as Violetta in La traviata at the Teatro Duse in Bologna in 1948 as a last-minute replacement for Margherita Carosio. It was to become her signature role. one she sang 648 times during the course of her career.

She initially sang in Italian regional opera houses but also began appearing abroad. In 1950 and 1951 she sang in Egypt in private concerts for King Farouk as well as in a series of operas in Cairo and Alexandria. She also sang Violetta in Geneva in 1952 and at London's Stoll Theatre in 1953.

She made her Florence debut as Elvira in I puritani in 1952, replacing Maria Callas, who had withdrawn from the production after two performances. It was during the Puritani performances that she first met her future husband, the Italian bass Nicola Rossi-Lemeni.

They met again in 1956 when she made her La Scala debut as Cleopatra in Handel's Giulio Cesare, opposite Rossi-Lemeni as her Giulio Cesare. He soon proposed and the couple married in 1957. A year later their son Alessandro was born. Zeani and Rossi-Lemeni made their home in Rome and would appear together in thirteen more operas.

At the start of her career Zeani had specialised in coloratura roles including Lucia in Lucia di Lammermoor, Elvira in I puritani, Gilda in Rigoletto, and Adèle in Le comte Ory. However, in a 1960 production at the Teatro dell'Opera di Roma she sang all three heroines in The Tales of Hoffmann — Olympia (coloratura soprano), Antonia (lyric soprano), and Giulietta (dramatic soprano). Rossi-Lemeni appeared in the same production playing all four villains — Lindorf, Coppelius, Dr. Miracle, and Dappertutto. From 1970 she increasingly assayed the heavier dramatic soprano roles with great success, notably the title roles in Aida, Tosca, Manon Lescaut, and Fedora. She also sang Elsa in Wagner's Lohengrin and Senta in his Flying Dutchman.

Zeani sang 69 roles in the course of her career in a wide-ranging repertoire. She sang in important revivals of Verdi's early and now rarely performed opera Alzira (Rome, 1970) and belcanto operas such as Donizetti's Maria di Rohan (Naples 1965) and Rossini's Otello (Rome, 1968), but she also sang in the world premieres and early performances of several 20th-century operas. She created the roles of Giannina in Jacopo Napoli's Un curioso accidente (Bergamo, 1950), Blanche in Poulenc's Dialogues of the Carmelites (Milan, 1957), Alissa in Raffaello de Banfield's Alissa (Geneva, 1965) and Irene in Renzo Rossellini's L'avventuriero (Monte Carlo, 1968). She also sang Mary Vetsera in the first staging of Barbara Giuranna's dodecaphonic opera Mayerling (Naples, 1960), a role written expressly for her. Her other roles in 20th-century works include Magda Sorel in The Consul and Eunomia in Adriano Lualdi's Il diavolo nel campanile (both under Tullio Serafin at the Maggio Musicale in Florence) and multiple performances of La voix humaine in the 1970s.

By the time she had begun her career as a voice teacher in 1980, Zeani had basically retired from the stage, but she returned in 1982 for her last opera performance, Mother Marie in Dialogues of the Carmelites at the San Francisco Opera.

== Teaching career and later life ==
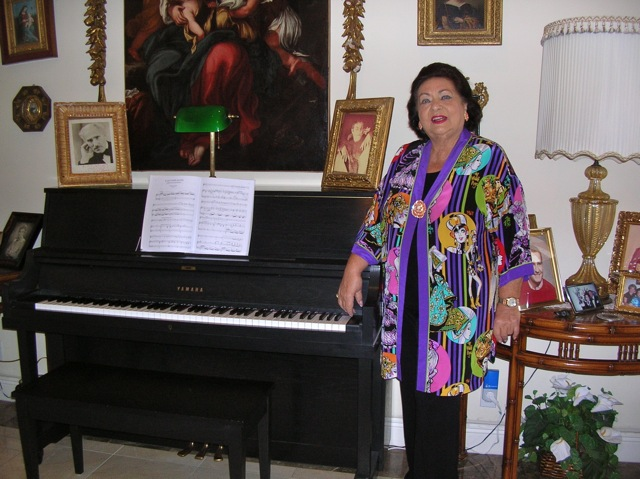
Zeani at home in her music room in Florida

In 1980 Zeani and Rossi-Lemeni settled in the United States where they had been offered teaching positions at Indiana University's Jacobs School of Music. She continued teaching there after Rossi-Lemeni's death in 1991 and was awarded the title of Distinguished Professor of Music in 1994. Among her many students at the Jacobs School who went on to international careers as opera singers are Angela Brown, Nicole Chevalier, Vivica Genaux, Sylvia McNair, Marilyn Mims, Mark Nicolson, Susan Patterson, Elizabeth Futral, Marina Levitt and Ailyn Perez.

Zeani retired to West Palm Beach, Florida in 2004, but continued to teach students privately. She was awarded Indiana University's President's Medal for Excellence in 2012 and received Lifetime Achievement Awards from the National Association of Teachers of Singing in 2016 and the National Opera Association in 2017. In 2010, she was named the Classical Singer Teacher of the Year. That year, she was also presented with the Marcello Giordani Lifetime Achievement Award. In 2017, the Virginia Zeani Festival had its inaugural season in Mures, Romania.

Zeani died in Palm Beach Gardens, Florida on 20 March 2023, aged 97, following a lengthy cardiac respiratory illness.

== Recordings ==
Zeani's recorded legacy largely rests on the approximately 60 "pirate" and "off-air" recordings of full-length operas made in the course of her career. She made very few studio recordings—Tosca, La traviata and a Verdi–Puccini recital released on LP by the Romanian Electrecord label, and a two-LP set of Donizetti, Bellini, Verdi, and Puccini arias on the Decca label, recorded when Zeani was in her early 30s. In 2014, Decca reissued the LPs on compact disk in their "Most Wanted Recitals!" series.

== Honors ==
Zeani was made Commander of the Order of Merit of the Italian Republic in 1965. In her native Romania she received the Royal Decoration of Nihil Sine Deo in 2011 and was made a Knight of the Order of the Star of Romania in 2016. She has also been the recipient of numerous opera awards, including the Puccini Award from the Fondazione Festival Pucciniano in 1992.

== Bibliography ==
- Beaumont, Roger and Itimaera, Witi (2018). Virginia Zeani: My Memories of an Operatic Golden Age. ISBN 9780473428297. OCLC 1053816893.
- Ciampa, Leonardo (2005). The Twilight of Belcanto: Including an Interview with Virginia Zeani (2nd edition). AuthorHouse. ISBN 9781418459567.
- Voinescu, Sever; Zeani, Virginia (2011). "Canta che ti passa", Virginia Zeani în dialog cu Sever Voinescu. Barcelona: Galaxia Gutenberg. OCLC 760053525.
