= Șumuleul Mare =

Șumuleul Mare Nagy-Somlyó
- Location within Romania

Location
- Country: Romania
- Counties: Harghita County
- Villages: Ciumani

Physical characteristics
- Source: Gurghiu Mountains, Mount Opro
  - coordinates: 46°35′18″N 25°25′45″E
  - elevation: 1,349 m (4,426 ft)
- Mouth: Mureș
  - location: Ciumani
  - coordinates: 46°41′15″N 25°29′25″E
  - elevation: 733 m (2,405 ft)

Basin features
- Progression: Mureș→ Tisza→ Danube→ Black Sea
- Tributaries
  - right: Șumuleul Mic

The Șumuleul Mare (also: Șomleul Mare; Hungarian: Nagy-Somlyó, pronounced [ˈnɒcʃomjoː]) is a small river in the Gurghiu Mountains, Harghita County, central Romania. It is a left tributary of the river Mureș. It flows through the municipality Ciumani, and joins the Mureș near the village Ciumani. Its length is 17 km (11 mi) and its basin size is 54 km^{2} (21 sq mi).
