= Beica (Mureș) =

Beica Birka-patak
- Location within Romania

Location
- Country: Romania
- Counties: Mureș County
- Municipalities: Beica de Jos, Petelea

Physical characteristics
- Source: Gurghiu Mountains
- Mouth: Mureș
  - location: Petelea
  - coordinates: 46.737°N 24.709°E
- Length: 25 km (16 mi)
- Basin size: 101 km^{2} (39 sq mi)

Basin features
- Progression: Mureș→ Tisza→ Danube→ Black Sea
- Tributaries
  - left: Nadășa

The Beica (Hungarian: Birka-patak, meaning "Sheep Creek" ) is a small river in the Gurghiu Mountains, Mureș County, northern Romania. It is a left tributary of the river Mureș. It flows through the municipalities of Beica de Jos and Petelea, and joins the Mureș near the village Petelea. It is fed by several smaller streams, including Urisiu and Nadășa. Its length is 25 km (16 mi) and its basin size is 101 km^{2} (39 sq mi).
