= Călimani National Park =

National park in Romania

- Parcul Național Călimani
- IUCN category II (national park)
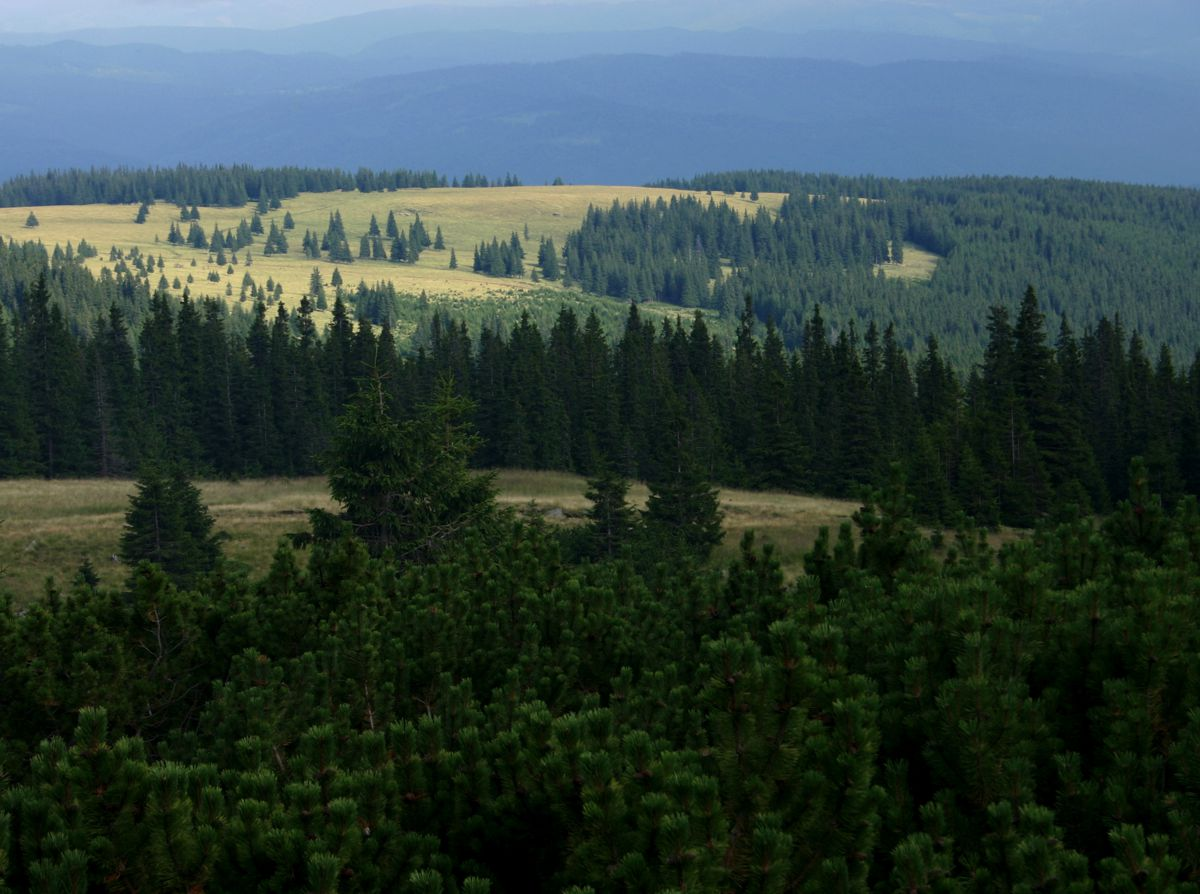
- Călimani Mountains

- Location within Romania
- Location: Romania; In the administrative territory of counties: Mureş – 45% Suceava – 35% Harghita – 15% Bistrița-Năsăud – 5%
- Nearest city: Vatra Dornei
- Coordinates: 47.127°N 25.168°E
- Area: 24.041 hectares (59.41 acres)
- Established: 2000
- Website: www.calimani.ro

The Călimani National Park (Romanian: Parcul Naţional Călimani) is a protected area (national park, category II IUCN) situated in Romania and located on the northern side of the Eastern Carpathians (Bistrița – Năsăud, Harghita, Mureș and Suceava counties). It is in the administrative territory of counties Mureș (45%), Suceava (35%), Harghita (15%), and Bistrița-Năsăud. It has 64,000 acres. It protects the Călimani Mountains.

== Description ==
The park is in a mountain area with diversified landforms: peaks (Pietrosul Călimanului - 2100 m, Gurghiu - 1776 m, Harghita - 1800 m, Lucaciu - 1778 m, 12 Apostoli - 1760 m, Ciomatu - 1301 m), rocky steep cliffs, gorges, valleys, dolines, hillocks, clints, ponors, glades; with natural areas covered with forests, pastures and meadows.

The natural area has several habitat types (Acidophilous Picea abies forests in the mountain region (Vaccinio-Piceetea), Larix decidua and/or Pinus cembra forests in the mountain region, species-rich Nardus mountain meadows, on siliceous substrates, Pinus mugo and Rhododendron myrtifolium shrubs, Shrubs with subarctic Salix species, Herbaceous vegetation on the banks of mountain rivers) that shelter a diverse range of flora and fauna specific to the Eastern Carpathians.

Located in the Călimani Mountains and including the largest volcanic crater in Romania, with a diameter of about 10 km (currently extinct), the Călimani National Park, with a total area of 24.566 ha, includes the nature reserves Doisprezece Apostoli (Twelve Apostles) (with the 12 Apostles Thematic Trail), Jnepenișul cu Pinus cembra (Mountain pine with Pinus cembra) - Călimani and Iezer Lake, and overlaps the special avifaunistic protection area of the Călimani Mountains (SPA site) - Natura 2000.

The former sulphur mining site in the Călimani Mountains is now an enclave within this national park.

== See also ==
- Protected areas of Romania
