= Nadășa =

- Location within Romania

Location
- Country: Romania
- Counties: Mureș County
- Communes: Chiheru de Jos, Beica de Jos

Physical characteristics
- Source: Gurghiu Mountains
- Mouth: Beica
  - location: Beica de Jos
  - coordinates: 46.7338°N 24.7855°E
- Length: 16 km (9.9 mi)
- Basin size: 33 km^{2} (13 sq mi)

Basin features
- Progression: Beica→ Mureș→ Tisza→ Danube→ Black Sea

The Nadășa or Chiher is a small river in the Gurghiu Mountains, Mureș County, northern Romania. It is a left tributary of the river Beica. It flows towards the northwest and discharges into the Beica in the village Beica de Jos. Its length is 16 km (9.9 mi) and its basin size is 33 km^{2} (13 sq mi).
