= Pietrosu Peak (Călimani) =

Summit in Romania

Coordinates: 47°07′30″N 25°11′09″E

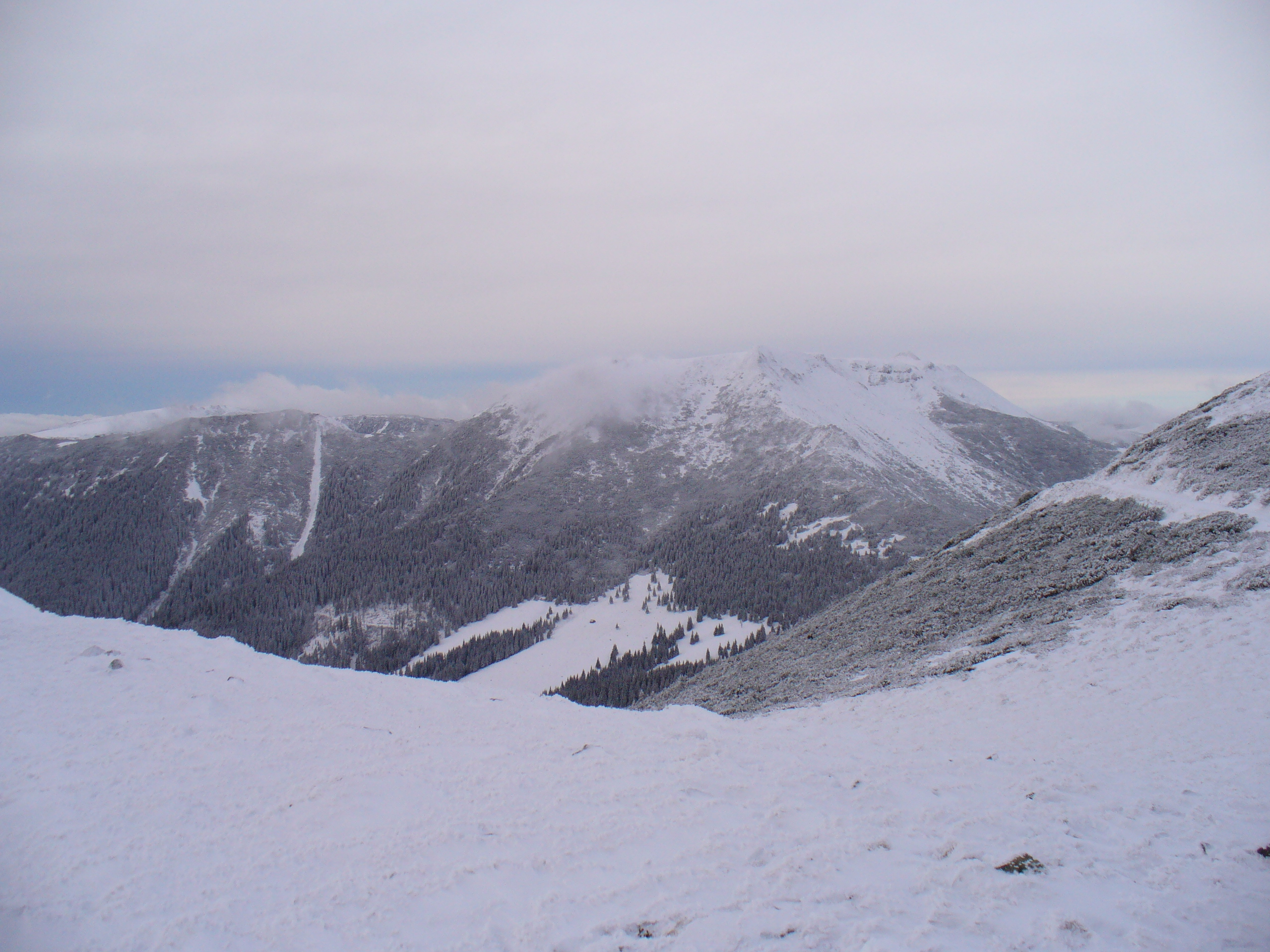
Pietrosu Peak, Călimani Mountains, Romania

Pietrosu Peak (Hungarian: Pietrosz or Nagy-Köves) is a peak of crystalline rocks in the Călimani Mountains in the Carpathian Mountains, Romania which reaches a height of 2,102 metres (6,896 ft). Mapping of the moraines and glacial landforms below the peak indicate at least two stages of glaciation during the Late Quaternary, subsequent to the initial one.
