= Ciuc Mountains =

Mountain range in Romania

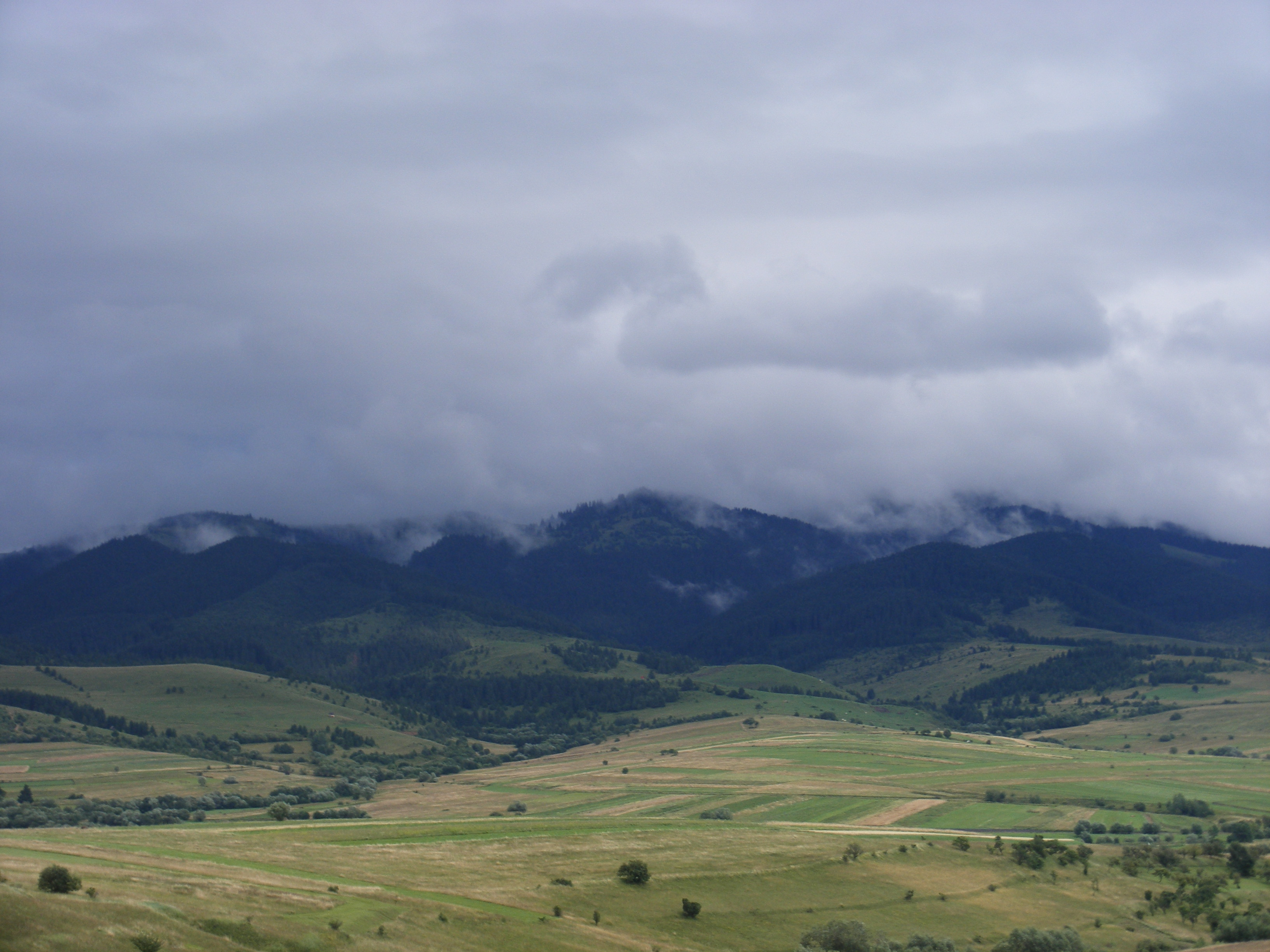

Highest point
- Elevation: 1,553 m (5,095 ft)
- Coordinates: 46.5°N 26.0°E

Geography
- Location within Romania
- Location: Romania

Ciuc Mountains (Romanian Munții Ciucului, Hungarian Csíki-havasok) are a mid-high range of mountains of Harghita County in Transylvania, Romania. Geologically they belong to the Căliman-Harghita Mountains group of the Inner Eastern Carpathians. Within Romania, however, it is traditional to divide the Eastern Carpathians (Carpații Orientali) into three geographical groups (north, center and south) instead. The Romanian categorization includes the Ciuc Mountains within the central Carpathians of Moldavia and Transylvania (Grupa Centrală, Carpaţii Moldo-Transilvani). The Trotuș River emerges from these mountains. The highest peak is Noșcolat, at 1,553 m.

== See also ==
- Divisions of the Carpathians
