= Petelea =

- Commune
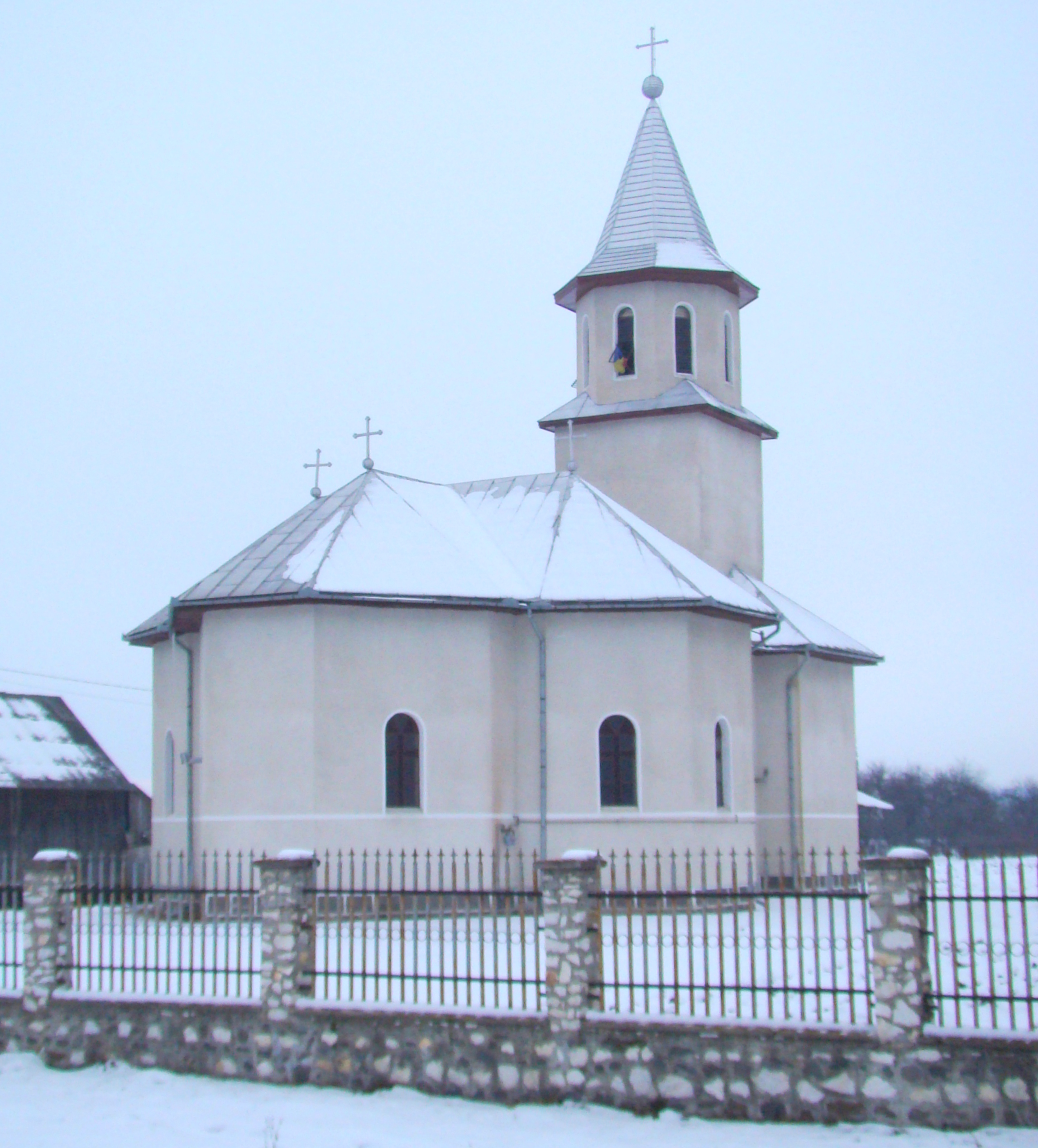
- Church of the Ascension, Petelea

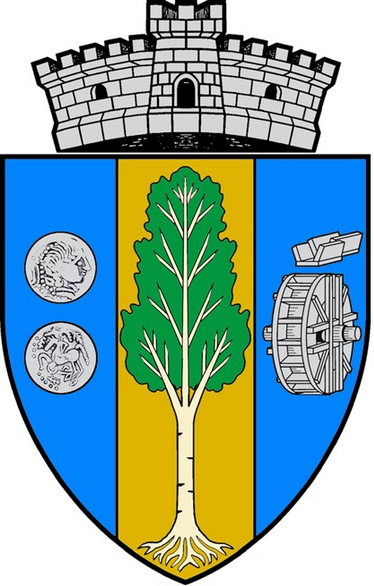
- Coat of arms

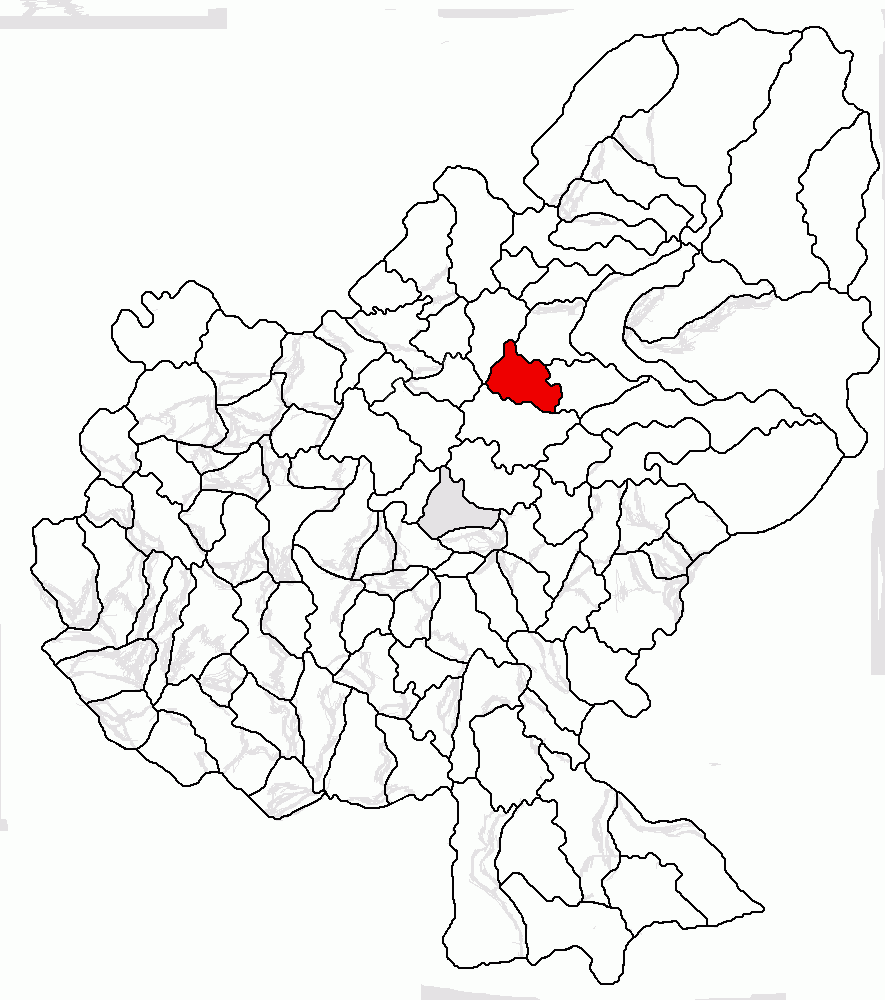
- Location in Mureș County

- Location in Romania
- Coordinates: 46°44′N 24°43′E
- Country: Romania
- County: Mureș

Government
  - Mayor (2020–2024): Sorin Pompei Pădurean (PNL)
- Area: 43.7 km^{2} (16.9 sq mi)
- Elevation: 358 m (1,175 ft)
- Highest elevation: 511.7 m (1,679 ft)
- Population (2021-12-01): 3,088
  - Density: 70.7/km^{2} (183/sq mi)
- Time zone: UTC+02:00 (EET)
  - Summer (DST): UTC+03:00 (EEST)
- Postal code: 547461
- Area code: +(40) 265
- Vehicle reg.: MS
- Website: www.primariapetelea.ro

Petelea (German: Birk; Hungarian: Petele, Hungarian pronunciation: [ˈpɛtɛlɛ]) is a commune in Mureș County, Transylvania, Romania that is composed of two villages: Habic (Hétbükk, meaning "Seven Beech Trees" in Hungarian) and Petelea.

The commune is located in the north-central part of the county, 25 km (16 mi) northeast of Târgu Mureș and 6 km (3.7 mi) south of Reghin, on the national road DN15 road. It is situated on the left bank of the river Mureș and it is traversed by two of its affluents: the Beica and the Habic.

At the 2021 census, Petelea had a population of 3,088; of those, 71.83% were Romanians and 21.96% Roma.

== Natives ==
- Virgil Bercea (born 1957), Bishop of the Eparchy of Oradea Mare of the Greek Catholic Church since 1997

== See also ==
- List of Hungarian exonyms (Mureș County)
