= Ibănești, Mureș =

Ibănești
- Commune
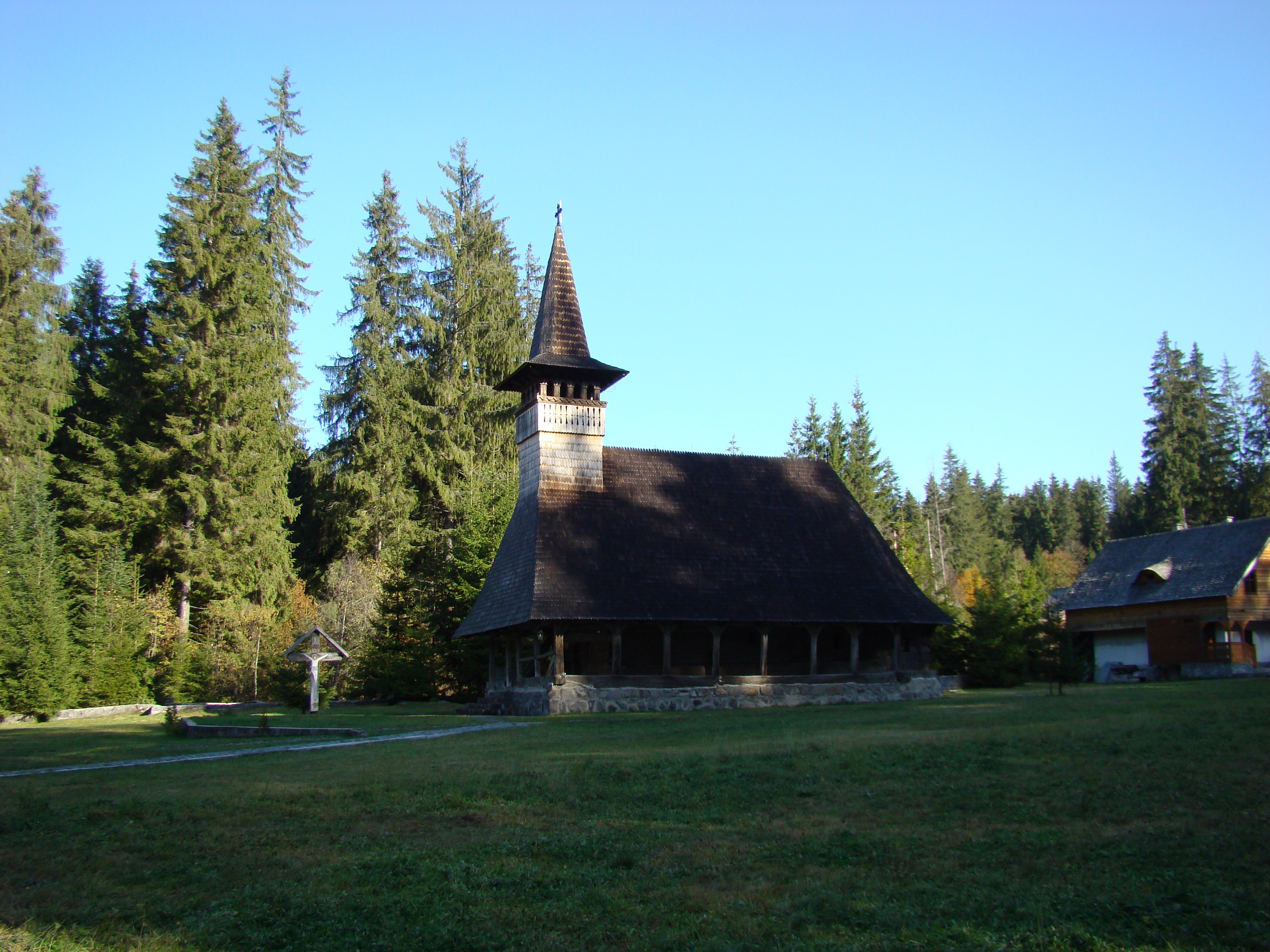
- Wooden church in Lăpușna

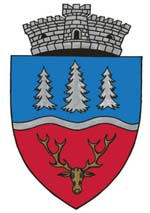
- Coat of arms

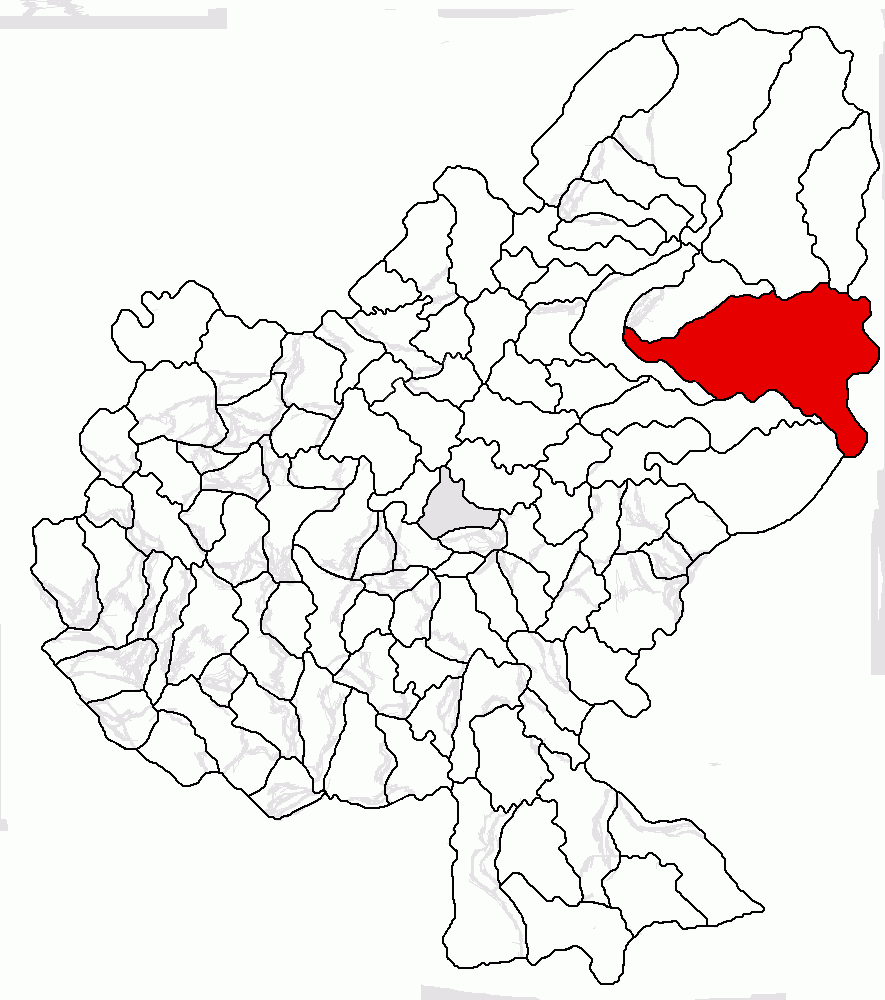
- Location in Mureș County

- Location in Romania
- Coordinates: 46.77°N 24.98°E
- Country: Romania
- County: Mureș

Government
  - Mayor (2020–2024): Vasile Dumitru Dan (PSD)
- Area: 313.14 km^{2} (120.90 sq mi)
- Elevation: 474 m (1,555 ft)
- Population (2021-12-01): 4,049
  - Density: 12.93/km^{2} (33.49/sq mi)
- Time zone: UTC+02:00 (EET)
  - Summer (DST): UTC+03:00 (EEST)
- Postal code: 547325
- Area code: +(40) 265
- Vehicle reg.: MS
- Website: ibanesti.ro

Ibănești (Hungarian: Libánfalva, Hungarian pronunciation: [ˈlibaːnfɒlvɒ]) is a commune in Mureș County, Transylvania, Romania. It is composed of ten villages: Blidireasa (Blidirászaházcsoport), Brădețelu (Disznópatak), Dulcea (Dulcsa), Ibănești, Ibănești-Pădure (Erdőlibánfalva), Lăpușna (Laposnyatelep), Pârâu Mare (Sziródrész), Tireu (Tyiró), Tisieu (Tyiszó), and Zimți (Zimc).

== Geography ==
The commune is situated in the western foothills of the Gurghiu Mountains, at an altitude of 474 m (1,555 ft), on the banks of the river Gurghiu and its tributaries, the rivers Isticeu and Secuș. It is located in the northeastern part of Mureș County, 15 km (9.3 mi) east of Reghin and 48 km (30 mi) northeast the county seat, Târgu Mureș, on the border with Harghita County.

Ibănești is crossed west to east by county road DJ153C, which starts in Reghin and connects to national road DN12 in Ditrău. The route of the Via Transilvanica long-distance trail passes through the villages of Tireu, Tisieu, Blidireasa, Brădețelu, and Zimți.

== Demographics ==
Historical population
Year	Pop.	±%
1850	1,446	—
1880	2,206	+52.6%
1900	2,966	+34.5%
1910	3,553	+19.8%
1930	4,253	+19.7%
1956	4,718	+10.9%
1966	5,986	+26.9%
1977	5,218	−12.8%
1992	4,728	−9.4%
2002	4,511	−4.6%
2011	4,357	−3.4%
2021	4,049	−7.1%
Source: Census data

At the 2002 census, Ibănești had 4,511 inhabitants, of which 99.6% were Romanians and 0.3% Hungarians; 90.3% were Romanian Orthodox, 5.8% Greek Catholic, 2.3% Seventh-day Adventist, 0.7% Pentecostal and 0.4% Baptist. At the 2011 census, the population was 4,357 (with 97.91% Romanians), while at the 2021 census, the population was 4,049 (with 94.44% Romanians).

== Natives ==
- Eugen Pojoni (1942–2026), footballer

== See also ==
- List of Hungarian exonyms (Mureș County)
