= Harghita Mountains =

Mountain range in Romania

Coordinates: 46°15′N 25°43′E

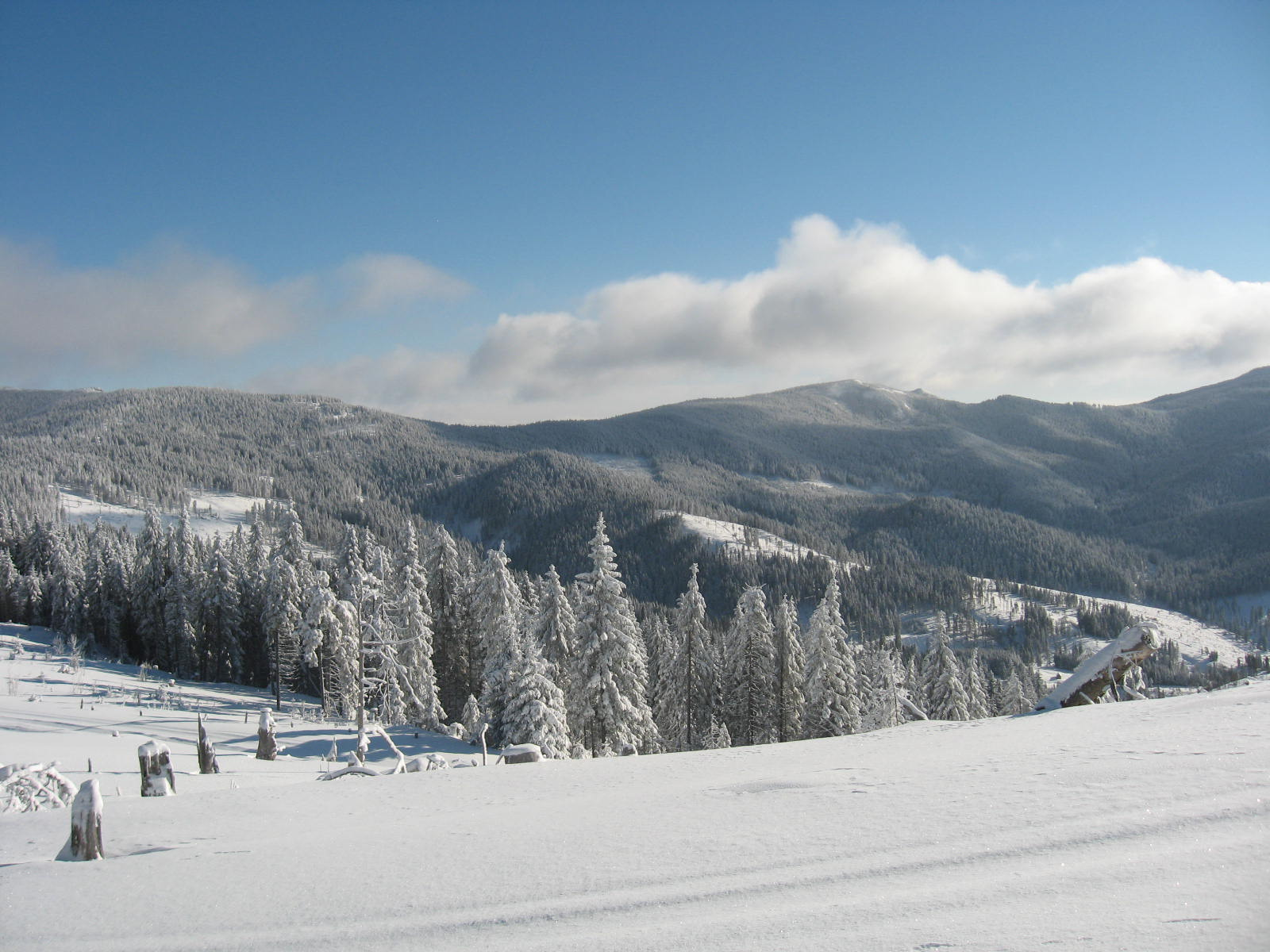
Harghita Mountains

The Harghita Mountains (in Hungarian Hargita, in Romanian Munții Harghita) is a volcanic mountain range of the Căliman-Harghita Mountains in Harghita County of Romania, part of the Inner Eastern Carpathians.

The range is about 80 kilometres (50 mi) long and 20 km (12 mi) wide, and is the "largest andesite mass" and the "largest volcanic body in the whole of Europe".

Its tallest peak is Harghita Mădăraș (Madarasi Hargita), at 1,801 m (5,909 ft).
