= Gurghiu, Mureș =

Gurghiu Görgényszentimre
- Commune
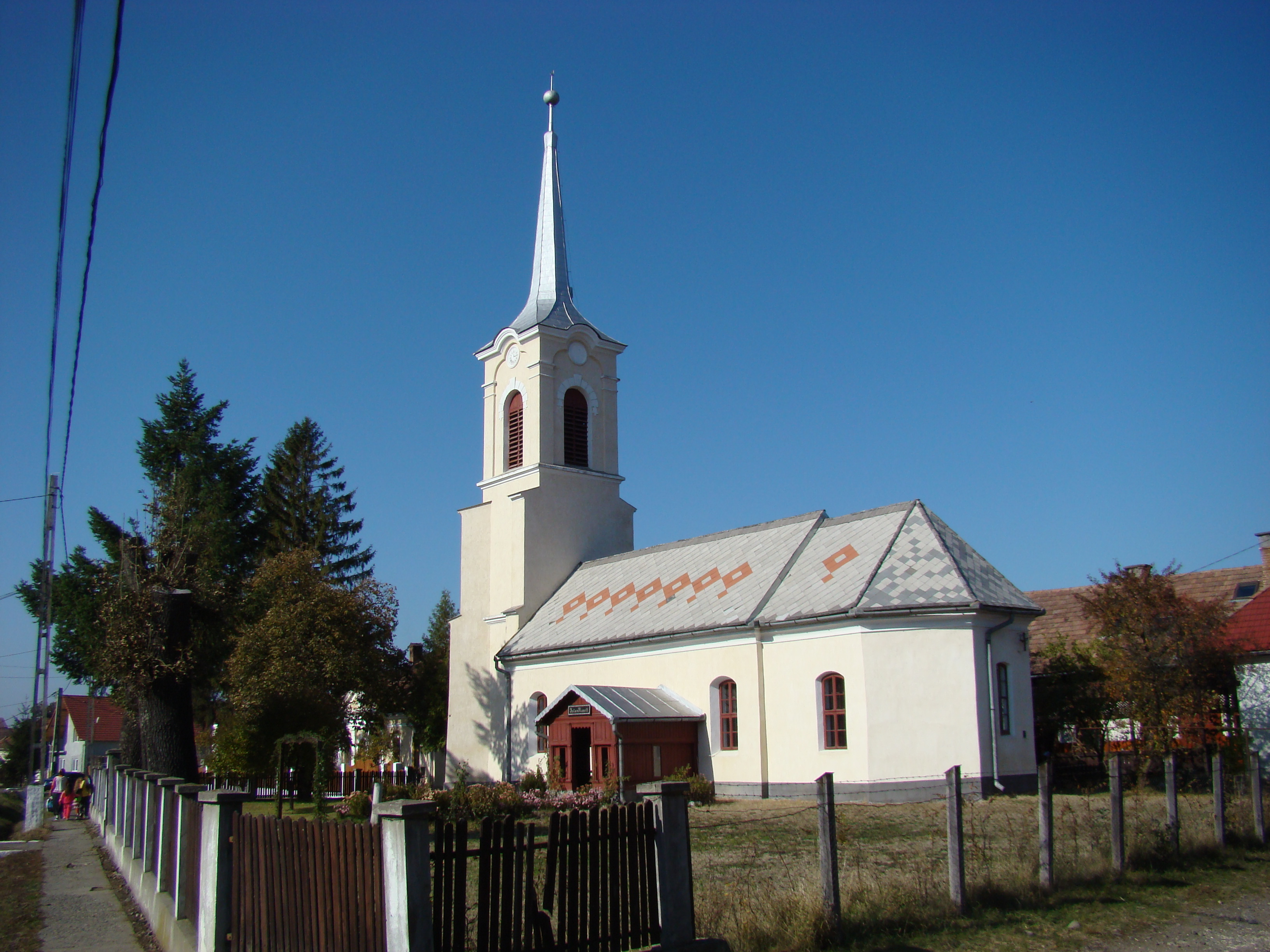
- Reformed church in Gurghiu

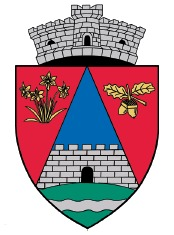
- Coat of arms

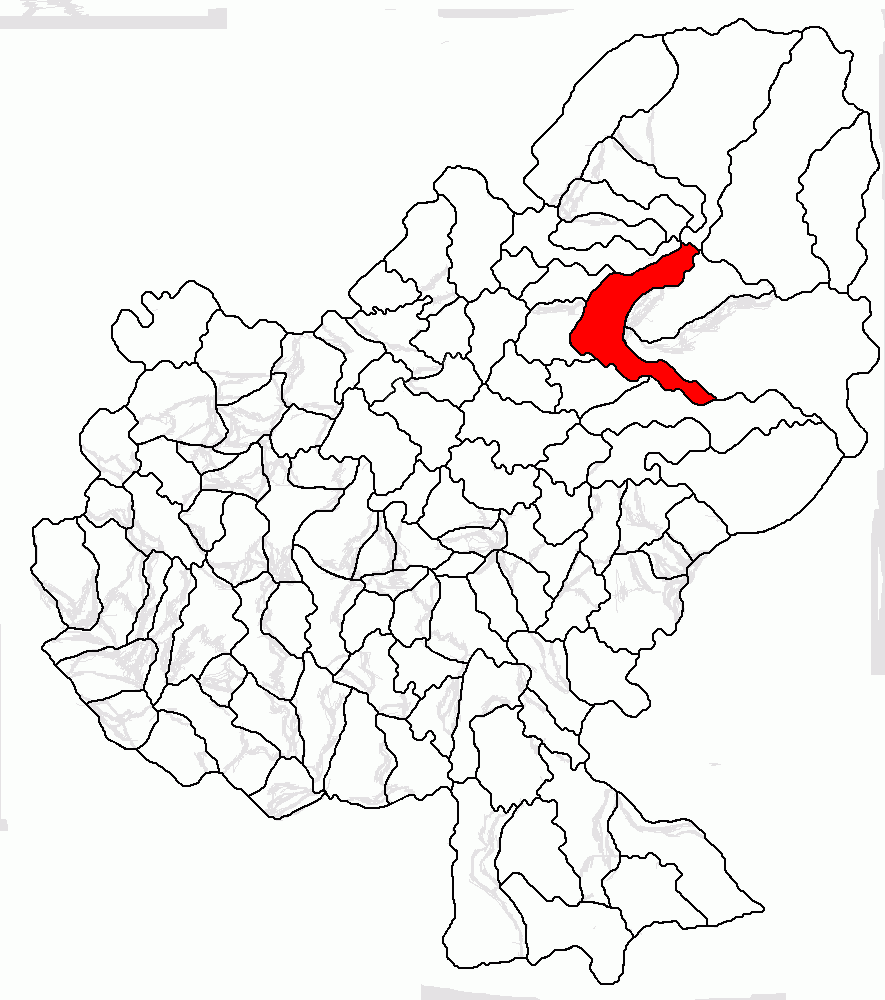
- Location in Mureș County

- Location in Romania
- Coordinates: 46°46′N 24°51′E
- Country: Romania
- County: Mureș

Government
  - Mayor (2020–2024): Laurențiu-Dumitru Boar (PNL)
- Area: 126.39 km^{2} (48.80 sq mi)
- Elevation: 424 m (1,391 ft)
- Population (2021-12-01): 5,530
  - Density: 43.8/km^{2} (113/sq mi)
- Time zone: UTC+02:00 (EET)
  - Summer (DST): UTC+03:00 (EEST)
- Postal code: 547295
- Area code: (+40) 0265
- Vehicle reg.: MS
- Website: comunagurghiu.ro

Gurghiu (Hungarian: Görgényszentimre, Hungarian pronunciation: [ˈɡørɡeːɲsɛntimrɛ]) is a commune in Mureș County, Transylvania, Romania. It is composed of ten villages: Adrian (Görgényadorján), Cașva (Kásva), Comori (Kincsesfő), Fundoaia (Kásvavölgy), Glăjărie (Görgényüvegcsűr), Gurghiu, Larga (Lárgatelep), Orșova (Görgényorsova), Orșova-Pădure (Szécs), and Păuloaia (Pálpatak).

The route of the Via Transilvanica long-distance trail passes through the villages of Adrian, Gurghiu, and Cașva.

At the 2021 census, the commune had a population of 5,530; of those, 63.06% were Romanians, 22.68% Hungarians, and 6.85% Roma.

== See also ==
- List of Hungarian exonyms (Mureș County)
