= Gurghiu Mountains =

Mountains of the Eastern Carpathians, in Transylvania, Romania

Coordinates: 46°44′59″N 25°11′49″E

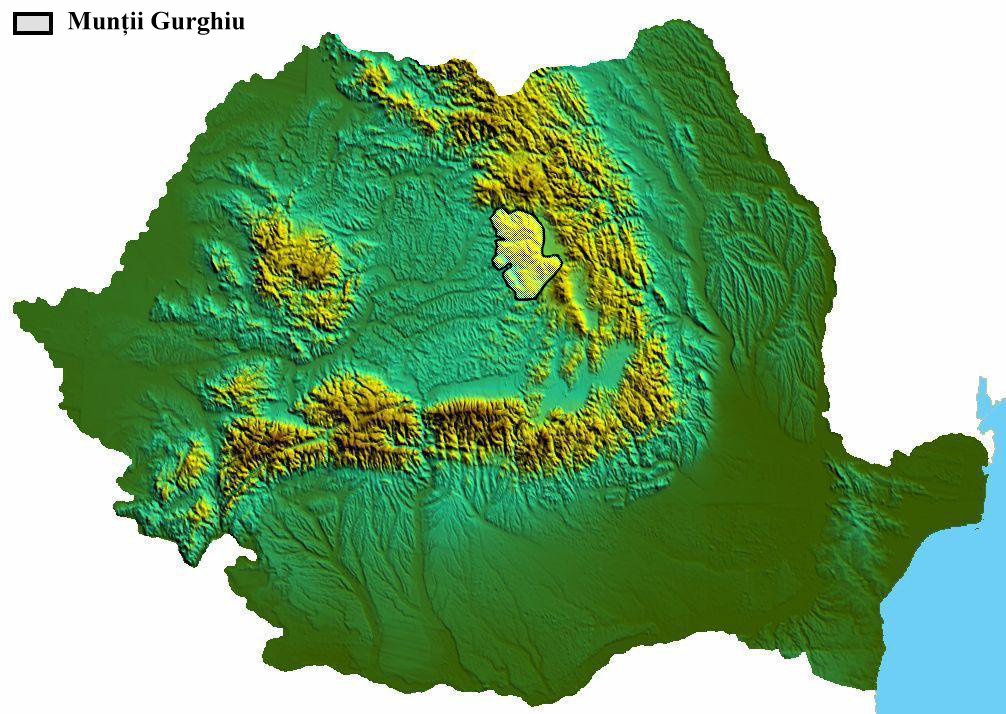
The Carpathian Mountains in Romania with the Gurghiu Mountains highlighted.

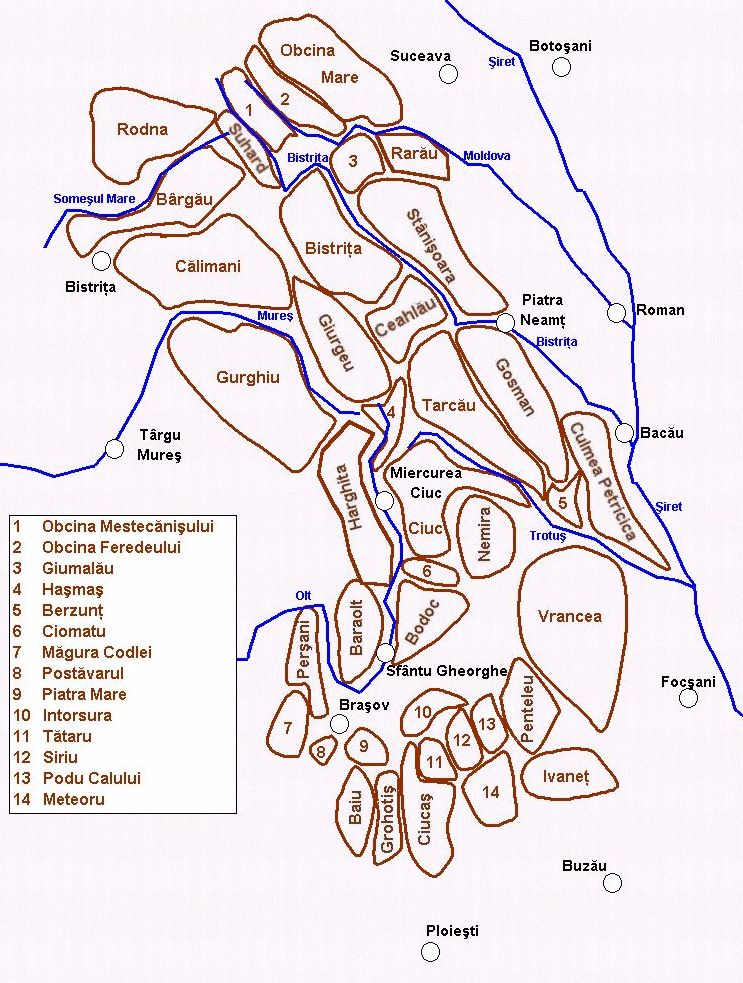
The Eastern Carpathian Mountains, including the Gurghiu Mountains.

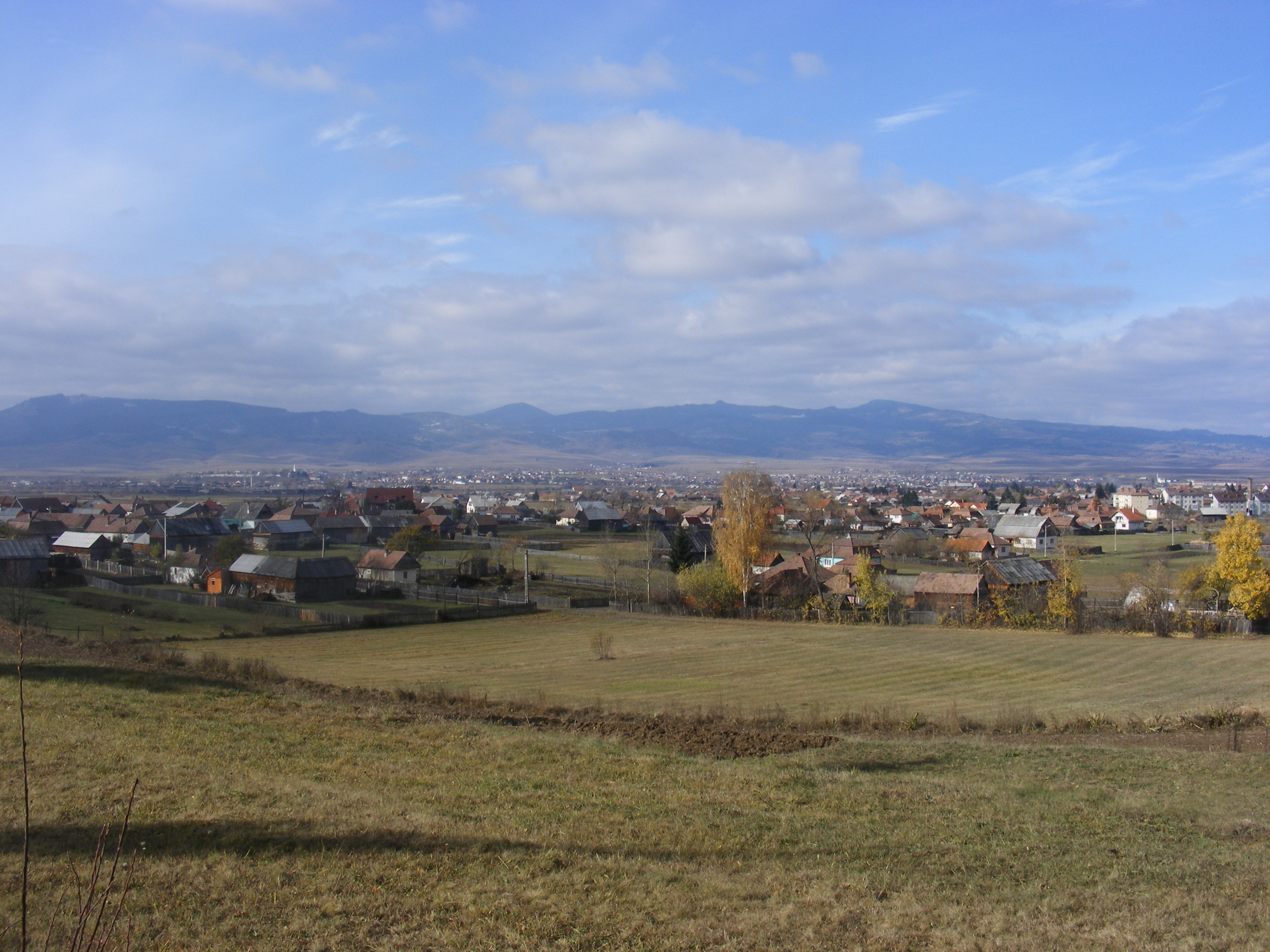
The Gurghiu Mountains viewed from Ditrău and Remetea

The Gurghiu Mountains (Romanian: Munții Gurghiu [muntsʲi ɡurɡʲu], Hungarian: Görgény [ɡørɡeːɲ]) are a range in the Căliman-Harghita Mountains of the Eastern Carpathians, Romania, in the Transylvania region. They cover an area of 581.76 km^{2} (224.62 sq mi).

The mountains are relatively low, but well-wooded and naturally beautiful. They are known for an abundance of wildlife, including deer, wild boar, wolves and bears.

The highest peak, Vârful Saca Mare, is 1,776 m (5,827 ft). Notable peaks include Amza Peak at 1,695 m (5,561 ft), Saca Mică Peak at 1,731 m (5,679 ft), and Fâncelu at 1,684 m (5,525 ft). Average rainfall is about 1,200 mm (47 in) and average temperature 4 °C (39 °F).

The Gurghiu Mountains are part of the volcanic mountain chain in the western side of the Eastern Carpathians. In the north the Mureș River separates them from the Călimani Mountains. To the south are the Harghita Mountains and the Târnava River Valley.

The mountains were formed during a period of volcanic activity between 9.4 and 5.4 million years ago, starting in the north and moving southwards.
