= IOD =

IOD or Iod may refer to:

- Ignition off draw, the drawing of electric current in a vehicle while shut off
- Indian Ocean Dipole, an irregular oscillation of sea surface temperatures
- Institute of Directors, a British professional organisation
- Institute of Directors (India), an Indian professional organisation
- Interactive Orbit Determination, a data reporting format for satellite observation
- International One Design, a sailboat designed in the 1930s
- Iod (river), a river in Romania, tributary of the Mureș
- Iod, a village in the commune Răstolița, Mureș County, Romania
- Inititial Orbit Determination
- I/O Die
