= Toplița Monastery =

Romanian Orthodox monastery in Toplița, Romania

Coordinates: 46°55′49″N 25°20′35″E

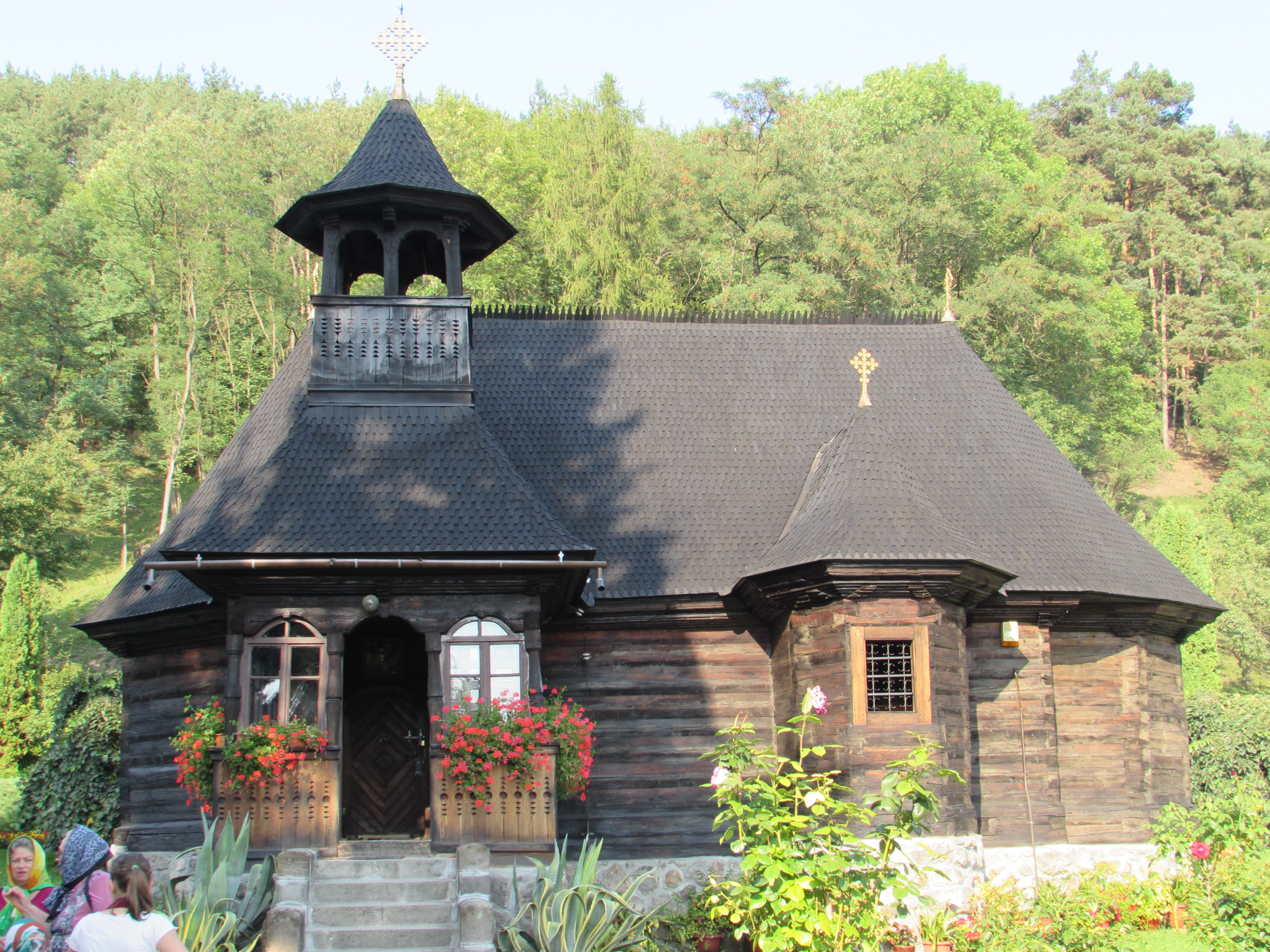
Wooden church of Toplița Monastery

The Toplița Monastery (Romanian: Mănăstirea Toplița) is a Romanian Orthodox monastery located at 68-70 Ștefan cel Mare Street in Toplița, Romania. It is dedicated to the Prophet Elijah.

Situated along the banks of a stream within the city limits, the monastery has uncertain origins. It owns a 1677 icon, possibly from the nearby Moglănești Monastery. A monk is recorded as living there in 1763, a year before it was shut down.

The wooden church, with a cross-shaped plan and a polygonal western end, features a portico open toward the south, above which a bell tower was placed. Its style features strong influences from Western Moldavia. It is dated 1847 and reportedly comes from Stânceni.

The church was brought to its current site in 1910. This is considered the date of the monastery's re-founding, by Miron Cristea. The starets’ residence dates to 1928. Early on, the monastery was directly subordinate to the Patriarch of All Romania; it later passed to the dioceses of, respectively, Cluj and Covasna and Harghita.

Repairs and additions were carried out in 1975-1976 and 1985–1990. A museum was established in 1994; it houses church art, old books and Cristea's personal effects. The wooden church is listed as a historic monument by Romania's Ministry of Culture and Religious Affairs.
