= Tihul River =

Tihul River may refer to:

- Tihul River (Dorna), in Suceava County, Romania
- Tih, a tributary of the Răstolița in Mureș County, Romania
