= TIH =

TIH may refer to:

- Their Imperial Highnesses, as a style
- The Incredible Hulk, a Marvel comics superhero
  - The Incredible Hulk, a 2008 Marvel Cinematic Universe film based on the superhero
- Tin Hau station, Hong Kong, MTR station code
- Timugon Murut language of Malaysia, ISO 639-3 code

== See also ==
- Tih, a river in Romania
