= Stega River =

Stega River may refer to:

- Stega, a tributary of the Bistra in Mureș County, Romania
- Stega River (Bistrița), in Bistrița-Năsăud County, Romania
