= Gălăoaia =

Gălăoaia Galonya-patak
- Location within Romania

Location
- Country: Romania
- Counties: Mureș County
- Villages: Gălăoaia

Physical characteristics
- Source: Călimani Mountains
- Mouth: Mureș
  - location: Borzia
  - coordinates: 46.9688°N 24.9282°E
- Length: 12 km (7.5 mi)
- Basin size: 33 km^{2} (13 sq mi)

Basin features
- Progression: Mureș→ Tisza→ Danube→ Black Sea
- Tributaries
  - right: Gălăoaia Mică

The Gălăoaia (Hungarian: Galonya-patak) is a left tributary of the river Mureș in Transylvania, Romania. It discharges into the Mureș in Borzia. Its length is 12 km (7.5 mi) and its basin size is 33 km^{2} (13 sq mi).
