= Bistra (Mureș) =

Bistra Bisztra-patak
- Location within Romania

Location
- Country: Romania
- Counties: Mureș County
- Villages: Bistra Mureșului

Physical characteristics
- Source: Călimani Mountains
- Mouth: Mureș
  - location: Bistra Mureșului
  - coordinates: 46.9642°N 24.9114°E
- Length: 26 km (16 mi)
- Basin size: 116 km^{2} (45 sq mi)

Basin features
- Progression: Mureș→ Tisza→ Danube→ Black Sea
- Tributaries
  - left: Valea din Mijloc, Stega
  - right: Donca

The Bistra (Hungarian: Bisztra-patak) is a right tributary of the river Mureș in Transylvania, Romania. It discharges into the Mureș in Bistra Mureșului. Its length is 26 km (16 mi) and its basin size is 116 km^{2} (45 sq mi).
