= Răstolița (river) =

Răstolița Ratosnya-patak
- Location within Romania

Location
- Country: Romania
- Counties: Mureș County

Physical characteristics
- Source: Călimani Mountains
- Mouth: Mureș
  - location: Răstolița
  - coordinates: 46.9694°N 24.9887°E
- Length: 21 km (13 mi)
- Basin size: 169 km^{2} (65 sq mi)

Basin features
- Progression: Mureș→ Tisza→ Danube→ Black Sea
- Tributaries
  - left: Scurta, Tih, Brad

The Răstolița (Hungarian: Ratosnya-patak) is a right tributary of the river Mureș in Transylvania, Romania. It discharges into the Mureș in the village Răstolița. Its length is 21 km (13 mi) and its basin size is 169 km^{2} (65 sq mi).
