= Deda, Mureș =

Deda
- Commune
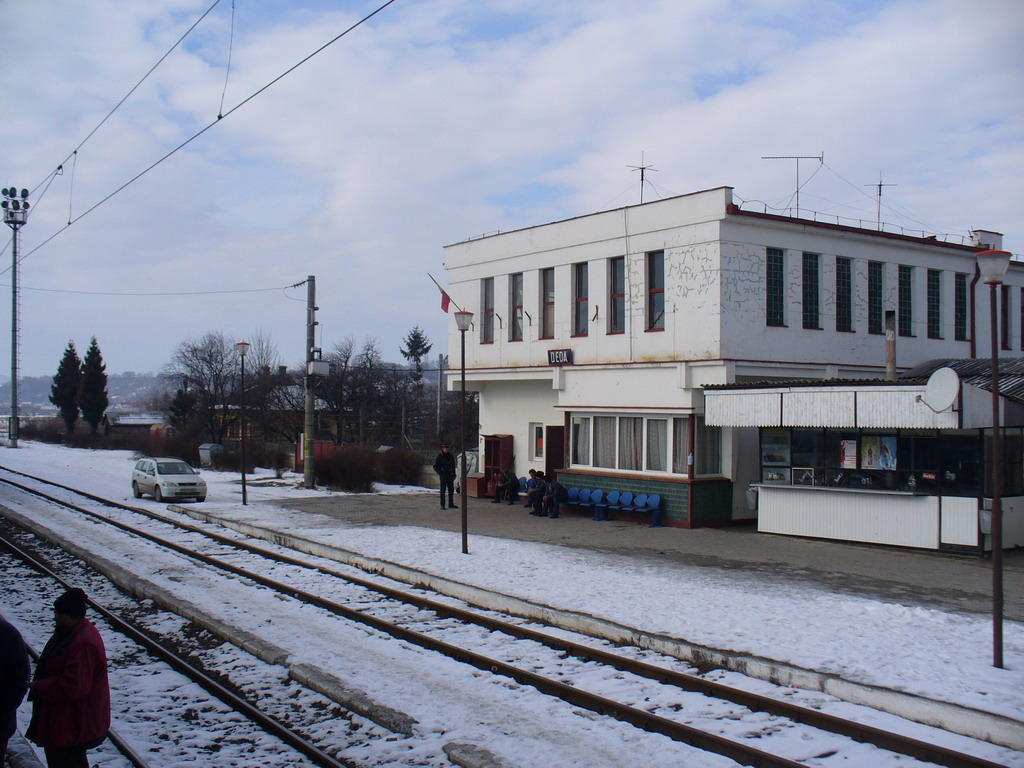
- The Deda train station

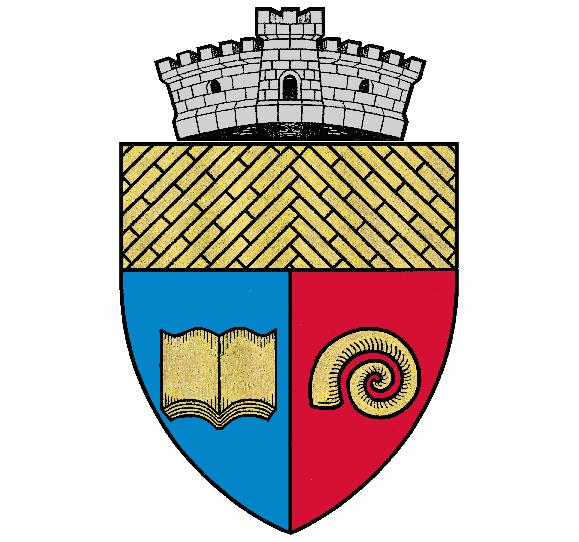
- Coat of arms

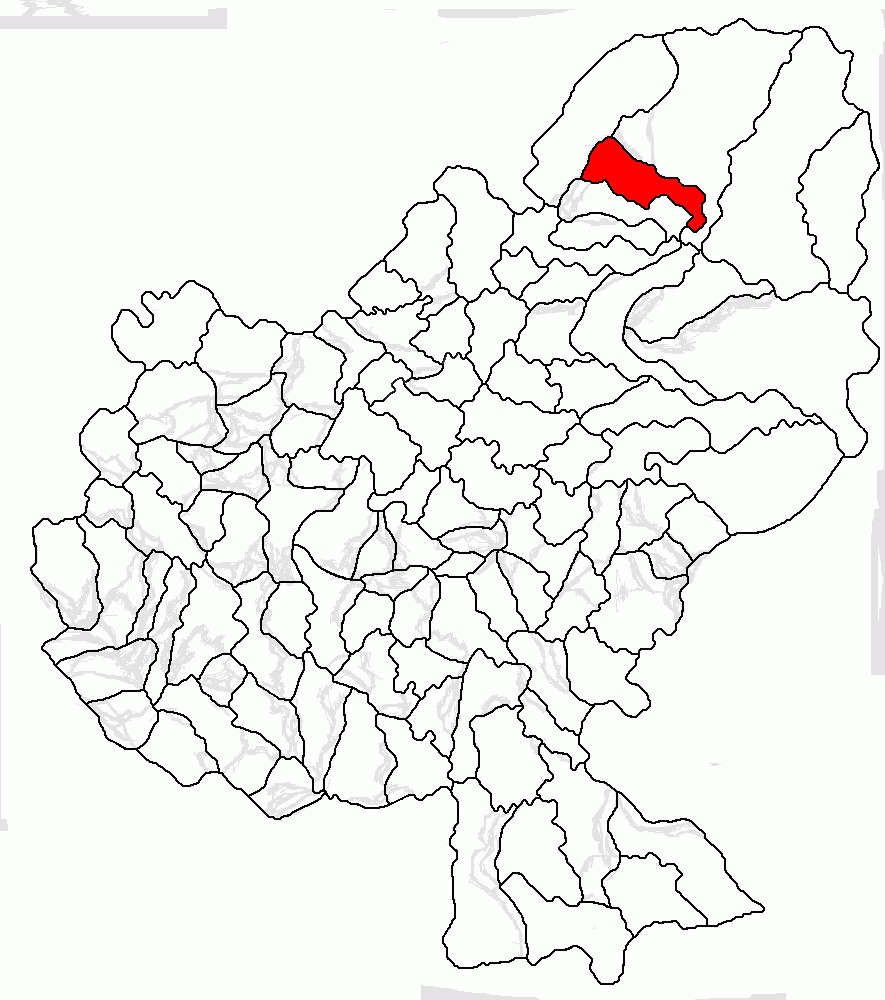
- Location in Mureș County

- Location in Romania
- Coordinates: 46°56′N 24°54′E
- Country: Romania
- County: Mureș

Government
  - Mayor (2020–2024): Lucreția Cadar (PSD)
- Area: 97.70 km^{2} (37.72 sq mi)
- Elevation: 466 m (1,529 ft)
- Population (2021-12-01): 3,933
  - Density: 40.26/km^{2} (104.3/sq mi)
- Time zone: UTC+02:00 (EET)
  - Summer (DST): UTC+03:00 (EEST)
- Postal code: 547205
- Area code: (+40) 02 65
- Vehicle reg.: MS
- Website: primariadeda.ro

Deda (Hungarian: Déda, Hungarian pronunciation: [deːdɒ]) is a commune in Mureș County, Transylvania, Romania. It is composed of four villages: Bistra Mureșului (Dédabisztra), Deda, Filea (Füleháza) and Pietriș (Maroskövesd).

== Location ==
The commune lies on the Transylvanian Plateau, at an altitude of 466 m (1,529 ft). It is situated at the feet of the Călimani Mountains, at the point where the Mureș River exits a gorge beginning at Toplița. The Casele Creek flows in the town into the Mureș. Deda is located in the northeastern part of Mureș County, 25 km (16 mi) from the city of Reghin and 57 km (35 mi) from the county seat, Târgu Mureș.

Deda is an important railway junction, linking the CFR Line 405 to Târgu Mureș with the CFR Main Line 400 connecting Brașov and Dej. The commune is crossed by national road DN15 (on this section, part of European route E578), which runs from Turda in Cluj County to Târgu Mureș and on to Bacău in Western Moldavia.

The Defileul Mureșului Superior Natural Park is partly located on the territory of the commune.

== History ==
The village of Deda was first documented in 1393, under its current name.

== Population ==
Historical population
Year	Pop.	±%
1850	1,898	—
1880	3,188	+68.0%
1900	3,975	+24.7%
1910	4,488	+12.9%
1930	5,388	+20.1%
1956	4,463	−17.2%
1977	4,933	+10.5%
1992	4,383	−11.1%
2002	4,332	−1.2%
2011	4,113	−5.1%
2021	3,933	−4.4%
Source: Census data

In 2002 the commune numbered 4,332 inhabitants, including 4,001 ethnic Romanians, 261 Roma, and 68 Hungarians. At the 2011 census, there were 4,113 inhabitants; of those, 88.14% were Romanians, 8.49% Roma, and 1.05% Hungarians. At the 2021 census, Deda had a population of 3,933, of which 79.3% were Romanians and 14.82% Roma.

== Natives ==
- Vasile Netea (1912 – 1989), writer and historian

== See also ==
- List of Hungarian exonyms (Mureș County)
