= Diocese of Covasna and Harghita =

Diocese of the Romanian Orthodox Church

The Diocese of Covasna and Harghita (Romanian: Episcopia Covasnei și Harghitei) is a diocese of the Romanian Orthodox Church. Its see is the Saint Nicholas Cathedral in Miercurea Ciuc and its ecclesiastical territory covers Covasna and Harghita counties. The diocese forms part of the Metropolis of Transylvania. It has two archpriests' districts, around 110 priests in 140 churches, of which 47 are historic monuments, eight monasteries and two sketes with around 130 monks, and classes for theological education at a high school in Toplița. It was established in 1994.

== Bishops ==
- Ioan Selejan (1994–2014)
- Andrei Moldovan (2015–)
