= Reghin Lutheran Church =

Church in the Transylvania region of Romania

Coordinates: 46°46′43″N 24°42′13″E

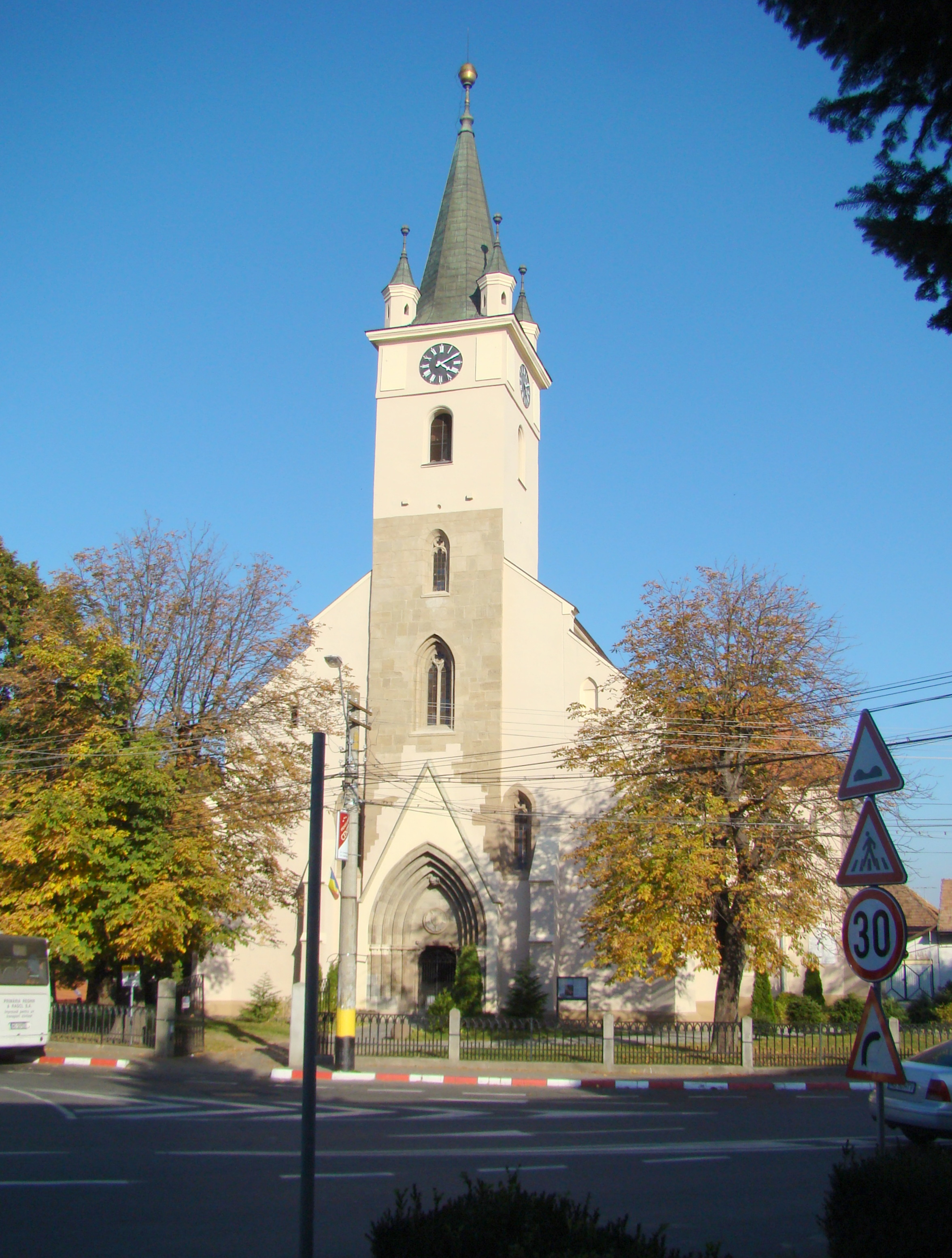
Reghin Lutheran church

The Reghin Lutheran church is a Lutheran church located at 1 Călărașilor Street in Reghin, itself situated in Mureș County, in the Transylvania region of Romania. The church was built by the ethnic German Transylvanian Saxon community at a time when the area belonged to the Kingdom of Hungary. Initially Roman Catholic, it became Lutheran following the Reformation.

The oldest building in the city, it was completed in 1330, as attested by a stone inscription in Latin, the earliest such carving on a medieval Transylvanian church. Valuable architectural elements include a Gothic window frame from 1400 decorated with human figures; corbels unique to the region that describe a treasure hidden inside; and the city’s first coat of arms, inscribed O.P.R. (Latin for Oppidum Privilegiatum Regun), confirming its privilege to hold fairs. The tower, 47 meters high and flanked by four smaller towers, attests Reghin’s power to pass judgment.

During its history, the church was given a number of architectural styles. The buttresses and ogival arches are Gothic, while the sun-shaped windows are typical of the Teutonic Order. The date 1551, carved high up, marks the conversion to Protestantism. Near the entrance, a memorial tablet commemorates the Saxon soldiers who died in World War I while fighting in the Austro-Hungarian Army.

The church was burned during Rákóczi's War of Independence (1703–1711), and its current appearance dates to the reign of Maria Theresa or Joseph II. The lateral porticoes are from 1791, while the nave ceiling and tower extension were finished in 1803. The church again went up in flames during the 1848 Revolution; repairs lasted until 1851. The last grand renovation took place in 1927–1930.

The church is listed as a historic monument by Romania's Ministry of Culture and Religious Affairs, as is the 1670 parish house.

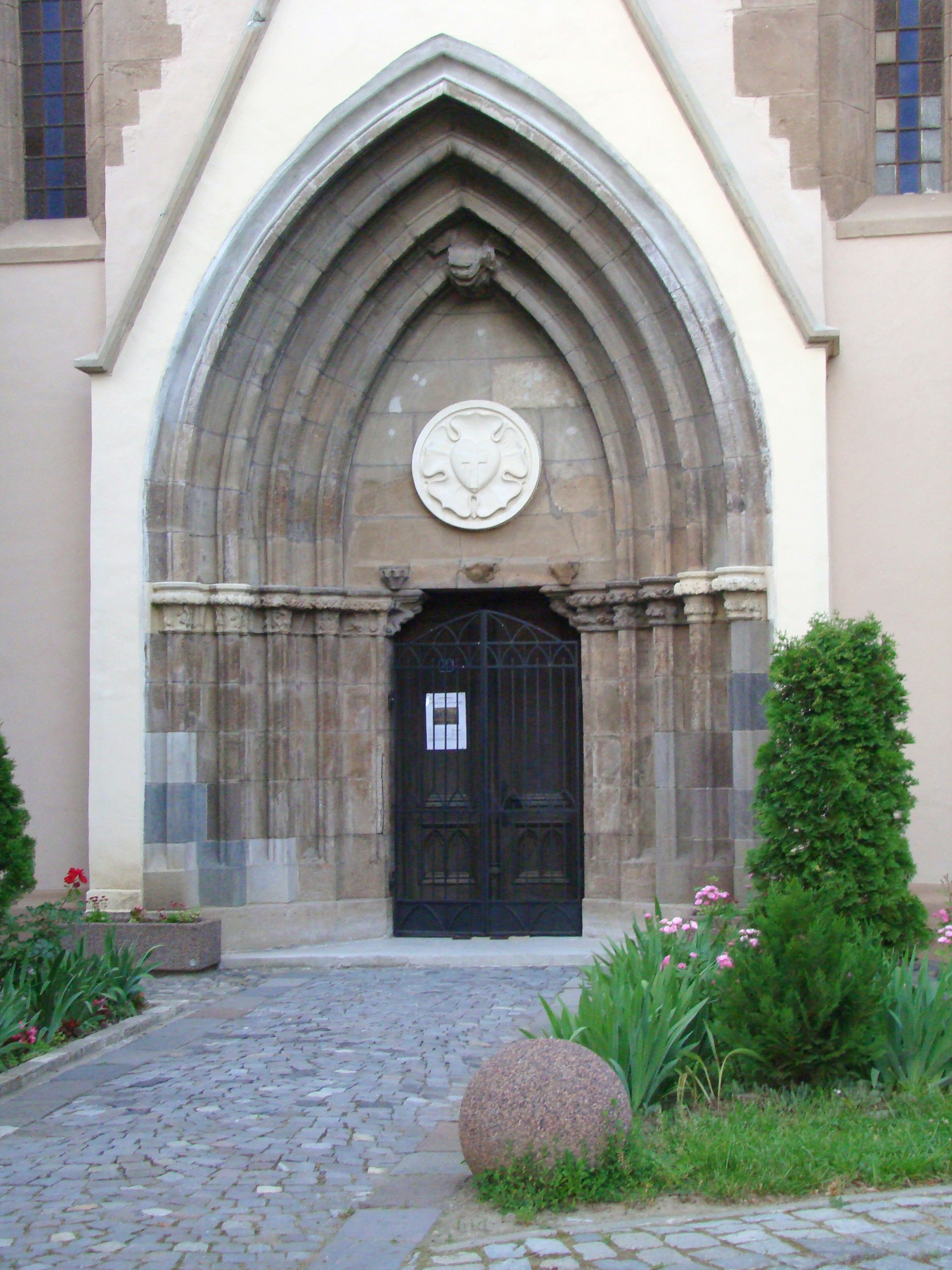
Portal

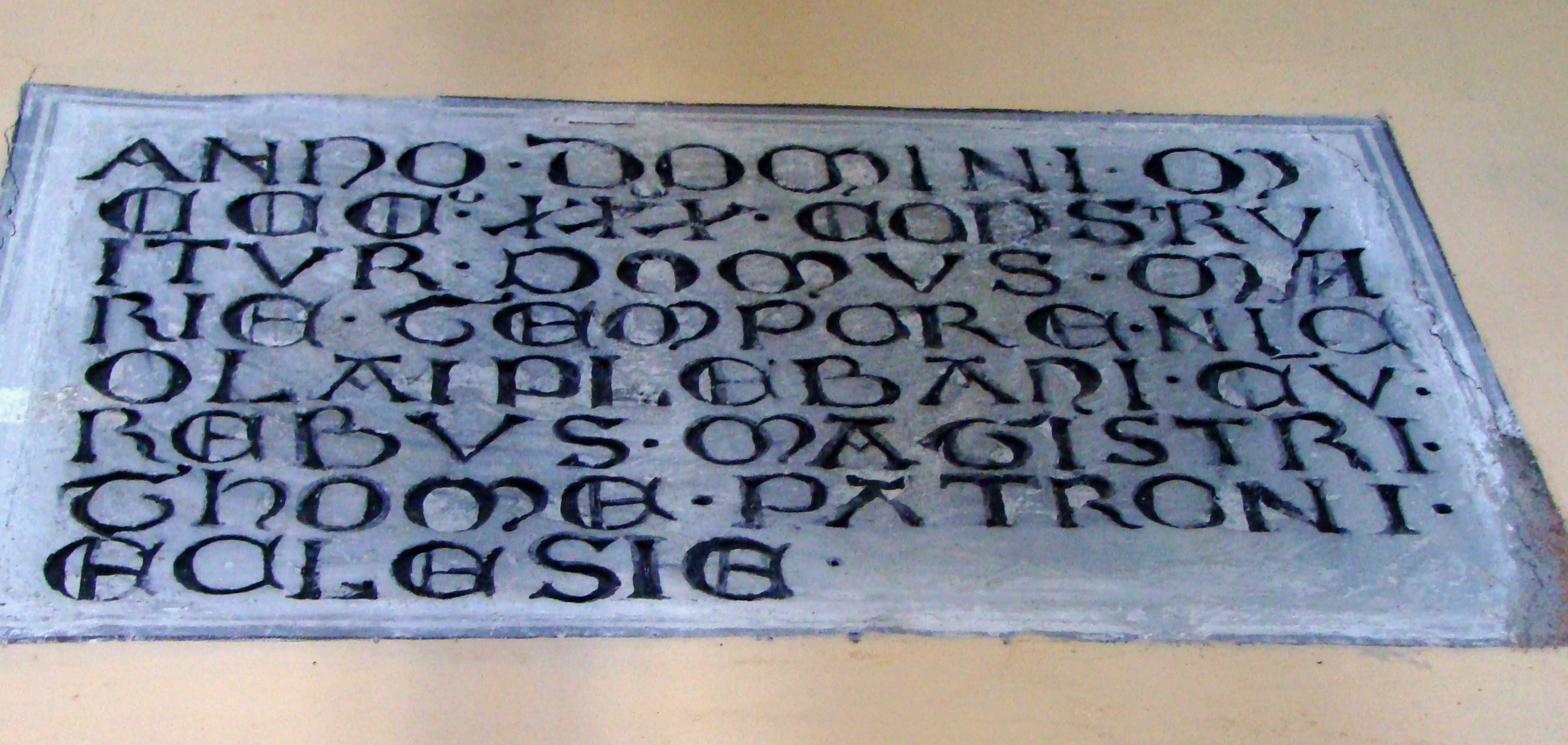
1330 inscription

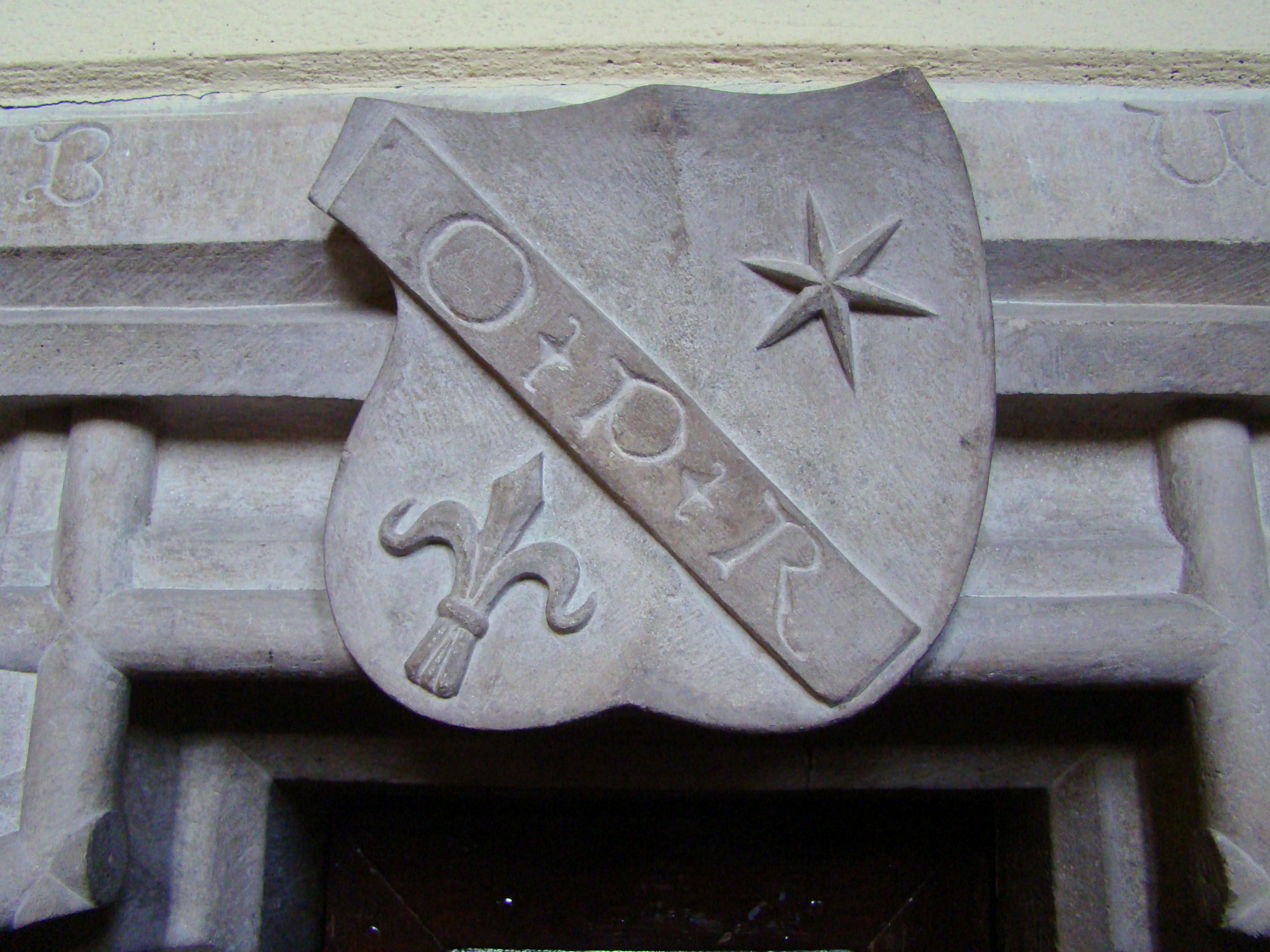
Medieval coat of arms

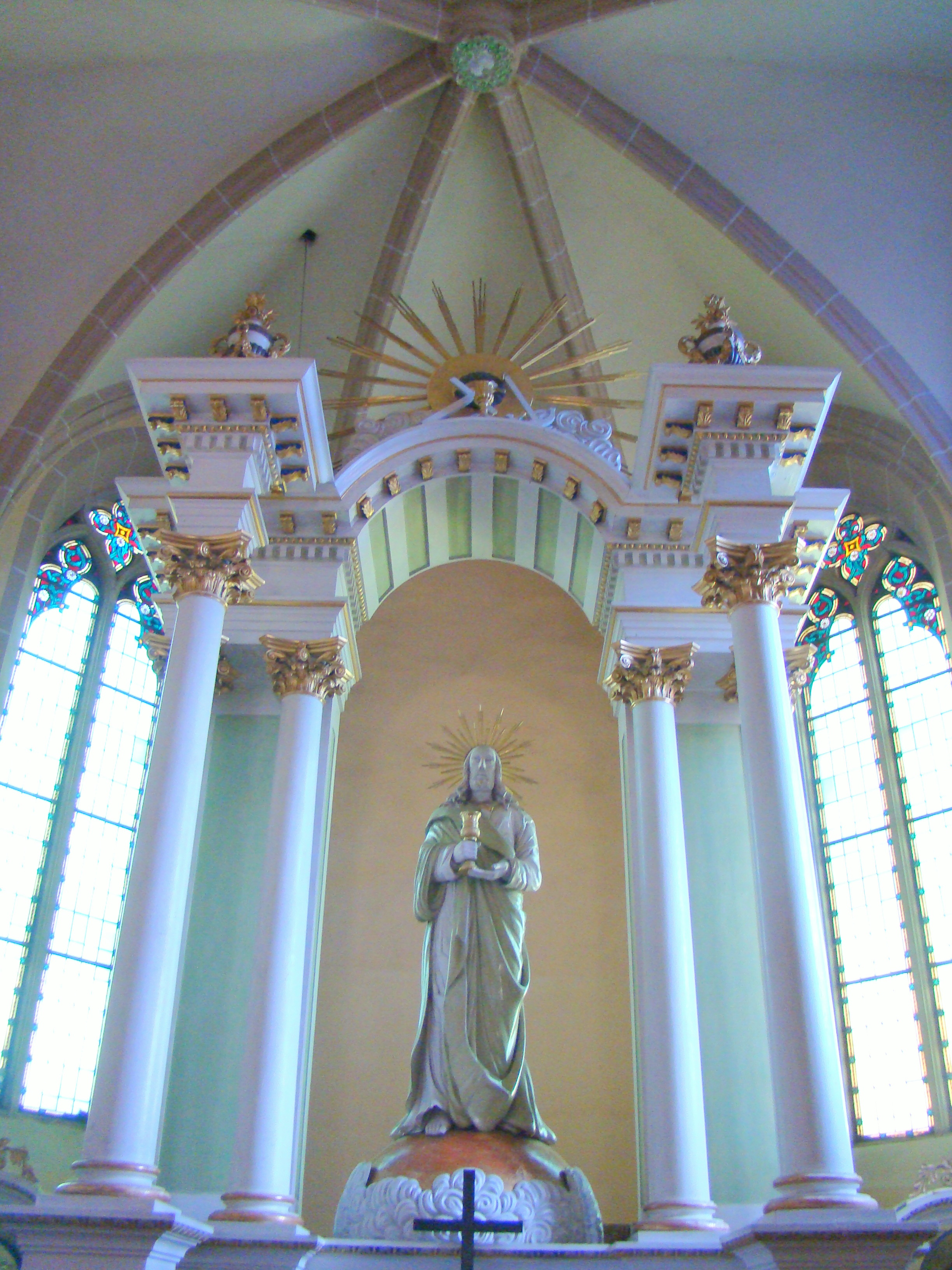
Altar

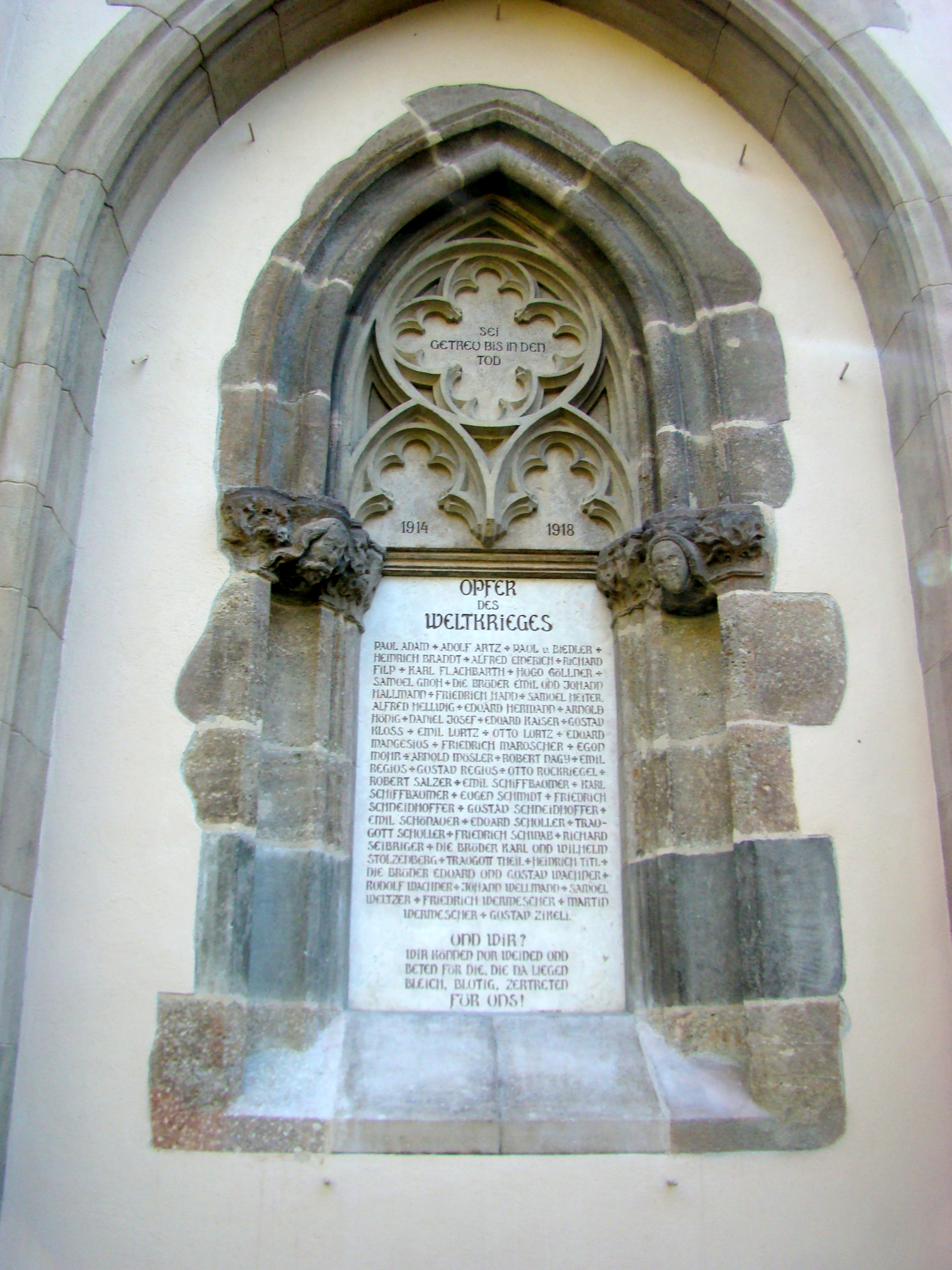
World War I memorial
