= Iod (river) =

Iod Jád-patak
- Location within Romania

Location
- Country: Romania
- Counties: Mureș County
- Villages: Iod

Physical characteristics
- Source: Gurghiu Mountains
- Mouth: Mureș
  - location: Iod
  - coordinates: 46.9737°N 24.9811°E
- Length: 13 km (8.1 mi)
- Basin size: 28 km^{2} (11 sq mi)

Basin features
- Progression: Mureș→ Tisza→ Danube→ Black Sea

The Iod River (Hungarian: Jád-patak) is a left tributary of the Mureș River in Transylvania, Romania. It flows into the Mureș in the village of Iod. It is 13 km (8.1 mi) with a basin size of 28 km^{2} (11 sq mi).
