= Wooden Church, Reghin =

Orthodox church in Reghin, Romania

Coordinates: 46.7869°N 24.7071°E

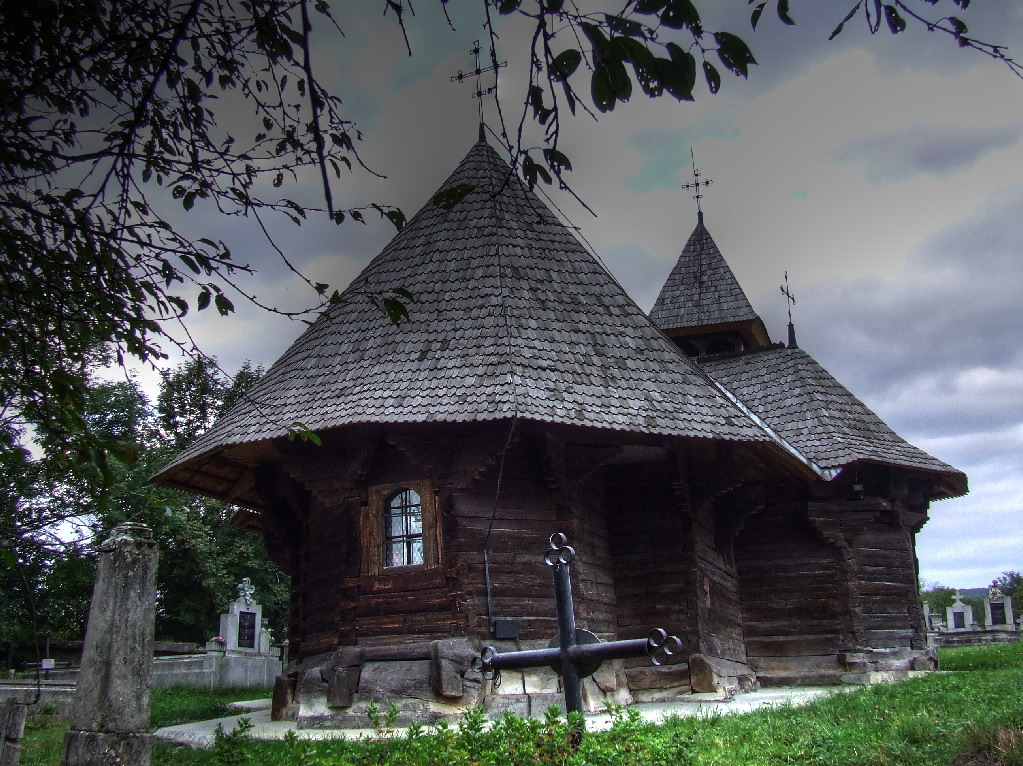
Reghin Wooden Church

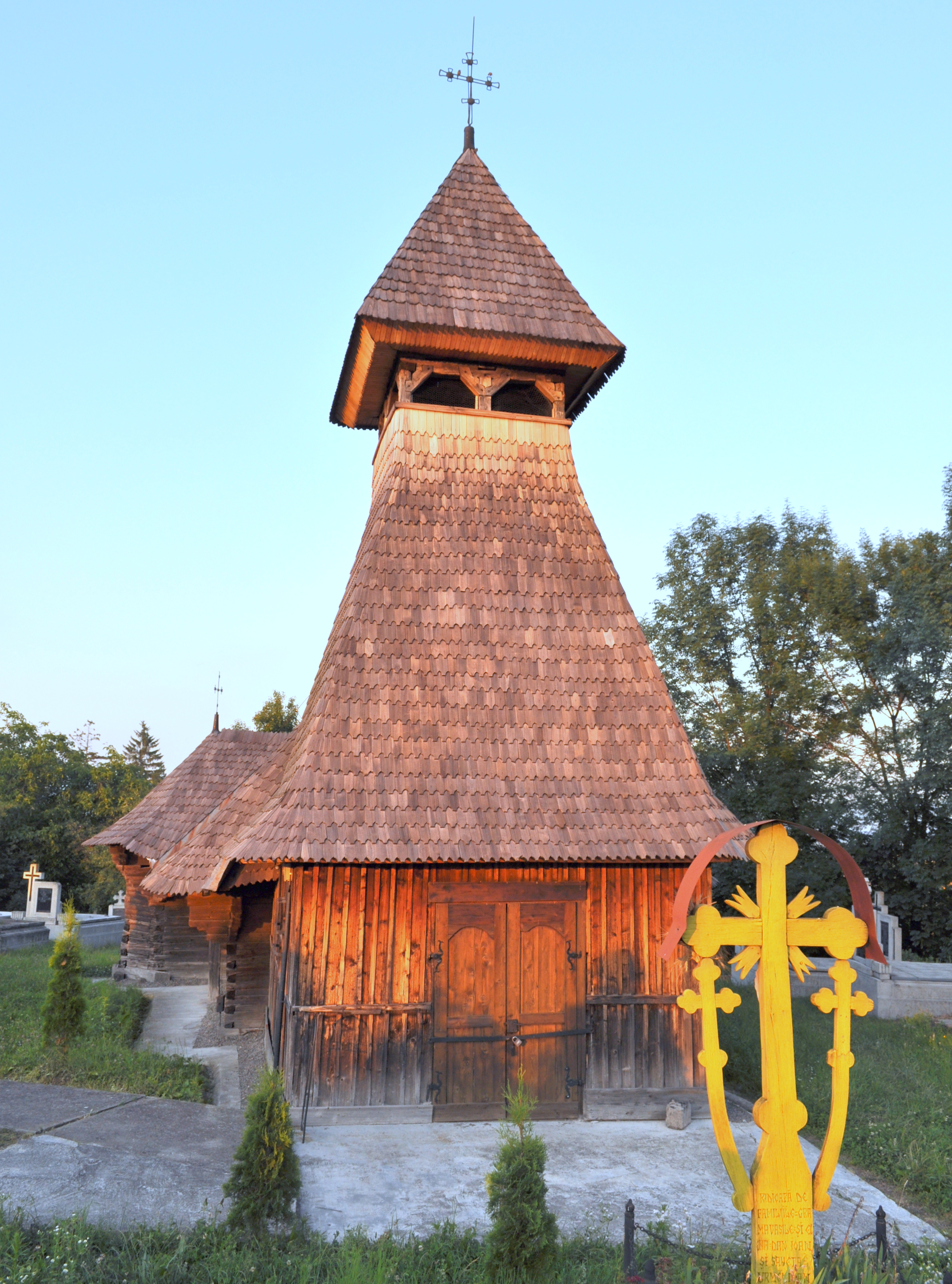
Entrance

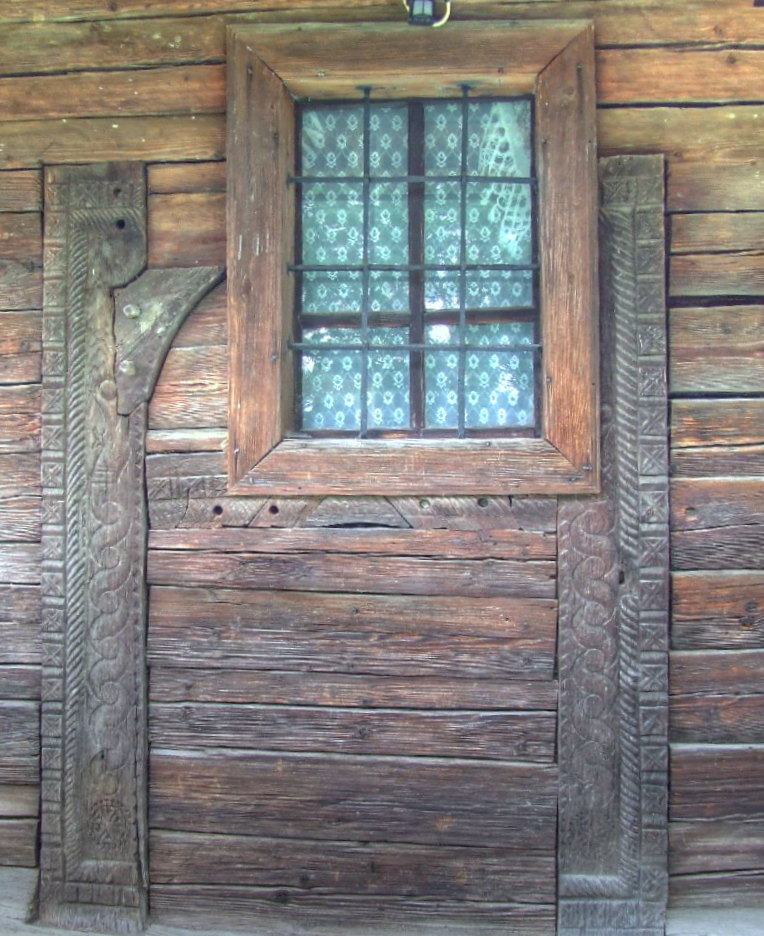
Old door

The Wooden Church is a Romanian Orthodox church located at 5 Măcieșului Street in Reghin, Romania. It is dedicated to Saint Nicholas.

== History ==
The church is situated on the former edge of the city’s Hungarian section, upon a hill. Tradition holds that it originated in the 17th century, while its current form dates to the 18th. At the time, the local Romanian population was joined by affluent Aromanians coming from Cluj, Brașov and elsewhere, who were interested in raising a church. The cruciform shape, rare for Transylvania, indicates a Moldavian influence. The ties between that region and northern Transylvania were strong, and nearly all Moldavian wooden churches have a similar form. A legend even holds that the church was physically brought from Moldavia by Aromanian merchants.

A list compiled by Romanian Greek-Catholic Bishop Inocențiu Micu-Klein indicates no church or priest in Reghin. A construction date of ca. 1744 has been proposed; as has 1725. The project drew opposition from the locally dominant Transylvanian Saxons. It has also been suggested that the church was initially Orthodox, but became Greek-Catholic before 1781. In 1784, the Greek-Catholic Petru Maior arrived as parish priest; he left under pressure in 1809.

The church is built of fir beams, without mortar. The thick foundation wood, 60 centimeters wide, is made of oak. The polygonal altar, narrower than the nave, has seven faces, unusually for a wooden church. The northern and southern faces are larger, in order to expand the interior, some 4 meters wide and nearly as long. The first renovation took place in 1760, when the iconostasis was renewed. In 1791, Maior built a porch topped by a bell tower; the original structure had no spire, while the bell was separate. He added a door on the west, enclosing the old one in beams, cutting a fairly large window inside.

The old door, on the south side, features artistic carvings. As the window has a more modern frame, it conceivably dates to the 1857 renovation. The nave has side apses with spherical vaulted ceilings and five faces each; it is unknown whether the area was originally painted. The initial structure had no narthex, only altar and nave; the latter measured 6 x 10 meters, including the apses. These were 3 x 2 meters, and used as choirs. The cross shape was completed by the porch, its “foot”. The total length is 15 meters, with a height of 13-14.

Renovations are known to have taken place in 1760, 1791, 1857, 1957 and 1982. In 1948, the new communist regime outlawed the Greek-Catholic Church and transferred the building to Orthodox possession, which lay abandoned until 1985. There is a single roof, which has three faces above the altar. The spire is fairly low, only rising slightly above the roof. It is not decorated, and the tip is a small square pyramid, unlike the usual octagonal shape. The structure is somewhat wider than it is tall. Two bells are inscribed 1790 and 1791, respectively, from the time of Maior.

== Iconography ==
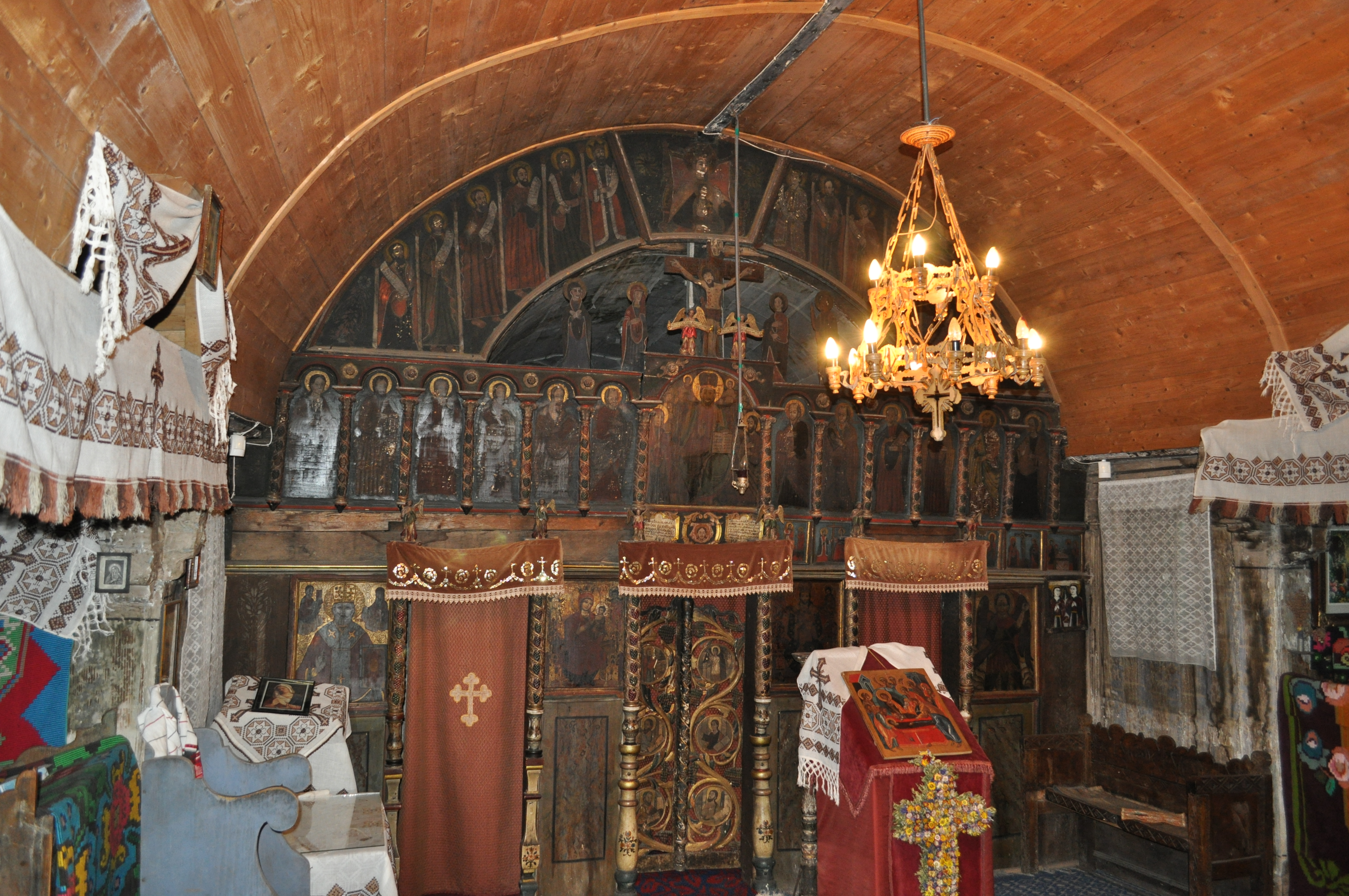
Iconostasis

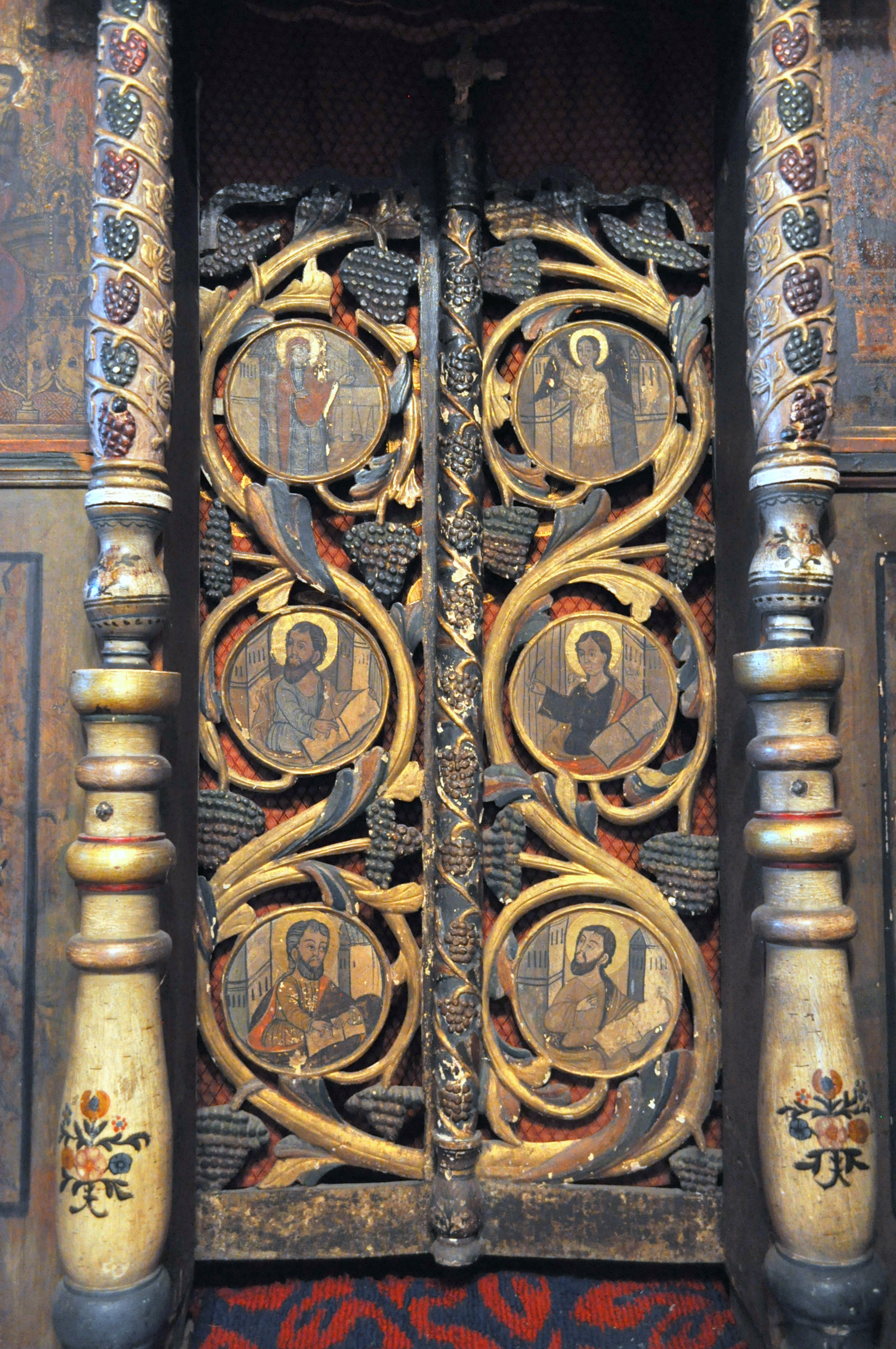
Royal doors

Toader the Painter worked on the interior in 1760; his art survives in the altar and iconostasis. The oldest icon, by another artist and depicting Saint Nicholas, dates to 1744, indicating a likely construction date. A porch icon of the patron saint is also by Toader. The iconostasis front icons are from 1857. A number of saints are depicted in the altar, as well as the Binding of Isaac, a common altar subject. Several prophets are painted in medallions on the reverse of the iconostasis, above the doors. Saints Stephen, Lawrence and Romanus of Caesarea appear between the doors. Toader’s signature is near the north door. The Virgin Mary is shown on the altar ceiling, as well as Saint Anthony the Great. The bishops are depicted wearing peasant costume.

While there is no particular style to Toader’s work, the 18th century icons on the royal doors are in Brâncovenesc style. Fourteen small icons sit atop the doors; one is signed by Toader, indicating that all are by him. The Apostles and Jesus as bishop are by another artist; above them are the Crucifixion, with Mary, John the Apostle and angels. Twelve prophets, with Mary in the center, are painted on the arch leading into the altar. The sides of the royal doors feature the Annunciation of Mary and the Four Evangelists. The church holds a deteriorated Byzantine style icon of Mary; its appearance suggests that parishioners brought it from Bukovina.

By the early 1980s, the church had nearly collapsed due to decades of neglect, and while the structure was saved, Toader’s artwork became badly deteriorated. The church is listed as a historic monument by Romania's Ministry of Culture and Religious Affairs.
