= Defileul Mureșului Superior Natural Park =

Protected area in Romania

Defileul Mureșului Superior Natural Parc
- Parcul Natural Defileul Mureșului Superior
- IUCN category V (protected landscape/seascape)
- Location within Romania
- Location: Romania; Mureș County
- Nearest city: Deda
- Coordinates: 46.962°N 25.092°E
- Area: 9,156 ha (22,620 acres)
- Established: 2007

The Defileul Mureșului Superior Natural Park (Romanian: Parcul Natural Defileul Mureșului Superior; Hungarian: Maros-szoros Natúrpark) is a protected area (natural park category V IUCN) situated in Romania, in Mureș County.

== Location ==
The Natural Park is located in the superior course of the river Mureș, in the administrative territory of Deda, Răstolița, Lunca Bradului, and Stânceni communes, in the north-eastern part of Mureș County.

== Description ==
Defileul Mureșului Superior with an area of 9,156 ha (22,620 acres) was declared natural protected area by the Government Decision Number 1143 on September 18, 2007 (published in Romanian Official Paper Number 691 on October 11, 2007) and represent an area the very tight portions, with volcanic blocks, with high and steep slopes, with flora and fauna specific Eastern Carpathians.

== See also ==
- Protected areas of Romania
