= Răstolița =

- Commune
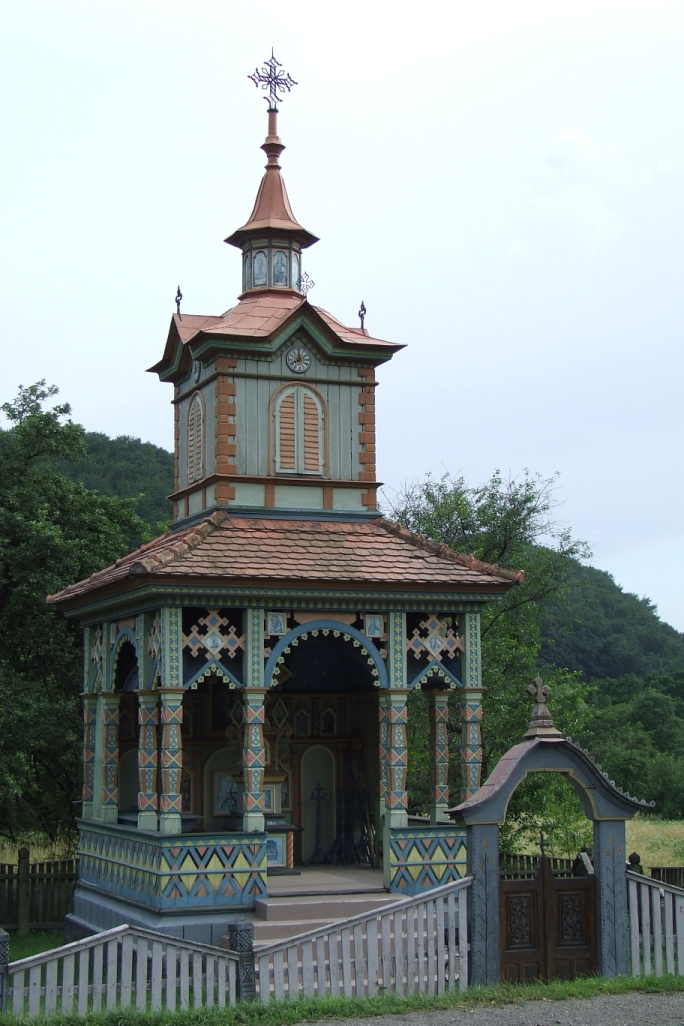
- "Troița" (Holy Trinity) in Gălăoaia

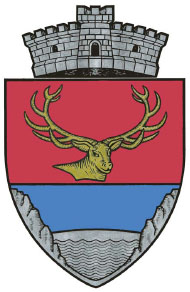
- Coat of arms

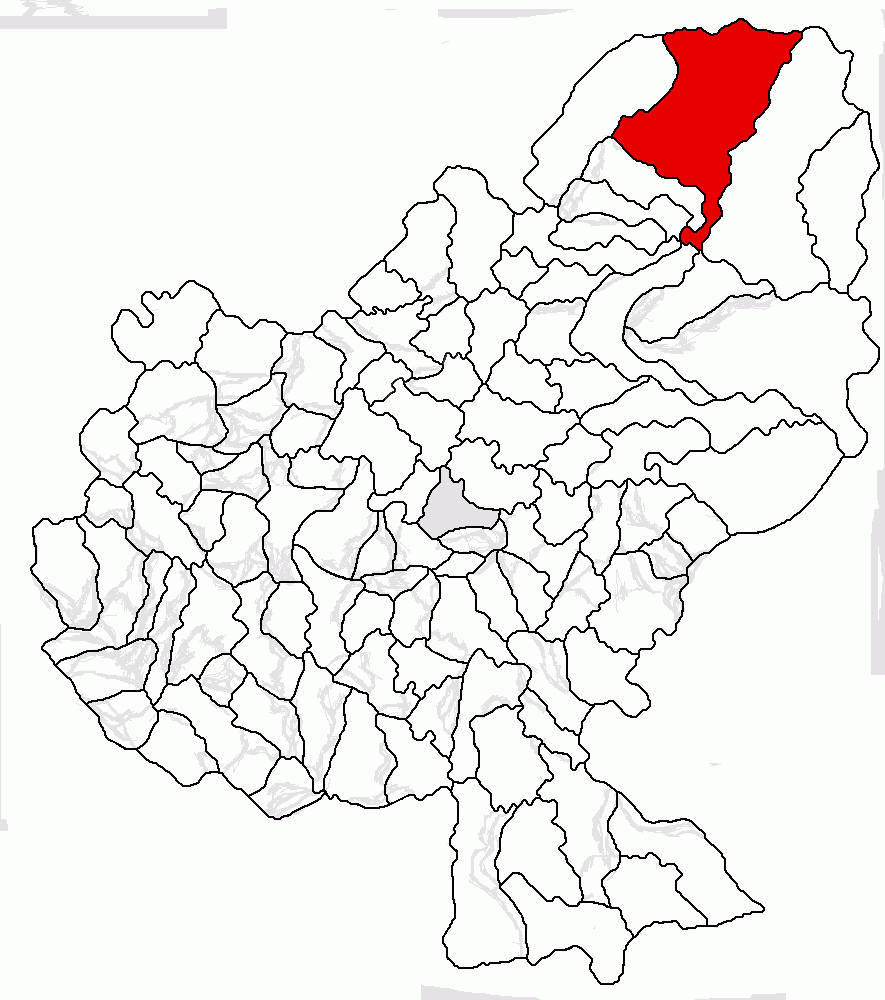
- Location in Mureș County

- Location in Romania
- Coordinates: 46°59′N 25°2′E
- Country: Romania
- County: Mureș

Government
  - Mayor (2020–2024): Marius Ioan Lirca (PSD)
- Area: 260 km^{2} (100 sq mi)
- Elevation: 530 m (1,740 ft)
- Population (2021-12-01): 1,729
  - Density: 6.6/km^{2} (17/sq mi)
- Time zone: UTC+02:00 (EET)
  - Summer (DST): UTC+03:00 (EEST)
- Postal code: 547480
- Area code: (+40) 0265
- Vehicle reg.: MS
- Website: www.comunarastolita.ro

Răstolița (Hungarian: Ratosnya, Hungarian pronunciation: [ˈrɒtoʃɲɒ]) is a commune in Mureș County, Transylvania, Romania that is composed of five villages: Andreneasa (Andrástelep), Borzia (Borzia), Gălăoaia (Galonya), Iod (Jód), and Răstolița.

The commune is located in the northern part of the county, at a distance of 32 km (20 mi) from Toplița, 35.6 km (22.1 mi) from Reghin, and 67.6 km (42.0 mi) from the county seat, Târgu Mureș. It lies at the foot of the Călimani Mountains and Gurghiu Mountains, on the right bank of the river Mureș. The river Răstolița is a right tributary of the Mureș; it discharges into the Mureș in Răstolița village.

At the 2002 census, Răstolița commune had a population of 2,230: 82% Romanians, 17% Hungarians, and 1% Roma. At the 2021 census, there were 1,729 inhabitants; of those, 82% were Romanians and 13.7% Hungarians.

The wooden church of Răstolița dates from the second half of the 18th century. The Defileul Mureșului Superior Natural Park is partly located on the territory of the commune.

== See also ==
- List of Hungarian exonyms (Mureș County)
