= Toplița =

Toplița Maroshévíz
- Municipality
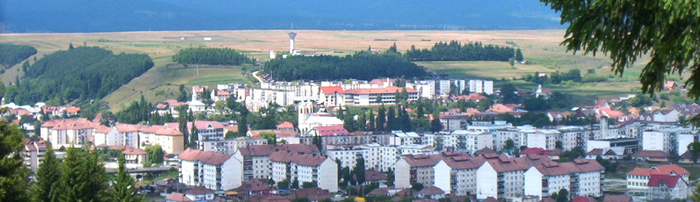
- General view of Toplița

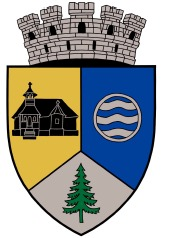
- Coat of arms

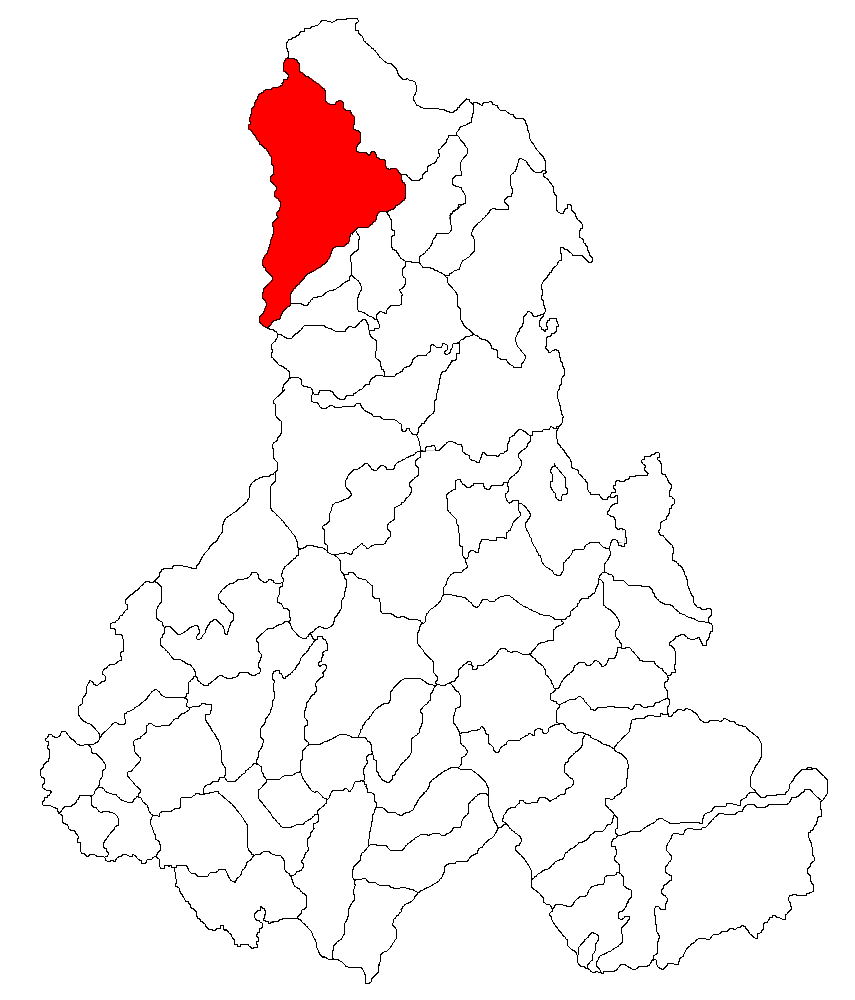
- Location of Toplița in Harghita County

- Location in Romania
- Coordinates: 46°55′25″N 25°20′45″E
- Country: Romania
- County: Harghita

Government
  - Mayor (2024–2028): Victor Sebastian Buzilă (PNL)
- Area: 338.3 km^{2} (130.6 sq mi)
- Elevation: 650 m (2,130 ft)
- Population (2021-12-01): 12,609
  - Density: 37.27/km^{2} (96.53/sq mi)
- Time zone: UTC+02:00 (EET)
  - Summer (DST): UTC+03:00 (EEST)
- Postal code: 535700
- Area code: +(40) 266
- Vehicle reg.: HR
- Website: primariatoplita.ro

Toplița (Romanian pronunciation: [ˈtoplit͡sa]; Hungarian: Maroshévíz, Hungarian pronunciation: [ˈmɒroʃheːviːz]) is a city in Harghita County, Transylvania, Romania.

The settlement has had multiple name changes: Taplócza, Toplicza, Gyergyó-Toplicza, from 3 February 1861 Oláh-Toplicza, or "Romanian Toplița", then from 1 January 1907 Maroshévíz, until 1918, when it received the Romanian name Toplița Română. Topliță is a Romanian word of Slavic origin and has the same meaning as the Hungarian word hévíz: "hot water spring".

The city administers eight villages: Călimănel (Kelemenpatak), Luncani (Lunkány), Măgheruș (Magyaros), Moglănești (Moglán), Secu (Székpatak), Vâgani (Vugány), Vale (Válya), and Zencani (Zsákhegy).

== Demographics ==
Historical population
Year	Pop.	±%
1956	8,944	—
1966	10,993	+22.9%
1977	13,618	+23.9%
1992	17,212	+26.4%
2002	16,839	−2.2%
2011	13,282	−21.1%
2021	12,609	−5.1%
Source: Census data

At the 2021 census, Toplița had a population of 12,609. At the census from 2011, there were 13,282 people living in the city; of this population, 68.49% were ethnic Romanians, while 22.11% were ethnic Hungarians (primarily Székelys) and 3.64% ethnic Romani.

Among the villages which are part of this municipality, there are large ethnic Hungarian minorities in Măgheruș (34%), Moglănești (21.5%), Secu (29.7%), and Zencani (23.7%).

== Geography ==
Toplița is located in eastern Transylvania, on the upper reaches of the Mureș River, more precisely in the northwestern corner of Harghita County. It is situated at an altitude of 650 m (2,130 ft) above sea level, on the Giurgiului plain between the mountains of Giurgiului, Gurghiului, and Călimani. The nearest towns are Borsec, 26 km (16 mi) to the northeast, Gheorgheni, 38 km (24 mi) to the southeast, and Reghin, 69 km (43 mi) to the southwest.

== History ==
The region was Simon Bán's property until 1228, then passed on to the Bánffy family, who managed to keep their enormous properties until 1945. As a feudal domain, the area was not part of any of the Székely seats (sedes judiciaria, Székely district with special national privileges).

The settlement was founded in 1567 by Kozma Petričević on land owned by Pál Bánffy. He gave the land to three Moldavian peasant families and named the place Taplócza.

In 1658, Gyergyó-Toplicza was entirely destroyed by Moldavian units led by Pintea. After 1660, the Bánffys brought 391 Romanian peasant families from Deda onto these lands. Around 1710, rafting started on the Mureș River. Due to this profitable enterprise, Toplicza and its inhabitants started growing and evolving in both wealth and numbers. The first European census, ordered by Emperor Joseph II, took place in Toplicza on 20 November 1785. Census results showed 227 farms, 23 free and 231 thrall families who belonged to 22 lords. Baron János Bornemissza owned 52 of these families, while Baron Simon Kemény owned 30 and Count Mihály Teleki 18.

In 1868, eight "praedia" belonged to Oláh-Toplicza: Kelemenpatak, Nyírmező, Csobotány, Mănăstirea, Vugány, Moglán, Plopiș, and Magyarós; at the time Válya was already part of the settlement. Nowadays, it comprises Valea, Zencani, Vâgani, Secu, Moglănești, Măgheruș, and Luncani.

During World War I, Toplița and its periphery witnessed cruel fighting. The Romanian monument in Secu is the tomb of 771 Romanian soldiers, while in the Hungarian Soldiers Cemetery 450 Hungarian soldiers were buried. Until 1918 it was part of Maros-Torda County in the Kingdom of Hungary in Austria-Hungary. At the end of November 1918, the 7th Infantry Division of the Romanian Army under the command of General Traian Moșoiu crossed the Carpathian Mountains, coming from Piatra Neamț and advancing though the Prisăcani Valley towards Borsec, Toplița, and Reghin. After the Union of Transylvania with Romania in December 1918 and the start of the Hungarian–Romanian War, Toplița passed under Romanian administration; after the Treaty of Trianon of 1920, it became part of Romania.

In 1940, the Second Vienna Award granted Northern Transylvania to Hungary. Towards the end of World War II, Romanian and Soviet armies entered the town in October 1944. The territory of Northern Transylvania remained under Soviet military administration until 9 March 1945 (after the appointment of Petru Groza as Prime Minister), after which it became again part of Romania.

In 1952 Toplița was declared a town, and became part of the Magyar Autonomous Region. In 1968, it became part of Harghita County. In 2002 it was declared a municipality.

== Buildings ==
- 1658 Mănăstirea Doamnei
- 1847 Toplița Monastery
- 22 September 1867 – 21August 1869 a Roman Catholic church in the vicinity of an old wooden church
- 1867–1903 Romanian Orthodox Church
- 1870 Roman Catholic Denominational School
- 1895 Calvinist Church
- 1896 Hungarian State School, founded in the Valea section
- 1903–1907 Urmánczy castle, today the town's Ethnographic Museum
- 1928–1929 Greek Catholic Church in the Cornișa section, built to replace the 1777 wooden church which was moved to the nearby Gălăuțaș village.

== Natives ==
- Miron Cristea (1868–1939), the first Patriarch of the Romanian Orthodox Church, and the Prime Minister of Romania between 1938 and 1939
- Mircea Dușa (1955–2022), politician, Minister of National Defense
- Endre Pálfy (1925–1975), writer
- Gunther Philipp (Placheta) (1918–2003), actor
- George Sbârcea (1914–2005), composer
- Ionuț Țăran (born 1987), luger
- Marius Urzică (born 1975), gymnast
