= Reghin =

Reghin Szászrégen
- Municipality
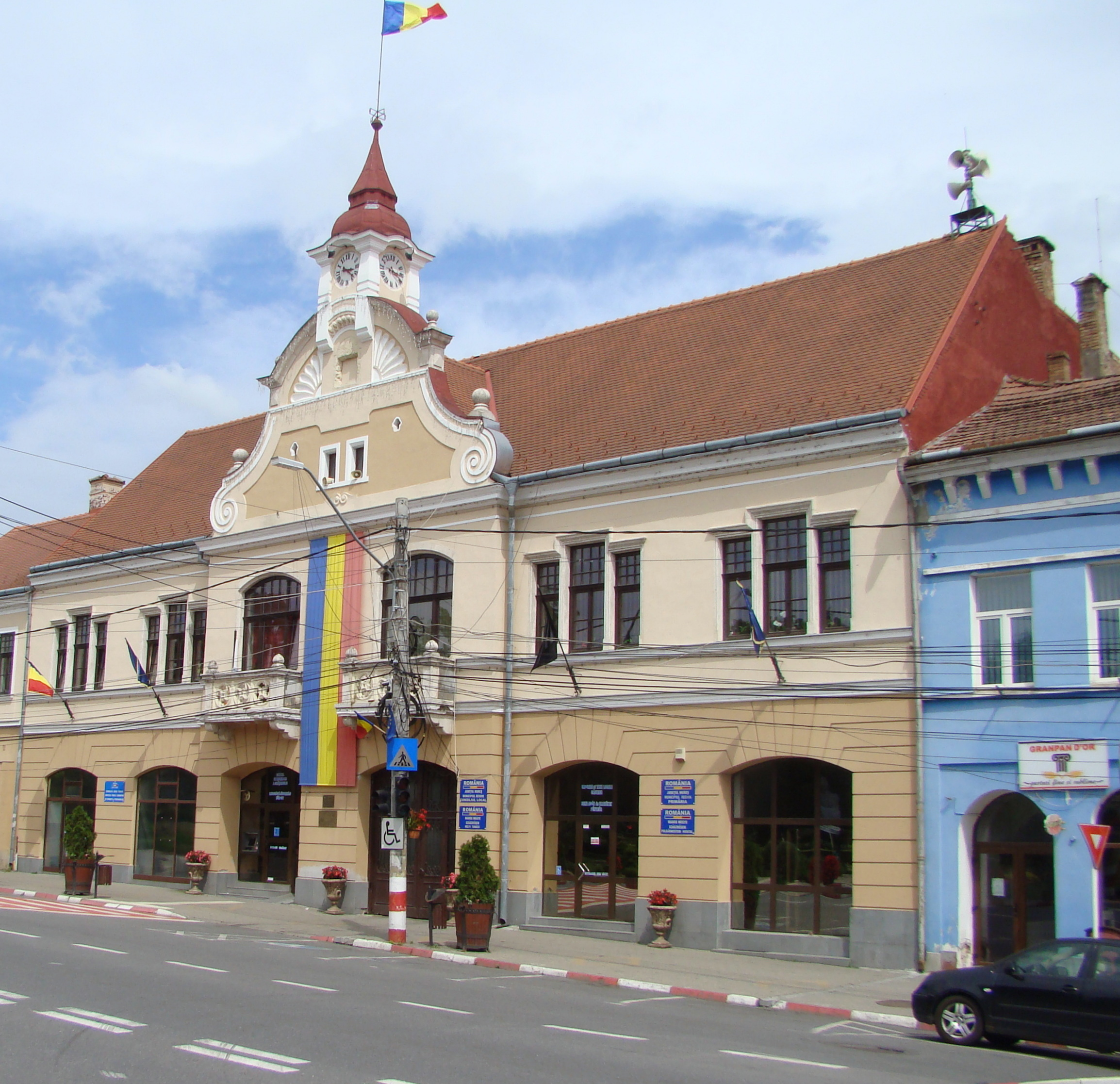
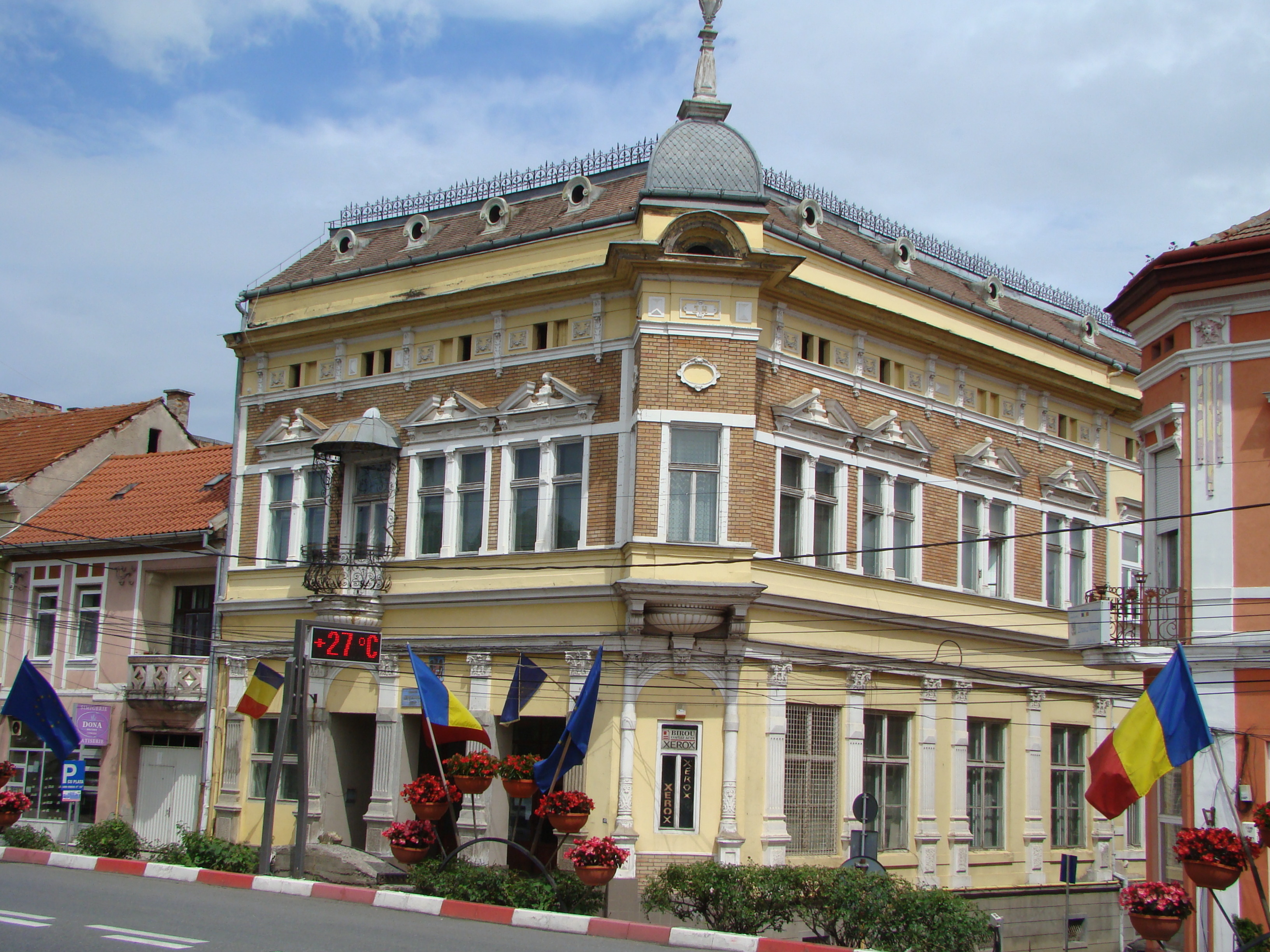
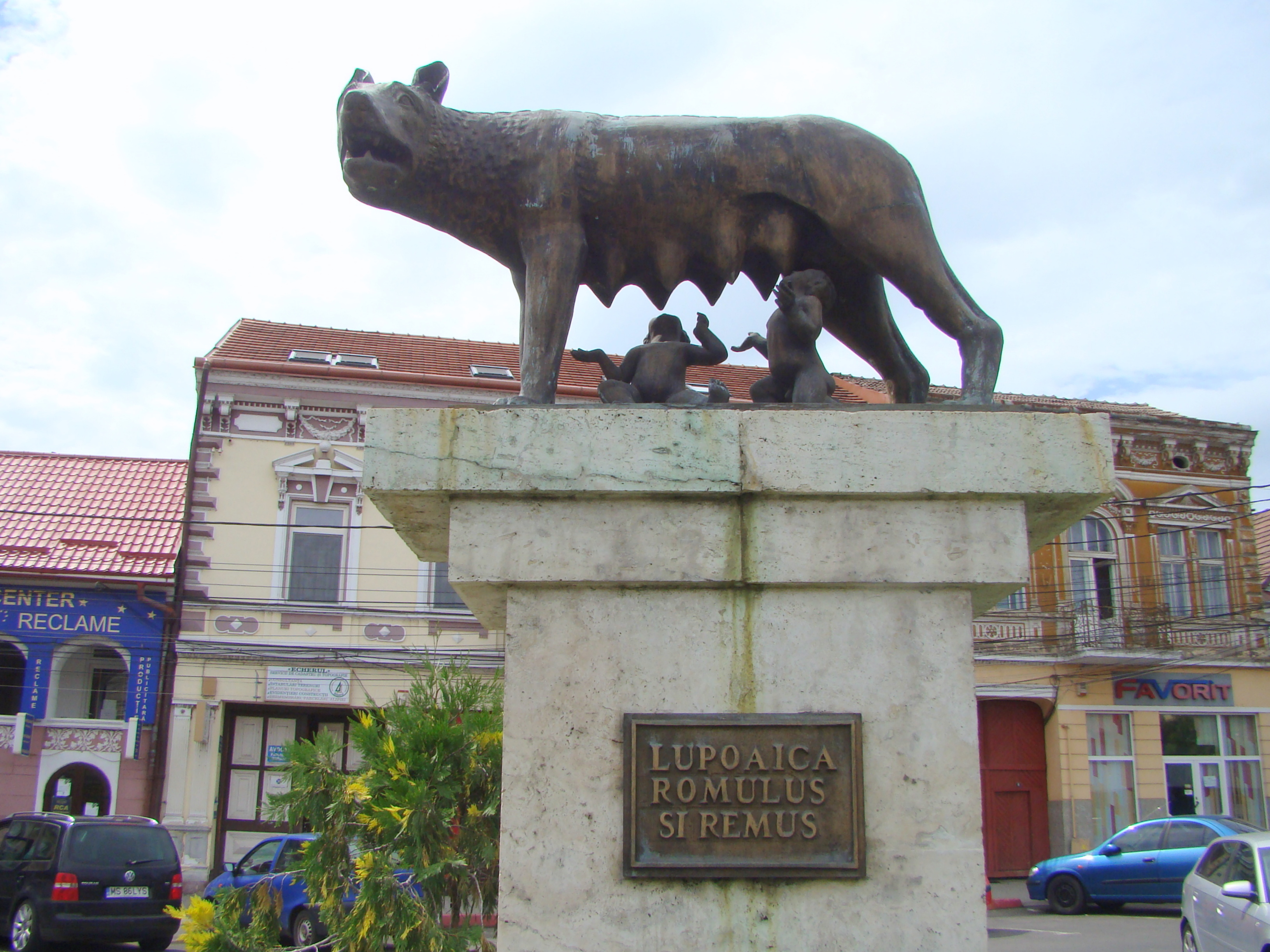
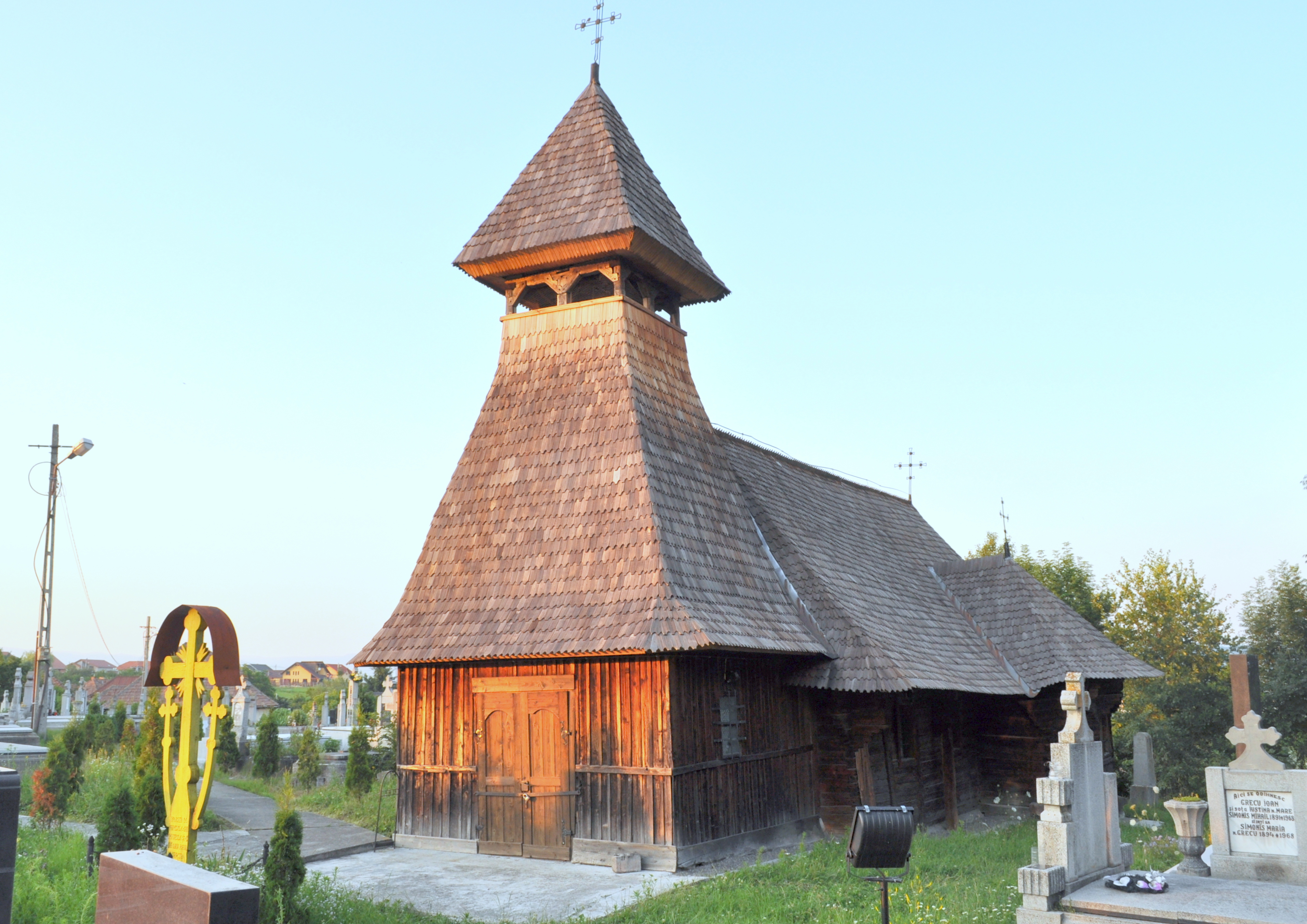
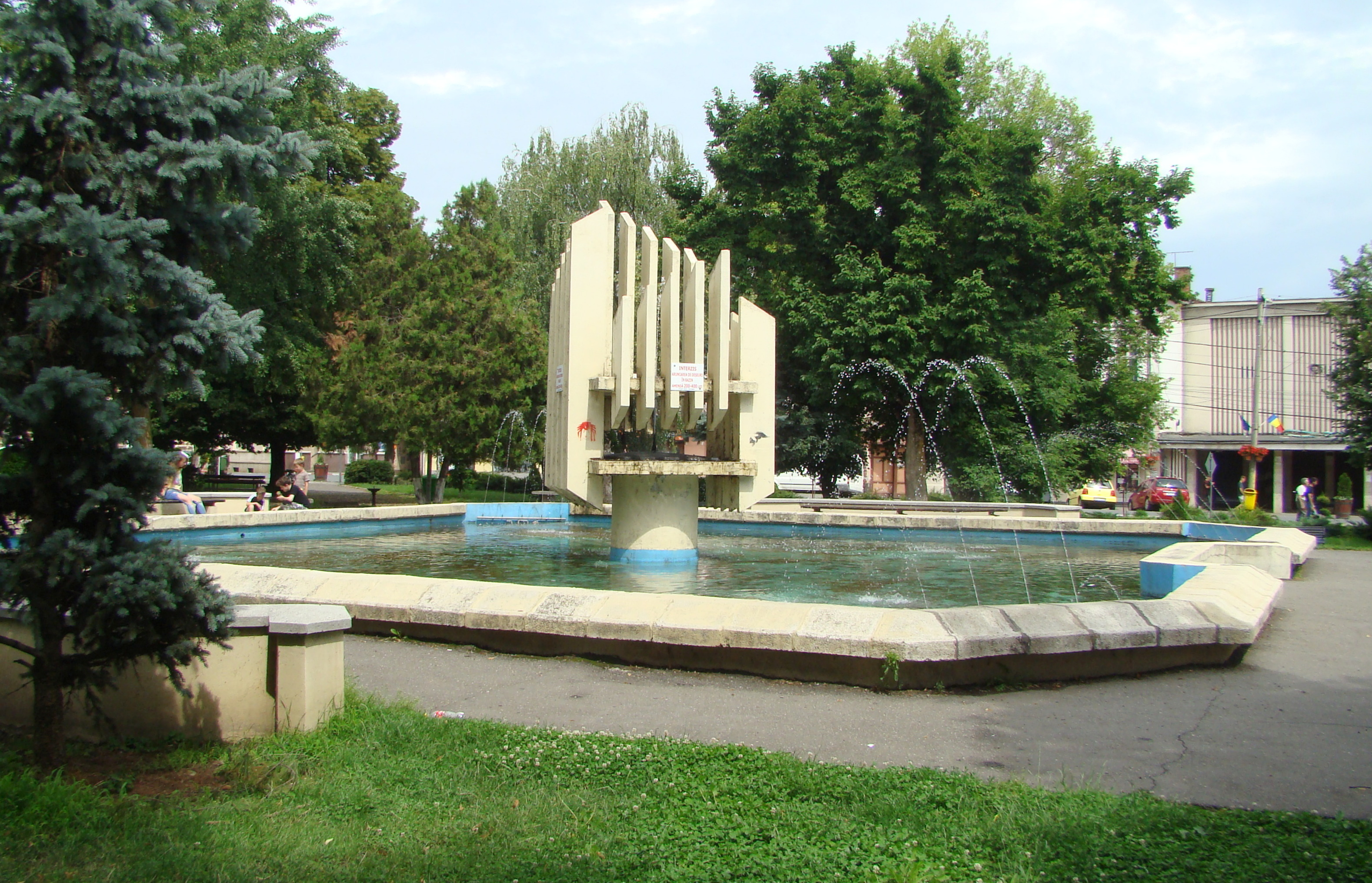
- Reghin City Hall "Petru Maior" urban ensemble Capitoline Wolf statue Wooden church of the Archangels Fountain in Central Park

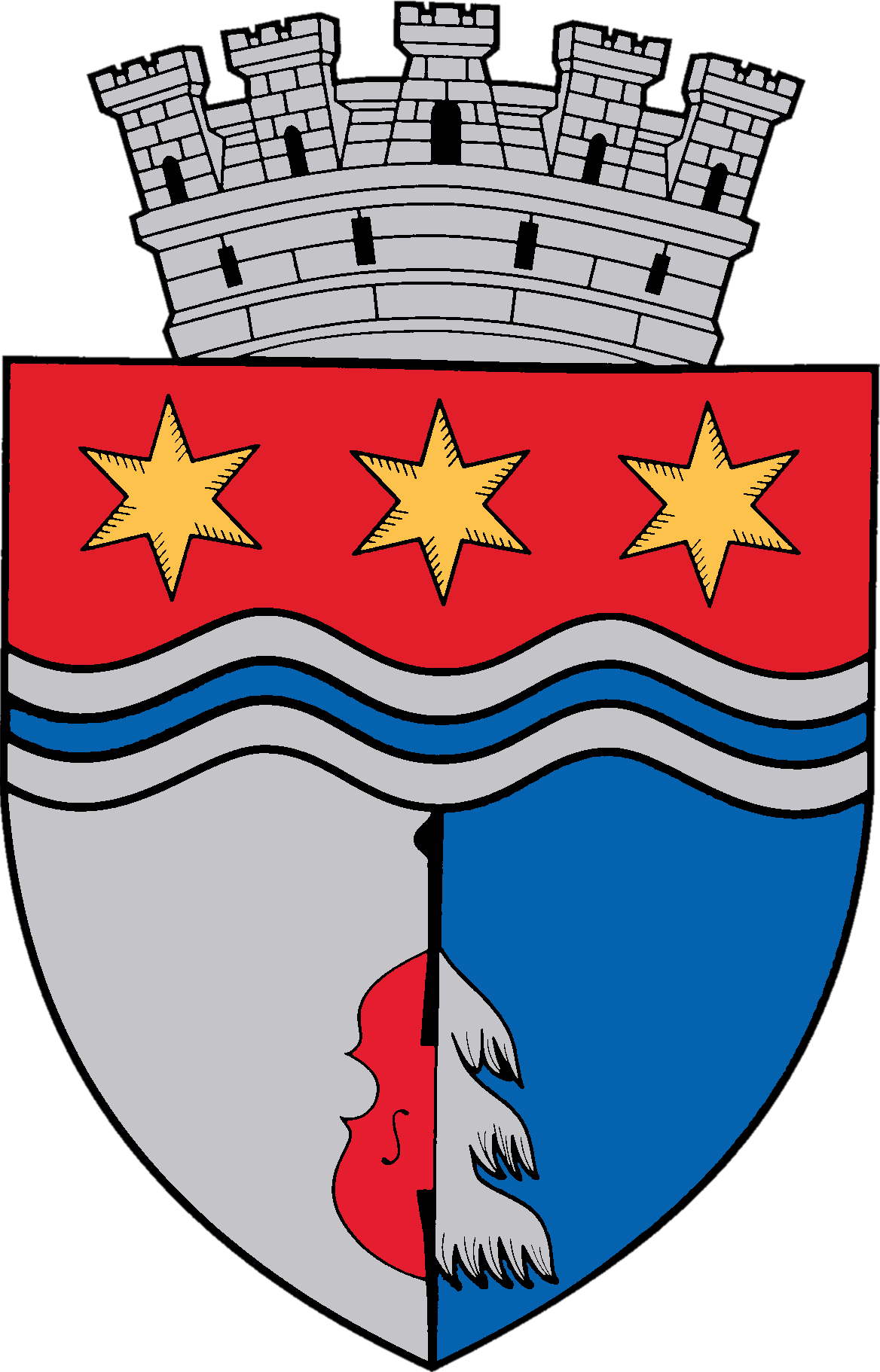
- Coat of arms

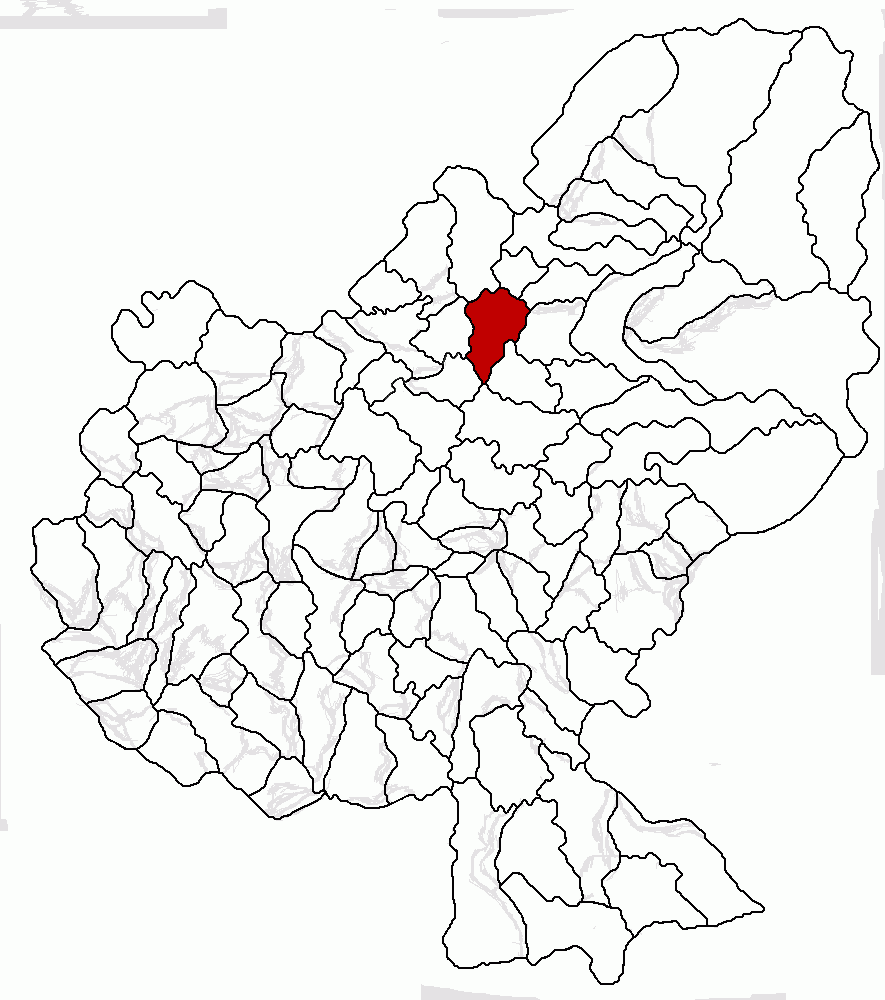
- Location in Mureș County

- Location in Romania
- Coordinates: 46°46′33″N 24°42′30″E
- Country: Romania
- County: Mureș

Government
  - Mayor (2024–2028): Endre Dezső Márk (UDMR)
- Area: 72.82 km^{2} (28.12 sq mi)
- Elevation: 395 m (1,296 ft)
- Highest elevation: 455 m (1,493 ft)
- Lowest elevation: 350 m (1,150 ft)
- Population (2021-12-01): 29,742
  - Density: 408.4/km^{2} (1,058/sq mi)
- Time zone: UTC+02:00 (EET)
  - Summer (DST): UTC+03:00 (EEST)
- Postal code: 545300
- Area code: (+40) 02 65
- Vehicle reg.: MS
- Website: www.primariareghin.ro

Reghin (Romanian pronunciation: [ˈreɡin]; Hungarian: Szászrégen, Hungarian pronunciation: [ˈsaːsreːɡɛn] or Régen; German: (Sächsisch) Regen or Sächsisch-Reen; Transylvanian Saxon: Reen) is a city in Mureș County, Transylvania, central Romania, on the Mureș River. As of 2021, it had a population of 29,742, making it the second biggest city of the Mureș county, just behind the capital Târgu Mureș and ahead of Sighișoara.

== Location ==
Reghin lies 32 km (20 mi) north-northeast of Târgu Mureș, extending on both shores of the river Mureș, at the confluence with the Gurghiu River. It was created by the 1926 union of the German-inhabited (formerly Szászrégen) and the Hungarian-inhabited (formerly Magyarrégen) city, and later joined with the two smaller communities of Apalina (Hungarian: Abafája; German: Bendorf) and Iernuțeni (Hungarian: Radnótfája; German: Etschdorf), added in 1956. Formally, the latter two are separate villages administered by the city.

The city is on the Târgu Mureș–Deda–Gheorgheni Romanian Railways line 405.

== History ==
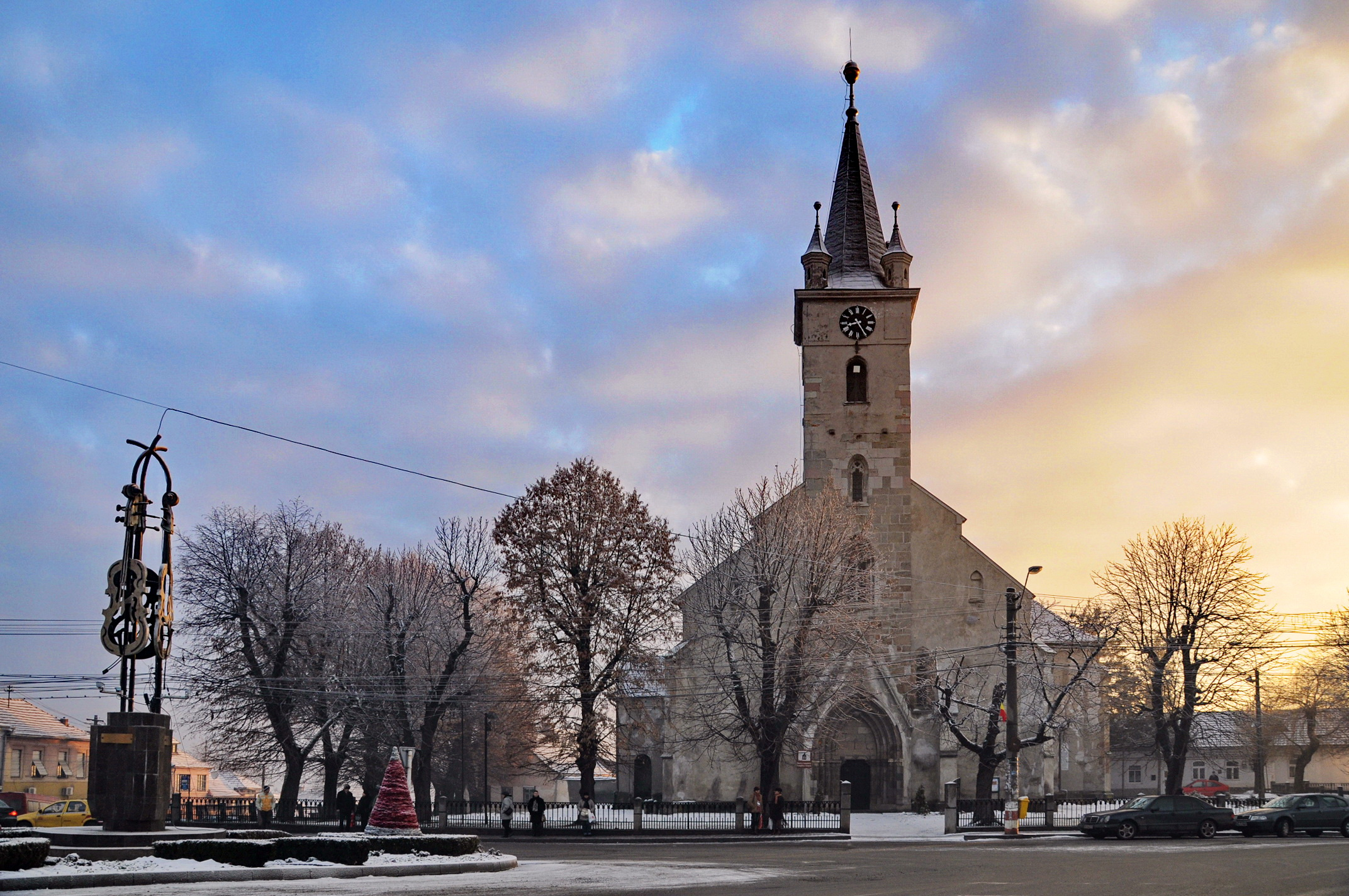
Reghin Evangelical Lutheran church of the local Transylvanian Saxon community

Reghin was first mentioned in 1228 in a charter of Hungarian King Andrew II as Regun – however, evidence of its strategic location and defence system suggests that the town might have been considerably older, possibly founded by Ladislaus I.

Despite the devastations of the city during the Mongol invasion (1241) and during the Tatar and Cuman incursions (1285), the town developed rapidly: already in the second half of the 13th century the city was the residence and power centre of the families Tomaj and Kacsik, to whom the nearby lands were awarded by the Hungarian Crown. Reghin became a minor ecclesiastical centre in 1330, with the building of the Gothic church (Roman Catholic at the time, it now serves the Protestant community) in the German part of the city; it is still the largest church in the area, and hosts the oldest Medieval Latin inscription of any church in Transylvania. The Hungarian part of the city has an even older church, initially built in the Romanesque style.

At the beginning of the 15th century the settlement gained city rights, and, from 1427, the right to hold fairs. In the 16th and 17th century Reghin was devastated by Habsburg and Ottoman troops on several occasions. It burned to the ground in 1848. In 1850 the town had 4,227 inhabitants, of which 2,964 were Germans, 644 Romanians, 556 Hungarians, 40 Jews, and 3 Roma. In 1910, the population of the city included 7,310 inhabitants, of which 2,994 were Germans, 2,947 Hungarians, and 1,311 Romanians.

After the collapse of Austria-Hungary at the end of World War I and the declaration of the Union of Transylvania with Romania, the Romanian Army took control of the area in December 1918, during the Hungarian–Romanian War. The city officially became part of the Kingdom of Romania in June 1920 under the terms of the Treaty of Trianon, under which Hungary relinquished all of Transylvania. In August 1940, the Second Vienna Award, arbitrated by Germany and Italy, reassigned the territory of Northern Transylvania (which included Reghin) from Romania to Hungary. Almost 30% of the inhabitants were Jews at that time. In May 1944, the Jews were gathered in the Reghin ghetto and on 4 June 1944 were deported to the Auschwitz concentration camp. Towards the end of World War II, Romanian and Soviet armies entered the city in October 1944. The territory of Northern Transylvania remained under Soviet military administration until March 9, 1945, after the appointment of Petru Groza as Prime Minister, when the city again became part of Romania.

After the war, Reghin lost some of its former Transylvanian Saxon character — as many Germans left for West Germany during the later stages of Communist Romania — and ethnic Romanians and Hungarians were settled in their place. The data of the 1992 census showed a population of 24,601 Romanians, 12,471 Hungarians, 1,790 Romani, and 346 Germans. In 1994, Reghin was declared a city.

== Jewish history of Reghin ==
Jews began to settle in Reghin at the close of the 18th century, an organized community was established only during the middle of the 19th century, probably in 1849. The majority of the Jews came from Bukovina and Galicia. As a result of the battles during the Revolution of 1848 against Austria and the riots in Transylvania, Reghin and its Jewish population suffered severely. The first Jewish settlers, who arrived mainly from Bukovina and Galicia, were Orthodox, and the community remained Orthodox throughout its existence. Hasidic influence was also felt. Besides the synagogue, there were two kloyzn (houses of prayer) where the Hasidim used to pray and had their own rabbis. A prominent figure in the community during its early years was the Orthodox rabbi Hillel Pollak, who was spiritually close to the extreme Orthodox rabbi Hillel Lichtenstein.

A Jewish elementary school was founded in 1874. (Later it ceased its activities but was reestablished in 1910 and functioned until 1940.) The language of instruction in the school was Hungarian until 1918, after which it was Romanian. In 1885 the community became the administrative center for all the Jews of the district. The community numbered 282 in 1866, about 40 families in 1889, and 394 persons (about 7% of the total population) in 1891. Jews engaged in commerce, industry, and crafts. Their trade and industry were mainly connected with timber and some of them owned sawmills; there were also unskilled Jewish workers employed in the timber industry. The institutions of the community assisted the poor. Some of the Ḥadarim established by the community translated the Pentateuch into German instead of Yiddish in order to facilitate study of this language by the children. From 1919 there was considerable Zionist activity in Reghin, and many members of the youth organizations emigrated to Israel. The community numbered 1,587 (about 16% of the total population) in 1930, and 1,653 (about 10% of the total) in 1941.

Between the two world wars, the Jews suffered from the nationalist and antisemitic activities of members of the Iron Guard, and from the official antisemitic policies of most of the Romanian governments. The change of rule in 1940 (from Romanian to Hungarian) did not bring with it any improvement, as was hoped by the Jews, who remembered their legal emancipation in 1867 by the Austro-Hungarian authorities.

=== Holocaust and aftermath ===
In the summer of 1944 the local Jews were concentrated into a ghetto set up in a brick factory. Jews from the surrounding area were also brought there. From this ghetto about 6,000 Jews were deported to Auschwitz by the Hungarian authorities, at the request of the Nazi occupiers.

After World War II, in 1947 a community numbering about 820 was formed mostly by survivors of the death camps and other Jews who had arrived in Reghin from places in different parts of Romania. The community gradually declined as a result of emigration to Israel and elsewhere. In 1971 there were still some 20 to 25 Jewish families living in Reghin and even fewer in the early 21st century.

== Architecture ==
Reghin possesses some of the architectural characteristics of Transylvania. The stylistic details and the wrought iron balconies in the centre of the town are examples of the artistry of the local craftsmen. They personalize almost each and every building from the center of the town, making the visitor feel the fragrance of times gone by.

The Evangelical church also known as the "Saxon church" has a tower that measures more than 47m high. The four smaller towers are proofs of the town's "Right to the sword". The construction of the church began at the end of the 13th century. Over the years, the architecture was modified because the church underwent many dramatic events. It was set on fire in 1400, 1630, and 1778. The documents reveal the use of several styles of early and transition Gothic style. The church was consolidated in 1501 and since 1551, when the Transylvanian Saxons adopted the Lutheran Reformation, on the main wall are written the words: "Redemption cometh not from war, it is for peace that we all pray.". Inside the church there is an organ with 20 registers that dates from 1784.

The Huszar Castle, formerly Bornemisza, situated in Apalina dates from the 13th–14th centuries and was restored in the 19th century. In the old mansion of the castle lived between 1584 and 1592 Gyulai Pál of Apalina (1559–1592). He was a royal diplomat, historian, chronicler, doctor, and classical poet. The castle was built in the Renaissance style with baroque elements. In 1953 the castle was taken over and used by different educational institutions for disabled persons. It has recently been returned to its owners according to the new laws of property.

== Culture ==
The "Petru Maior" municipal library has more than 130,000 books, one of which dating from the 16th century. Another important book is Petru Maior's "History of the Romanians' Origins in Dacia".

The Ethnographic Museum has a rich patrimony, grouped in 49 collections of ethnography, folk art, artistry, records. The edifice is a monument of architecture built in 1892. The items exhibited concern trades, national costumes, and tradition specific to the upper course of the Mureș River, the Gurghiu valley, and part of the Transylvanian Plain.

The "Eugen Nicoară" community centre was built between 1938 and 1939 when Dr. Eugen Nicoară was the president of the Reghin department of Astra Foundation. Representations of theatre, folk music, dances, chamber music, etc. are held on the stage of this building.

The building in which the "Alexandru Ceușianu" secondary school functions was constructed in 1870 and housed the local law court. Lately in the post-war period, there was the Hungarian pedagogical school. Close by was the house of the writer and magistrate Alexandru Ceușianu.

== Economy ==
The industry of Reghin is closely related to the traditions of the medieval trades and of the modern cooperative associations. Starting with the resources in the close vicinity, rich in wood and farm produces, the goods of the private producers from Reghin are in the market all over Romania and abroad. The wood processing industry is represented by companies such as Larix, Gralemn, Remex, Bucin-Mob, Prolemn, and Amis. Reghin is well known for the industry of the musical instruments, especially of violins. There are many companies that produce instruments using the famous resonance wood from the Călimani and Gurghiu forests. The violins made in Reghin are used abroad. The "Hora" Company is the first to manufacture instruments. In time, other companies were set up among which "Gliga Instrumente Muzicale". Yehudi Menuhin used a violin made by "Gliga" company.

== Sport ==
Reghin is represented by Avântul Reghin in association football. Avântul played in Liga I in the 1955 season. The team played in Liga III during the 2015–16 season.

== Demographics ==
Historical population
Year	Pop.	±%
1850	4,227	—
1880	5,652	+33.7%
1900	6,057	+7.2%
1910	7,310	+20.7%
1930	9,290	+27.1%
1948	9,599	+3.3%
1956	18,091	+88.5%
1966	23,295	+28.8%
1977	29,903	+28.4%
1992	39,240	+31.2%
2002	36,023	−8.2%
2011	33,281	−7.6%
2022	29,742	−10.6%
Source: Census data

=== Historic ===
In 1850, under the domination of the Austrian Empire, the town featured a German majority, with:

- Germans (Transylvanian Saxons): 2,964 (70.12%)
- Romanians: 644 (15.70%)
- Hungarians: 556 (13.15%)
- Others: 63 (1.49%)

60 years later, while the town was under Hungarian domination in Austria-Hungary, the town still featured a dual German-Hungarian majority, with a sizeable Romanian minority:

- Germans (Transylvanian Saxons): 2,994 (40.95%)
- Hungarians: 2,947 (40.31%)
- Romanians: 1,311 (17.93%)
- Others: 58 (0.79%)

=== Modern times ===
The 2021 census in Romania revealed the following statistics:

- Romanians: 17,304 (58,18%)
- Hungarians: 5,607 (18,85%)
- Romani: 1,754 (5.89%)
- Germans (Transylvanian Saxons): 90 (0.30%)
- Others (Ukrainians, non-Europeans): 4,987 (16.76%)

== Landmarks ==
Traditional German architectural heritage:

- The Protestant (Lutheran) church, built in 1330 in honour of Saint Mary. Burnt down in 1708 and in 1848, after which it had been rebuilt.
- The Roman Catholic Church, which was consecrated in 1781.

Traditional Hungarian architectural heritage:

- The Protestant (Calvinist) church, 13th century, in 1910 completely rebuilt.
- A Calvinist church built in 1890.

Traditional Romanian architectural heritage:

- The Wooden Church, built in 1744, both Greek-Catholic and Romanian Orthodox during its history.
- The Greek-Catholic church, built between 1811 and 1813, nowadays Romanian Orthodox.

New landmarks:

- The Romanian Orthodox Cathedral was built in the city in the 1990s.
- The renowned zoological and folklore collections.

== Natives ==
- Réka Albert (born 1972), physicist, biologist
- Magda Kun (1912–1945), actress
- Augustin Maior (1882–1963), physicist, educator, and inventor
- Georg Maurer (1907–1971), writer
- Hugó Meltzl (1846–1908), rector of Franz Joseph University
- Rudolf Wagner-Régeny (1903–1969), composer

== Twin towns – sister cities ==
Reghin is twinned with:

- Bourg-la-Reine, France
- Érd, Hungary
- Lubaczów, Poland
- Nagykőrös, Hungary
- Salle, Italy
- Ungheni, Moldova

== Images ==
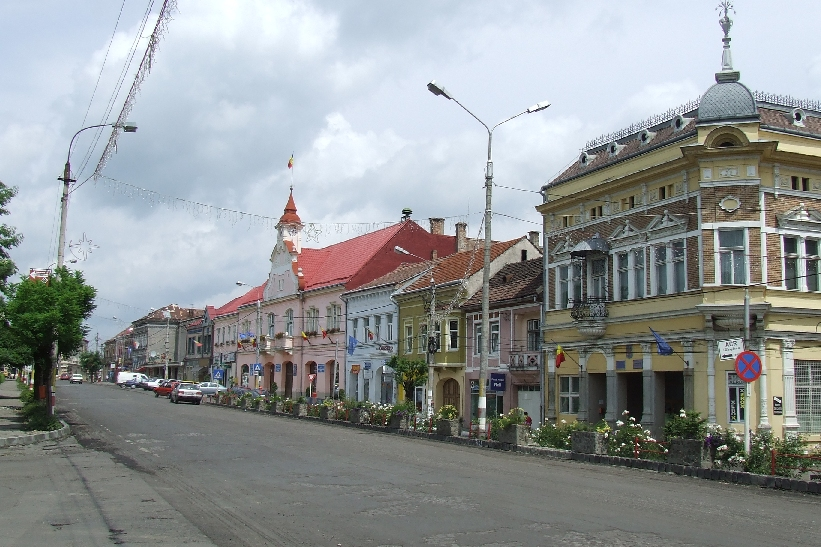
The centre of Reghin

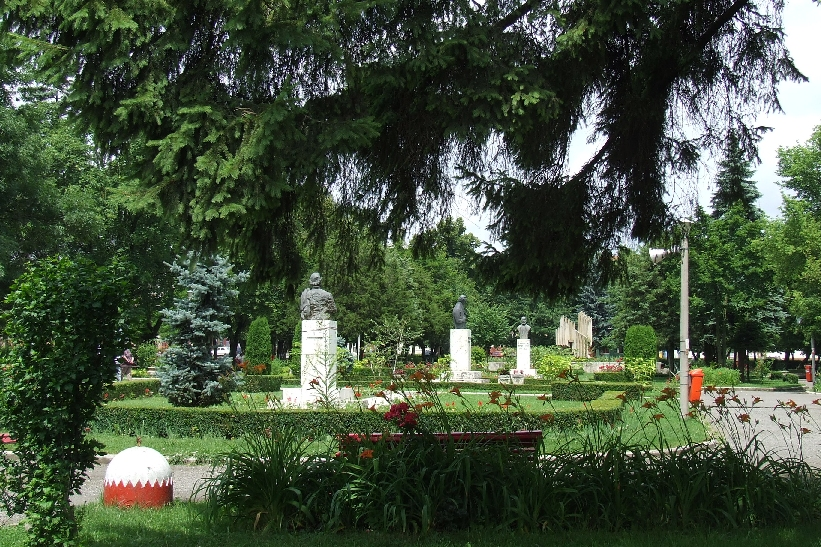
The city park

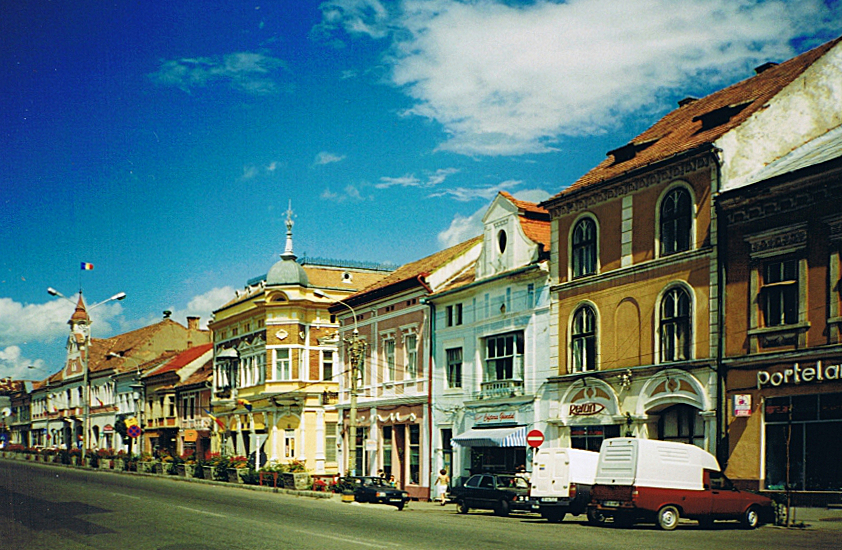
The city centre

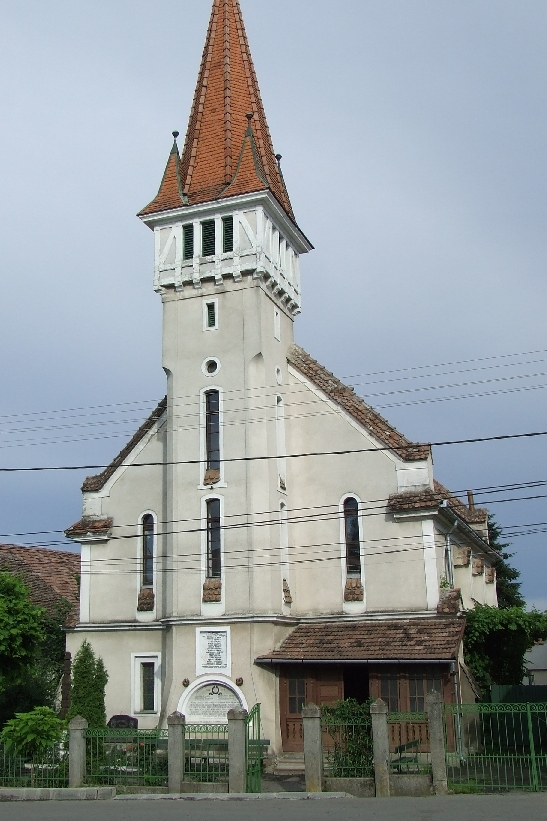
Reformed church

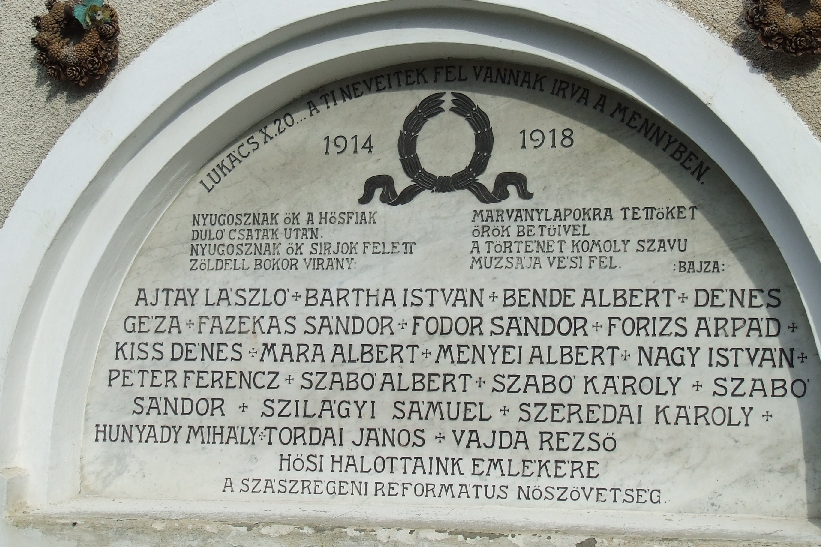
Plaque honouring World War I Hungarian heroes at the Reformed Church

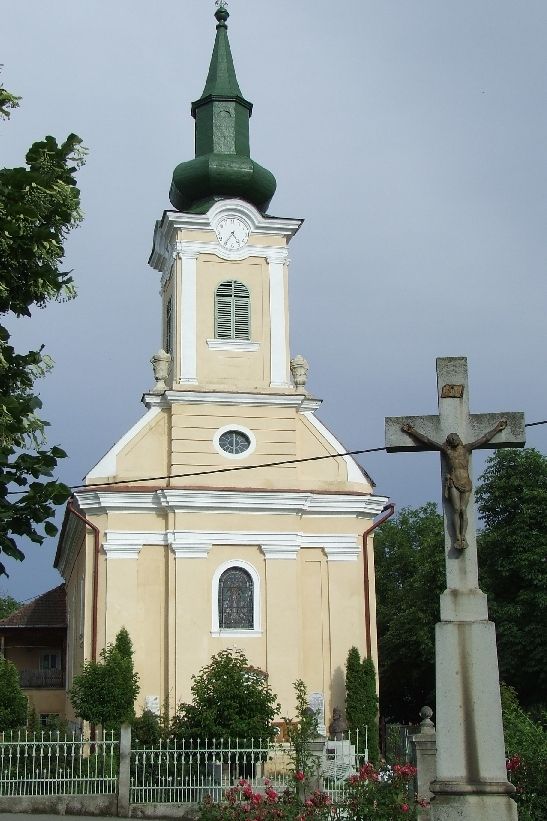

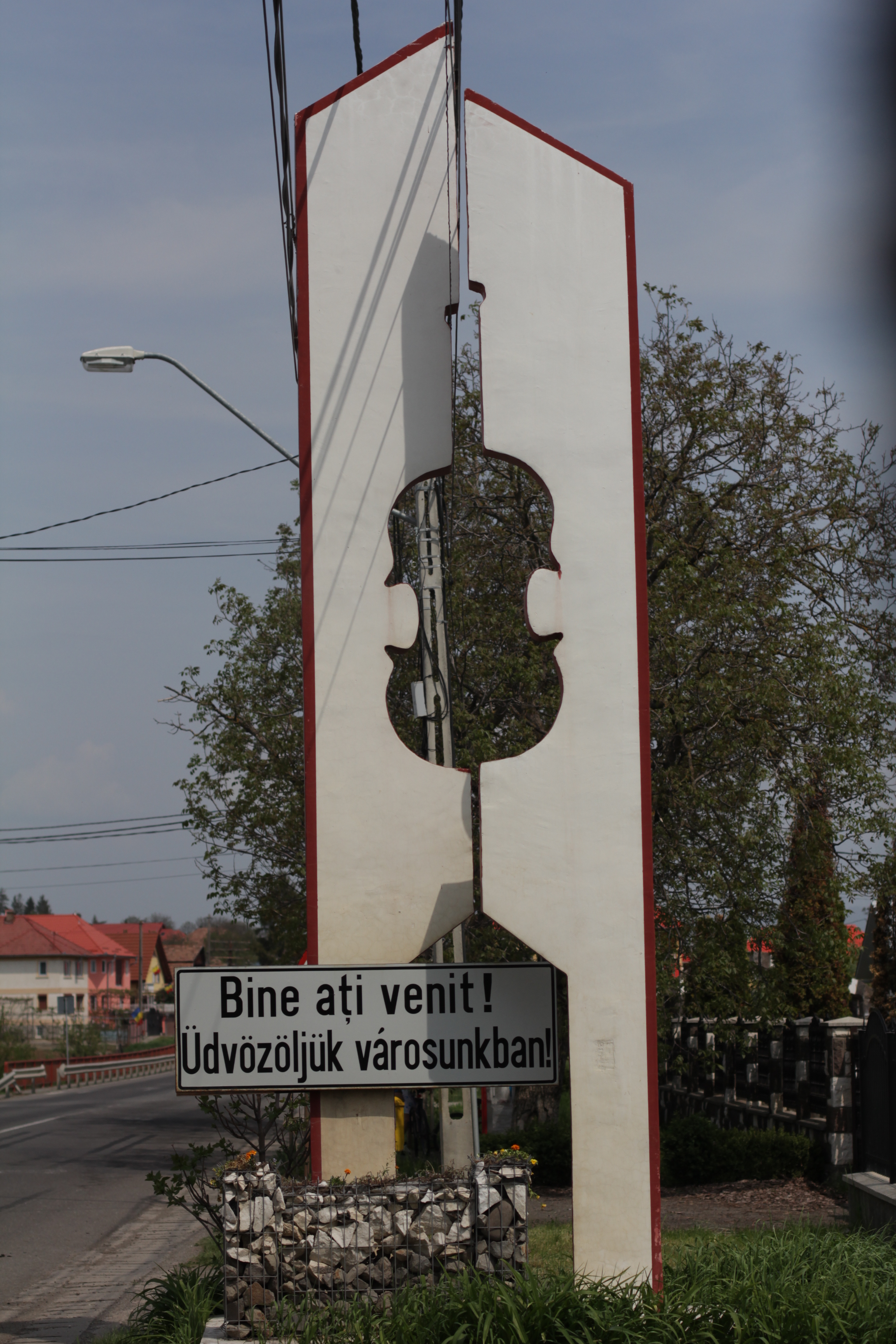
The monument at the entrance to Reghin, welcoming people

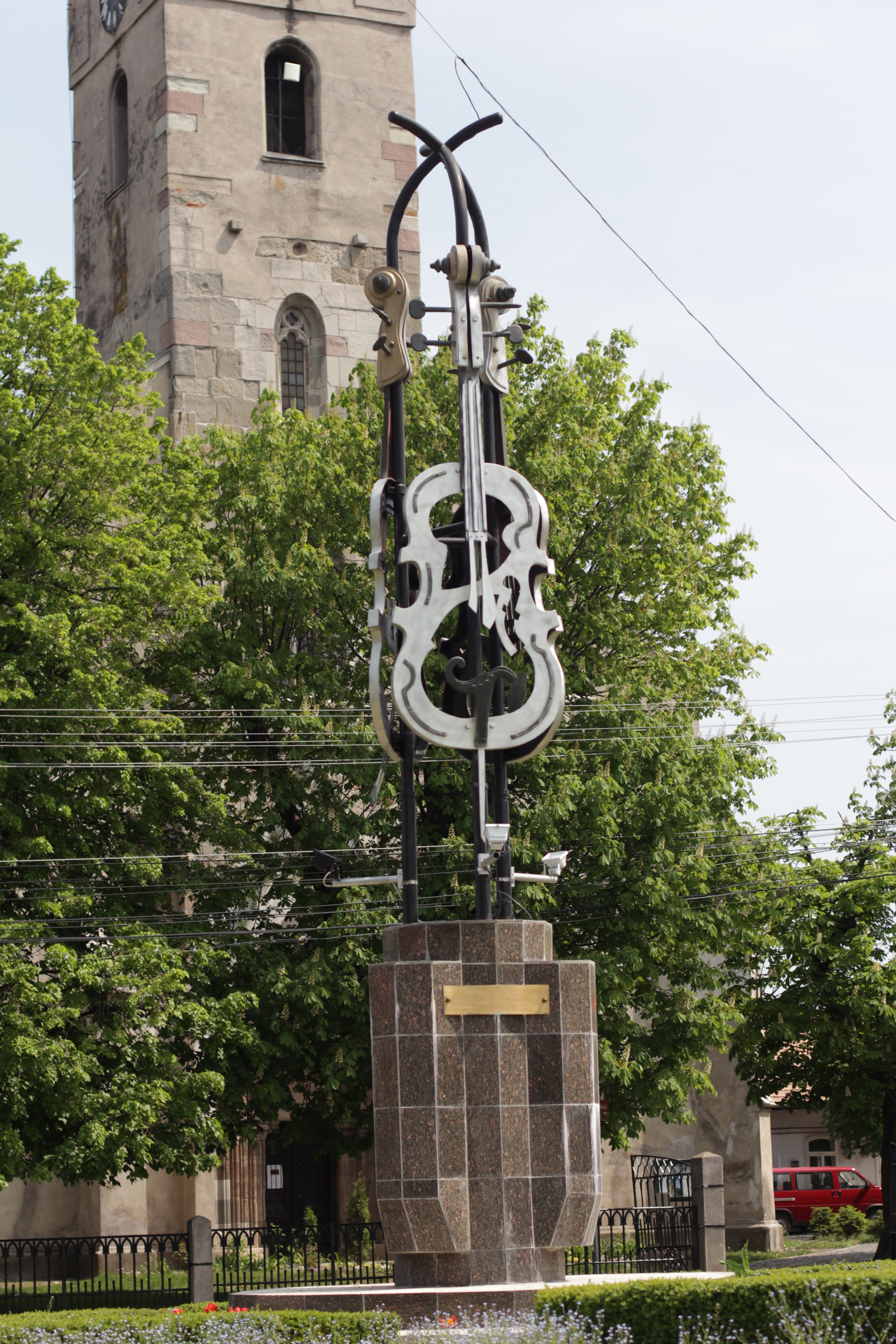
The Violins monument in the centre of the city, a symbol of Reghin

== See also ==
- List of Hungarian exonyms (Mureș County)
