= Tih =

- Location within Romania

Location
- Country: Romania
- Counties: Mureș County

Physical characteristics
- Source: Călimani Mountains
- Mouth: Răstolița
  - coordinates: 47.0271°N 25.0280°E
- Length: 15 km (9.3 mi)
- Basin size: 77 km^{2} (30 sq mi)

Basin features
- Progression: Răstolița→ Mureș→ Tisza→ Danube→ Black Sea
- Tributaries
  - left: Ciungel
  - right: Pârâul Mijlociu

The Tih is a left tributary of the river Răstolița in Romania. Its source is in the Călimani Mountains. Its length is 15 km (9.3 mi) and its basin size is 77 km^{2} (30 sq mi).
