= Stânceni =

- Commune
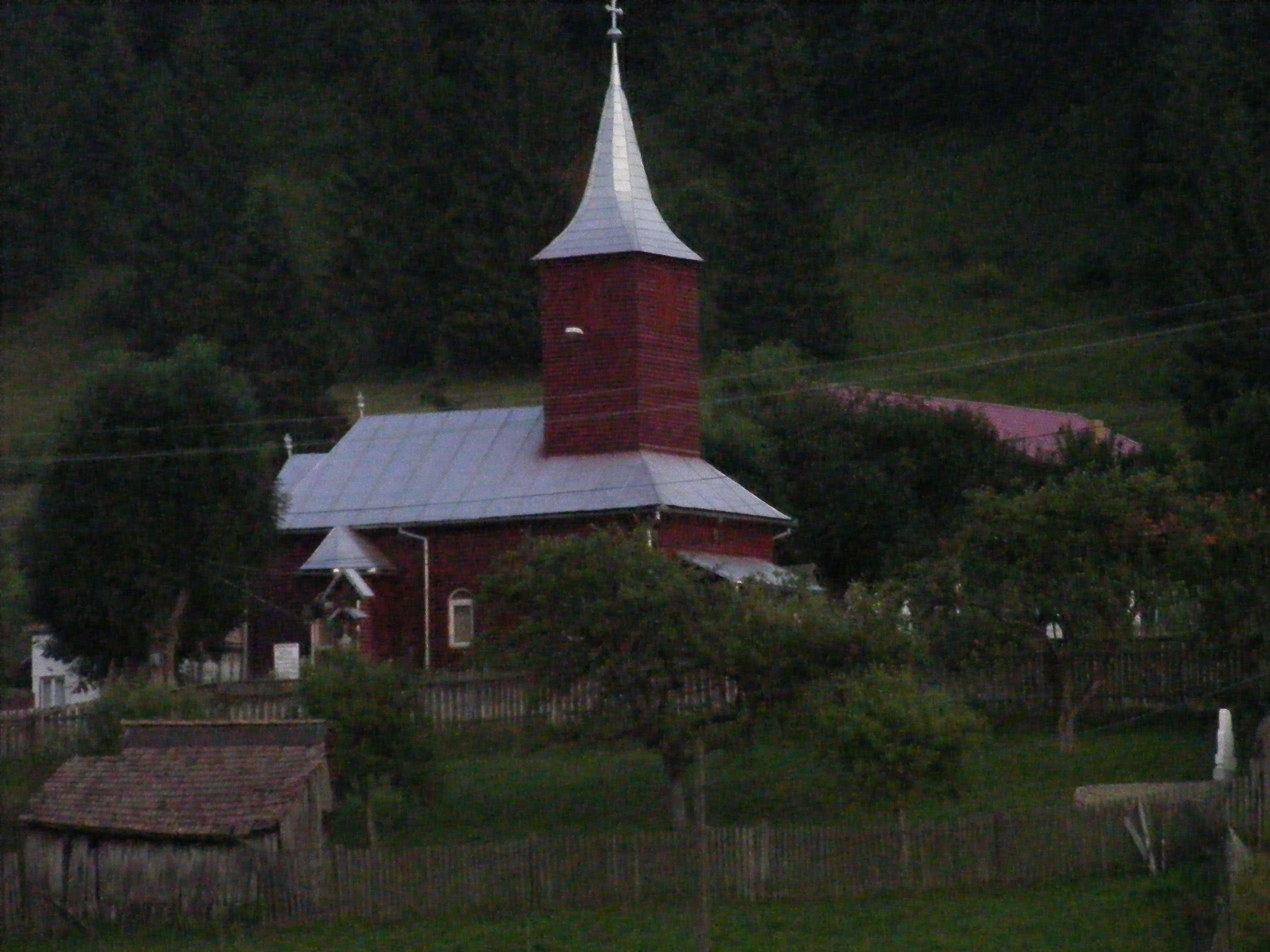
- Orthodox church in Ciobotani

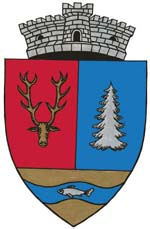
- Coat of arms

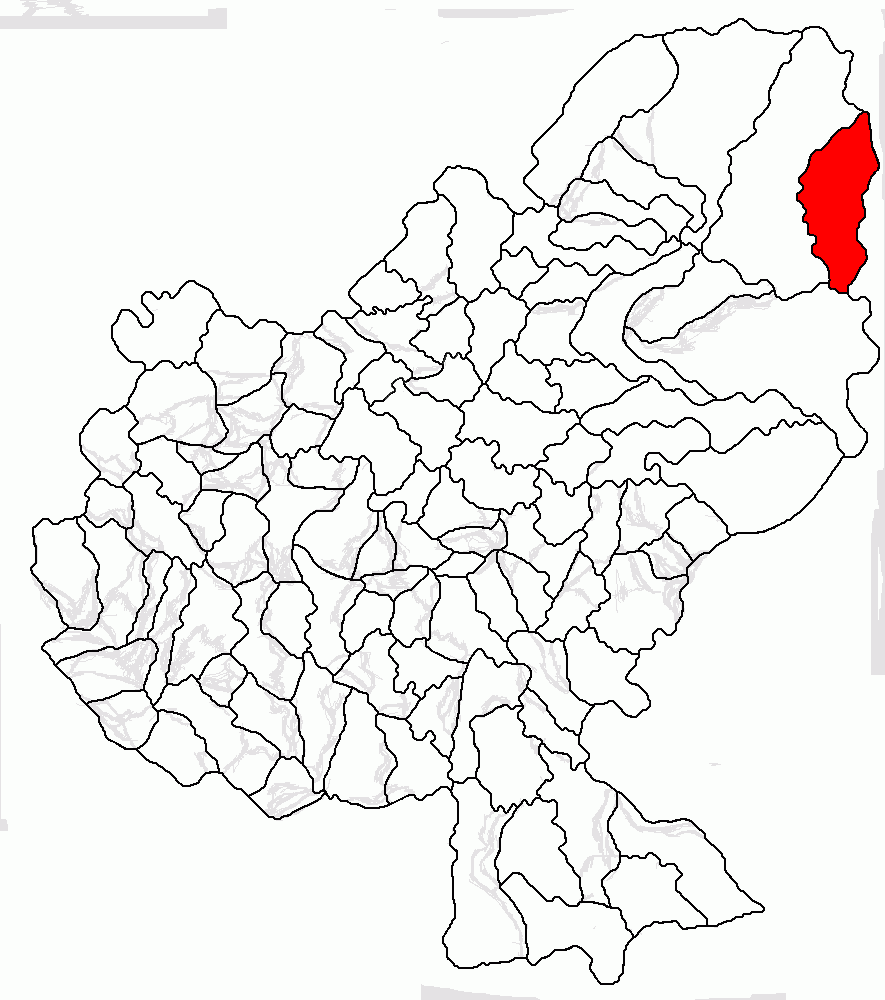
- Location in Mureș County

- Location in Romania
- Coordinates: 46°57′N 25°14′E
- Country: Romania
- County: Mureș

Government
  - Mayor (2024–2028): Ștefan Bicăjan (PNL)
- Area: 124.56 km^{2} (48.09 sq mi)
- Elevation: 626 m (2,054 ft)
- Population (2021-12-01): 1,325
  - Density: 10.64/km^{2} (27.55/sq mi)
- Time zone: UTC+02:00 (EET)
  - Summer (DST): UTC+03:00 (EEST)
- Postal code: 547575
- Area code: (+40) 0265
- Vehicle reg.: MS
- Website: www.comunastanceni.ro

Stânceni (Hungarian: Gödemesterháza, Hungarian pronunciation: [ˈɡødɛmɛʃtɛrhaːzɒ]) is a commune in Mureș County, Transylvania, Romania that is composed of three villages: Ciobotani (Csobotány), Meștera (Mesterháza), and Stânceni.

The Defileul Mureșului Superior Natural Park is located in part on the territory of the commune.

At the 2002 census, the commune had a population of 1,547: 82% Romanians, 17% Hungarians, and 1% others. At the 2021 census, Stânceni had a population of 1,325; of those, 82.57% were Romanians, 12.45% Hungarians, and 4.38% others.

== See also ==
- List of Hungarian exonyms (Mureș County)
