= Ardeu =

- Location within Romania

Location
- Country: Romania
- Counties: Alba, Hunedoara
- Villages: Almașu Mare, Glod, Ardeu

Physical characteristics
- Mouth: Băcâia
  - location: Bozeș
  - coordinates: 45.9760°N 23.1714°E
- Length: 25 km (16 mi)
- Basin size: 48 km^{2} (19 sq mi)

Basin features
- Progression: Băcâia→ Geoagiu→ Mureș→ Tisza→ Danube→ Black Sea

The Ardeu is a right tributary of the river Băcâia in Romania. It flows into the Băcâia in Bozeș. Its length is 25 km (16 mi) and its basin size is 48 km^{2} (19 sq mi).
