= Cib (river) =

- Location within Romania

Location
- Country: Romania
- Counties: Alba, Hunedoara
- Villages: Cib, Cheile Cibului, Băcâia

Physical characteristics
- Mouth: Băcâia
  - location: Băcâia
  - coordinates: 46.0160°N 23.1730°E
- Length: 11 km (6.8 mi)
- Basin size: 31 km^{2} (12 sq mi)

Basin features
- Progression: Băcâia→ Geoagiu→ Mureș→ Tisza→ Danube→ Black Sea
- Tributaries
  - left: Drașcu

The Cib is a right tributary of the river Băcâia in Romania. It flows into the Băcâia in the village Băcâia. Its length is 11 km (6.8 mi) and its basin size is 31 km^{2} (12 sq mi).
