= Geoagiu (disambiguation) =

Geoagiu can refer to the following places in Romania:

- Geoagiu, a town in Hunedoara County
- Geoagiu de Sus, a village in the commune Stremț, Alba County
- Geoagiu (Hunedoara), a right tributary of the river Mureș in Hunedoara County
- Geoagiu (Alba), a right tributary of the river Mureș in Alba County
