= Vaidei =

Vaidei may refer to several places in Romania:

- Vaidei, a village in Stănești Commune, Gorj County
- Vaidei, a village in Romos Commune, Hunedoara County
- Vaidei (river), a tributary of the Mureș in Hunedoara County
