= Germisara =

Germisara may refer to:

- Germisara (ancient city), an ancient Dacian and Roman settlement located in Hunedoara County, Romania
- Germisara (castra), a Roman fort in Geoagiu, Hunedoara County, Romania
- a walnut cultiva
