= Vajdej =

Vajdej is the Hungarian name for two villages in Romania:

- Vaidei village, Romos Commune, Hunedoara County
- Râu Mic village, Sălașu de Sus Commune, Hunedoara County
