= Stăuini =

Stăuini may refer to several villages in Romania:

- Stăuini, a village in Vințu de Jos Commune, Alba County
- Stăuini, a village in Balșa Commune, Hunedoara County
