= Băcâia =

- Location within Romania

Location
- Country: Romania
- Counties: Hunedoara County
- Villages: Băcâia, Bozeș

Physical characteristics
- Mouth: Geoagiu
  - location: Bozeș
  - coordinates: 45.9643°N 23.1687°E
- Length: 11 km (6.8 mi)
- Basin size: 100 km^{2} (39 sq mi)

Basin features
- Progression: Geoagiu→ Mureș→ Tisza→ Danube→ Black Sea
- Tributaries
  - right: Cib, Ardeu

The Băcâia (Hungarian: Bakonya) is a left tributary of the river Geoagiu in Romania which flows into the Geoagiu in Bozeș. Its length is 11 km (6.8 mi) and its basin size is 100 km^{2} (39 sq mi).
