= Vaidei (river) =

Vaidei Vajdej-patak
- Location within Romania

Location
- Country: Romania
- Counties: Hunedoara County
- Villages: Vaidei

Physical characteristics
- Mouth: Mureș
  - location: Geoagiu
  - coordinates: 45.8952°N 23.2244°E
- Length: 14 km (8.7 mi)
- Basin size: 26 km^{2} (10 sq mi)

Basin features
- Progression: Mureș→ Tisza→ Danube→ Black Sea

The Vaidei (Hungarian: Vajdej-patak) is a left tributary of the river Mureș in Romania. It discharges into the Mureș near Geoagiu. Its length is 14 km (8.7 mi) and its basin size is 26 km^{2} (10 sq mi).
