= Shibu =

Shibu may refer to:

- Shibu (name)
- Shibu (film), a 2019 Indian Malayalam-language film
- Shibu (dance), a form of kenshibu, a category of Japanese interpretive dances

== See also ==
- Shiba (disambiguation)
