= Nădăștia =

Nădăștia may refer to:

- Nădăștia, a village in Almașu Mare Commune, Alba County, Romania
- Nădăștia de Jos and Nădăștia de Sus, villages in Călan Town, Hunedoara County, Romania
- Nădăștia River, a tributary of the Strei River in Romania
