= CHIB =

Former radio station in Chibougamau, Quebec

- Chibougamau, Quebec; Canada
- Broadcast area: Nord-du-Québec
- Frequency: 1340 kHz
- Branding: CHIB

Programming
- Language: English • French
- Affiliations: Independent

Ownership
- Owner: Royal Canadian Air Force
- Sister stations: CHIF

History
- First air date: 11 February 1963
- Last air date: 31 October 1984
- Call sign meaning: Chibougamau, name of the town

Technical information
- Licensing authority: CRTC
- Power: 40 W

CHIB was a volunteer-run radio station in Chibougamau, Quebec, Canada, located at CFS Chibougamau, a military radar installation that formed a limited part of the Pine Tree Line connection. The station was managed and operated by volunteers, and received equipment and technical support from both their own local institutions and by the Corporation for Public Broadcasting, being the only radio station they funded within Canadian terms.

It operated on 1340 kHz AM and served the local region with an estimated audience of 8,000 listeners. The station first went on the air on February 11, 1963, and signed off for the last time on October 31, 1984. Programming included coverage of local news, sports, visual arts, dramedy, public affairs, special events, political talk, educational, recreational and public affairs programs, news and sportscasts, and simulcasts of university shows.

== History ==
=== Establishment ===
CHIB was established as a volunteer-run, nonprofit, noncommercial community radio station at RCAF Station Chibougamau (later redesignated CFS Chibougamau), a Royal Canadian Air Force radar installation located near the town of Chibougamau, Quebec. The station was created to provide broadcasting services to the local region, including military personnel stationed at the base and civilians in the surrounding community. Construction and setup took place in late February 1962, with promotional material indicating the station's presence as early as November of that year. CHIB officially went on the air on December 25, 1963, operating from studios at the military base. The station's establishment coincided with the operational phase of RCAF Station Chibougamau, which had opened in April 1963 as part of Canada's Pre-WWI community eras under their radar defense network. It served an estimated audience of 8,000 listeners within the isolated northern region at the time of its launch.

=== Operations ===
During its operational years, CHIB served as a nonprofit, noncommercial community radio station broadcasting from facilities at CFS Chibougamau. It catered to an estimated 8,000 listeners in the Chibougamau region, providing local programming that addressed the needs of the isolated northern community.

The station functioned as a key bridge between the military personnel at the radar installation and the civilian population of Chibougamau, facilitating communication, local information sharing, and community cohesion in a remote area tied to Cold War defense infrastructure. This role helped integrate the military base with the surrounding town through shared broadcasting content. CHIB was volunteer-run and relied on contributions from both military station personnel and local civilians to maintain operations and deliver content.

=== Closure ===
CHIB ceased broadcasting on October 31, 1984, marking the end of its more than 21 years of operation as a volunteer-run community radio station. The closure occurred amid broader transitions in the Pine Tree Line network, as many radar installations became redundant due to technological advancements, upgrades to the DEW Line, and the introduction of the North Warning System farther north. Although CHIB ended its transmissions in 1984, the hosting CFS Chibougamau facility continued military operations until its official closure on April 1, 1988, under the North American Air Defence Modernization Plan announced by the Department of National Defence in 1985.

== Facilities ==
=== CFS Chibougamau ===
CFS Chibougamau, originally known as RCAF Station Chibougamau, was a Royal Canadian Air Force radar installation established near the town of Chibougamau, Quebec, as part of the Cold War-era Pinetree Line network. The station officially opened on 1 May 1962, with initial personnel arriving earlier in 1962, to address coverage gaps in northern Quebec between existing radar sites. The base underwent a name change to Canadian Forces Station (CFS) Chibougamau in 1968, following the unification of the Canadian Armed Forces. It housed No. 10 Aircraft Control and Warning Squadron (later redesignated 10 Radar Squadron in 1963), with a typical population of about 200 service personnel and civilian support staff. The facility included a headquarters and domestic area within the town of Chibougamau, while the operations site—equipped with radar antennas and protective radomes—was located several miles north on a mountain top. CFS Chibougamau served as the physical host for the volunteer-operated community radio station CHIB, with the station's studios located on the base and broadcasting beginning in February 1963. This arrangement supported community programming for both military personnel stationed there and the civilian population of Chibougamau.

=== Pine Tree Line connection ===
CFS Chibougamau formed part of the Pinetree Line, a network of radar stations constructed during the early Cold War to provide early warning against potential Soviet bomber attacks targeting North America. The Pinetree Line was a joint Canada-United States project, with stations positioned across southern Canada near the 50th parallel and manned by the Royal Canadian Air Force (RCAF), United States Air Force (USAF), or both depending on the site, to detect incoming aerial threats and direct interceptors. Activated in 1961, CFS Chibougamau was operated by No. 10 Radar Squadron (formerly Aircraft Control and Warning Squadron) and contributed to this air defense system by providing radar surveillance and data for NORAD coordination.

The military installation's presence in the remote mining town of Chibougamau directly supported the establishment and operation of CHIB as a community radio station. Broadcasting began in February 1963 from studios located at the RCAF Station Chibougamau (renamed CFS Chibougamau in 1967), with the facility providing the necessary infrastructure for transmission. Volunteers from both the radar station's military personnel and the local civilian population collaborated to run the nonprofit, noncommercial station, enabling it to serve an estimated audience of 8,000 listeners that included both service members stationed at the base and town residents. This integration of military and civilian efforts reflected the station's role in fostering community cohesion in an isolated area shaped by Cold War defense priorities. The Pinetree Line context brought a stable military population to Chibougamau, whose involvement helped sustain CHIB's bilingual programming and local relevance until the station's closure in 1984, several years before the base itself ceased operations in 1988.

== Technical Specifications ==
=== Frequency & Power ===
CHIB operated on the AM broadcast band at a frequency of 1340 kHz (previously referred to as 1340 kilocycles). The station transmitted from its facility at CFS Chibougamau, which limited its coverage primarily to the local area around Chibougamau, Quebec, reaching an estimated audience of 8,000 listeners.

=== Callsign ===
The call sign CHIB was derived from the name of the town it served, Chibougamau. A memoir by Ed Chenier, who was stationed at CFS Chibougamau during the station's early period, states that permission was obtained from the CRTC to establish the station, and "our station letters were 'CHIB' Chibougamau." This derivation reflects the common practice of Canadian broadcasters adopting call signs that evoke their local community or geographic location.

== Programming ==
=== Bilingual Broadcasts ===
CHIB broadcast in both French and English to address the linguistic diversity of its listening area, serving the predominantly French-speaking residents of Chibougamau and the English-speaking military personnel at CFS Chibougamau. This bilingual approach was integral to its role as a community-oriented station, enabling effective communication and engagement across language barriers in a remote northern Quebec setting where both languages coexisted due to the military installation and local population. The station's dual-language programming contributed to its accessibility for an estimated audience of 8,000 listeners, fostering a shared community space despite the challenges of isolation and limited external signals.

=== Volunteer Operations ===
CHIB was a volunteer-run, nonprofit, and noncommercial community radio station, relying entirely on unpaid community members to manage and operate its broadcasts. Volunteers were drawn from both military personnel stationed at CFS Chibougamau and civilians in the town of Chibougamau, enabling the station to draw on a diverse pool of talent for its programming needs. This collaborative model between the military base and local residents supported CHIB's role as a community-oriented service. Representative examples of volunteer involvement include individuals serving as disc jockeys; for instance, Doris Blondeau worked in that capacity at CHIB. The volunteer-driven structure allowed CHIB to maintain its noncommercial status and focus on serving the town's bilingual audience without reliance on advertising revenue or paid staff.

=== Frequent Genres ===
Like many military community stations of the Pinetree Line era, CHIB's daily schedule was tailored around the shifts and lifestyles of the base. The local programming typically included updates on activities at CFS Chibougamau, local town events, weather conditions, and recreational schedules, as well as shows featuring popular music formats of the respective decades (from 1960s pop and rock-and-roll to 1970s and 1980s easy listening and adult contemporary hits), and local updates interspersed with broader news to keep remote personnel connected with the rest of Canada. However, the station also produced some children's programs for its local community.
