= Romos (river) =

Romos Romosz-patak
- Location within Romania

Location
- Country: Romania
- Counties: Hunedoara County
- Villages: Romoșel, Romos

Physical characteristics
- Mouth: Mureș
  - location: Geoagiu
  - coordinates: 45.8935°N 23.2242°E
- Length: 26 km (16 mi)
- Basin size: 66 km^{2} (25 sq mi)

Basin features
- Progression: Mureș→ Tisza→ Danube→ Black Sea

The Romos or Romoșel (Hungarian: Romosz, Romosz-patak) is a left tributary of the river Mureș in Romania. It discharges into the Mureș in Gelmar near Geoagiu. Its length is 26 km (16 mi) and its basin size is 66 km^{2} (25 sq mi).

The river's course is located in the eastern part of Hunedoara County, an area characterized by the southwestern edge of the Transylvanian Plateau and the northern foothills of the Șureanu Mountains. The river flows through a landscape of hills and valleys, typical for this region of Transylvania.
