= CFS Chibougamau =

Military radar installation in Quebec, Canada

Canadian Forces Station Chibougamau

Site information
- Type: Radar Station
- Code: C-42
- Controlled by: Royal Canadian Air Force

Location
- Coordinates: 49.94804°N 74.34310°W

Site history
- Built: 1960-1962
- Built by: Royal Canadian Air Force
- In use: 1962-1988

Location of Canadian Forces Station Chibougamau, Quebec

CFS Chibougamau, or RCAF Station Chibougamau (pre-1967), housed the 10 Radar Squadron (Royal Canadian Air Force). The facility was a military radar installation in Chibougamau, Quebec, Canada, that formed part of the Pinetree Line. Shortly after opening, in 1963, it was converted to semi-automated operation using the NORAD SAGE system. The station was operated exclusively by the Royal Canadian Air Force.

Construction took place from the summer of 1960 until the end of September 1962. It officially opened on May 1, 1962, and closed some time in 1988.

Radio station CHIB, 1340 kHz, was a community radio station operated by volunteers from the radar station and the civilian community.
