= Germisara (castra) =

- Castra of Cigmău; Germizirga, Germigera, Germizera, Zermizirga
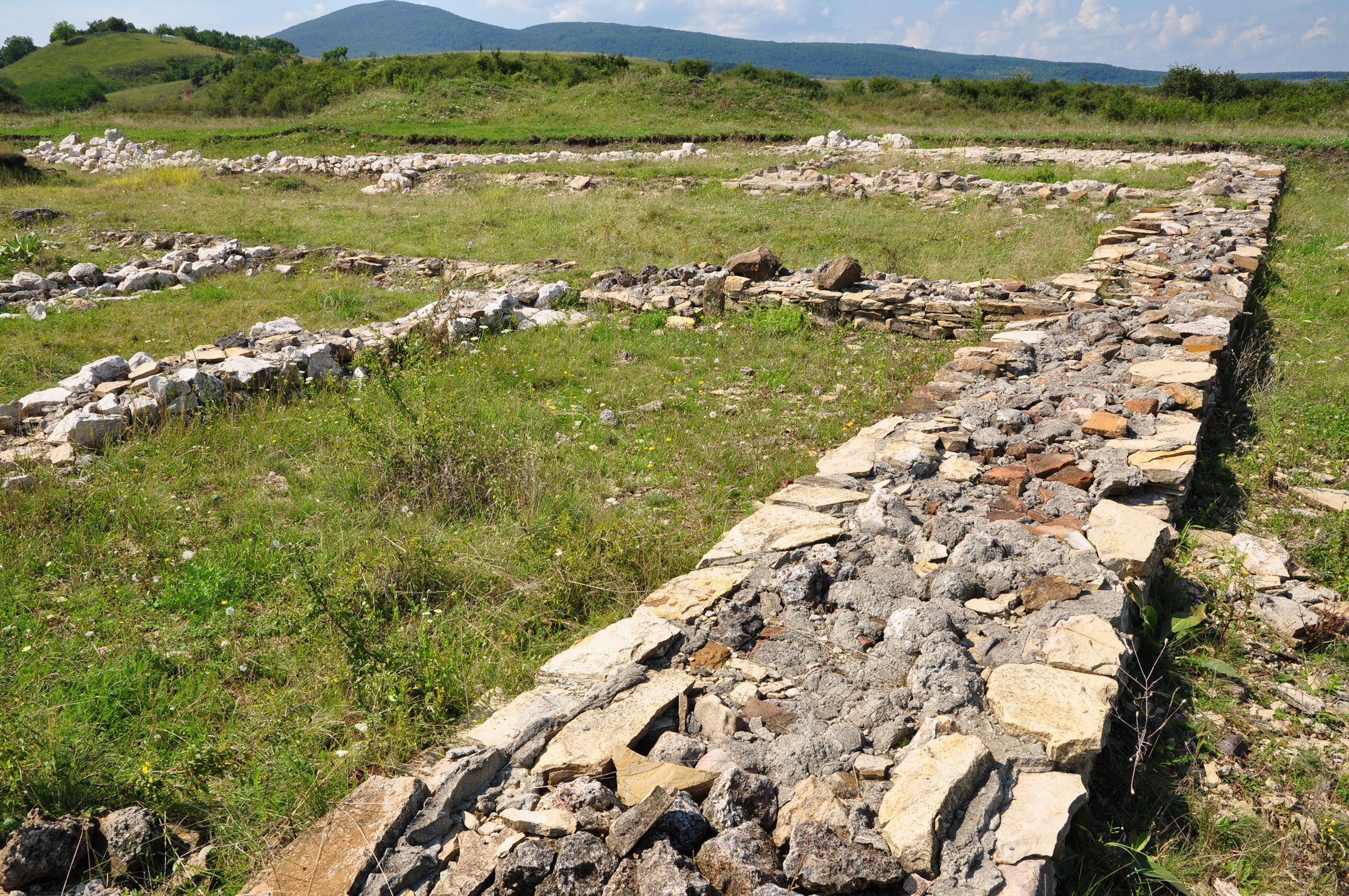

- Location within Romania
- 45.893780°N 23.190211°E
- Location: Dealul Urieșilor, platoul Turiac, Progadie, Cigmău, Romania

History
- Founded: 2nd century AD

Site notes
- Elevation: 212 m (696 ft)
- Condition: Ruined

Germisara was a fort in the Roman province of Dacia, now a ruin near the village of Cigmău in Romania.

== Location ==
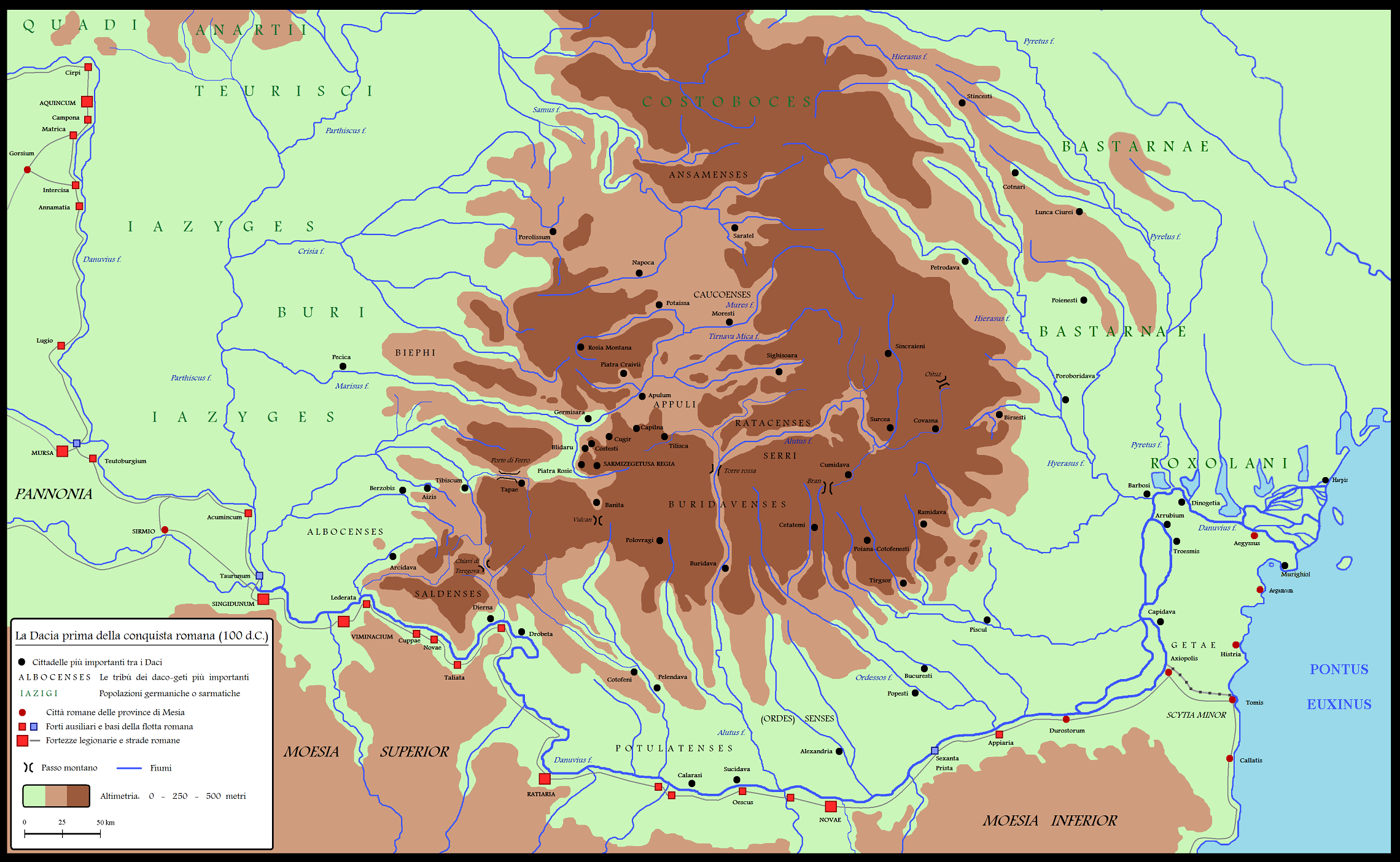
Location of Germisara in Dacia

The fort is located almost two kilometres east of the village Cigmău and two kilometres south-west of the small town of Geoagiu in the undeveloped, agriculturally used or wasteland "Cetatea uriasilor" (fortress of the giants) or "Progadie". Topographically, it lies on a high terrace on the northern bank of the Mureș, about two and a half kilometres below the confluence of the Geoagiu River. In ancient times, the fort probably had the tactical task of monitoring the valley of Mureș and the strategic function of controlling an area in which numerous Dacian fortresses had been located before the Roman occupation. Administratively it was first located in the province of Dacia superior, later in the Dacia Apulensis.

The Roman health resort Germisara, today Geoagiu-Băi, developed five kilometres north of the fort and made use of the thermal springs of the mountains.

== Etymology and sources ==
The name Germisara is of Dacian origin, means "hot water" (germi = heat, sara = waterfall) and refers to the local thermal springs. It is listed on the Tabula Peutingeriana and both in the Geographike Hyphegesis of Claudius Ptolemy and in the Cosmographia of the Geographer of Ravenna. Overall, the name Germisara seems to refer to an extensive area, possibly a pagus, which included the military camp, the associated auxiliary vicus, the cemeteries, and the thermal springs.

== Fort ==
The excavations discovered of a stone fort with a trapezoidal ground plan and unusual axis lengths of 320 m by 120 m, corresponding to an area of 3.84 hectares. The irregular form is probably due to the fact that the topographical conditions of the high terrace had to be taken into account when the fort was built.

=== Principia ===
Notwithstanding the unusual shape of the camp floor plan, the principia (staff buildings) have a regular, rectangular (approaching a square) and symmetrical floor plan with a north-south axis of 34 m and an east-west axis of 35 m length. This results in a building area of 1,190 sqm. The building complex has an inner courtyard of 13 m by 18 m (= 234 sqm), bordered on three sides by porticos and bounded by functional rooms. The entrance in the form of a six metre wide vestibule is located on the south side. To the north, the inner courtyard is bounded by a basilica, which extends across the entire width of the Principia, but only has a depth of five metres. In the eastern part of the basilica, traces of walls were found that can be interpreted with reservations as the remains of a tribunal. The hall is closed by a 3.50 m deep escape from a total of six rooms. These rooms have different widths, so that despite the even number of rooms the flag sanctuary (aedes or sacellum) is located in the symmetry axis of the building complex (east of the aedes are two rooms, west three rooms). The cellar of the flag sanctuary, in which the troop treasury was traditionally kept, is still well preserved.

Plan of the Principia

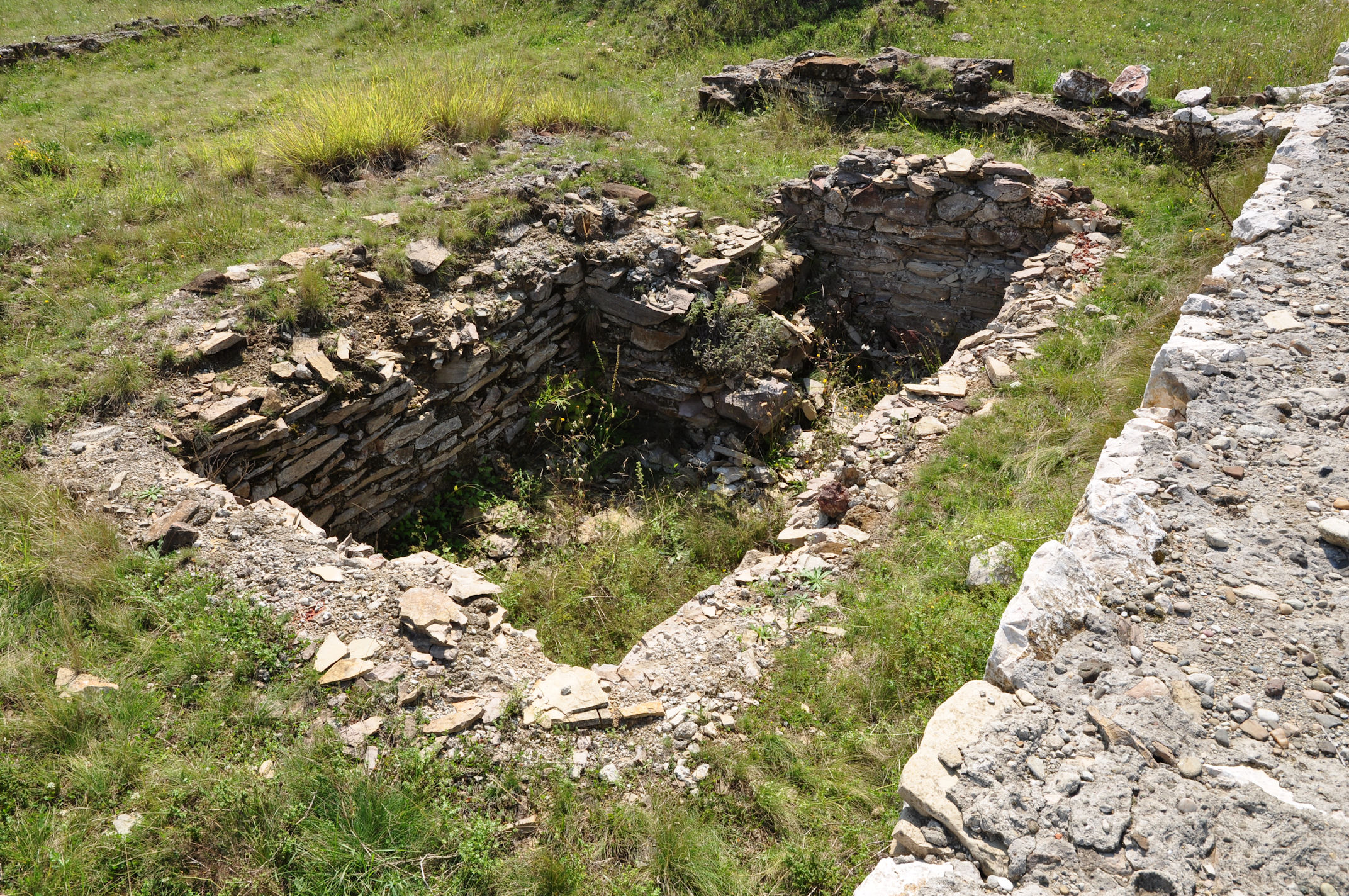
Cellar for the treasury

=== Horrea ===
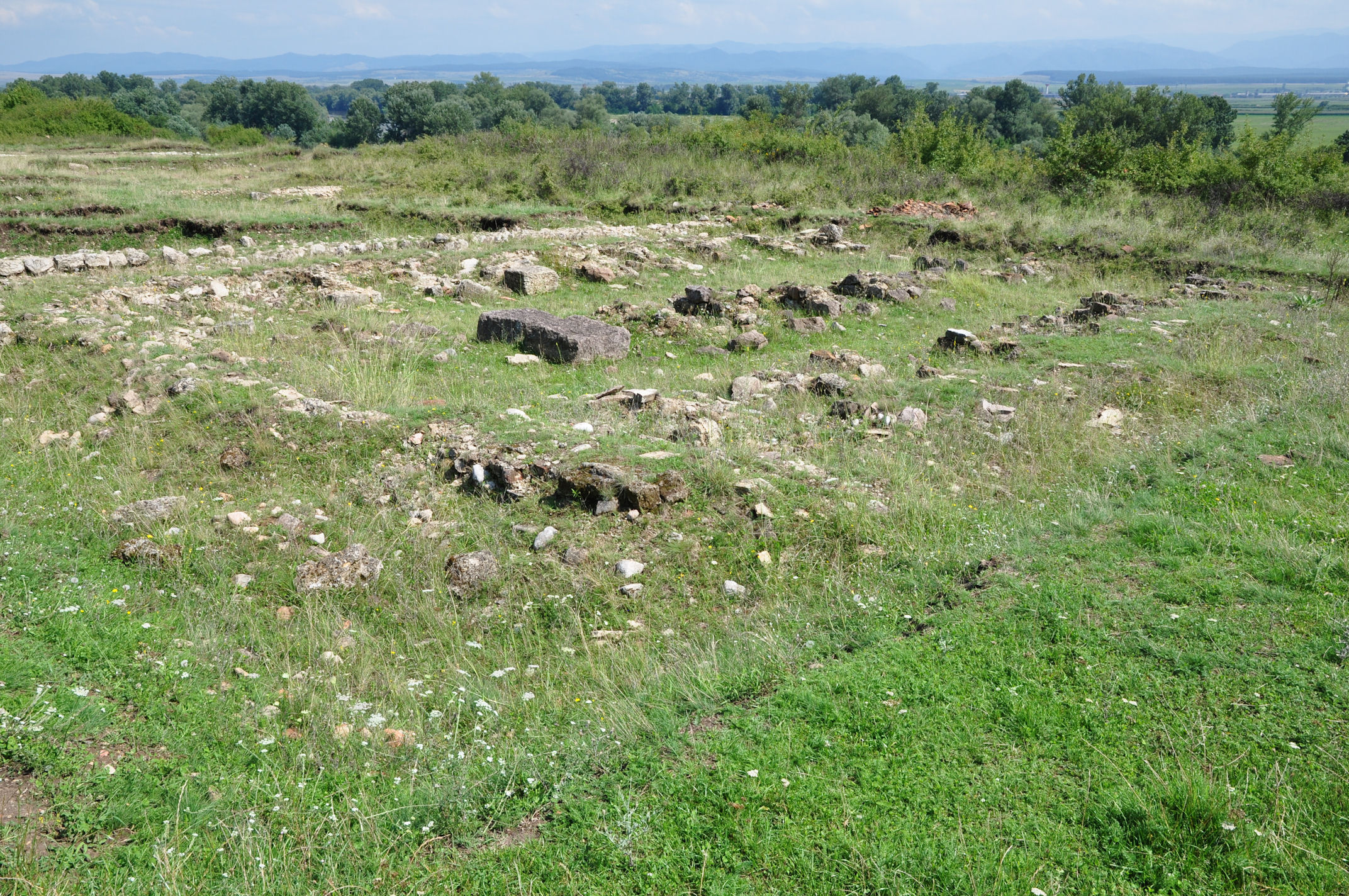
Second horeea next to the first, looking west (2011).

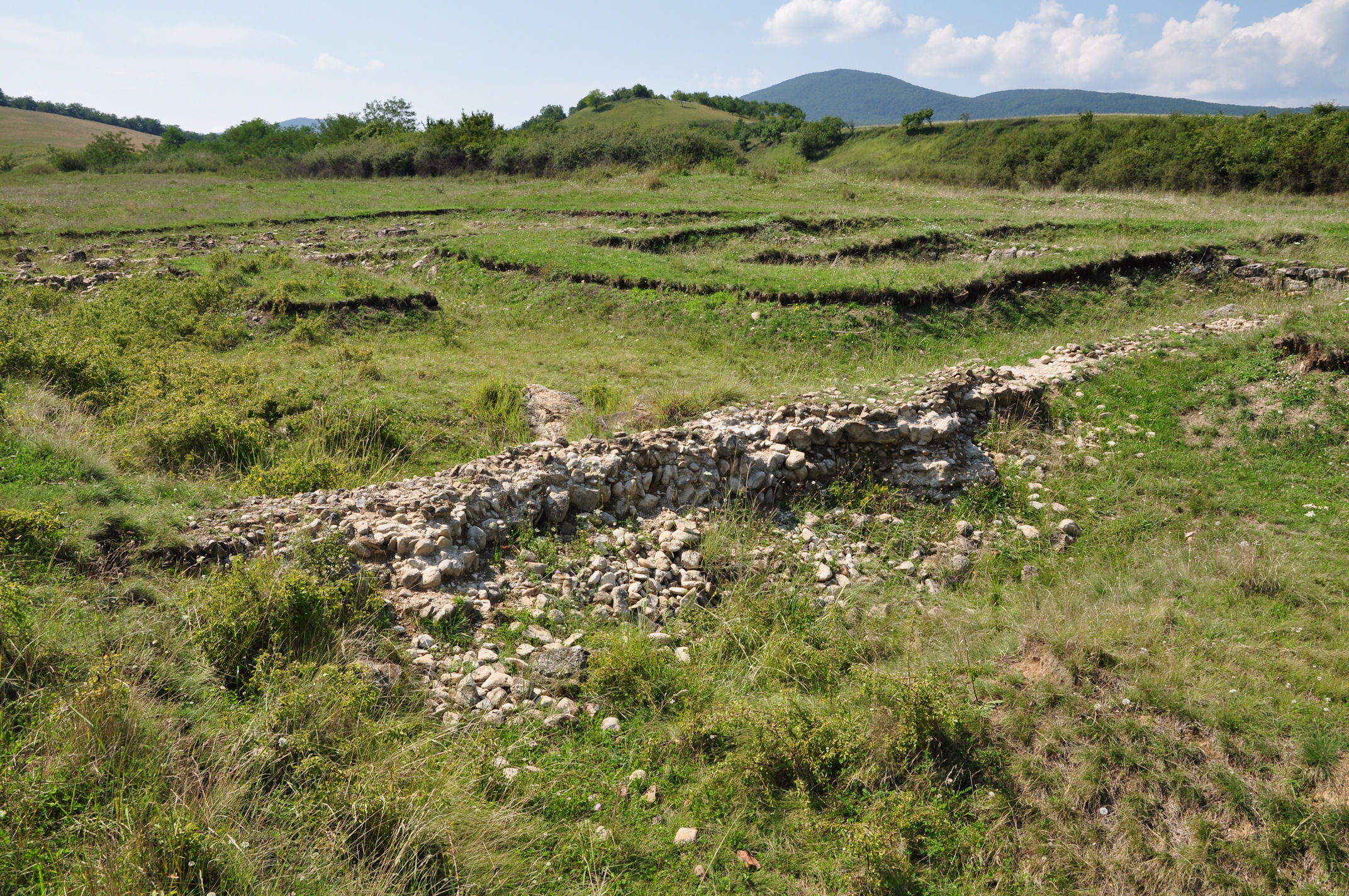
First horeea located near Principia (2011).

Directly west of the Principia, two larger buildings were uncovered, which were referred to as Horrea due to their massive supporting pillars. Their walls do not run parallel to the principia, but deviate by about three meters from the axial alignment to their total length. The first horreum, located directly next to the staff building, is 29 m x 17.50 m (= 507.5 sqm), a rather unusual size for this type of building. Although similarly spacious Horrea have also been proven in other auxiliary sites, it is always double Horrea, which is not indicated by any structural structures or other signs in Cigmău, so that a one-room large building must be assumed. The second Horreum, 28.50 m x 10.50 m (= 299.25 sqm), meets the usual standards.

=== Garrison ===
Vexillationes of Legio XIII Gemina and Numerus Peditum Singularium Britannicianorum, both of which are documented by numerous brick stamps and inscriptions, are mentioned as the ancestral units of the fort Cigmău. Legio XIII Gemina had already taken part in the first Dacian war of Trajan and then moved into its headquarters in the legionary camp Apulum (modern Alba Iulia), from where it detached to various other locations. The Numerus Peditum Singularium Britannicianorum, which was first stationed in the province Moesia Superior, is documented from the year 110 in Dacia, where it probably remained until the end of the Roman occupation of the country. Possibly in the middle of the first century he replaced the troops of Legio XIII Gemina, which was detached to the province of Dalmatia around this time. The last epigraphic record of the numerus from Cigmău (as well as from Dacia) dates back to the year 245.

=== Exhibition ===
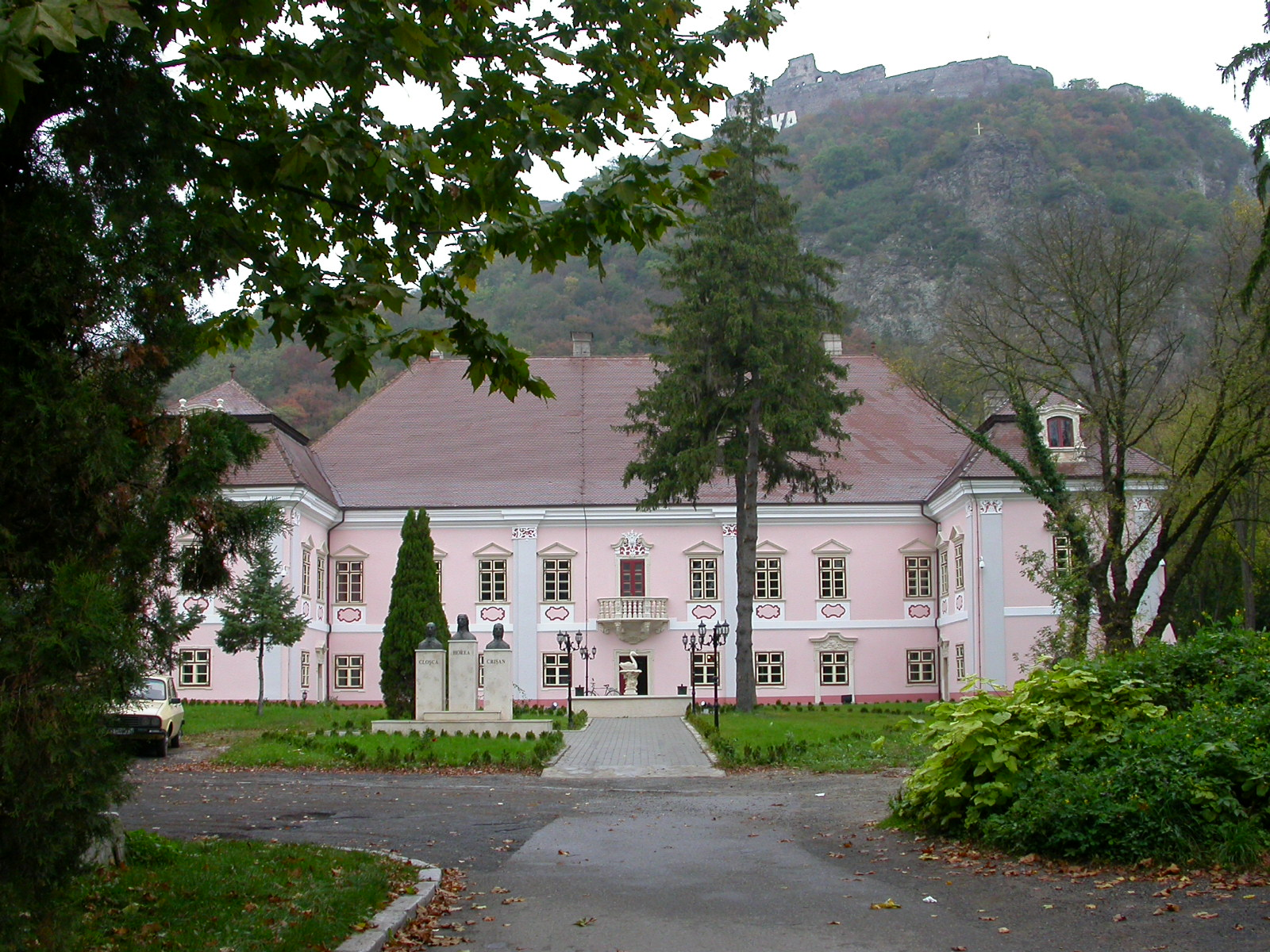
Magna Curia (Castelul Bethlen), seat of Muzeul Civilizației Dacice și Romane in Deva

Archaeological finds from Germisara and the castle Cigmău can be found in Muzeul Civilizaţiei Dacice şi Romane (Museum of Dacian and Roman Civilization), the former Muzeul Județean Hunedoara (Hunedoara District Museum) in Deva.

=== Gallery ===
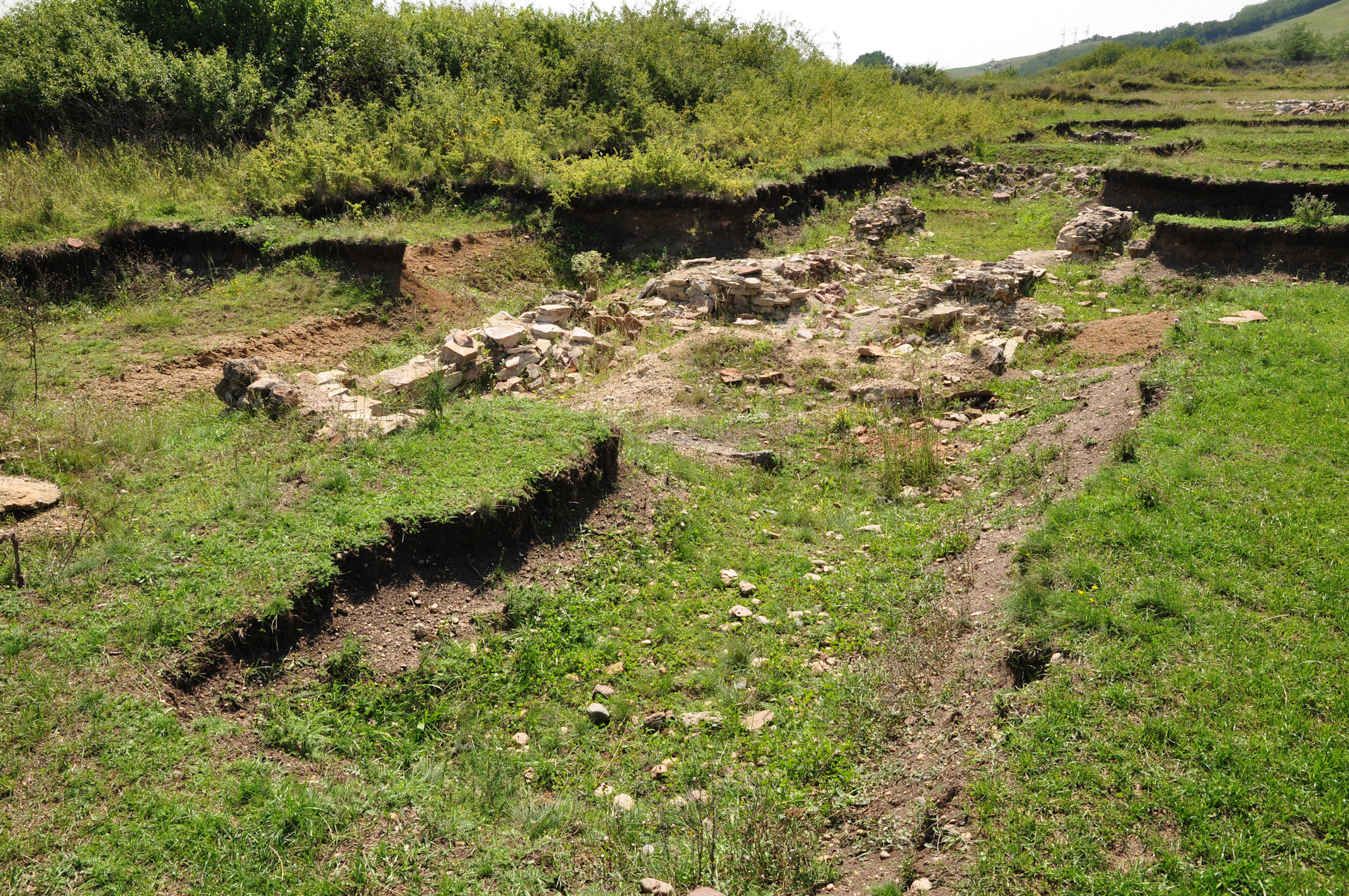

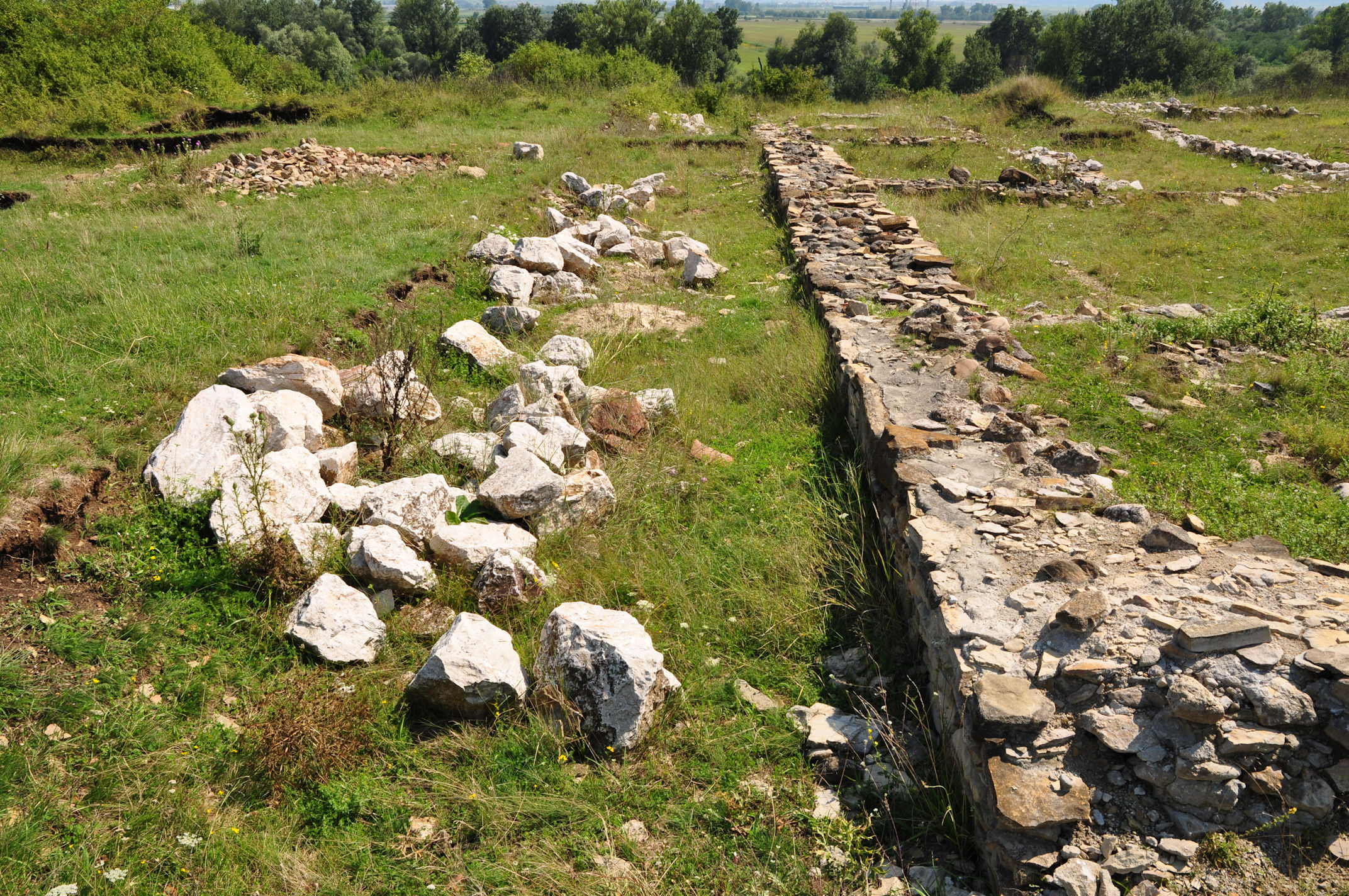

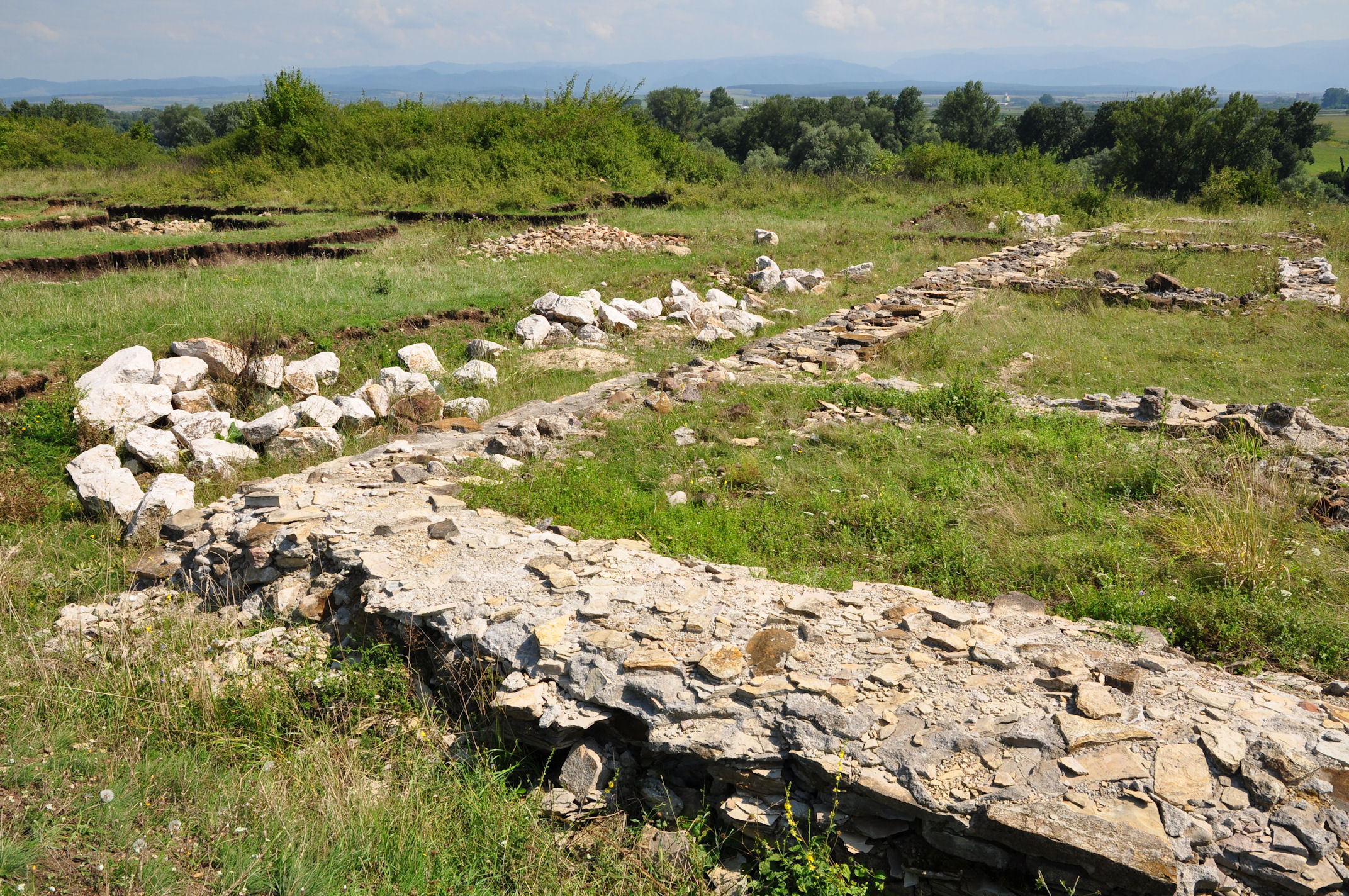

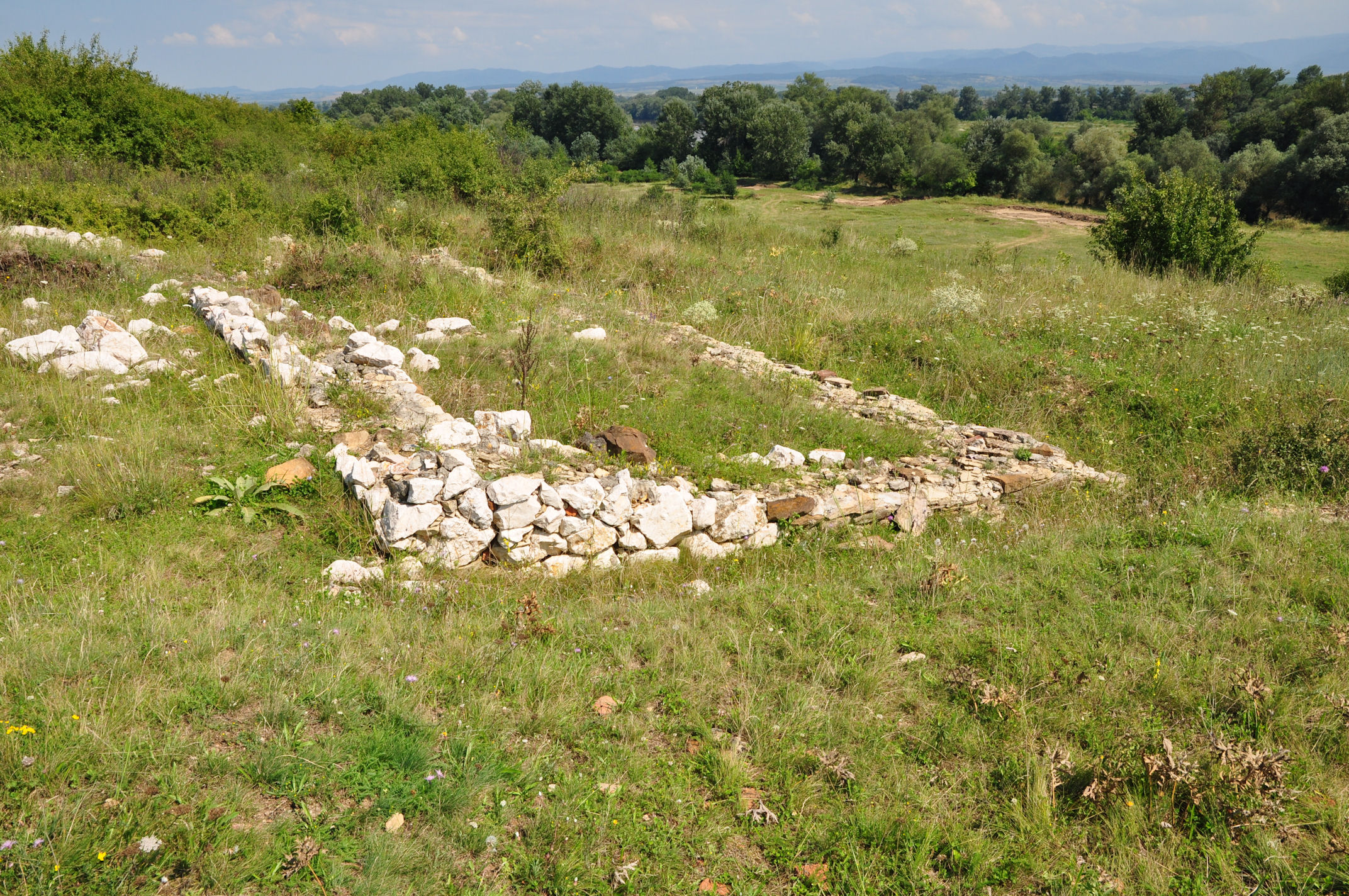

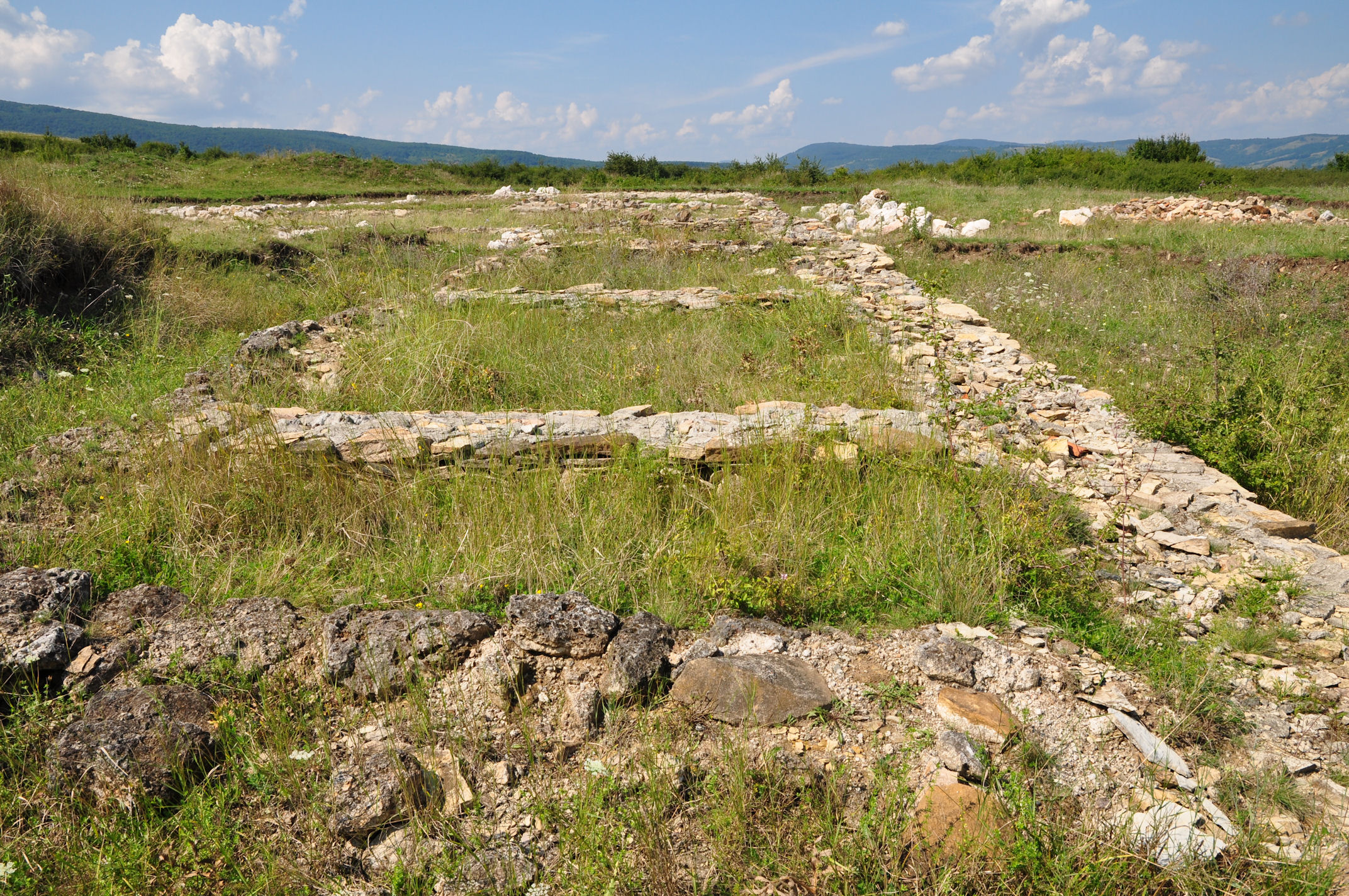

== History of research ==
Even though the site of the fort was known as such for a long time, Nicolae Gudea did not yet know any further details in his 1997 compendium on the forts of the Dacian Limites Apart from the position of the camp, little was known about the military camp until the end of the 20th century. This only changed with the evaluation of aerial and satellite photographs by William S. Hanson and Ioana A. Oltean and the following archaeological excavations under the direction of Adriana and Eugen Pescaru in the years 2000 to 2002.

== Monument protection ==
All the archaeological sites and in particular the castle and thermal baths are protected as historical monuments according to Act No. 422/2001, adopted in 2001, and are listed in the national list of historical monuments (Lista Monumentelor Istorice) with the LMI code HD-I-s-A-03172.37] The Ministry of Culture and National Heritage (Ministerul Culturii și Patrimoniului Național), in particular the General Directorate for National Cultural Heritage, the Department of Fine Arts and the National Commission for Historical Monuments and other institutions subordinate to the Ministry, is responsible for the list. Unauthorised excavations and the export of antique objects are prohibited in Romania.

== See also ==
- List of castra
