= Shibu (name) =

Shibu is an Indian masculine given name and an occasional surname that may refer to the following notable people:

Given name

- Shibu Baby John (born 1963), Indian politician, businessman and film producer
- Shibu Chakravarthy, Indian lyricist, screenwriter, and journalist
- Shibu Gangadharan (born 1972), Indian film director
- Shibu Lal (born 1973), Bangladeshi tennis player
- Shibu Mitra, Indian film director and producer
- Shibu Soren (1944–2025), Indian politician
- Shibu Thekkumpuram, Indian politician and businessman

Surname

- Riya Shibu (born 2004), Indian film producer and actress
