= Geoagiu (Hunedoara) =

Geoagiu Bózes-patak
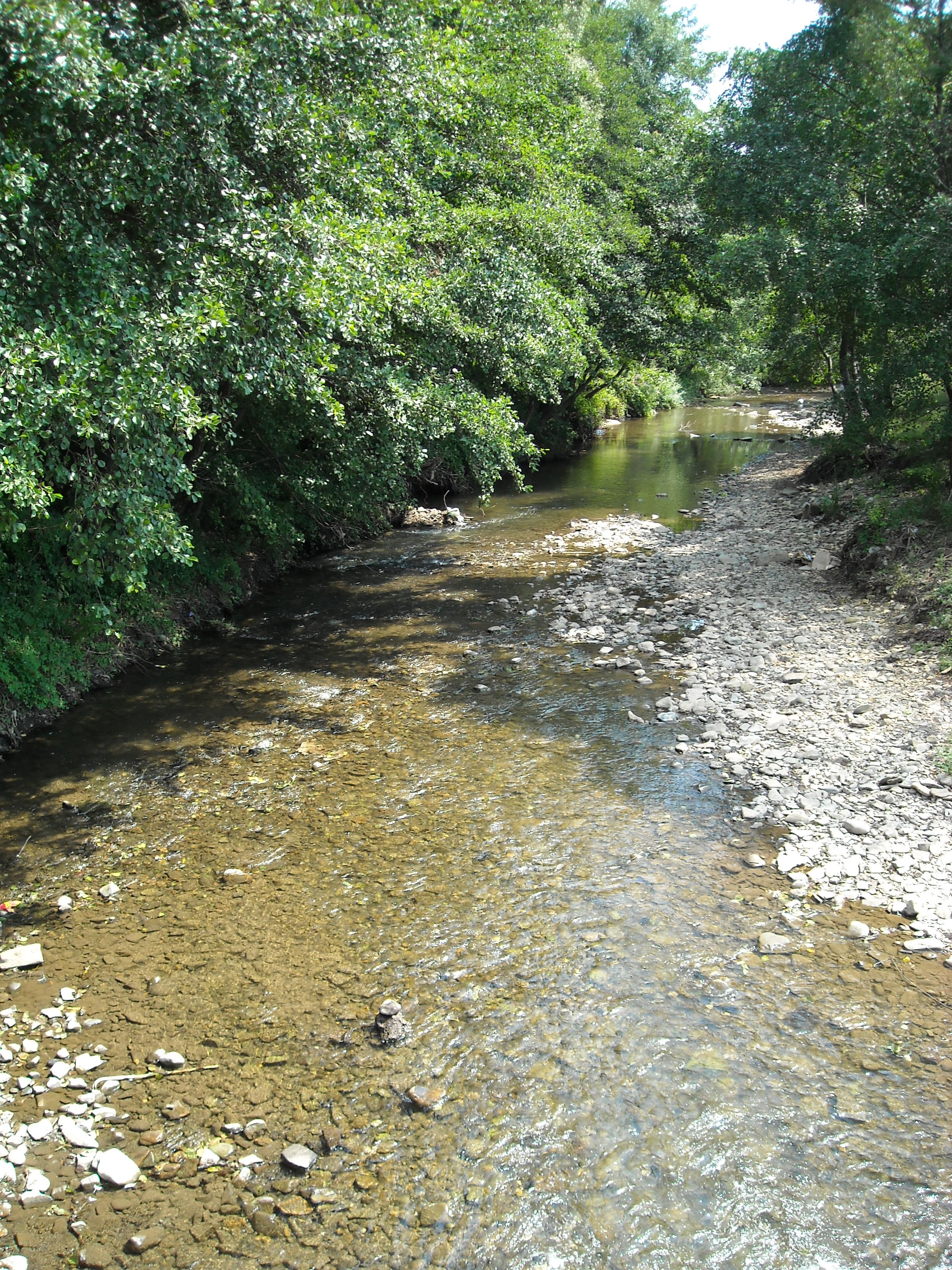

- Location within Romania

Location
- Country: Romania
- Counties: Hunedoara County
- Villages: Bunești, Balșa, Mada, Geoagiu

Physical characteristics
- Mouth: Mureș
  - location: Geoagiu
  - coordinates: 45°54′14″N 23°13′10″E
- Length: 41 km (25 mi)
- Basin size: 326 km^{2} (126 sq mi)

Basin features
- Progression: Mureș→ Tisza→ Danube→ Black Sea
- Tributaries
  - left: Almășel, Băcâia
  - right: Valea Porcului, Gura Văii, Valea Roșie

The Geoagiu (Hungarian: Bózes-patak) is a right tributary of the river Mureș in Romania. It discharges into the Mureș in the town Geoagiu. Its length is 41 km (25 mi) and its basin size is 326 km^{2} (126 sq mi).
