= Almașu Mare =

- Commune
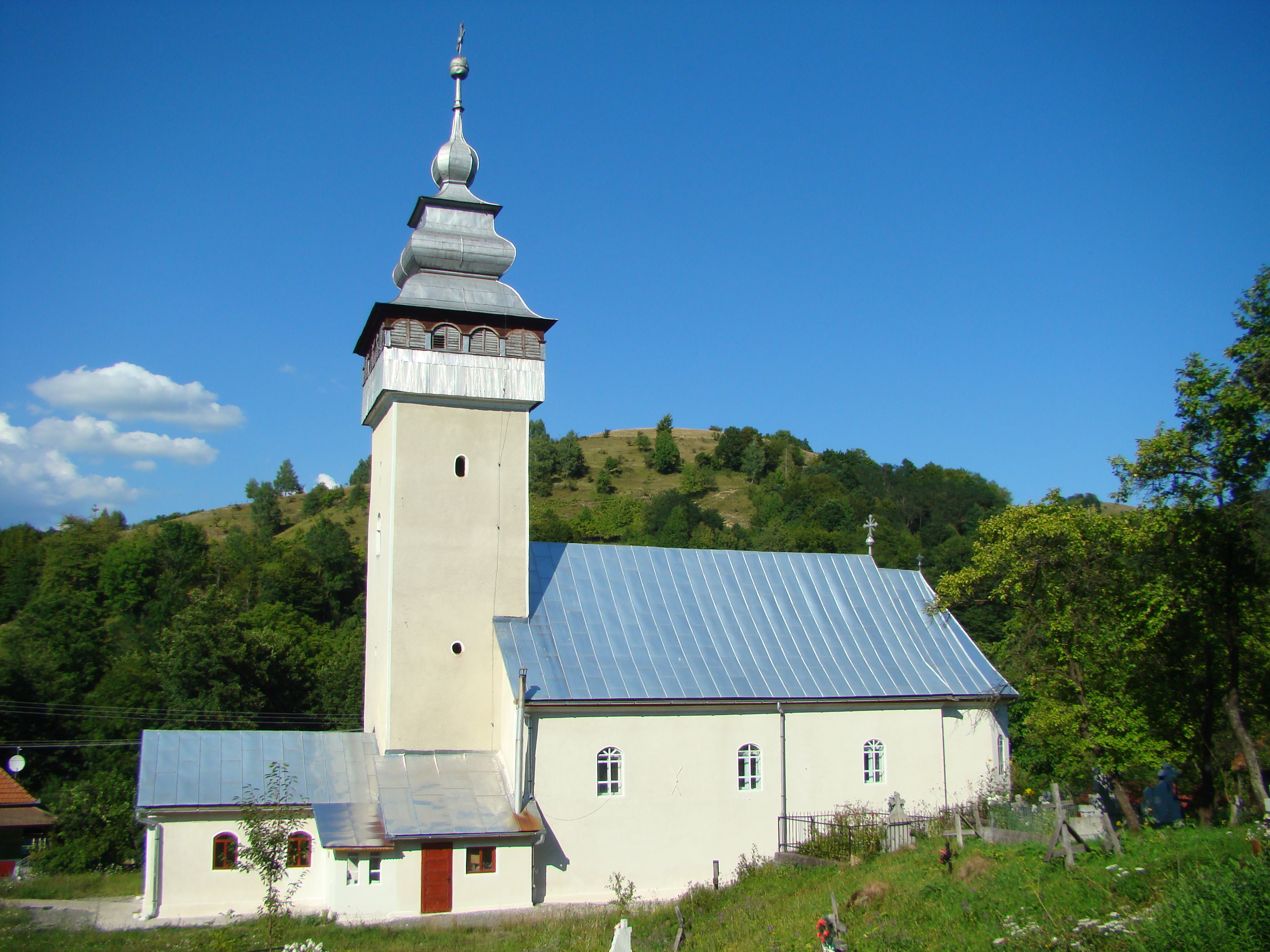
- Church of the Transfiguration in Almașu Mare

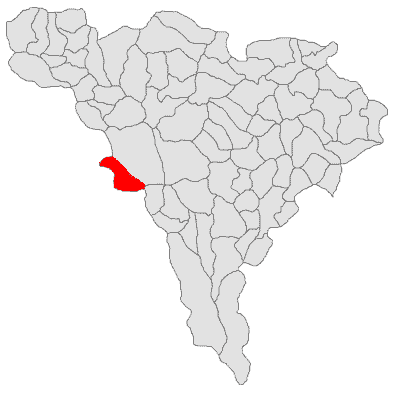
- Location in Alba County

- Location in Romania
- Coordinates: 46°5′24″N 23°7′51″E
- Country: Romania
- County: Alba

Government
  - Mayor (2020–2024): Aron Zaharie (PNL)
- Area: 89.3 km^{2} (34.5 sq mi)
- Elevation: 667 m (2,188 ft)
- Population (2021-12-01): 1,048
  - Density: 11.7/km^{2} (30.4/sq mi)
- Time zone: UTC+02:00 (EET)
  - Summer (DST): UTC+03:00 (EEST)
- Postal code: 517030
- Area code: +40 x59
- Vehicle reg.: AB

Almașu Mare (German: Groß-Obstdorf; Hungarian: Nagyalmás) is a commune located in Alba County, Transylvania, Romania.

Historical population
Year	Pop.	±%
1850	2,769	—
1900	3,286	+18.7%
1930	3,486	+6.1%
1966	3,945	+13.2%
2002	1,690	−57.2%
2011	1,289	−23.7%
2021	1,048	−18.7%
Source: INS, Census data

With a population of 1,048 according to the 2021 census, the commune is composed of seven villages: Almașu Mare, Almașu de Mijloc, Brădet, Cib, Cheile Cibului, Glod, and Nădăștia. Its current mayor, as of 2020, is Aron Zaharie. A former mining centre for gold, its income comes now mainly from agricultural and agrotouristical activities.

Almașu Mare's tourist objectives are the Cibu Gorges, the Glod Gorges, a thermal spring, and the Achim Emilian ethnographical museum.

In Romanian	In German	In Hungarian
Almașu Mare	Groß-Obstdorf	Nagyalmás
Almașu de Mijloc		Középalmás
Brădet	Tannenbach	Bregyét
Cib	Tropfbach	Cseb
Cheile Cibului	Theyenport	Tyéj
Glod	Kloden	Glod
Nădăștia	Rohrfeld	Nádasdia
