= Romos =

- Commune
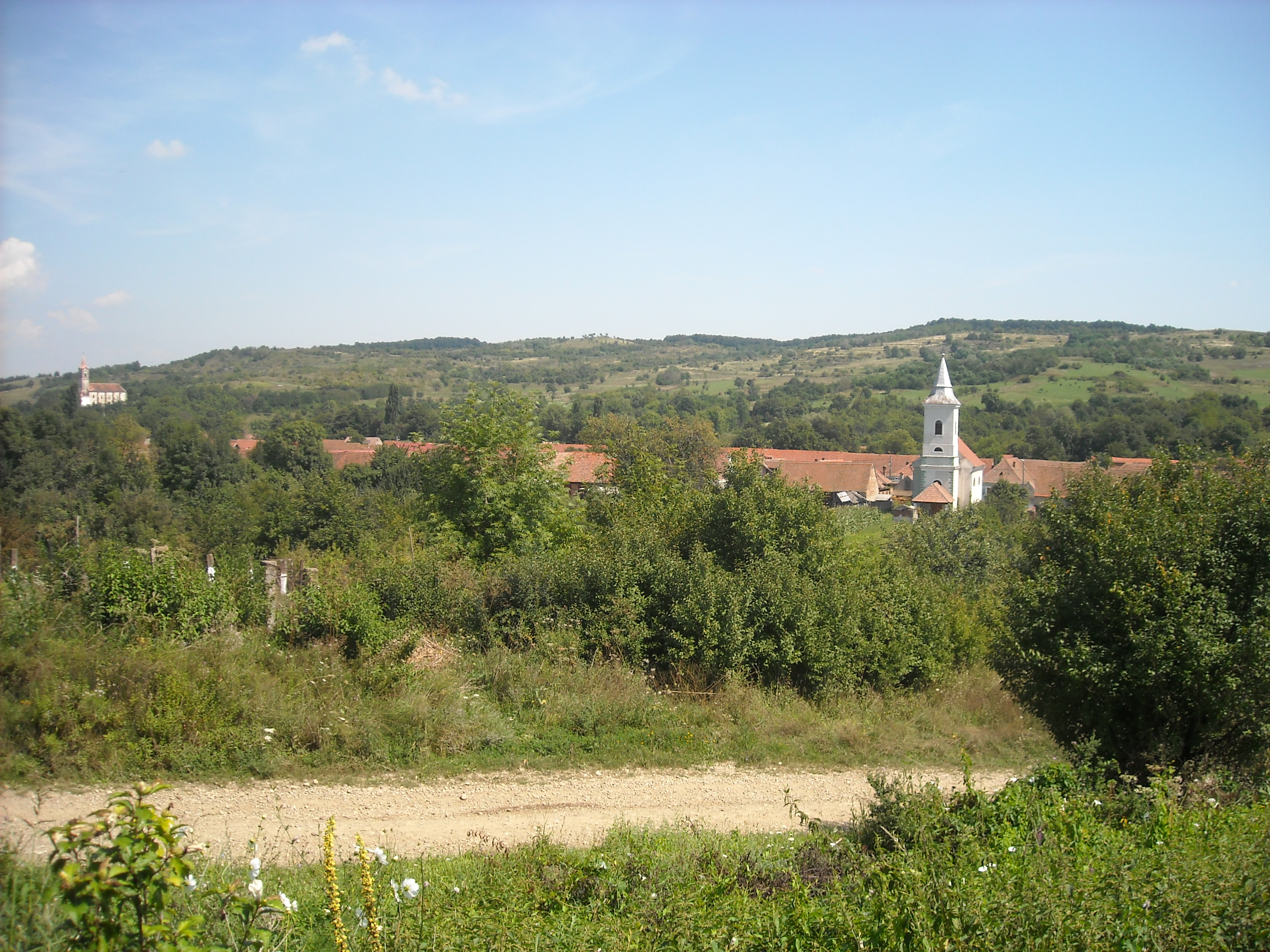
- Romos village

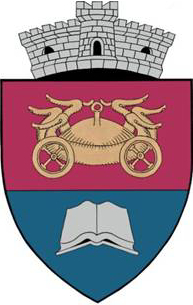
- Coat of arms

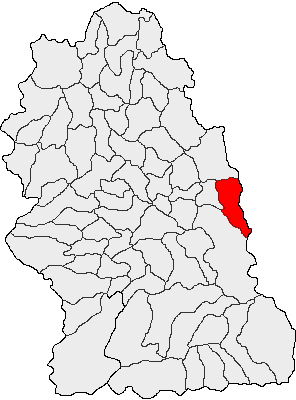
- Location in Hunedoara County

- Location in Romania
- Coordinates: 45°50′N 23°17′E
- Country: Romania
- County: Hunedoara

Government
  - Mayor (2021–2024): Daniela-Mihaiela Csatlos-Koncz (PNL)
- Area: 74 km^{2} (29 sq mi)
- Elevation: 256 m (840 ft)
- Population (2021-12-01): 2,388
  - Density: 32/km^{2} (84/sq mi)
- Time zone: UTC+02:00 (EET)
  - Summer (DST): UTC+03:00 (EEST)
- Postal code: 337410
- Area code: (+40) 0254
- Vehicle reg.: HD
- Website: romos.ro

Romos (German: Rumes; Hungarian: Romosz) is a commune in Hunedoara County, Transylvania, Romania. It is composed of five villages: Ciungu Mare (Csunzshavas), Pișchinți (Piskinc), Romos, Romoșel (Romoszhely), and Vaidei (Vajdej).

The commune is located at the southwestern edge of the Transylvanian Plateau, north of the Șureanu Mountains, at an altitude of 256 m (840 ft). It lies on the banks of the river Romos, a left tributary of the Mureș. Romos is located in the eastern part of Hunedoara County, 7 km (4.3 mi) from the city of Orăștie and 31 km (19 mi) from the county seat, Deva, on the border with Alba County.

Historical population
| Year | Pop. | ±% |
|---|---|---|
| 1850 | 5,187 | — |
| 1910 | 5,251 | +1.2% |
| 2002 | 2,855 | −45.6% |
| 2011 | 2,604 | −8.8% |
| 2021 | 2,388 | −8.3% |
Source: INS, Census data
