= Balșa =

- Commune
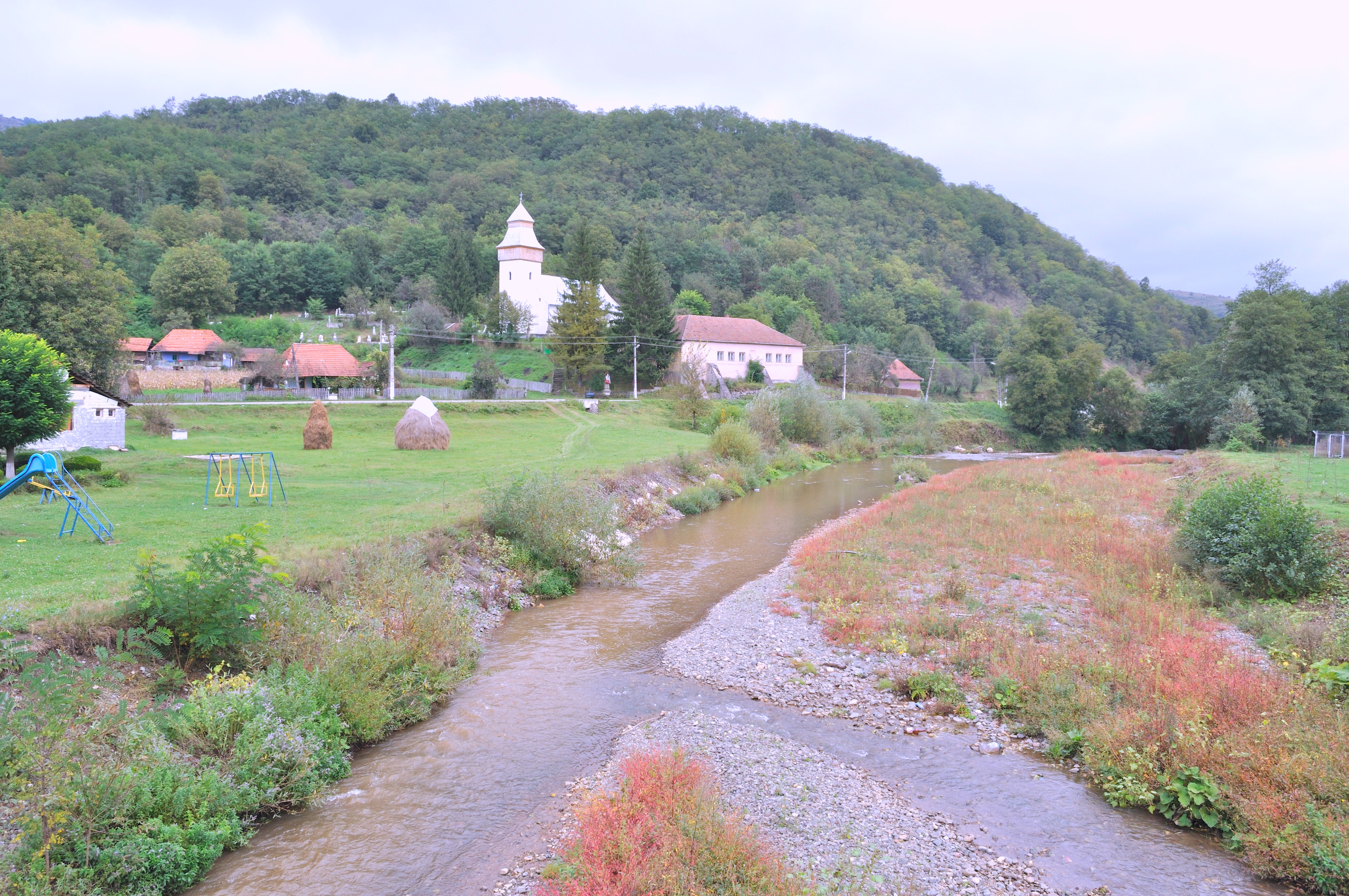
- Balșa village

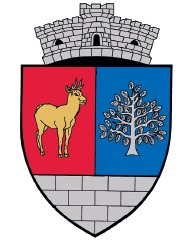
- Coat of arms

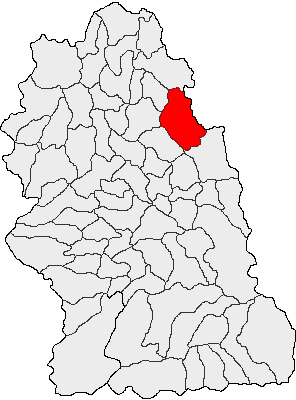
- Location in Hunedoara County

- Location in Romania
- Coordinates: 46°2′N 23°7′E
- Country: Romania
- County: Hunedoara

Government
  - Mayor (2024–2028): Traian Felician Jude (PNL)
- Area: 154.69 km^{2} (59.73 sq mi)
- Elevation: 526 m (1,726 ft)
- Population (2021-12-01): 753
  - Density: 4.87/km^{2} (12.6/sq mi)
- Time zone: UTC+02:00 (EET)
  - Summer (DST): UTC+03:00 (EEST)
- Postal code: 337015
- Area code: +40 x59
- Vehicle reg.: HD
- Website: www.balsa.ro

Balșa (Hungarian: Balsa, German: Baleschen or Balza) is a commune in Hunedoara County, Transylvania, Romania. It is composed of fourteen villages: Almașu Mic de Munte (Kisalmás), Ardeu (Erdőfalva), Balșa, Bunești (Bunesd), Galbina (Galbina), Mada (Máda), Oprișești, Poiana (Pojána), Poienița (Váleajepi), Roșia, Stăuini, Techereu (Tekerő), Vălișoara (until 1960 Porcurea; Porkura), and Voia (Voja).

At the 2021 census, the commune had a population of 753; of those, 91.18% were Romanians and 1.2% were Roma.

Historical population
Year	Pop.	±%
1850	4,033	—
1910	6,200	+53.7%
2002	1,217	−80.4%
2011	871	−28.4%
2021	753	−13.5%
Source: Census data
