= Geoagiu =

- Town
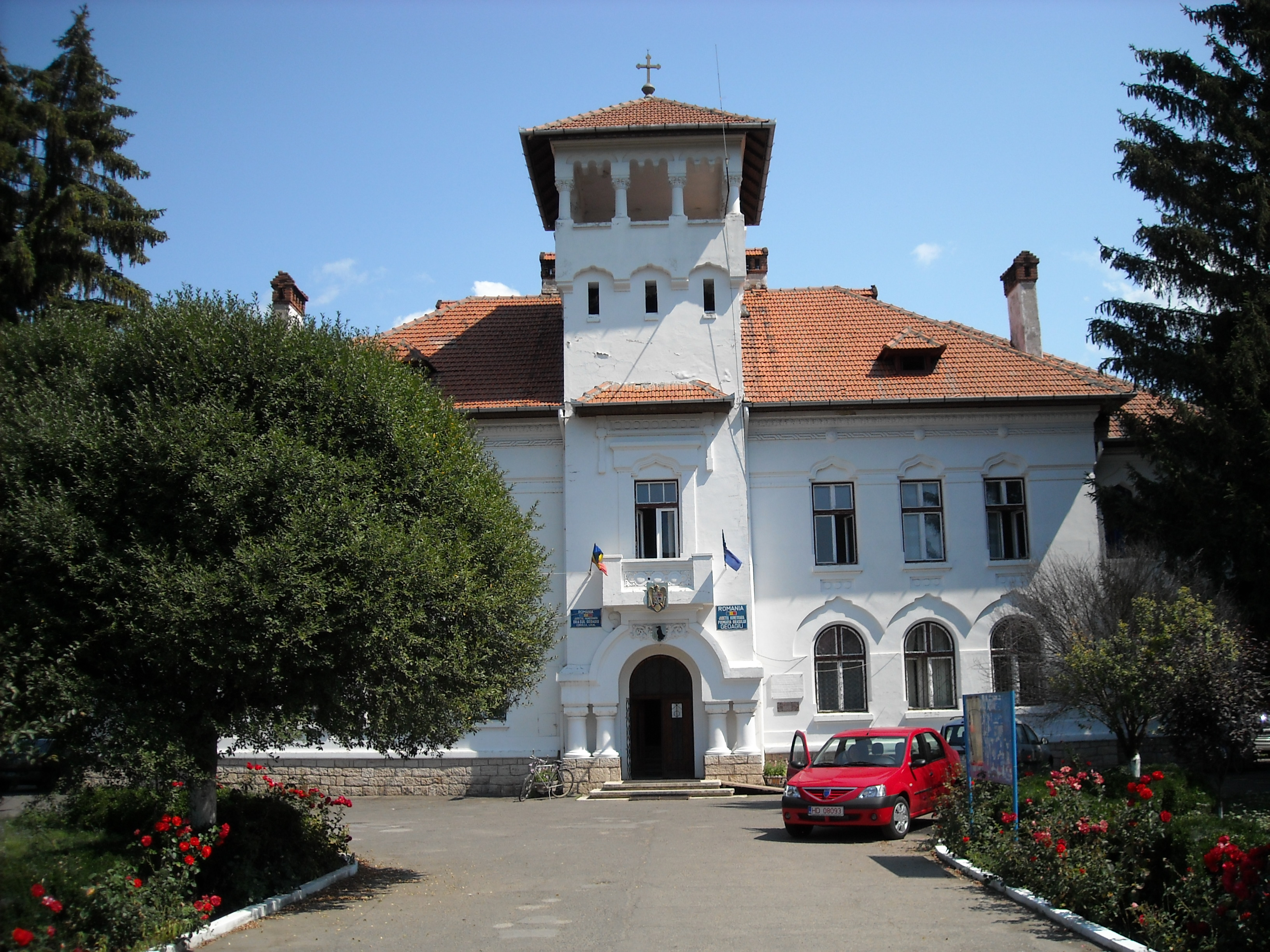
- Agricultural high school in Geoagiu

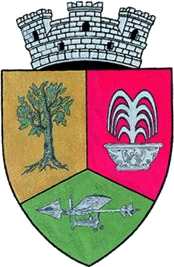
- Coat of arms

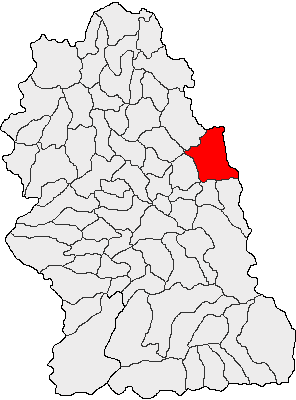
- Location in Hunedoara County

- Location in Romania
- Coordinates: 45°55′12″N 23°12′0″E
- Country: Romania
- County: Hunedoara

Government
  - Mayor (2024–2028): Ovidiu Vlad (PNL)
- Area: 155.69 km^{2} (60.11 sq mi)
- Elevation: 217 m (712 ft)
- Population (2021-12-01): 5,087
  - Density: 32.67/km^{2} (84.63/sq mi)
- Time zone: UTC+02:00 (EET)
  - Summer (DST): UTC+03:00 (EEST)
- Postal code: 335400
- Area code: (+40) 02 54
- Vehicle reg.: HD
- Website: www.geoagiu.ro

Geoagiu (Hungarian: Algyógy, German: Gergesdorf) is a town in Hunedoara County, in the historical region of Transylvania, Romania. It administers ten villages: Aurel Vlaicu (until 1925 Binținți; Bencenc), Băcâia (Bakonya), Bozeș (Bózes), Cigmău (Csigmó), Gelmar (Gyalmár), Geoagiu-Băi (Feredőgyógy), Homorod (Homoród), Mermezeu-Văleni (Nyírmező), Renghet (Renget), and Văleni (Valény).

== Geography ==
The town lies on the banks of the Mureș River, at an altitude of 217 m (712 ft) above sea level. The river with the same name (Geoagiu) and the river Romos flow in this place into the Mureș. Geoagiu is located in the eastern part of Hunedoara County, 11 km (6.8 mi) north of the city of Orăștie and 29 km (18 mi) east of the county seat, Deva, on the border with Alba County.

The A1 motorway and the national road DN7 (which link Bucharest with the Banat region, in western Romania) pass through the southern side of the town. The Aurel Vlaicu and Geoagiu train stations serve the CFR Main Line 200, running in the same direction.

== History ==
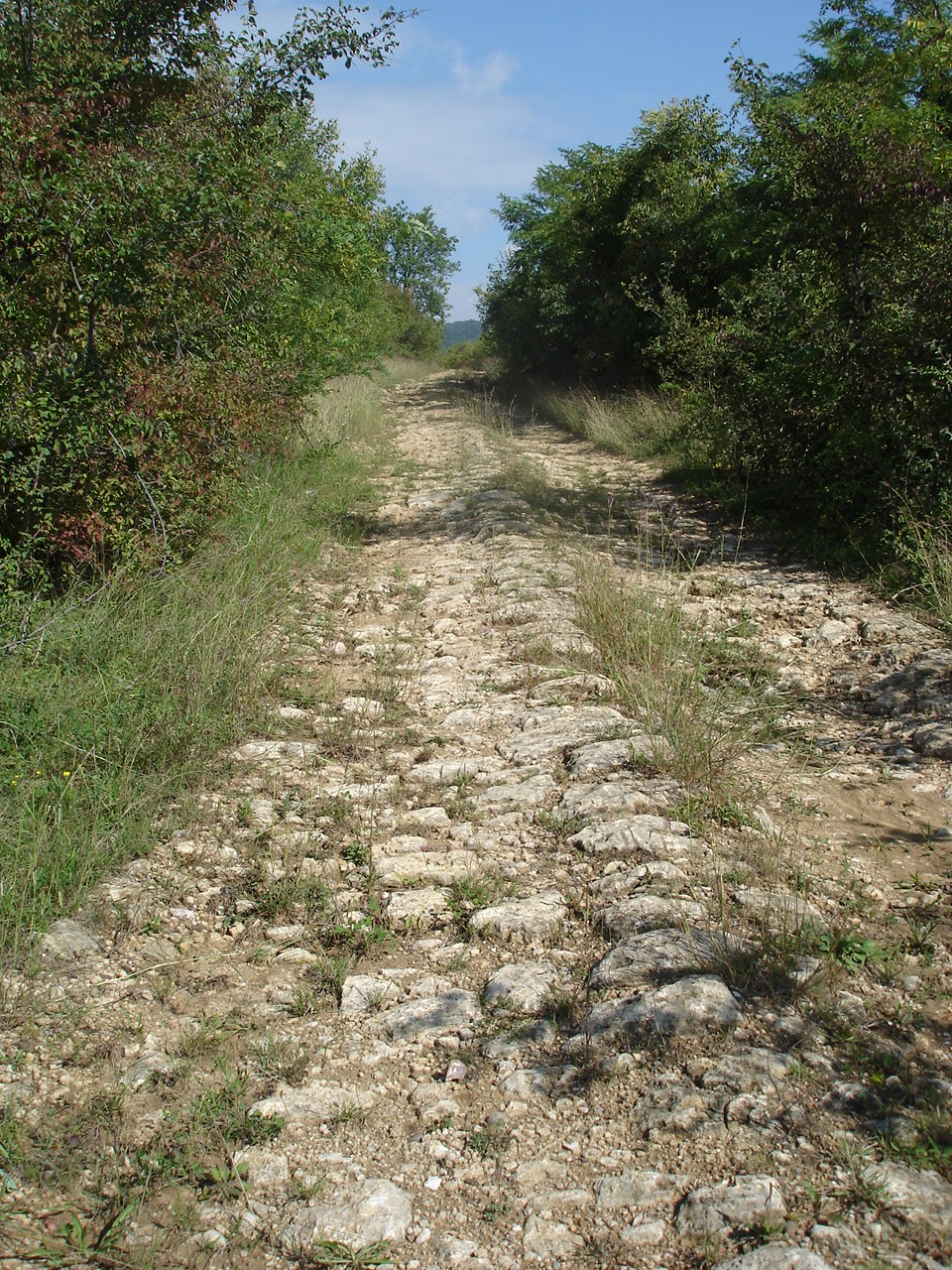
Ancient Roman road between Geoagiu-Băi and the hamlet Poienari

The first settlements in the area can be found in the time of the Dacians, in the 1st century BC, as shown by archeological discoveries. After the Roman conquest, the Romans built the fort of Germisara in the 2nd century, however, it kept the original Dacian name.

The name of Germisara meant "hot water" (germi = "heat", sara = "waterfall") and it showed that the Dacians already knew of the thermal springs of the area. Germisara (Germizera/Germihera) is listed in the Tabula Peutingeriana, Geographike Hyphegesis of Claudius Ptolemy and the Ravenna Cosmography.

The modern name probably came from the Hungarian name of the Geoagiu River (Gyógy), which means "curative". But more probably, the name is coming from the Hungarian word dió (nut as fruit) with the suffix -d, so, after the first documentary citation, "villa Gyog" from 1291 appeared as Dyod és Dyog (1397), Aldyogh (1407), Algyogh (1412), Aldyod (1439), Alsodyod alio nomine Alsoffalwa (around 1444). The first documentary citation of Geoagiu (it was written as "villa Gyog") was in the year 1291, when it was used as a land in the vicinity of Binținți (now the village Aurel Vlaicu).

There are remains of the old Roman road from Geoagiu to Geoagiu-Băi made of flat stones.

== Demographics ==
Historical population
Year	Pop.	±%
2002	6,290	—
2011	5,049	−19.7%
2021	5,087	+0.8%
Source: Census data

At the 2011 census, Geoagiu had 5,049 inhabitants; of those, 89.7% were Romanians, 8.81% Roma, and 0.71% Hungarians. At the 2021 census, the town had a population of 5,087, of which 75.62% were Romanians and 14.53% Roma.

== Natives ==
- Ion Budai-Deleanu (1760–1820), philologist, historian, and poet
- Kocsárd Kún (1803–1895), educator and politician
- György Puskás (1911–2004), physician and academic
- Aurel Vlaicu (1882–1913), engineer, inventor, airplane constructor, and early pilot

== See also ==
- Germisara (castra)
