= Târnava Mică =

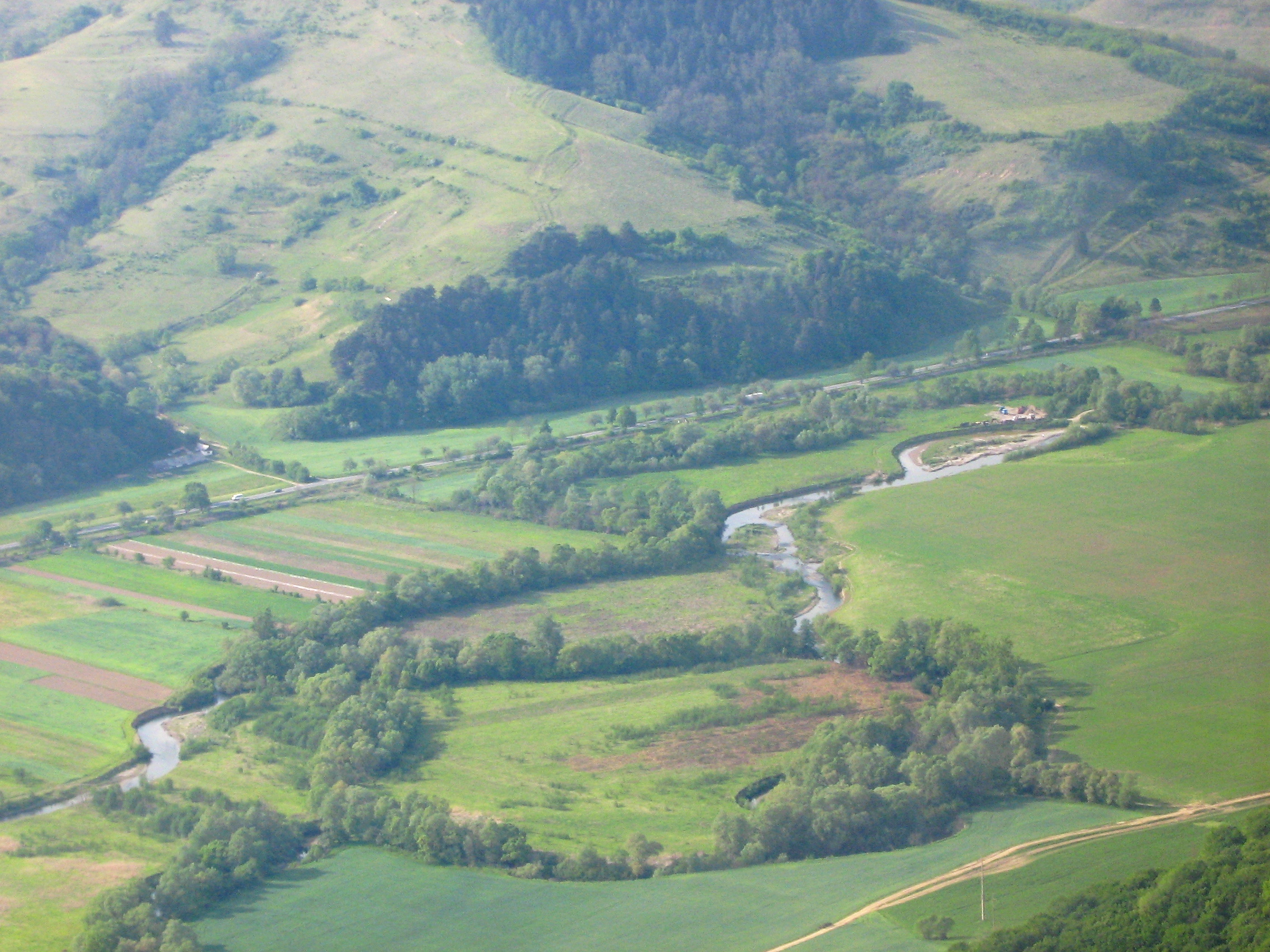

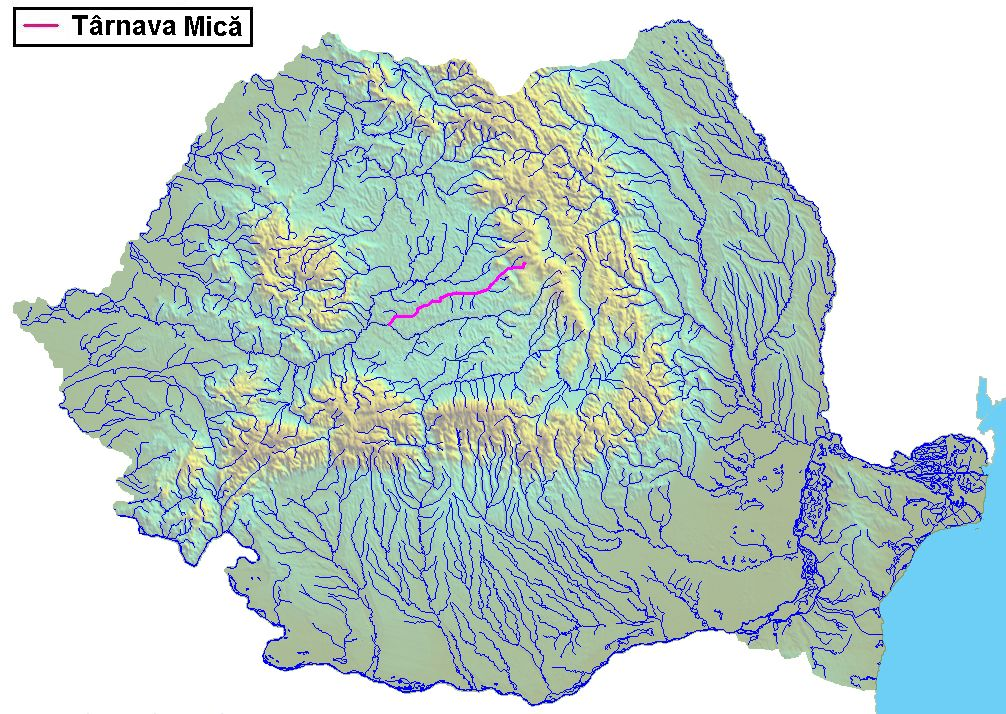

Location
- Country: Romania
- Counties: Harghita, Mureș, Alba
- Towns: Sovata, Târnăveni, Blaj

Physical characteristics
- Source: Gurghiu Mountains
  - elevation: 1,190 m (3,900 ft)
- Mouth: Târnava
  - location: Blaj
  - coordinates: 46°10′16″N 23°53′31″E
  - elevation: 255 m (837 ft)
- Length: 196 km (122 mi)
- Basin size: 2,071 km^{2} (800 sq mi)
- Discharge
  - location: *
  - average: 10.0 m^{3}/s (350 cu ft/s)

Basin features
- Progression: Târnava→ Mureș→ Tisza→ Danube→ Black Sea

The Târnava Mică ("Small Târnava"; Hungarian: Kis-Küküllő; German: Kleine Kokel) is a river in Romania. Its total length is 196 km (122 mi), and its drainage basin area is 2,071 km^{2} (800 sq mi). Its source is in the Eastern Carpathian Mountains, in Harghita County. It flows to the west through the Romanian counties Harghita, Mureș, and Alba, more or less parallel to and north from the Târnava Mare. The cities of Sovata and Târnăveni lie on the Târnava Mică. It joins the Târnava Mare in Blaj, forming the Târnava.

== Towns and villages ==
The following towns and villages are situated along the river Târnava Mică, from source to mouth: Praid, Sovata, Sărățeni, Chibed, Ghindari, Sângeorgiu de Pădure, Fântânele, Bălăușeri, Coroisânmărtin, Suplac, Mica, Gănești, Târnăveni, Adămuș, Crăiești, Cetatea de Baltă, Jidvei, Șona, Sâncel, Blaj.

== Tributaries ==
The following rivers are tributaries to the river Târnava Mică (from source to mouth):

Left: Praid, Corund, Solocma, Ceia, Cușmed, Șenie, Roua, Vețca, Ciortoș, Nadeș, Agrișteu, Domald, Seleuș, Sântioana, Cund, Botoș, Hărănglab, Băgaciu, Sărata, Saroș, Adămuș, Balta, Spinoasa, Graben, Ror, Valea Mare

Right: Creanga Mare, Iuhod, Sovata, Becheci, Ghegheș, Veseuș, Broaga, Pănade
