= Panades =

Panades or Panadés is a Spanish surname. Notable people with the surname include:

== People ==
- David Panadès (1920–2003), Spanish footballer
- Antonio Bertrán Panadés (1933–2008), Spanish professional road cyclist
- Enric Ismael Martin Panades (born 1980), Spanish track and field athlete and sighted guide

== See also ==
- Panade (disambiguation)
- Penedès
