= Solocma =

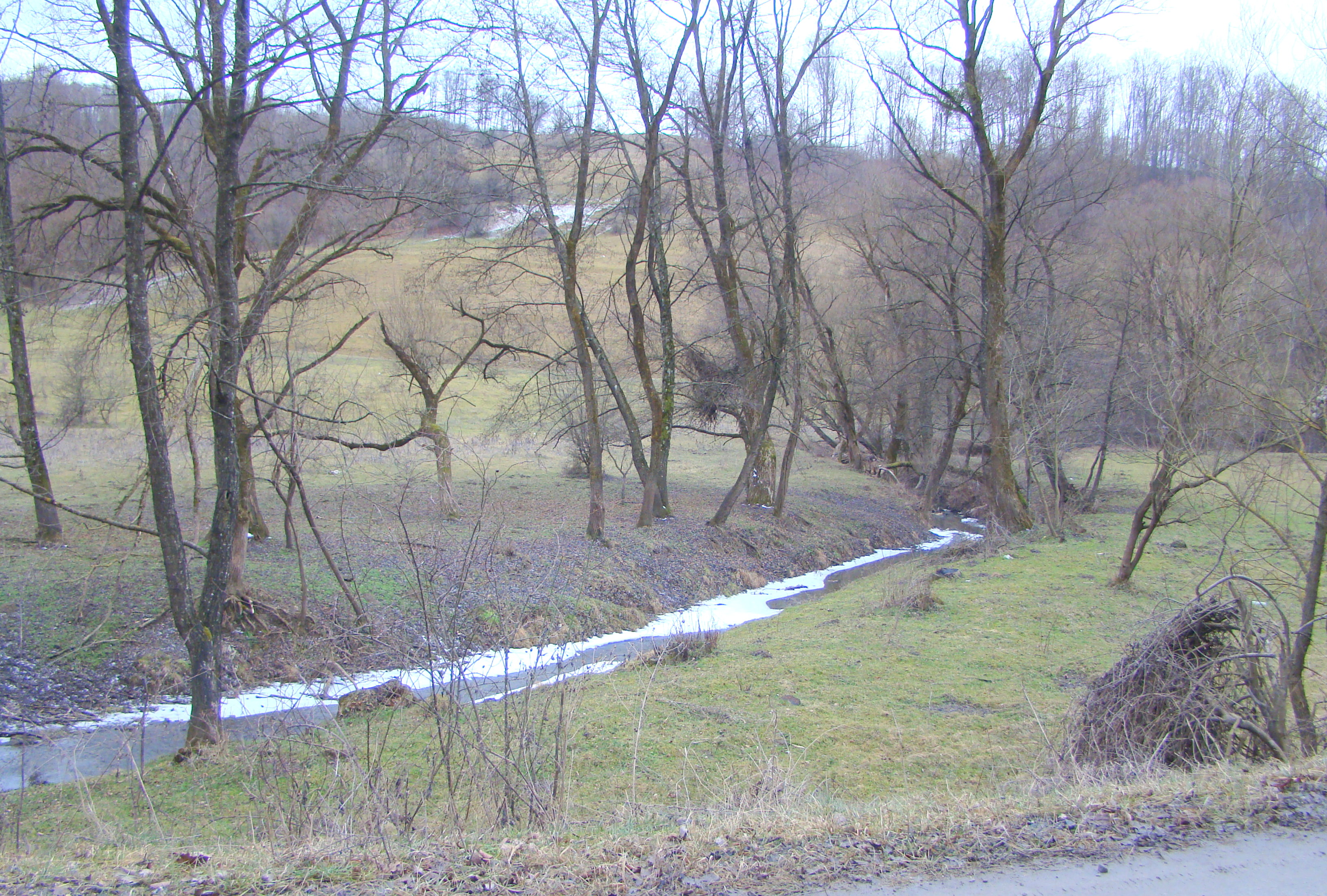

- Location within Romania

Location
- Country: Romania
- Counties: Harghita, Mureș
- Villages: Șiclod, Solocma

Physical characteristics
- Mouth: Târnava Mică
  - location: Ghindari
  - coordinates: 46.4994°N 24.9373°E
- Length: 16 km (9.9 mi)
- Basin size: 35 km^{2} (14 sq mi)

Basin features
- Progression: Târnava Mică→ Târnava→ Mureș→ Tisza→ Danube→ Black Sea

The Solocma is a left tributary of the river Târnava Mică in Romania. It flows into the Târnava Mică in Ghindari. Its length is 16 km (9.9 mi) and its basin size is 35 km^{2} (14 sq mi).
