= Panade =

Panade may refer to:

== Cuisine ==
- A Belizean empanada
- Panada, a kind of bread soup
- Panade, the roux used to prepare choux pastry

== Places ==
- Pănade, a river in Alba County, Romania
- Pănade, a village in the commune of Sâncel, Alba County, Romania

== See also ==
- Panade à Champignac, the nineteenth album of the Spirou et Fantasio series
