= Nadeș (river) =

- Location within Romania

Location
- Country: Romania
- Counties: Mureș County
- Villages: Pipea, Nadeș, Țigmandru, Chendu

Physical characteristics
- Mouth: Târnava Mică
  - location: Chendu
  - coordinates: 46.4003°N 24.7234°E
- Length: 19 km (12 mi)
- Basin size: 66 km^{2} (25 sq mi)

Basin features
- Progression: Târnava Mică→ Târnava→ Mureș→ Tisza→ Danube→ Black Sea
- Tributaries
  - left: Podei, Măgheruș

The Nadeș is a left tributary of the river Târnava Mică in Romania. It discharges into the Târnava Mică in Chendu. Its length is 19 km (12 mi) and its basin size is 66 km^{2} (25 sq mi).
