= Cușmed =

- Location within Romania

Location
- Country: Romania
- Counties: Harghita, Mureș
- Villages: Cușmed, Atid, Crișeni, Bezid

Physical characteristics
- Mouth: Târnava Mică
  - location: Sângeorgiu de Pădure
  - coordinates: 46.4312°N 24.8487°E
- Length: 28 km (17 mi)
- Basin size: 157 km^{2} (61 sq mi)

Basin features
- Progression: Târnava Mică→ Târnava→ Mureș→ Tisza→ Danube→ Black Sea
- Tributaries
  - left: Firtuș, Bezid

The Cușmed is a left tributary of the river Târnava Mică in Romania. It discharges into the Târnava Mică in Sângeorgiu de Pădure. Its length is 28 km (17 mi) and its basin size is 157 km^{2} (61 sq mi).
