= Agrișteu =

River in Romania

- Location within Romania

Location
- Country: Romania
- Counties: Mureș County
- Villages: Senereuș, Agrișteu

Physical characteristics
- Mouth: Târnava Mică
  - location: Agrișteu
  - coordinates: 46.3951°N 24.6784°E
- Length: 14 km (8.7 mi)
- Basin size: 39 km^{2} (15 sq mi)

Basin features
- Progression: Târnava Mică→ Târnava→ Mureș→ Tisza→ Danube→ Black Sea

The Agrișteu or Senereuș (Hungarian: Egres-patak or Szénaverős-patak) is a left tributary of the river Târnava Mică in Romania. It flows into the Târnava Mică in the village Agrișteu. Its length is 14 km (8.7 mi) and its basin size is 39 km^{2} (15 sq mi).
