= Ghegheș =

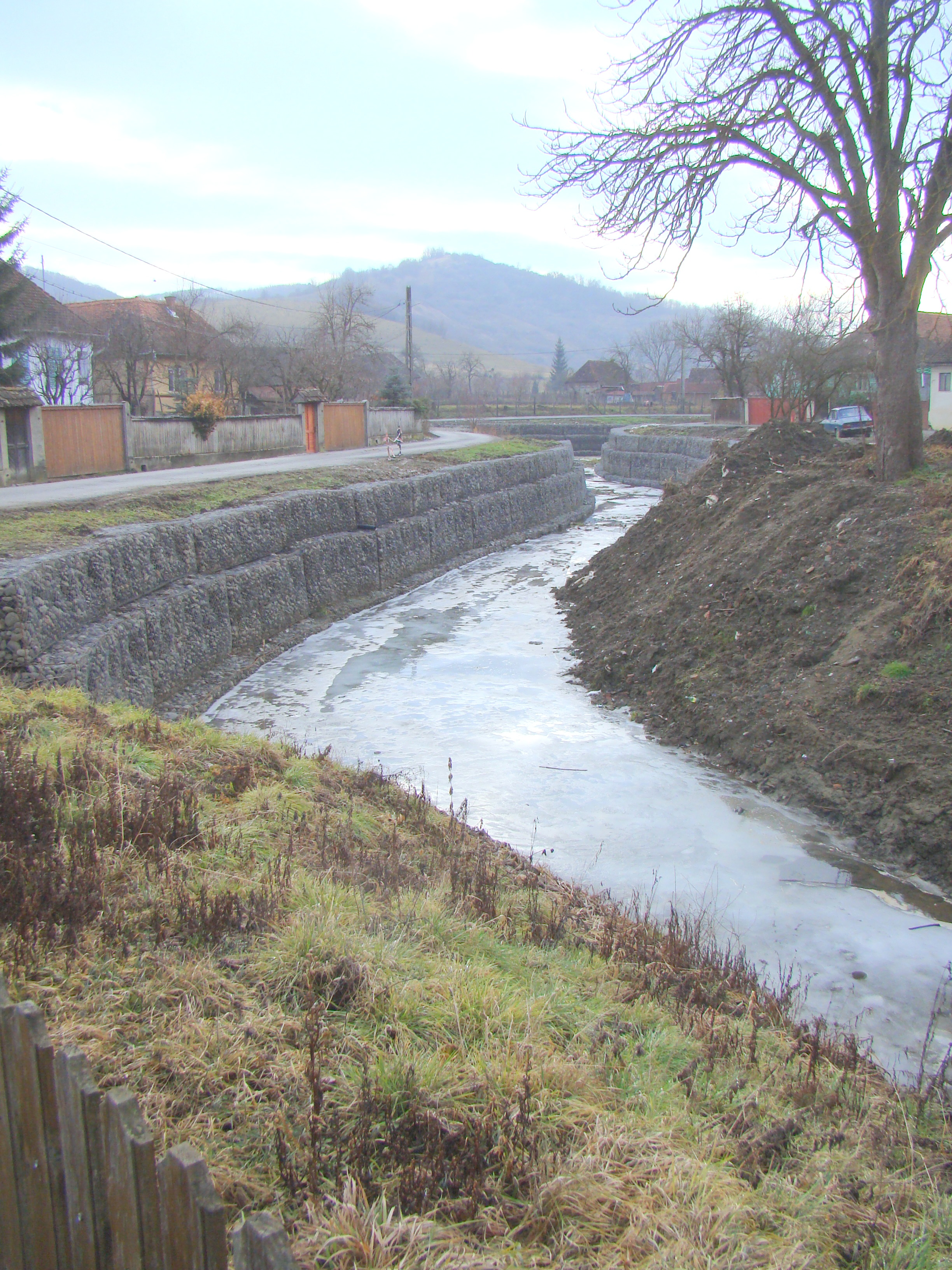

- Location within Romania

Location
- Country: Romania
- Counties: Mureș County
- Villages: Abud, Ghinești, Neaua, Vădaș, Viforoasa

Physical characteristics
- Mouth: Târnava Mică
  - location: Viforoasa
  - coordinates: 46.4284°N 24.8051°E
- Length: 18 km (11 mi)
- Basin size: 55 km^{2} (21 sq mi)

Basin features
- Progression: Târnava Mică→ Târnava→ Mureș→ Tisza→ Danube→ Black Sea
- Tributaries
  - right: Tarasveld

The Ghegheș is a right tributary of the river Târnava Mică in Romania. It discharges into the Târnava Mică in Viforoasa. Its length is 18 km (11 mi) and its basin size is 55 km^{2} (21 sq mi).
