= Chibed =

Chibed Kibéd
- Commune
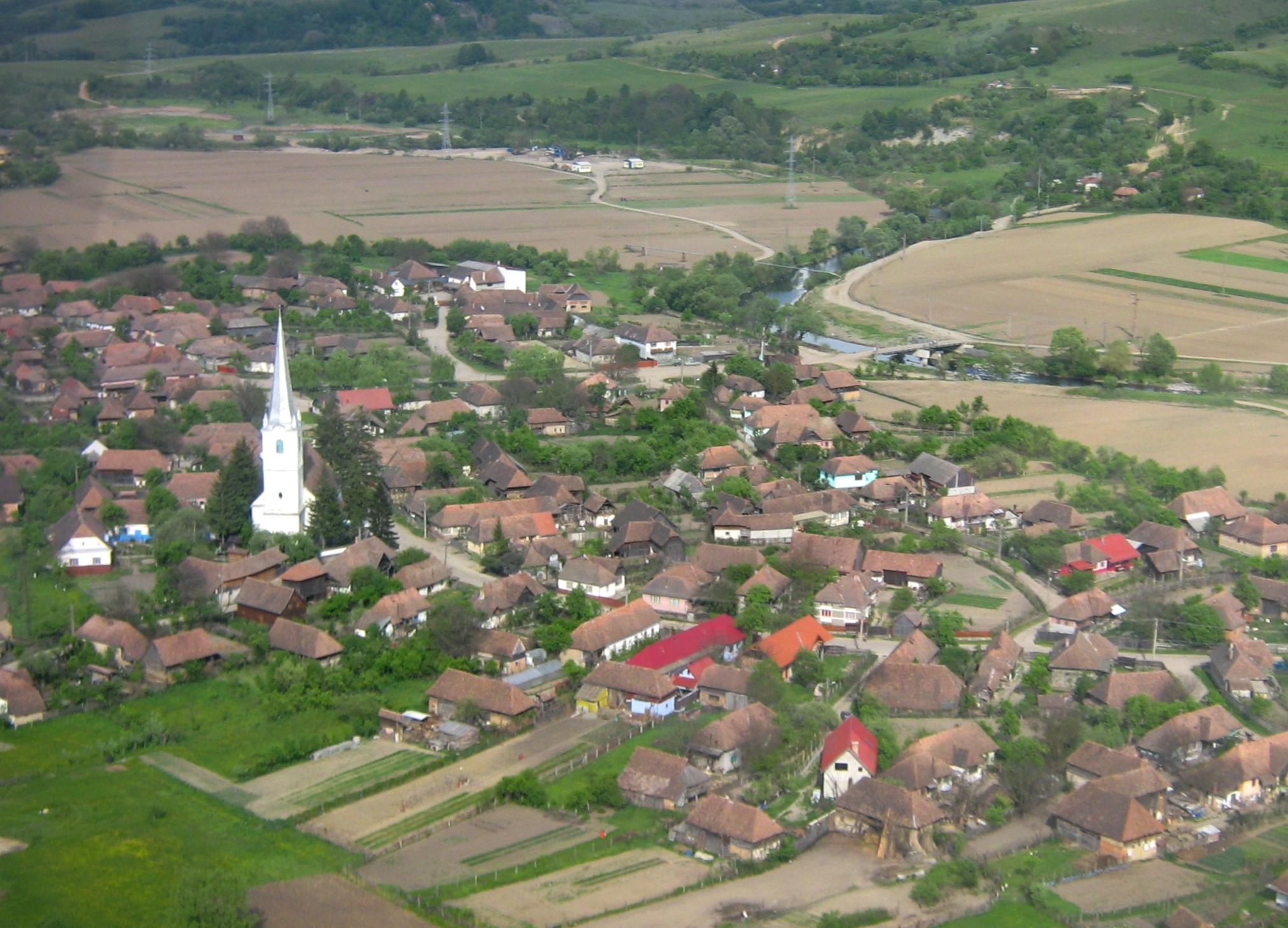

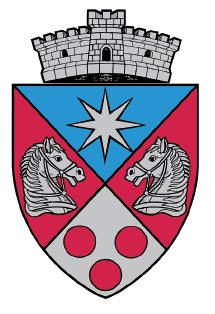
- Coat of arms

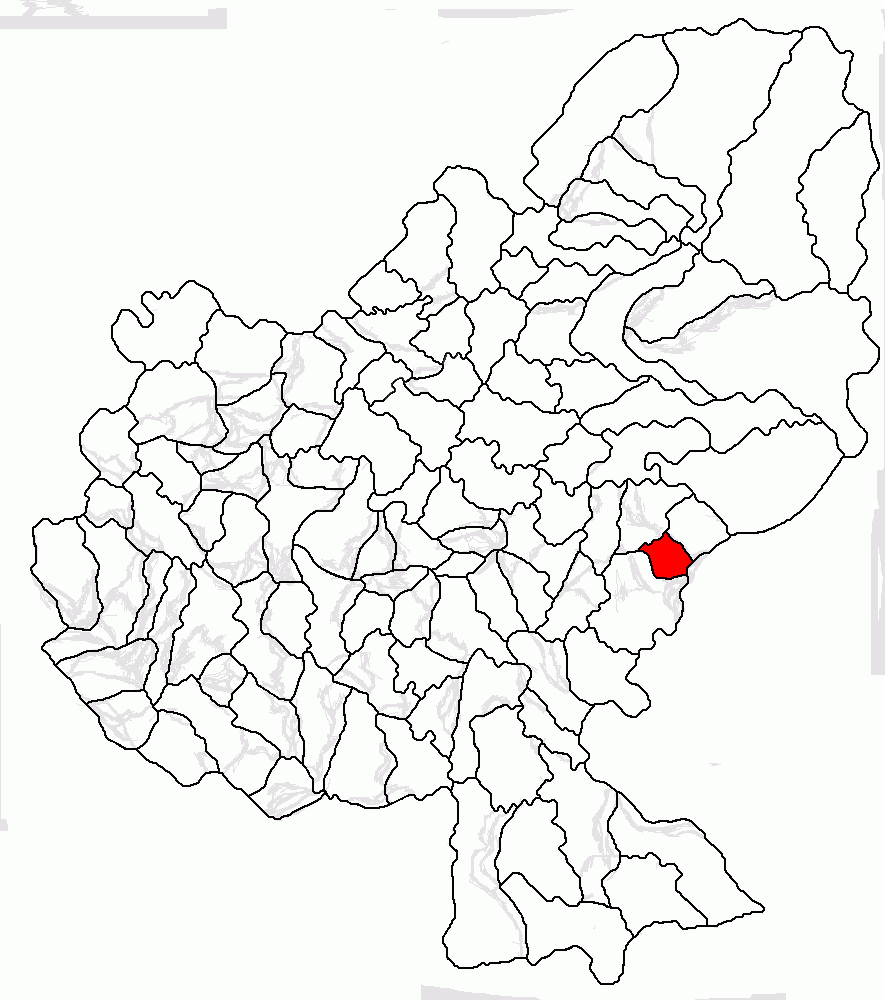
- Location in Mureș County

- Location in Romania
- Coordinates: 46°31′46″N 24°57′48″E
- Country: Romania
- County: Mureș

Government
  - Mayor (2020–2024): Sándor Dósa (UDMR)
- Area: 380 km^{2} (150 sq mi)
- Elevation: 384 m (1,260 ft)
- Population (2021-12-01): 1,730
  - Density: 4.6/km^{2} (12/sq mi)
- Time zone: UTC+02:00 (EET)
  - Summer (DST): UTC+03:00 (EEST)
- Postal code: 547268
- Area code: +(40) 265
- Vehicle reg.: MS
- Website: kibed.ro

Chibed (Hungarian: Kibéd, Hungarian pronunciation: [kibeːd]) is a commune in Mureș County, Transylvania, Romania, composed of a single village, Chibed. It lies in the Székely Land, an ethno-cultural region in eastern Transylvania. The village is famous for the onion produced in the village and sold in front of the houses along the main road.

== History ==
The village was historically part of the Székely Land in Transylvania and belonged to Marosszék in the Middle Ages. In the mid-1780s as part of the Josephine administrative reform, Marosszék was integrated into Küküllő County, however, the szék-system was restored in 1790. After the suppression of the Hungarian Revolution in 1849, the village formed part of the Kibéd military sub-division of the Marosvásárhely division in the Udvarhely military district. Between 1861 and 1876, the former Marosszék was restored. As a result of the administrative reform in 1876, the village fell within Maros-Torda County in the Kingdom of Hungary.

In the immediate aftermath of World War I, following the declaration of the Union of Transylvania with Romania, the area passed under Romanian administration during the Hungarian–Romanian War of 1918–1919. By the terms of the Treaty of Trianon of 1920, Chibed became part of the Kingdom of Romania. During the interwar period, the village fell within Plasa Sângeorgiu de Pădure of Odorhei County. In 1940, the Second Vienna Award granted Northern Transylvania to Hungary and the territory was held by Hungary until October 1944, when it was taken back from Hungarian and German troops by Romanian and Soviet forces, and came under Romanian administration in March 1945.

In 1950, after Communist Romania was established, Chibed became part of the Odorhei Raion of Stalin Region. Between 1952 and 1960, the commune fell within the Magyar Autonomous Region, and between 1960 and 1968 the Mureș-Magyar Autonomous Region. In 1968, the region was abolished, and since then, the commune has been part of Mureș County, first as a component village of Ghindari and, since splitting away in 2003, as an independent commune.

== Demography ==
Historical population
Year	Pop.	±%
1850	1,873	—
1880	2,003	+6.9%
1900	2,579	+28.8%
1910	2,633	+2.1%
1930	2,558	−2.8%
1956	2,681	+4.8%
1977	2,046	−23.7%
1992	1,854	−9.4%
2002	1,785	−3.7%
2007	1,721	−3.6%
2011	1,765	+2.6%
2021	1,730	−2.0%
Source: Census data

According to the 2011 census, the commune has a population of 1,765 of which 1,693 or 95.92% were Székely Hungarians. At the 2021 census, Chibed has a population of 1,730, of those, 95.26% were Hungarians.

In 1910, the village had 2,633 Hungarian inhabitants, which made up 100% of the population. In 1930, the census indicated 2,443 Hungarians (95.50%), 108 Gypsies (4.22%), and 6 Romanians (0.23%). In 2002, beside 1,780 Hungarians (99.72%), the village also had 5 Romanian (0.28%) inhabitants. At this time, 814 households were registered along with 802 residential buildings. In 2007, the village had 1,721 inhabitants.

== Twinnings ==
The village is twinned with:

- Bakonyszombathely, Hungary
- Szatymaz, Hungary
- Zalalövő, Hungary

== See also ==
- List of Hungarian exonyms (Mureș County)

== Gallery ==
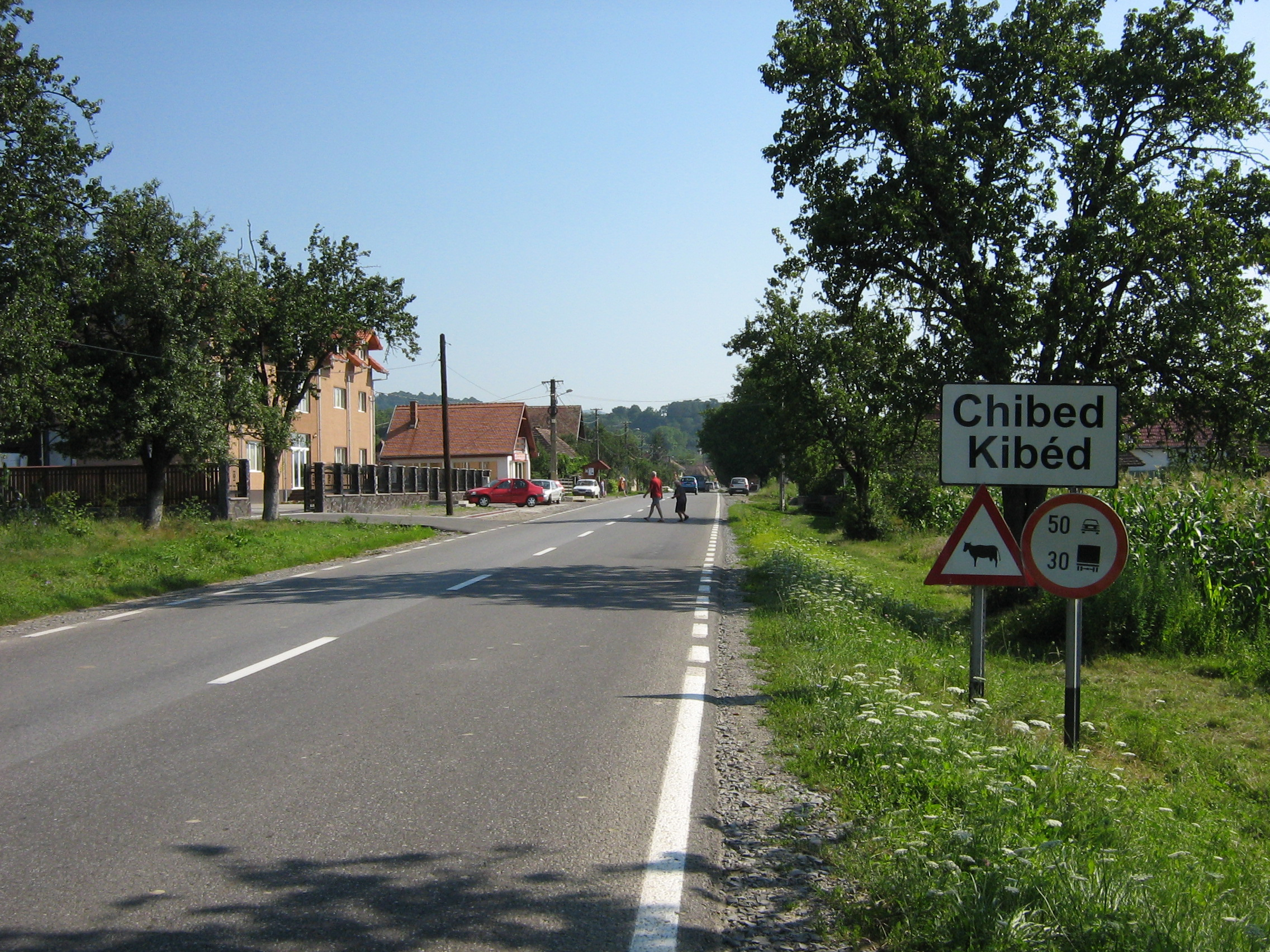
Bilingual signboard

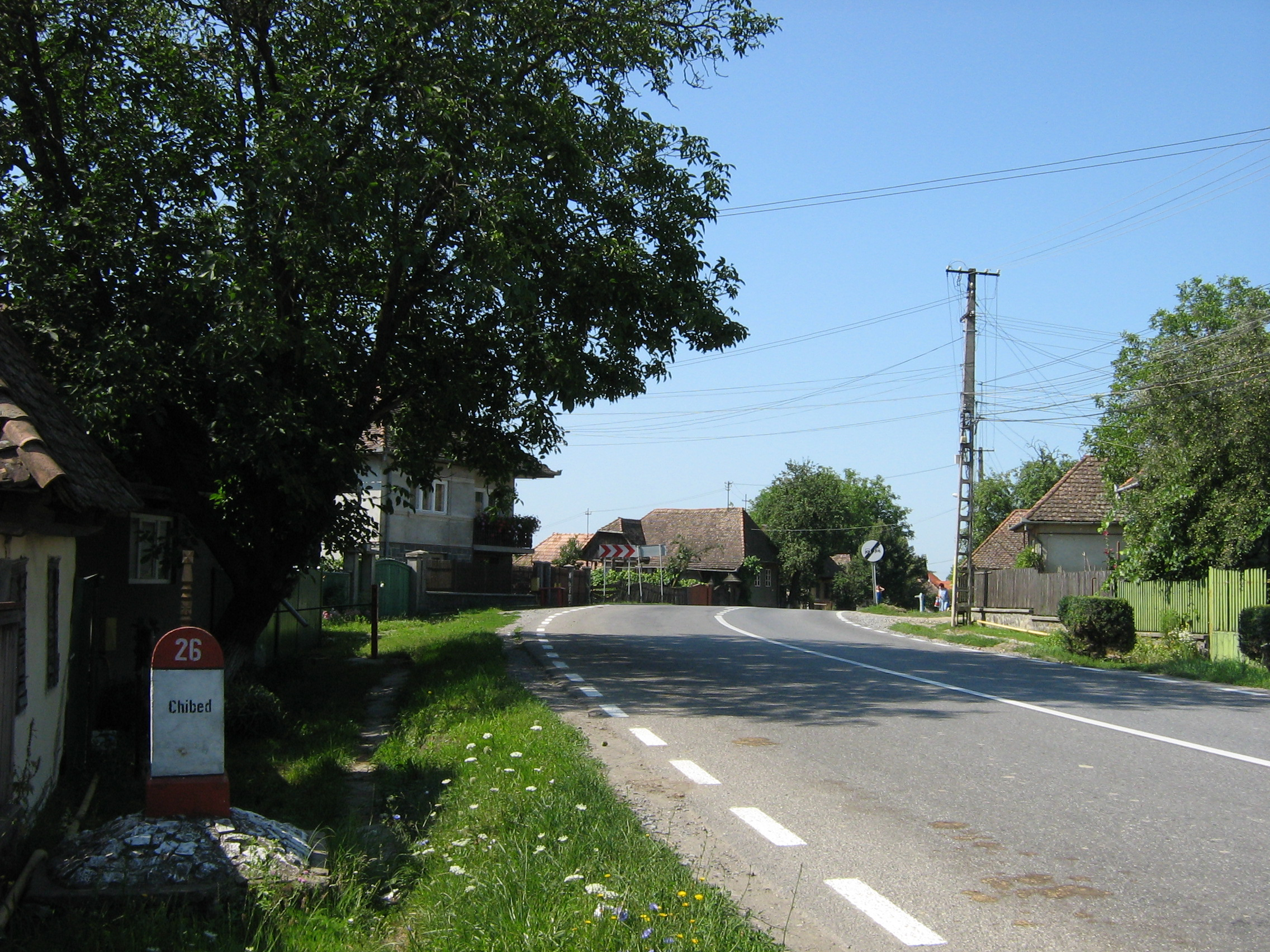
Main Road

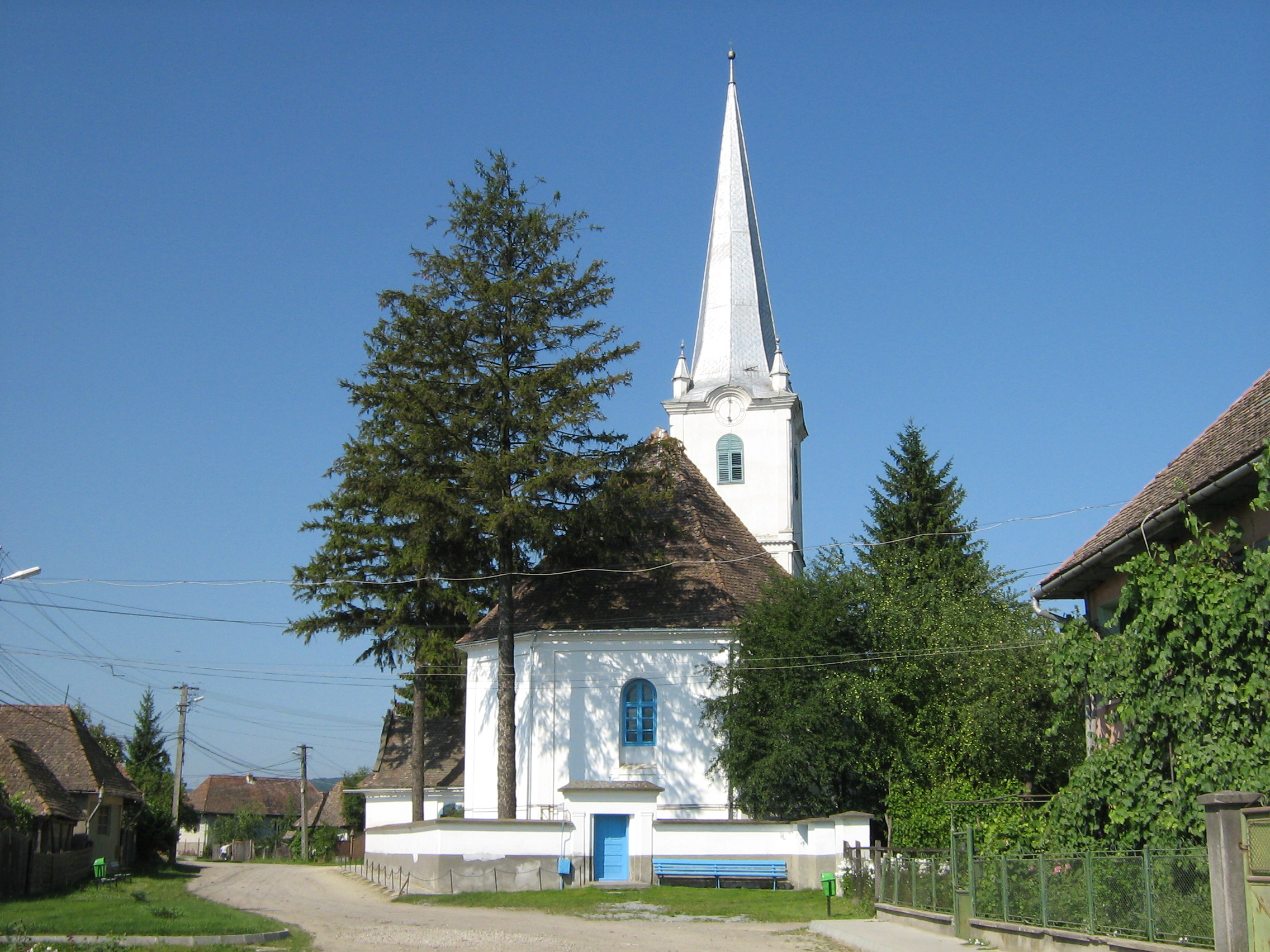
Reformed church

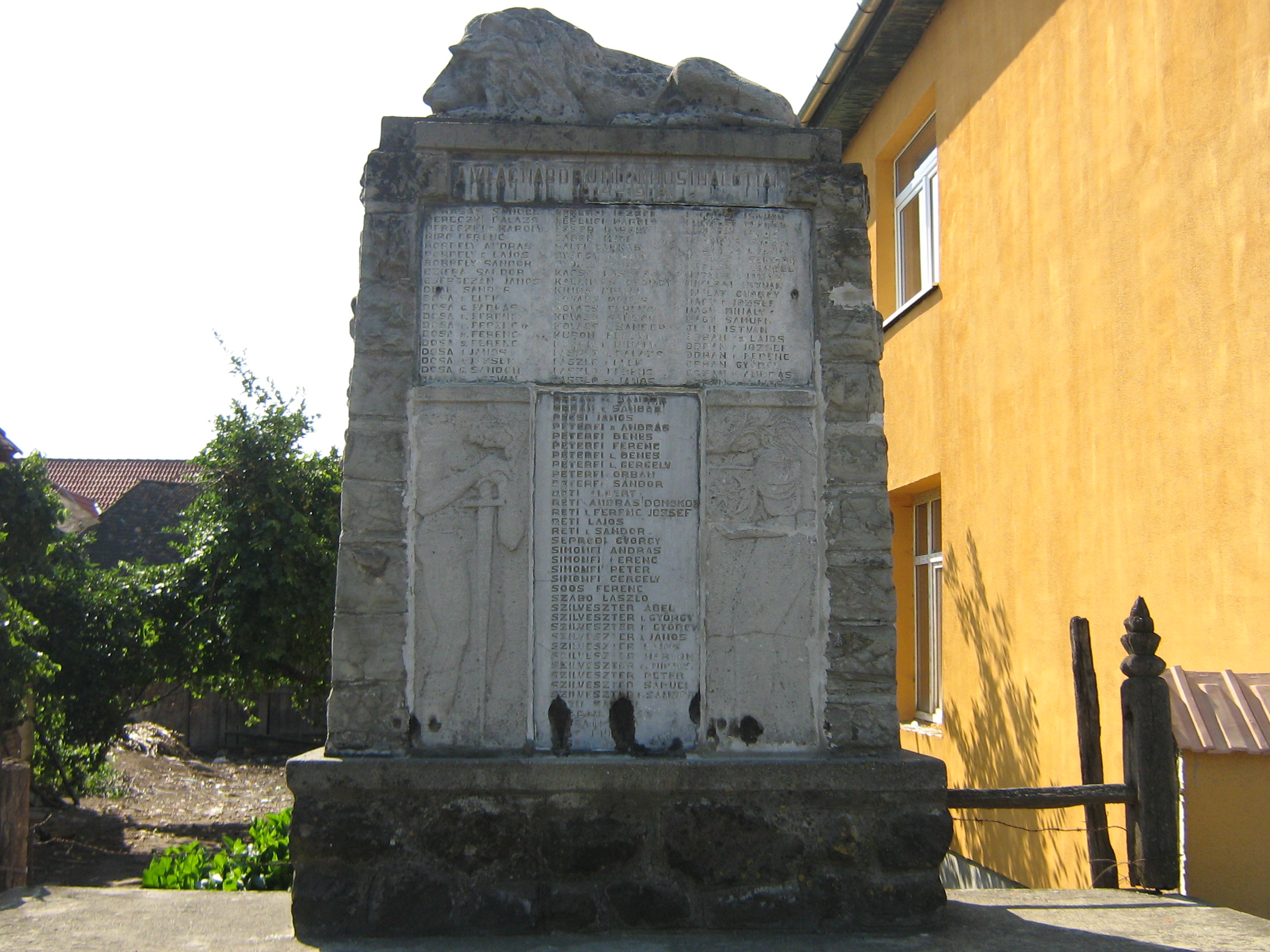
Heroes Memorial
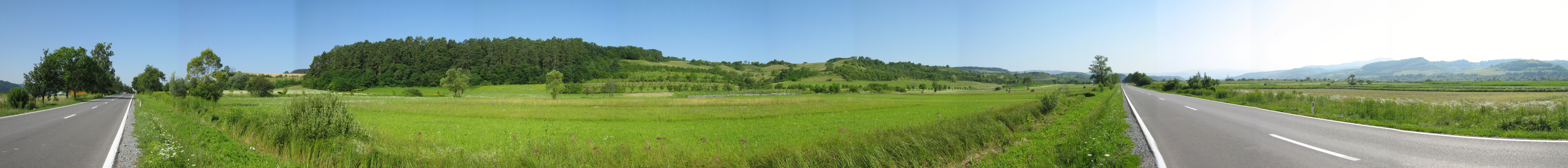
The valley of the Târnava Mică river at Chibed
