= Iuhod =

- Location within Romania

Location
- Country: Romania
- Counties: Harghita, Mureș

Physical characteristics
- Mouth: Târnava Mică
  - location: Sovata
  - coordinates: 46.5716°N 25.0680°E
- Length: 17 km (11 mi)
- Basin size: 75 km^{2} (29 sq mi)

Basin features
- Progression: Târnava Mică→ Târnava→ Mureș→ Tisza→ Danube→ Black Sea

The Iuhod is a right tributary of the river Târnava Mică in Romania. It discharges into the Târnava Mică near Sovata. Its length is 17 km (11 mi) and its basin size is 75 km^{2} (29 sq mi).
