= Corund (river) =

- Location within Romania

Location
- Country: Romania
- Counties: Harghita
- Villages: Corund, Praid

Physical characteristics
- Mouth: Târnava Mică
  - location: Praid
  - coordinates: 46.5513°N 25.1031°E
- Length: 23 km (14 mi)
- Basin size: 136 km^{2} (53 sq mi)

Basin features
- Progression: Târnava Mică→ Târnava→ Mureș→ Tisza→ Danube→ Black Sea

The Corund is a left tributary of the river Târnava Mică in Romania. It discharges into the Târnava Mică in Praid. Its length is 23 km (14 mi) and its basin size is 136 km^{2} (53 sq mi).
