= Creanga Mare =

Creanga Mare Craca Mare
- Location within Romania

Location
- Country: Romania
- Counties: Harghita County

Physical characteristics
- Mouth: Târnava Mică
  - coordinates: 46.5731°N 25.2159°E
- Length: 12 km (7.5 mi)
- Basin size: 34 km^{2} (13 sq mi)

Basin features
- Progression: Târnava Mică→ Târnava→ Mureș→ Tisza→ Danube→ Black Sea

The Creanga Mare (also: Craca Mare) is a right tributary of the river Târnava Mică in Romania. It flows into the Târnava Mică in Bucin. Its length is 12 km (7.5 mi) and its basin size is 34 km^{2} (13 sq mi).
