= Pănade =

- Location within Romania

Location
- Country: Romania
- Counties: Alba County

Physical characteristics
- Mouth: Târnava Mică
  - location: Pănade
  - coordinates: 46.2233°N 23.9636°E
- Length: 14 km (8.7 mi)
- Basin size: 65 km^{2} (25 sq mi)

Basin features
- Progression: Târnava Mică→ Târnava→ Mureș→ Tisza→ Danube→ Black Sea
- Tributaries
  - right: Ocnișoara, Valea Spinului, Valea Valezărului

The Pănade is a right tributary of the river Târnava Mică in Romania. It discharges into the Târnava Mică in the village Pănade. Its length is 14 km (8.7 mi) and its basin size is 65 km^{2} (25 sq mi).
