= Enric Martín =

Spanish paralympic track guide

Personal information
- Full name: Enric Ismael Martín Panades
- Nationality: Spanish
- Born: 18 August 1980 (age 45)

Sport
- Country: Spain
- Sport: Track and field

Enric Ismael Martín Panades (born 18 August 1980) is a Spanish track and field athlete and sighted guide.

== Personal ==
Martín was born on 18 August 1980 outside of Spain. He is from the Catalan region of Spain. In 2012, he lived in Barcelona.

== Athletics ==
At the 2006 Spanish indoor national championships, Martín finished third in the 200 meters with a time of 21.84.

From the Catalan region of Spain, Martín was a recipient a Plan ADO scholarship. Spain's 14 strong visually impaired athletics delegation to the London Games participated in a training camp at the Center for Sports Modernization in La Rioja ahead of the Games. Martín competed at the 2012 Summer Paralympics as a guide for Xavier Porras. Together, they competed in the 4 × 100 meters event, finishing fourth. They also competed in the 100 meter event. In July 2013, he was Porras guide at the IPC Athletics World Championships.
