= Atid =

Commune in Harghita, Transylvania, Romania

Atid Etéd
- Commune
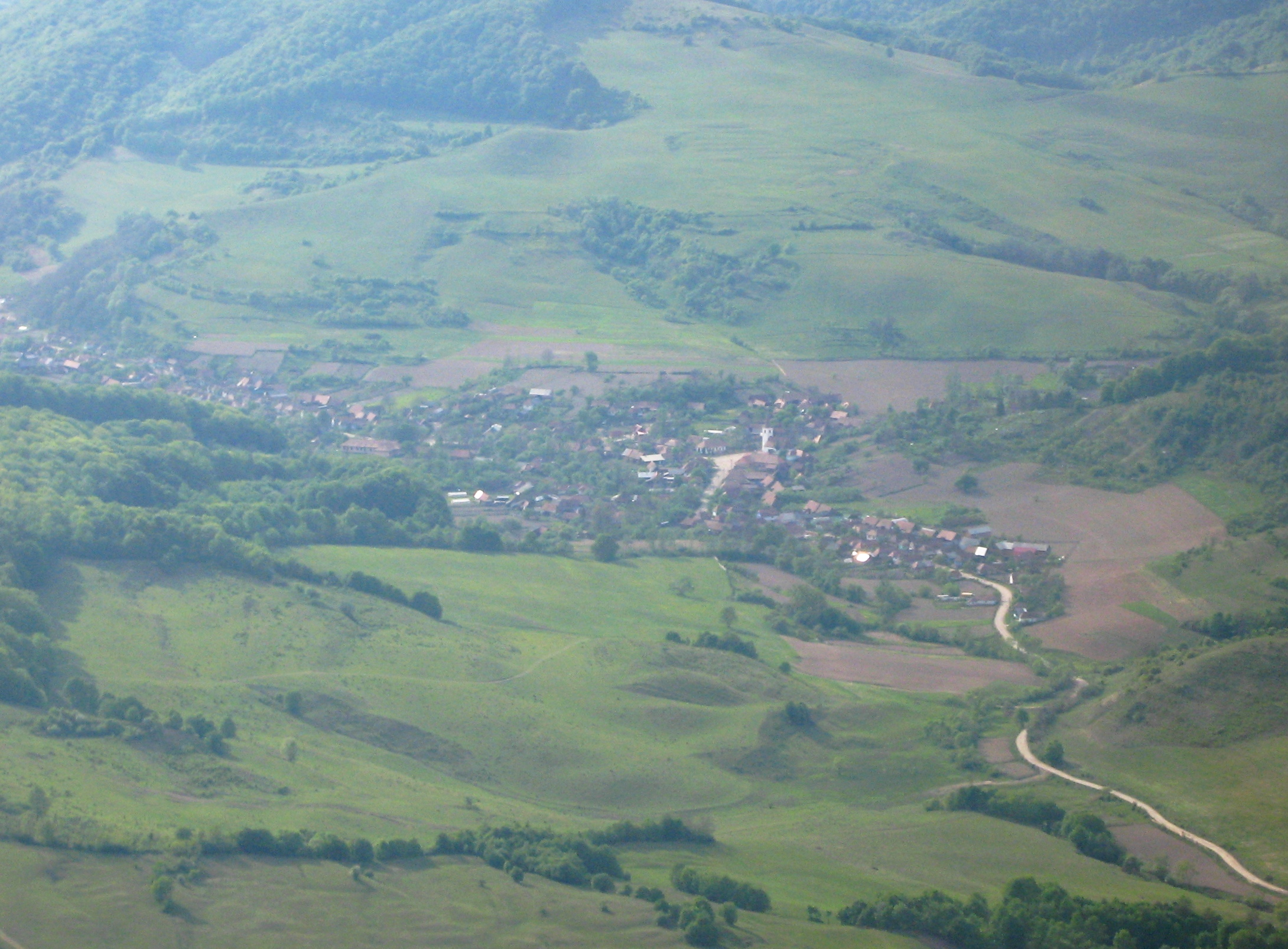

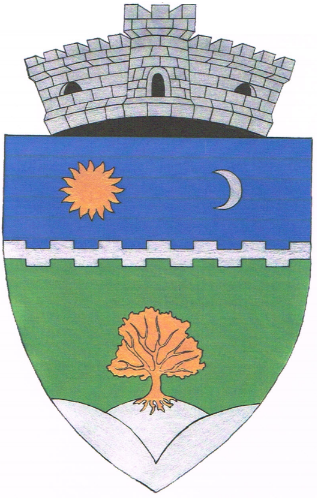
- Coat of arms

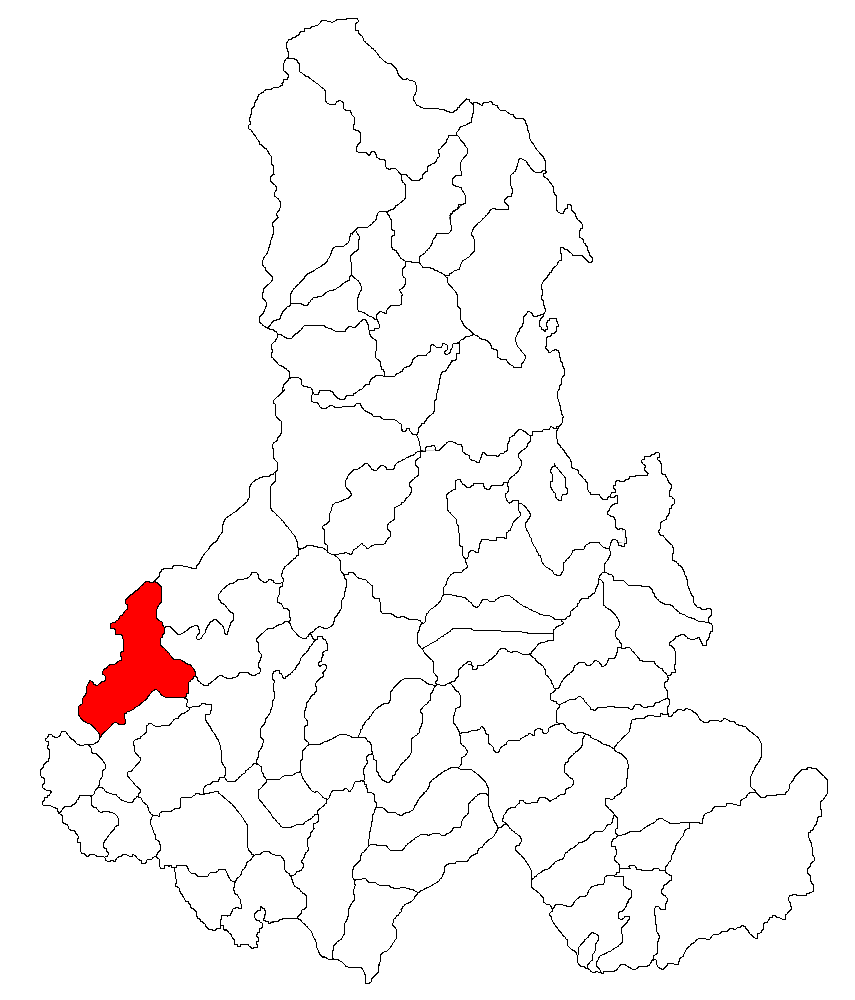
- Location in Harghita County

- Location in Romania
- Coordinates: 46°27′0″N 25°3′0″E
- Country: Romania
- County: Harghita

Government
  - Mayor (2024–2028): Pál Lőrinczi (Ind.)
- Area: 140.28 km^{2} (54.16 sq mi)
- Elevation: 452 m (1,483 ft)
- Population (2021-12-01): 2,594
  - Density: 18.49/km^{2} (47.89/sq mi)
- Time zone: UTC+02:00 (EET)
  - Summer (DST): UTC+03:00 (EEST)
- Postal code: 537005
- Area code: +(40) 266
- Vehicle reg.: HR
- Website: www.atid.ro

Atid (Hungarian: Etéd, pronounced [ˈɛteːd]) is a commune in Harghita County, Romania. It lies in the Székely Land, an ethno-cultural region in eastern Transylvania. The route of the Via Transilvanica long-distance trail passes through the village of Inlăceni, which is administered by Atid commune.

== Component villages ==
The commune is composed of five villages:

In Romanian	In Hungarian
Atid	Etéd
Crișeni	Kőrispatak
Cușmed	Küsmöd
Inlăceni	Énlaka
Șiclod	Siklód

== History ==
From ancient times the area was populated by Dacians. After the Roman conquest of Dacia, the Romans imposed their control in the area by constructing a fort known as Praetoria Augusta in Inlăceni village. The fort was discovered in 1858.

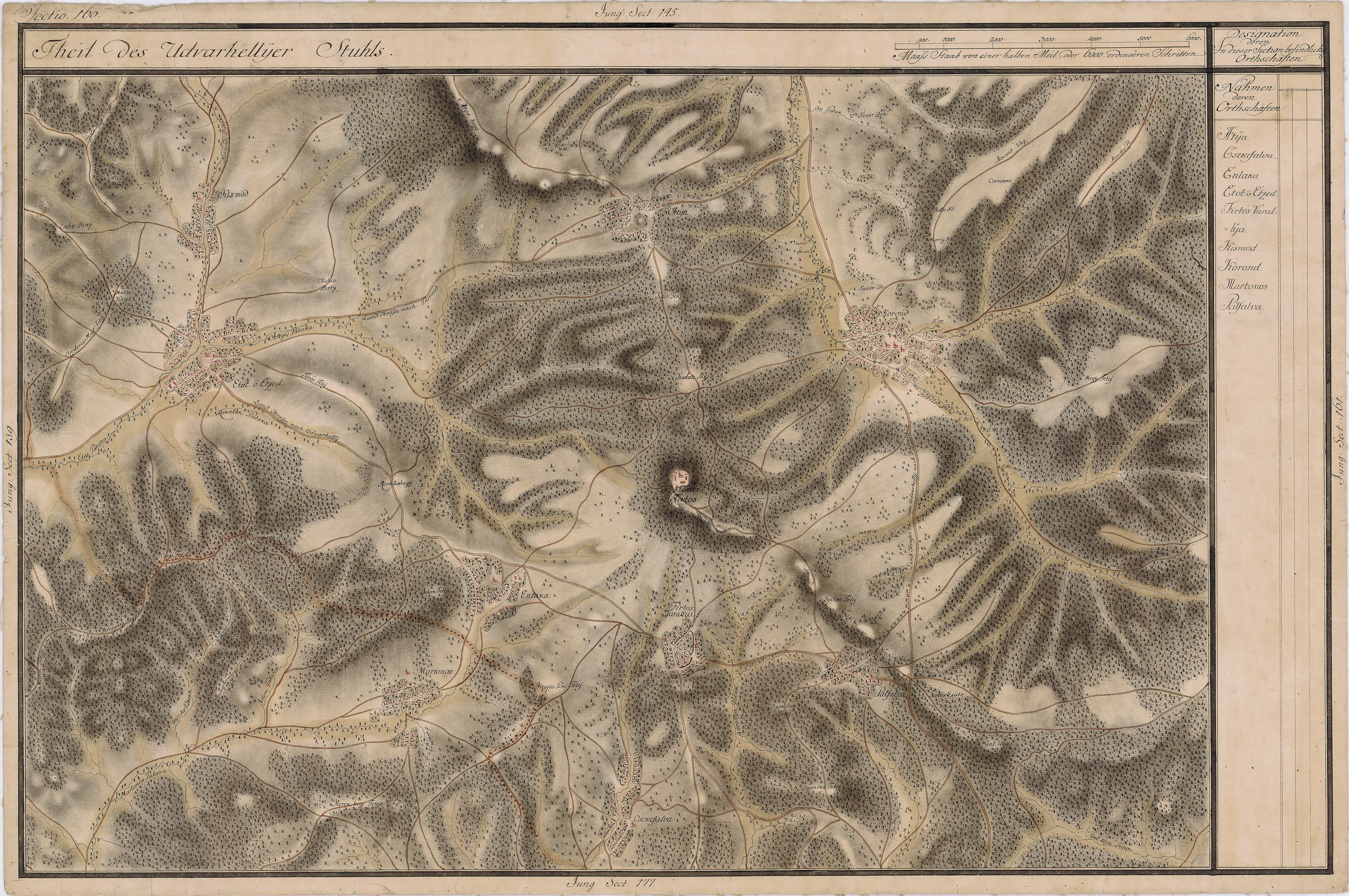
18th century map

The villages were historically part of the Székely Land region of Transylvania province. They belonged to Udvarhely district until the administrative reform of Transylvania in 1876, when they fell within Udvarhely County in the Kingdom of Hungary. In the aftermath of World War I, the Union of Transylvania with Romania was declared in December 1918. At the start of the Hungarian–Romanian War of 1918–1919, the town passed under Romanian administration. After the Treaty of Trianon of 1920, it became part of the Kingdom of Romania and fell within Odorhei County during the interwar period. In 1940, the second Vienna Award granted Northern Transylvania to Hungary, which held it until 1944. After Soviet occupation, the Romanian administration returned, and the commune became officially part of Romania in 1947. Between 1952 and 1960, the commune was part of the Magyar Autonomous Region, between 1960 and 1968 the Mureș-Magyar Autonomous Region. In 1968, the province was abolished, and since then, the commune has been part of Harghita County.

The Reformed church was built in 1802, on the site of a 17th-century church destroyed in the great fire of 8 September 1792. The Roman Catholic parish church was built in 1876 in honor of St. Michael. Its tower was completed in 1889. The village used to be famous for its weekly fairs.

== Demographics ==
Historical population
Year	Pop.	±%
1850	5,203	—
1941	5,828	+12.0%
2002	2,834	−51.4%
2011	2,705	−4.6%
2021	2,594	−4.1%
Source: Census data

The commune has an absolute Székely Hungarian majority. According to the 2002 census it had a population of 2,837, of which 98.37% or 2,791 were Hungarians. At the 2021 census, Atid had 2,594 inhabitants; of those, 88.13% were Hungarians and 1.31% Roma.

== Villages ==
=== Atid ===
Atid (Hungarian: Etéd) had 1228 inhabitants at the 2011.

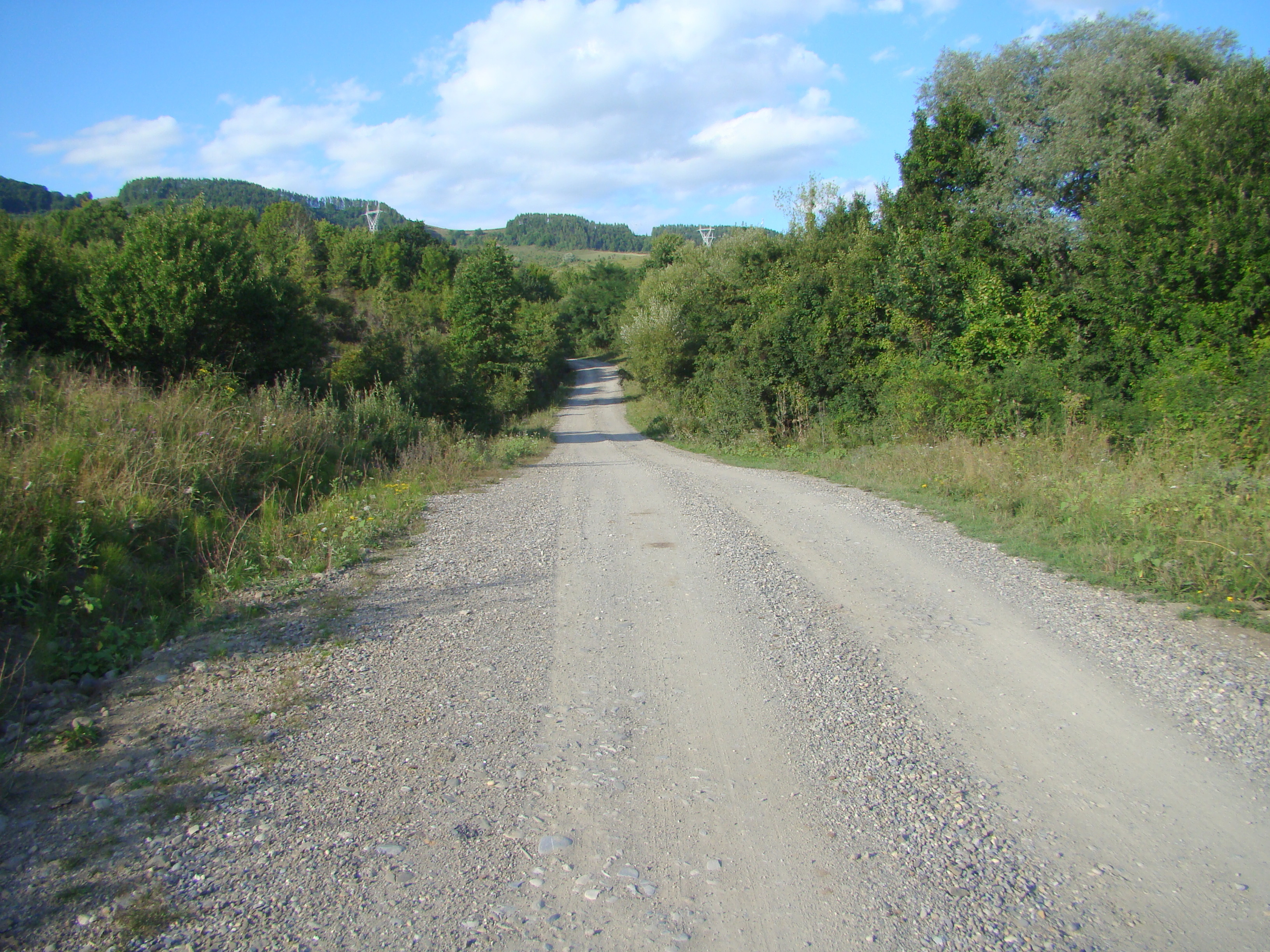
Road Atia-Atid

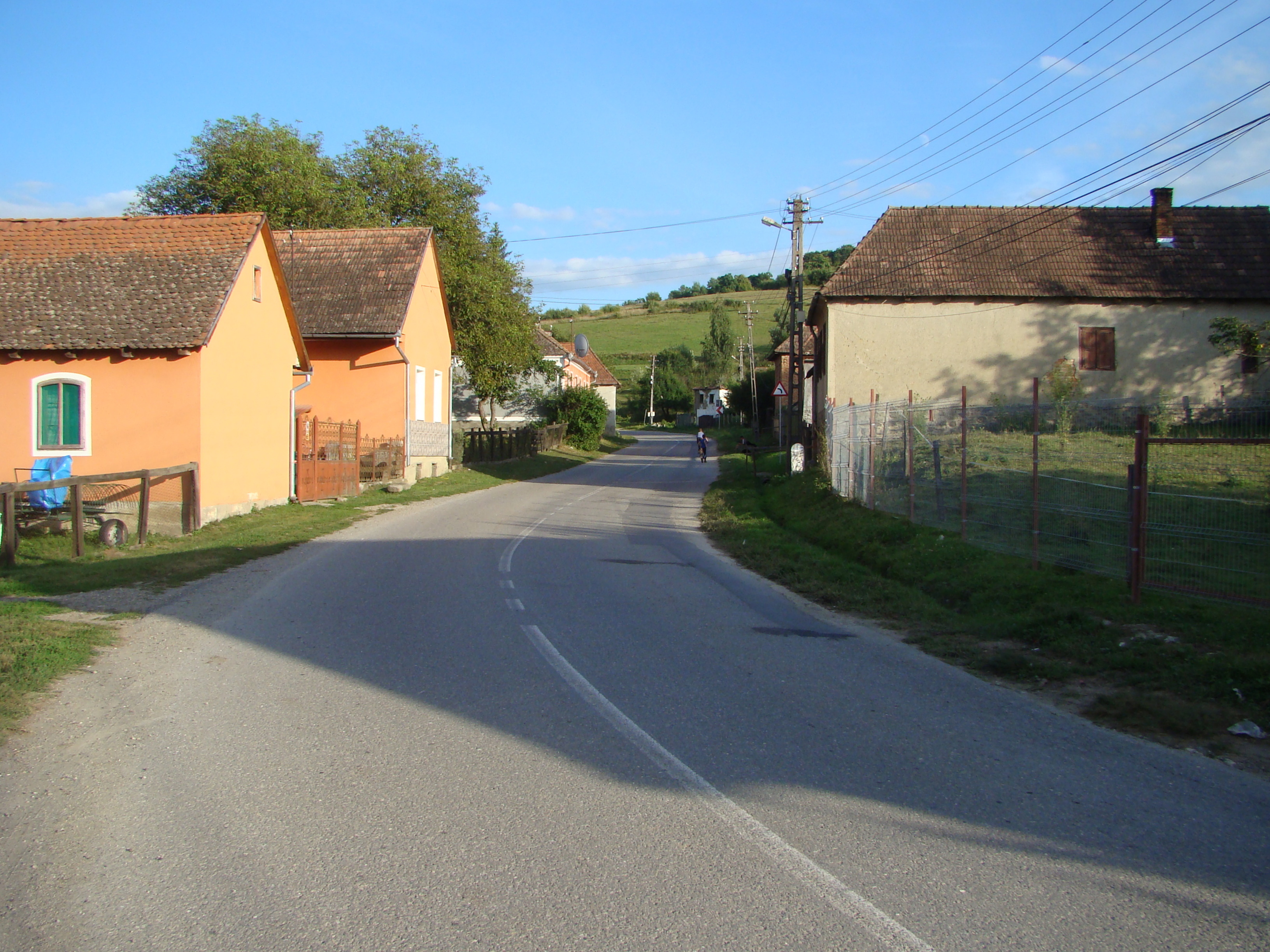
Street in Atid

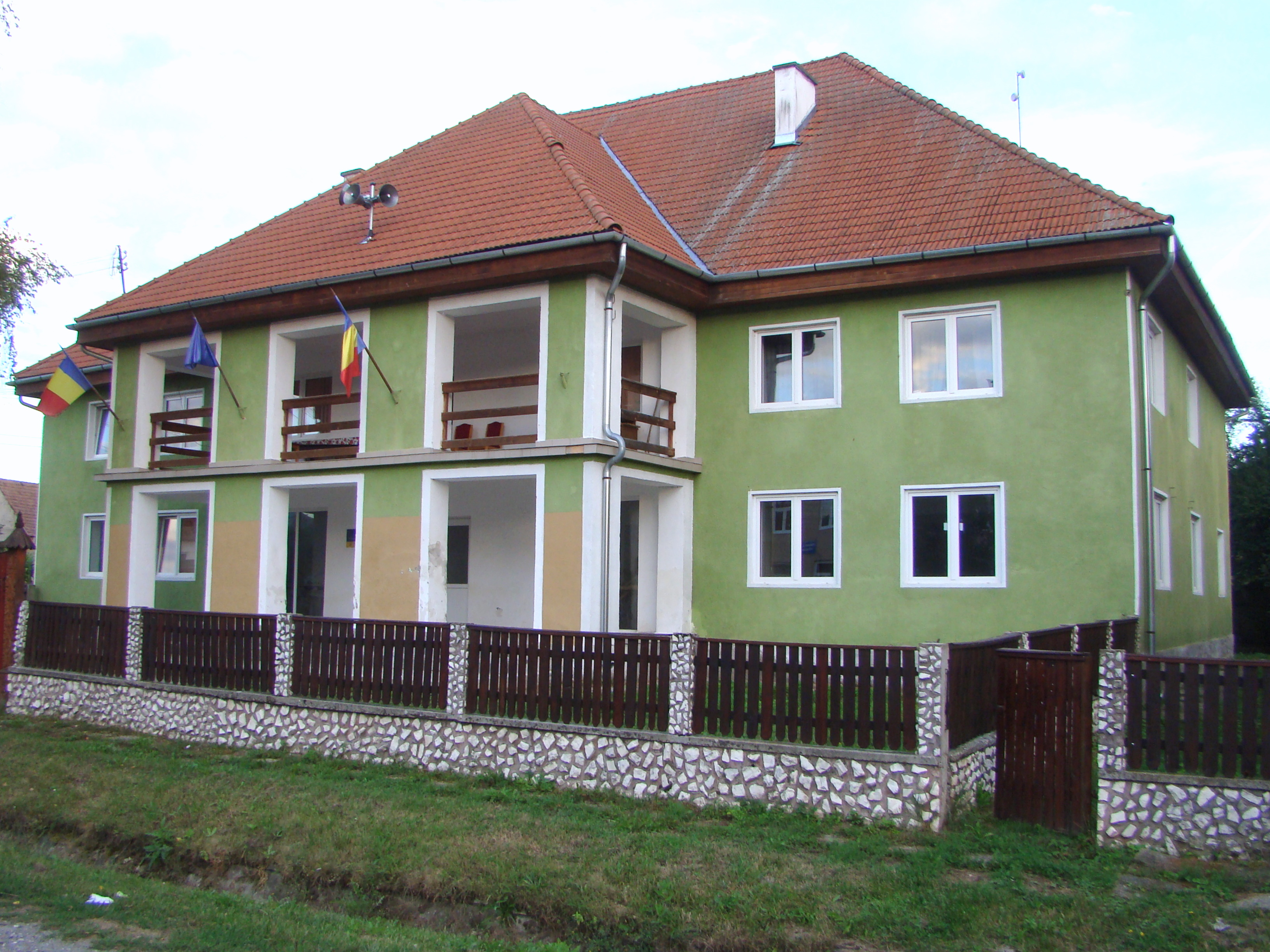
Townhall

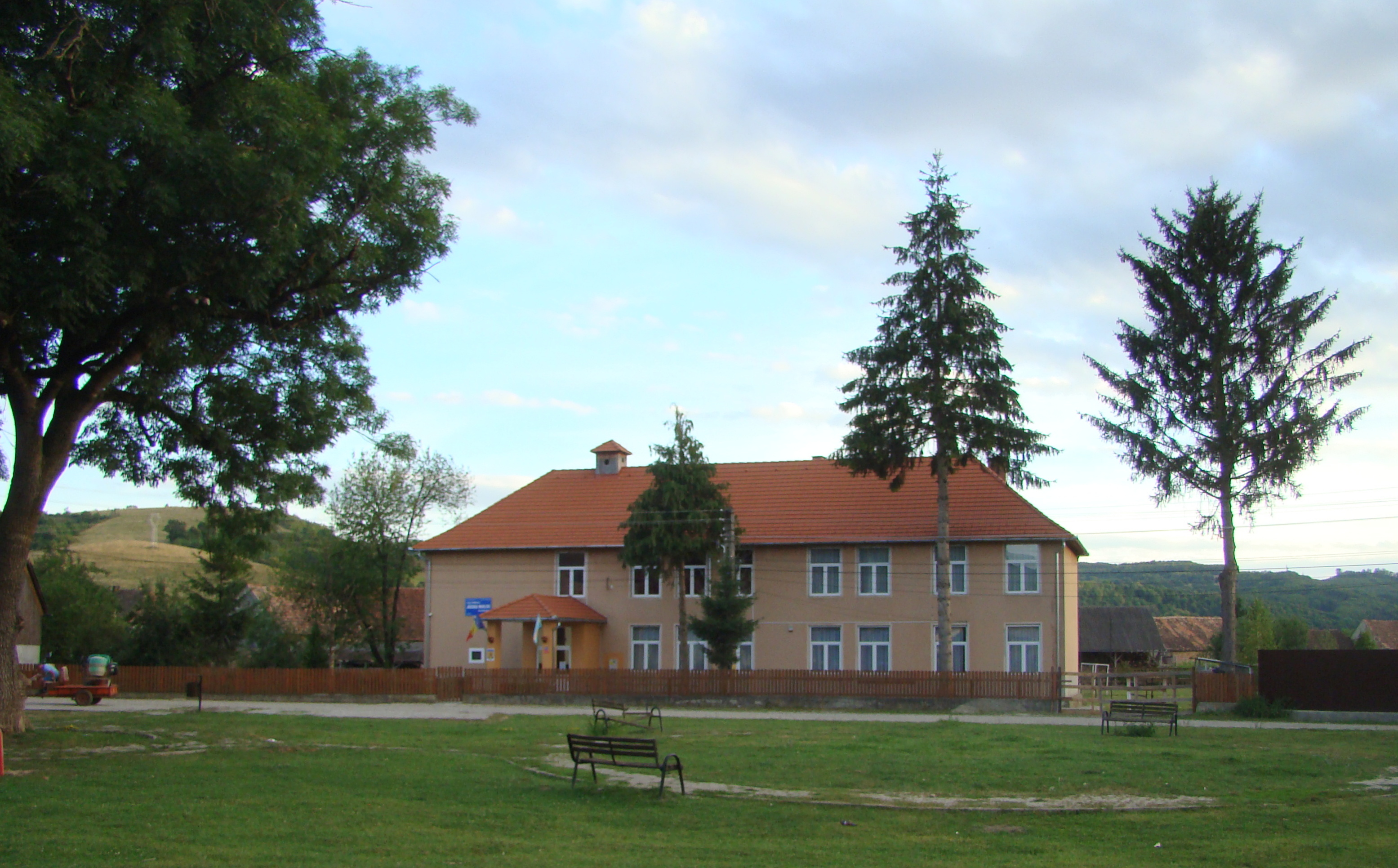
School

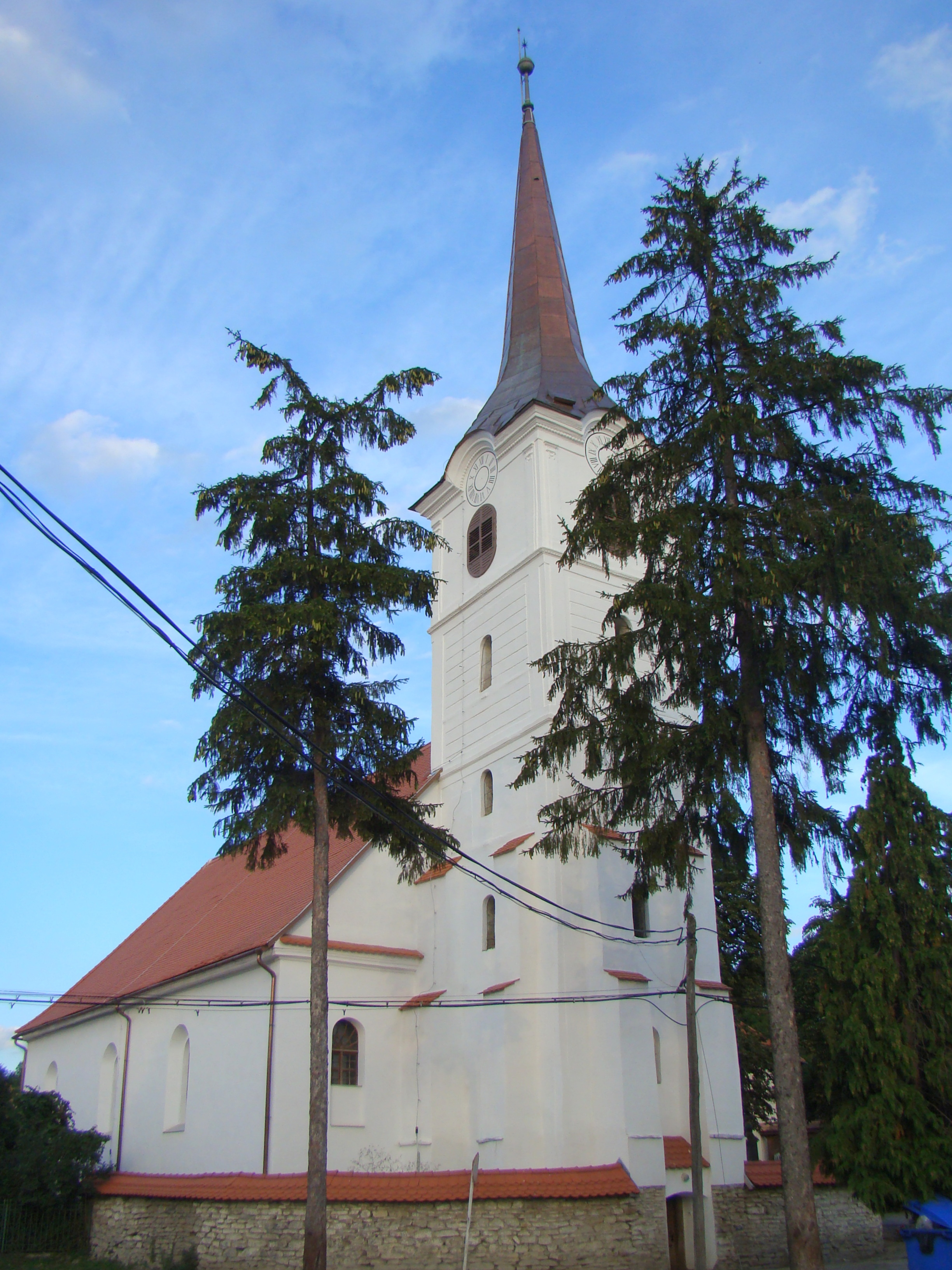
Reformed church

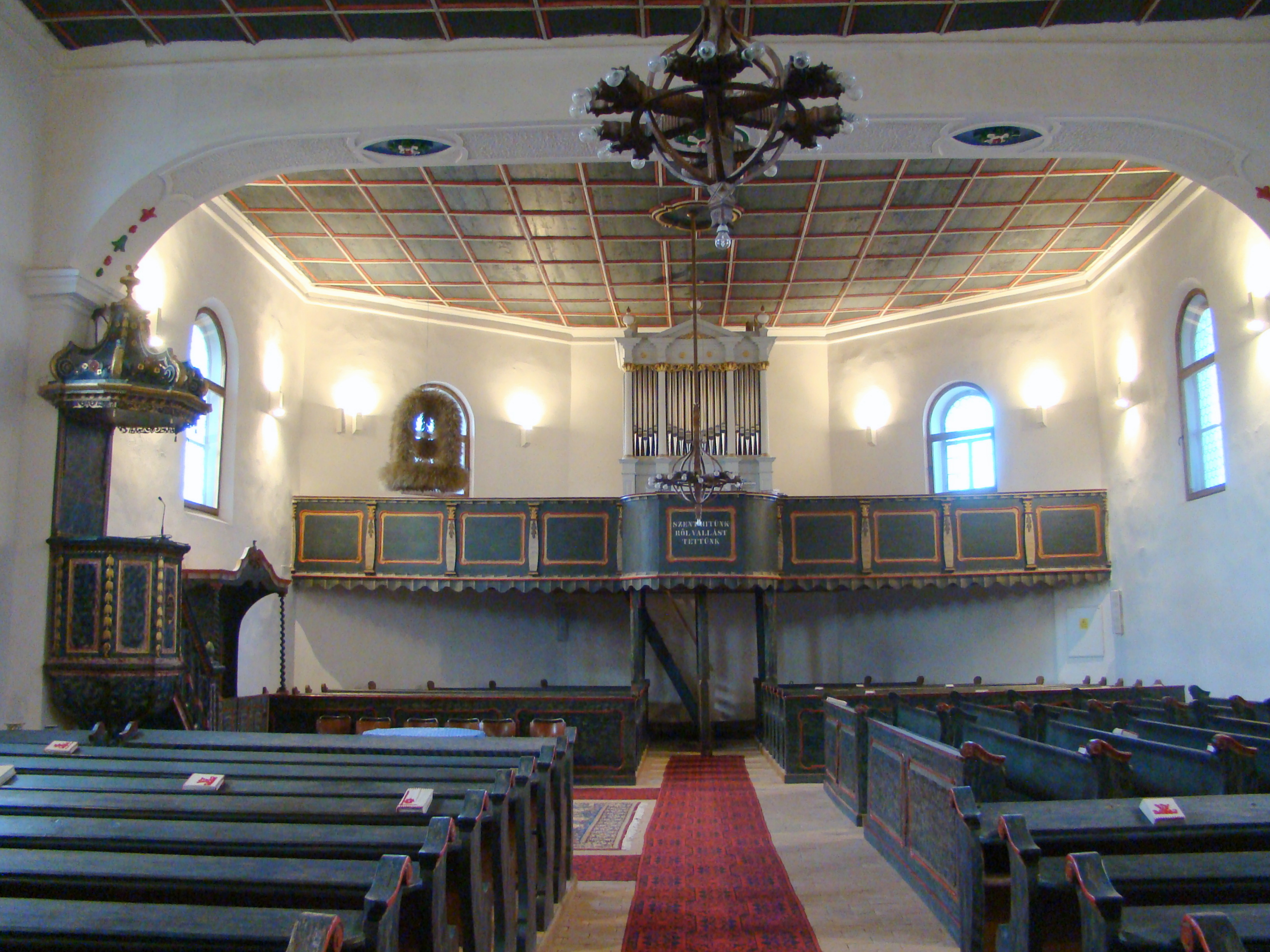
Reformed church interior

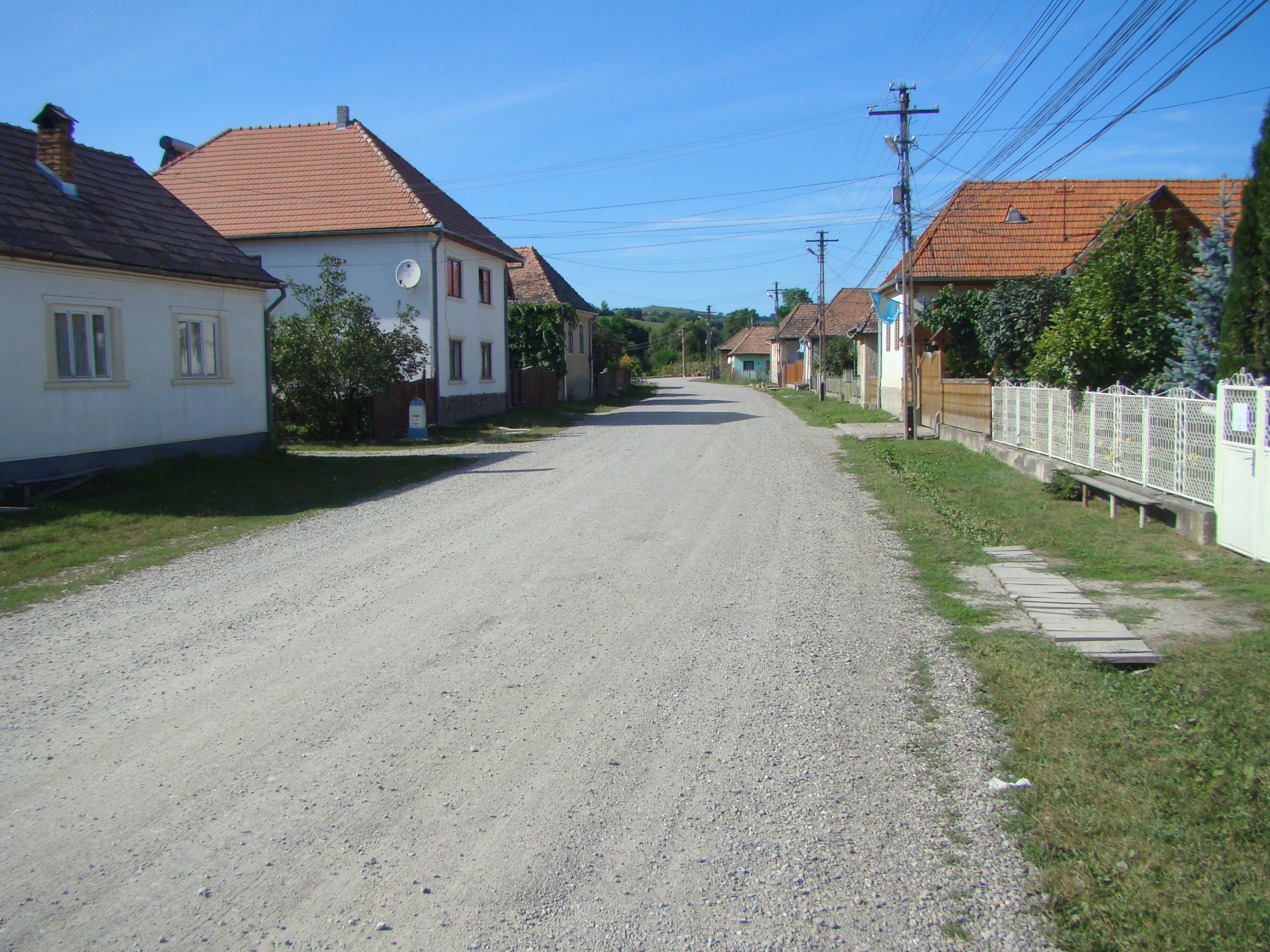
Street in Atid

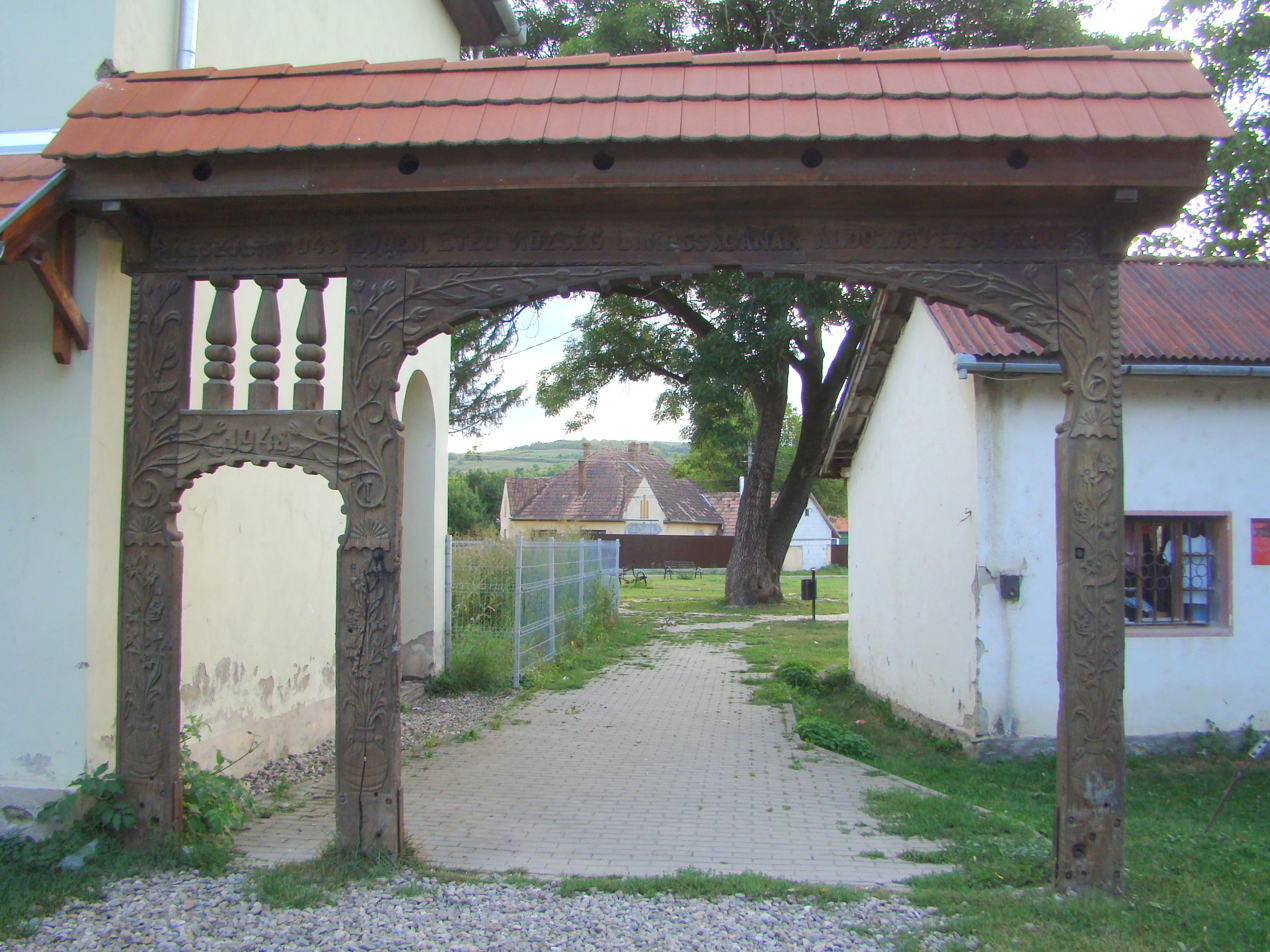
Székely gate

=== Inlăceni ===
Inlăceni (Hungarian: Énlaka, Hungarian pronunciation: [ˈeːnlɒkɒ]) had 228 inhabitants in 1992, all of them Székely Hungarians. As in the village's vicinity, most inhabitants belong to the Unitarian Church of Transylvania.

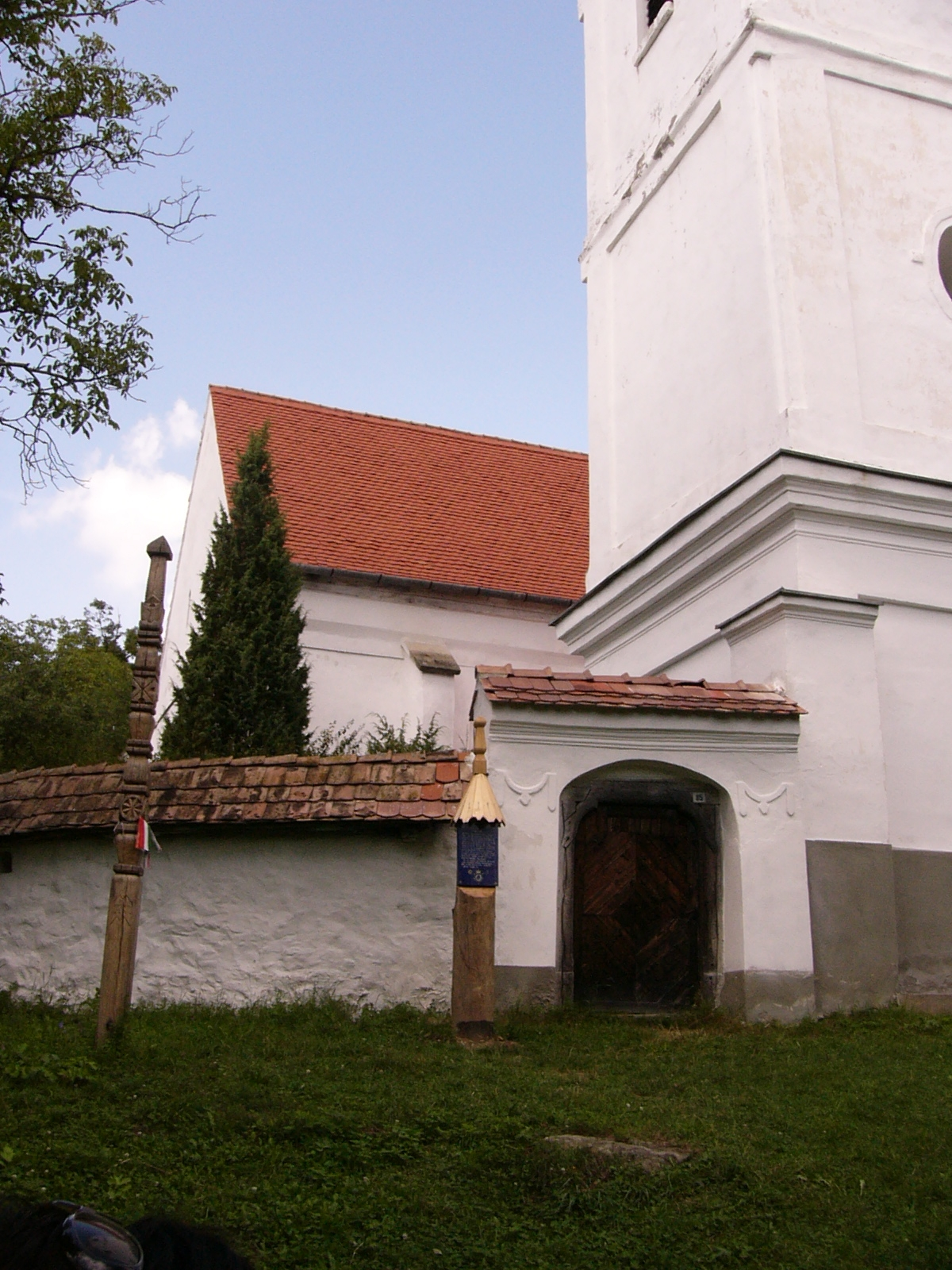
Unitarian church

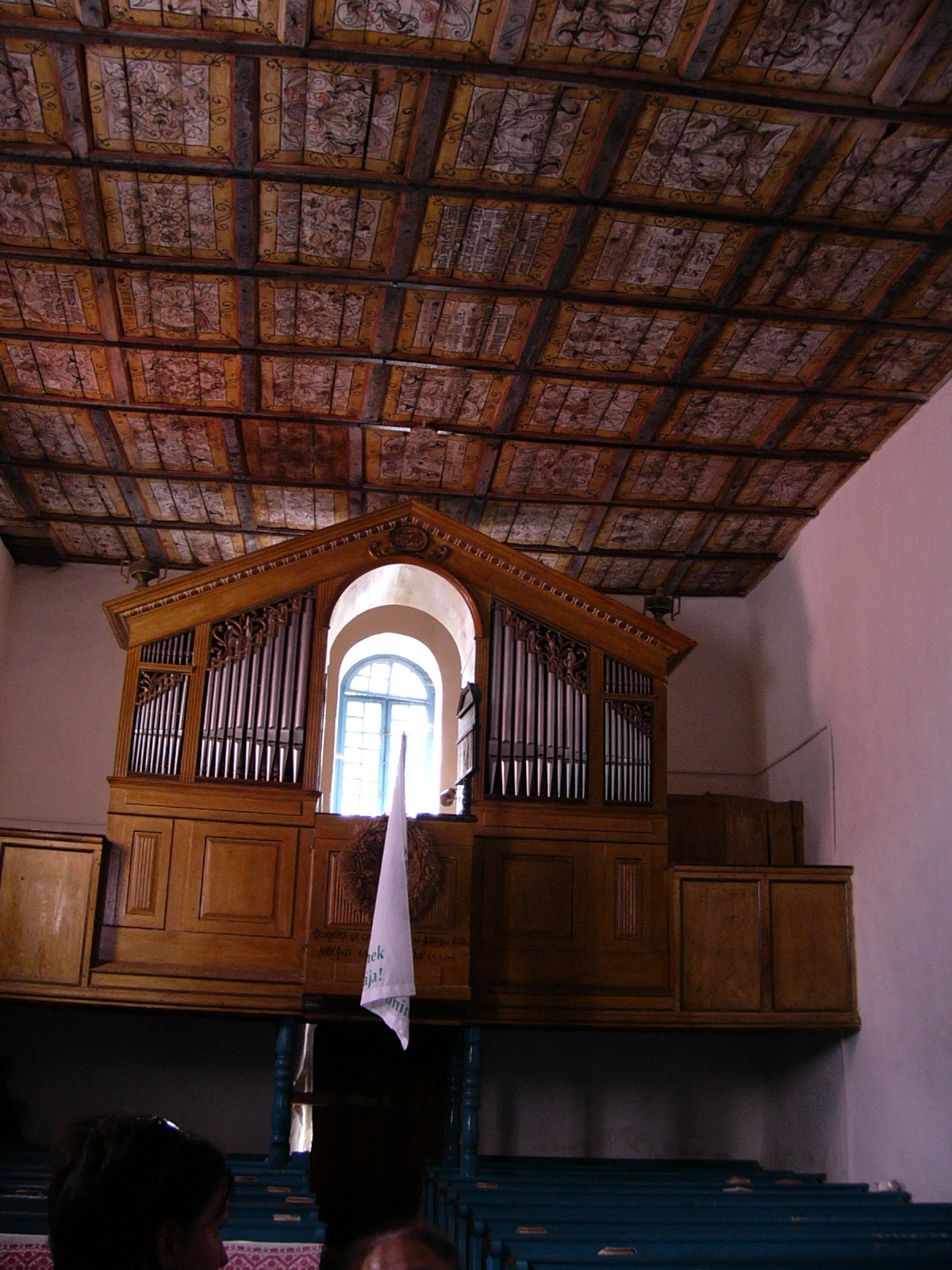
Unitarian church interior

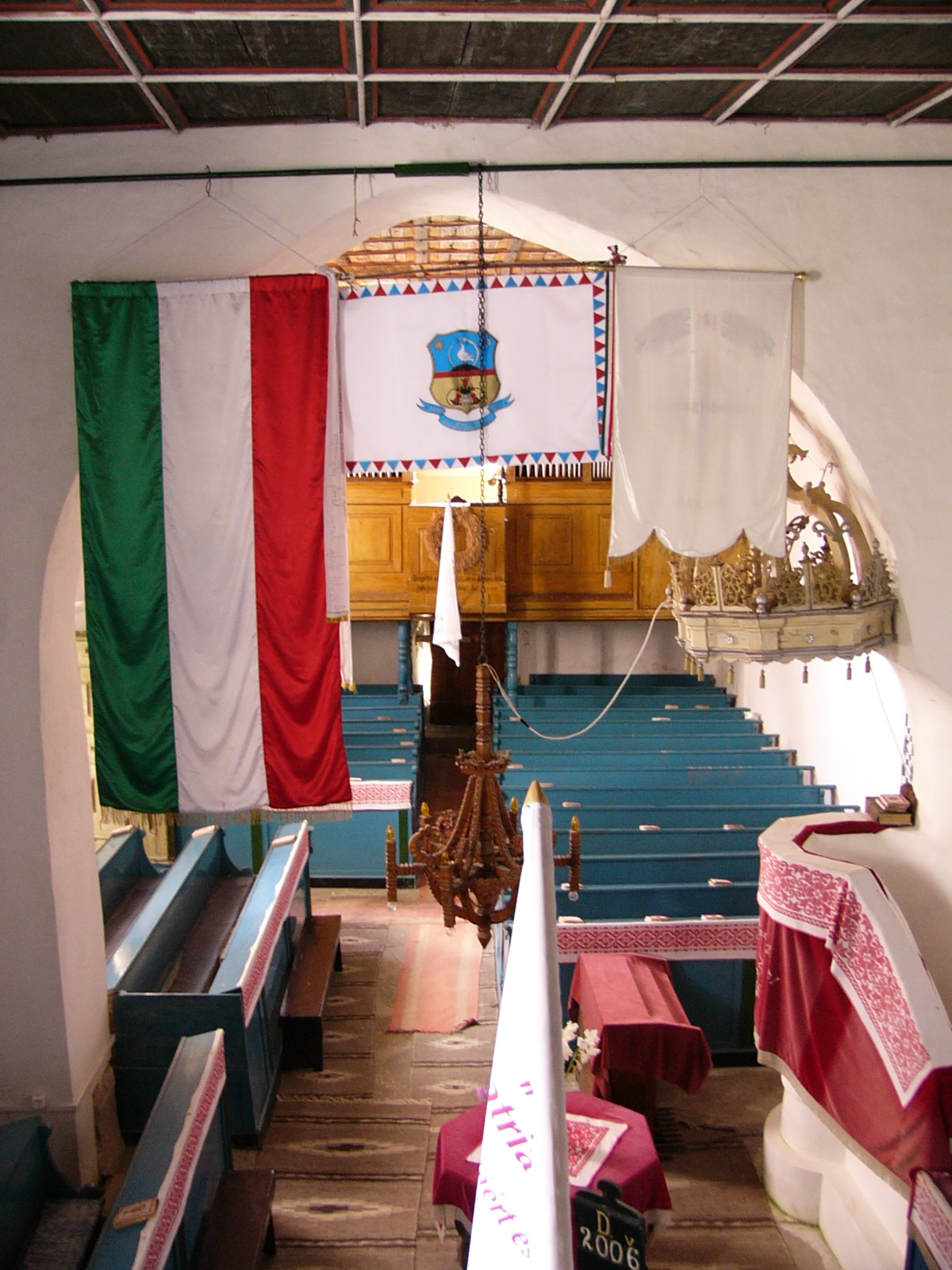
Unitarian church interior

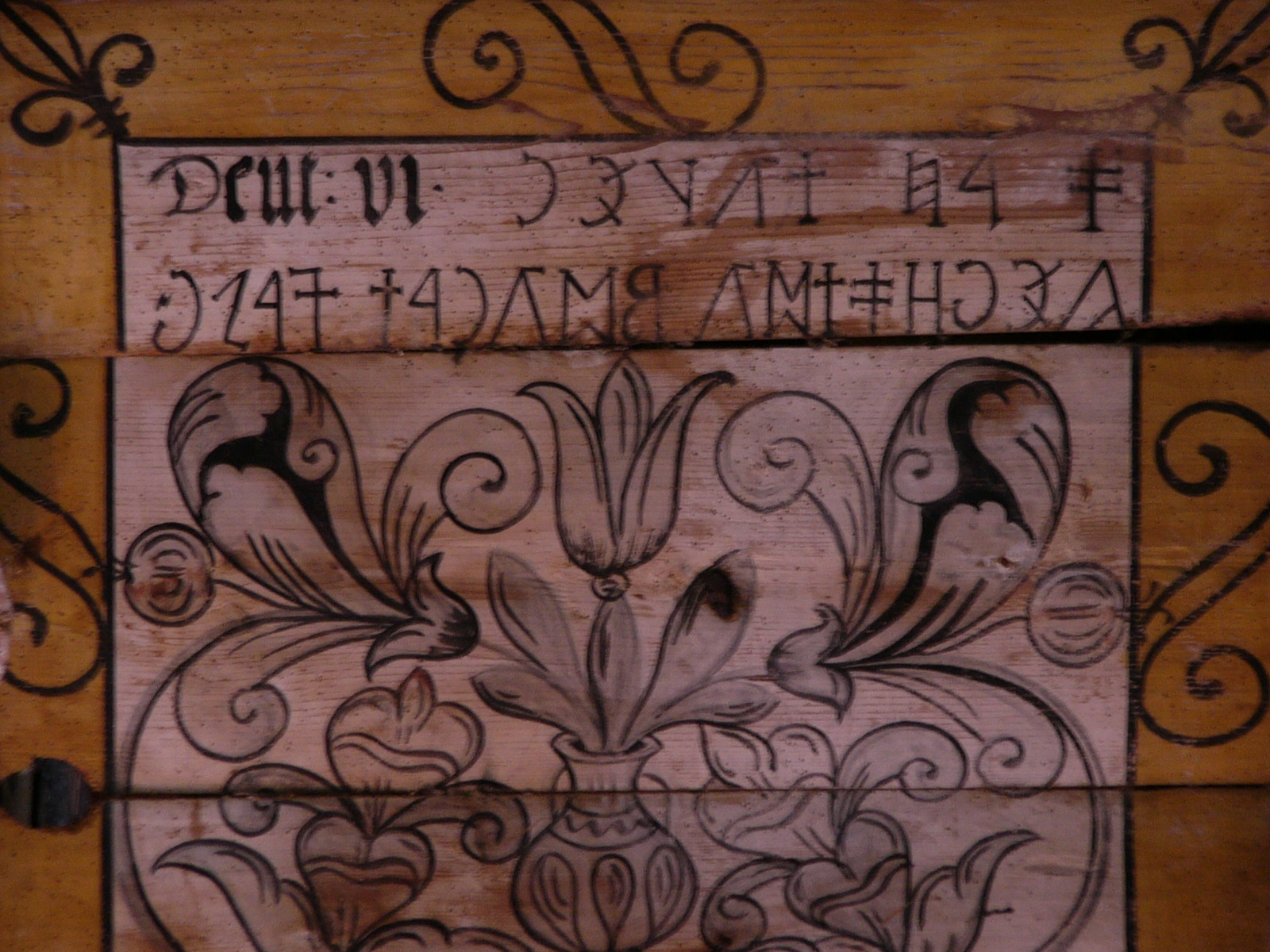
Székely runes
