= Sâncel =

- Commune
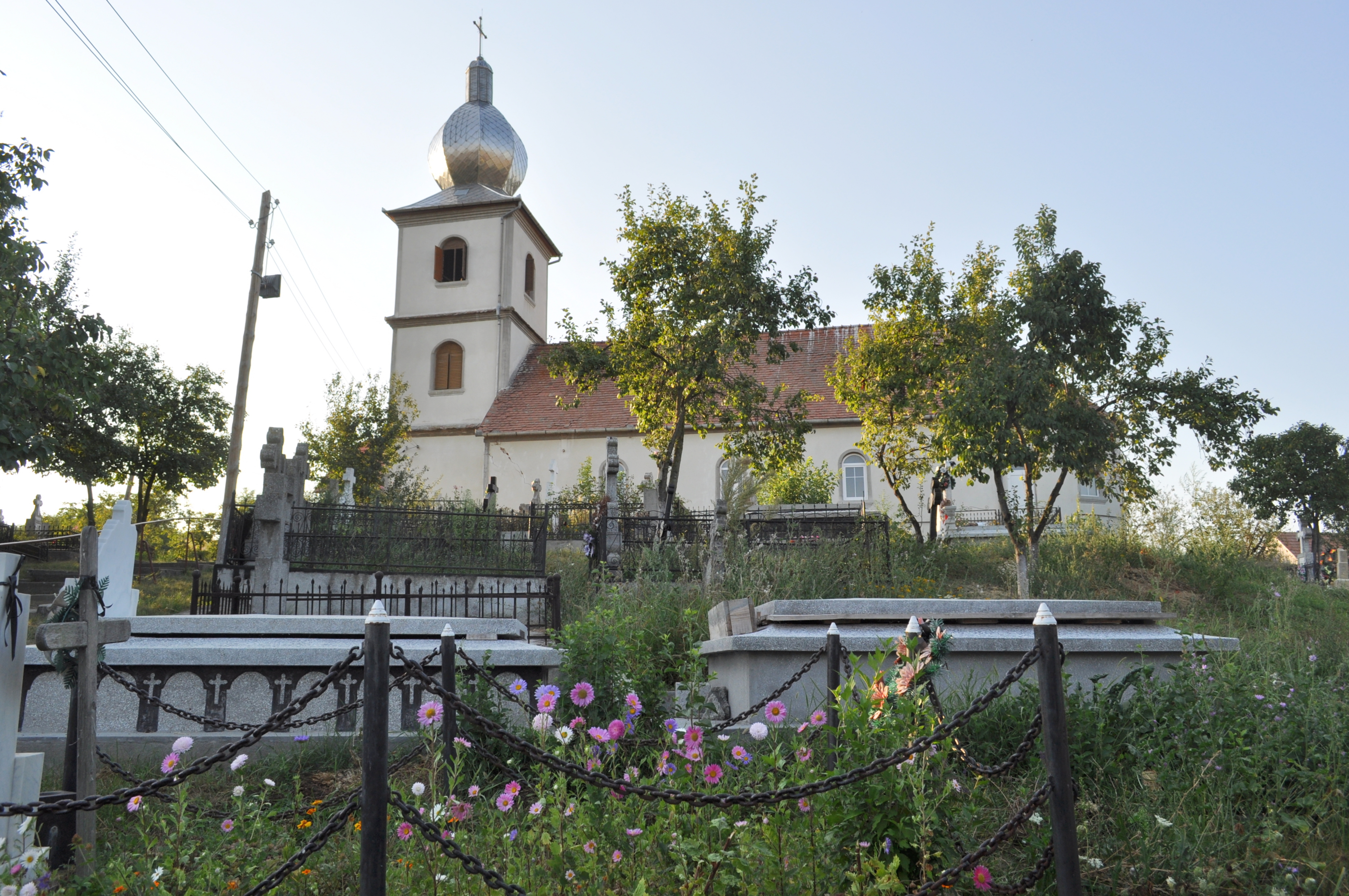
- Orthodox church in Pănade

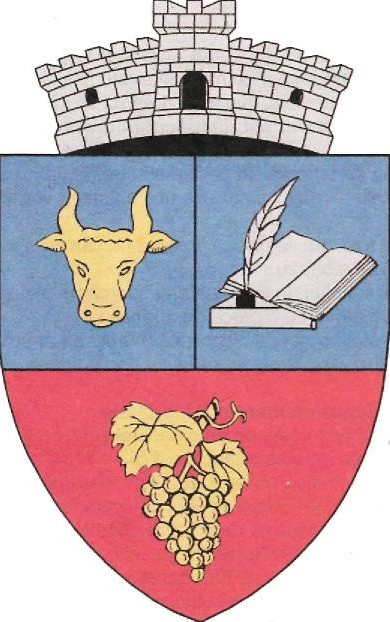
- Coat of arms

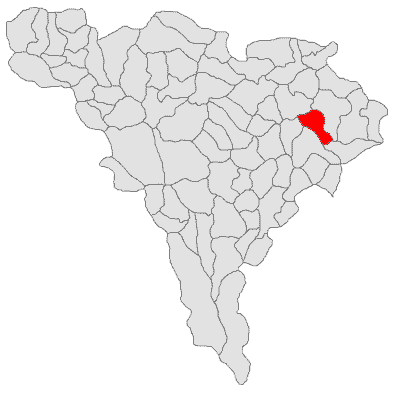
- Location in Alba County

- Location in Romania
- Coordinates: 46°12′N 23°57′E
- Country: Romania
- County: Alba

Government
  - Mayor (2020–2024): Ilie Frățilă (PNL)
- Area: 50.95 km^{2} (19.67 sq mi)
- Elevation: 270 m (890 ft)
- Population (2021-12-01): 2,255
  - Density: 44.26/km^{2} (114.6/sq mi)
- Time zone: UTC+02:00 (EET)
  - Summer (DST): UTC+03:00 (EEST)
- Postal code: 517660
- Area code: (+40) 02 58
- Vehicle reg.: AB
- Website: www.primariasincel.ro

Sâncel (German: Schinern; Hungarian: Szancsal) is a commune located in Alba County, Transylvania, Romania. It has a population of 2,255 as of 2021 and is composed of three villages: Iclod (Küküllőiklód), Pănade (Pánád), and Sâncel.

== Geography ==
The commune is situated on the Transylvanian Plateau, in the northeastern part of the county, 4 km (2.5 mi) from the city of Blaj and 43 km (27 mi) from the county seat, Alba Iulia. It lies at an altitude of 270 m (890 ft), on the banks of the river Târnava Mică.

== Demographics ==
Historical population
Year	Pop.	±%
1850	2,778	—
1910	3,296	+18.6%
1956	3,924	+19.1%
2002	2,790	−28.9%
2011	2,411	−13.6%
2021	2,255	−6.5%
Source: Census data

At the 2021 census, the commune had a population of 2,255, of which 80.98% were Romanians and 7.67% Roma.

== Natives ==
- Ion Brad (1929–2019), writer, politician, and diplomat
- Timotei Cipariu (1805–1887), cleric and academic, one of the founding members of the Romanian Academy
- Ioan Ignat (1869–?), educator, delegate at the Great National Assembly of Alba Iulia
