= Ghindari =

Ghindari Makfalva
- Commune
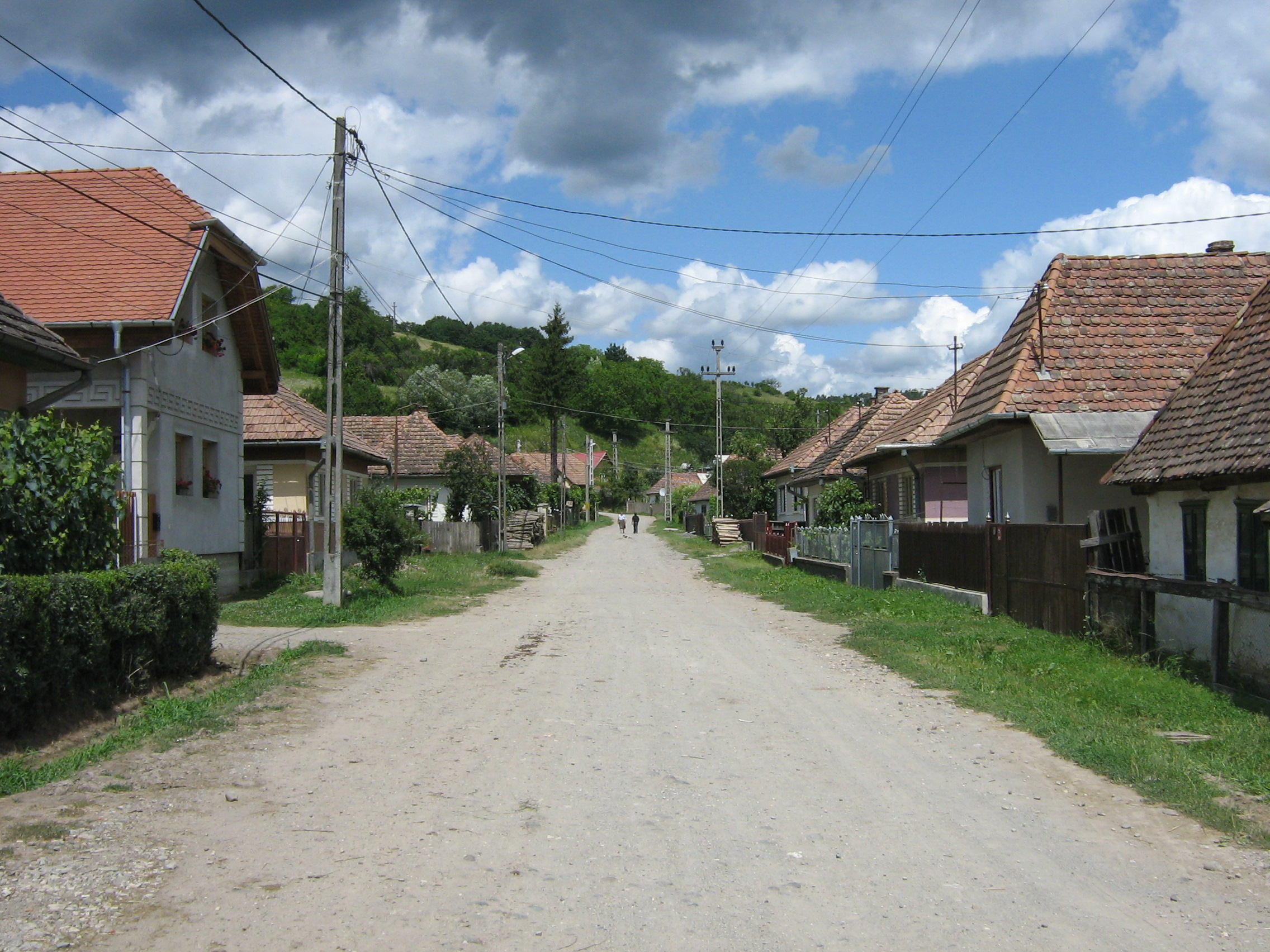

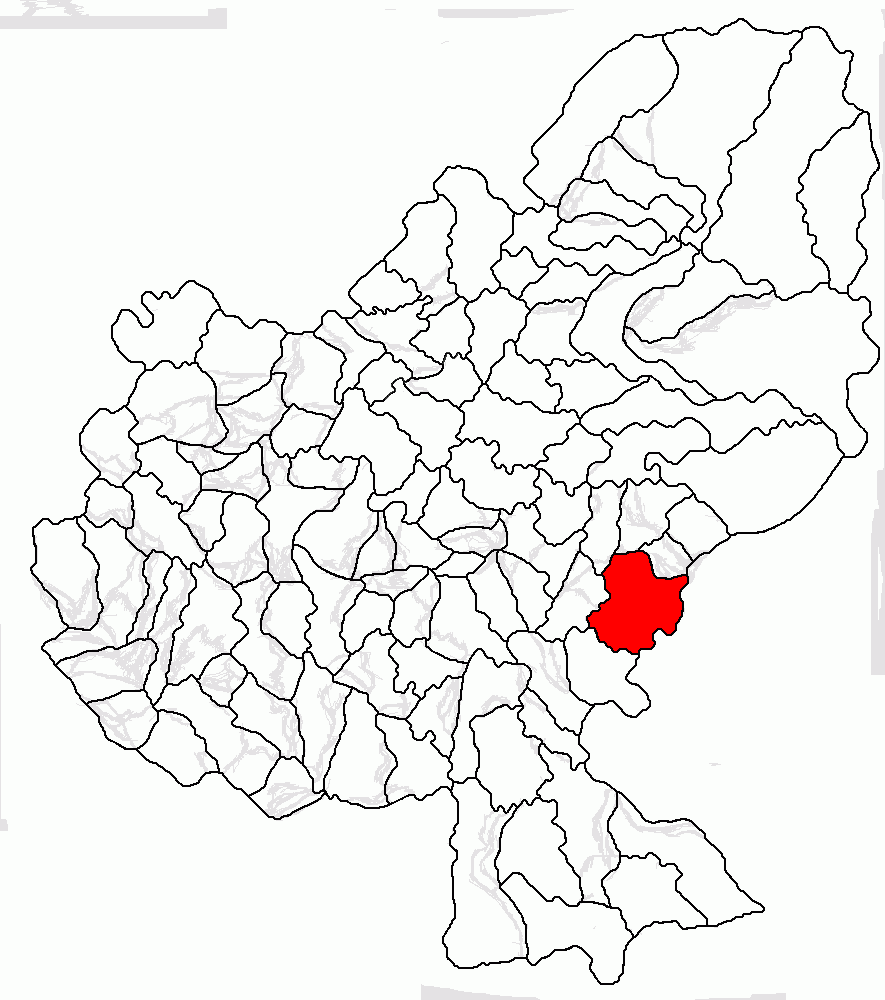
- Location in Mureș County

- Location in Romania
- Coordinates: 46°30′N 24°55′E
- Country: Romania
- County: Mureș

Government
  - Mayor (2020–2024): Imre Vass (AMT)
- Area: 81.23 km^{2} (31.36 sq mi)
- Elevation: 376 m (1,234 ft)
- Population (2021-12-01): 3,034
  - Density: 37.35/km^{2} (96.74/sq mi)
- Time zone: UTC+02:00 (EET)
  - Summer (DST): UTC+03:00 (EEST)
- Postal code: 547265
- Area code: +(40) 265
- Vehicle reg.: MS
- Website: ghindari.ro

Ghindari (Hungarian: Makfalva, Hungarian pronunciation: [ˈmɒkfɒlvɒ]; German: Eicheldorf) is a commune in Mureș County, Romania. It lies in the Székely Land, an ethno-cultural region in eastern Transylvania. The commune is composed of five villages: Abud (Székelyabod), Ceie (Cséje), Ghindari, Solocma (Szolokma), and Trei Sate (Hármasfalu). The latter village, in turn, is composed of three hamlets: Cioc (Csókfalva), Hotești (Atosfalva), and Ștefănești (Székelyszentistván).

== History ==
Until 1918, the villages belonged to the Maros-Torda County of the Kingdom of Hungary. After the Hungarian–Romanian War of 1918–19 and the Treaty of Trianon of 1920, the area became part of the Romania. In 2004, Chibed broke away to form an independent commune.

== Demographics ==
Historical population
Year	Pop.	±%
1850	5,599	—
1880	6,640	+18.6%
1900	7,520	+13.3%
1910	7,301	−2.9%
1920	7,184	−1.6%
1930	7,317	+1.9%
1956	7,906	+8.0%
1977	5,970	−24.5%
1992	5,290	−11.4%
2002	5,076	−4.0%
2011	3,250	−36.0%
2021	3,034	−6.6%
Source: Census data

The commune has an absolute Székely Hungarian majority. According to the 2011 census, it had a population of 3,250, of which 88.43% were Hungarians, 7.08% Roma, and 0.7% Romanians. At the 2021 census, Ghindari had a population of 3,034; of those, 72.45% were Hungarians, 20.01% Roma, and 1.02% Romanians.

== See also ==
- List of Hungarian exonyms (Mureș County)

== Gallery ==
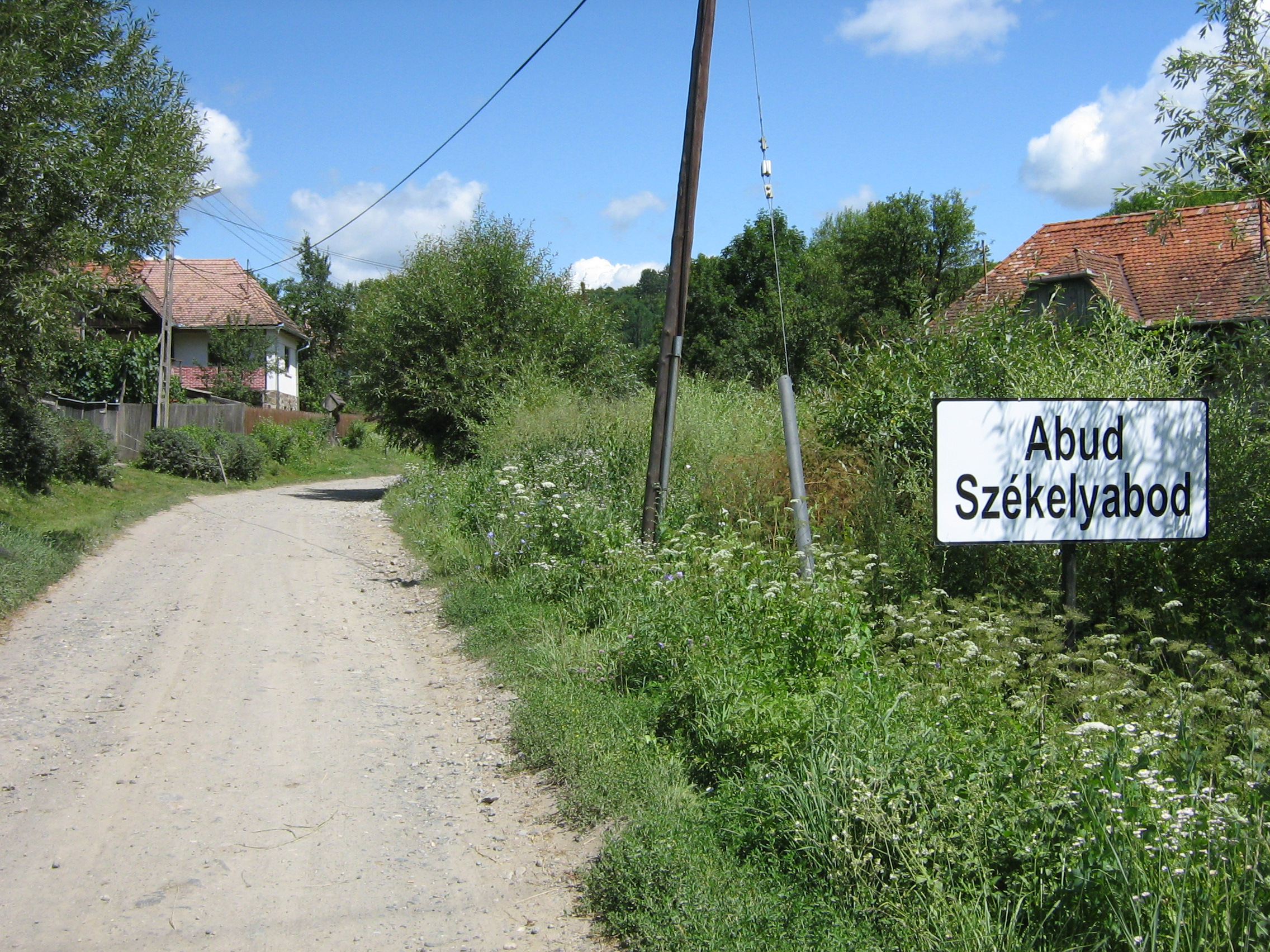
Abud

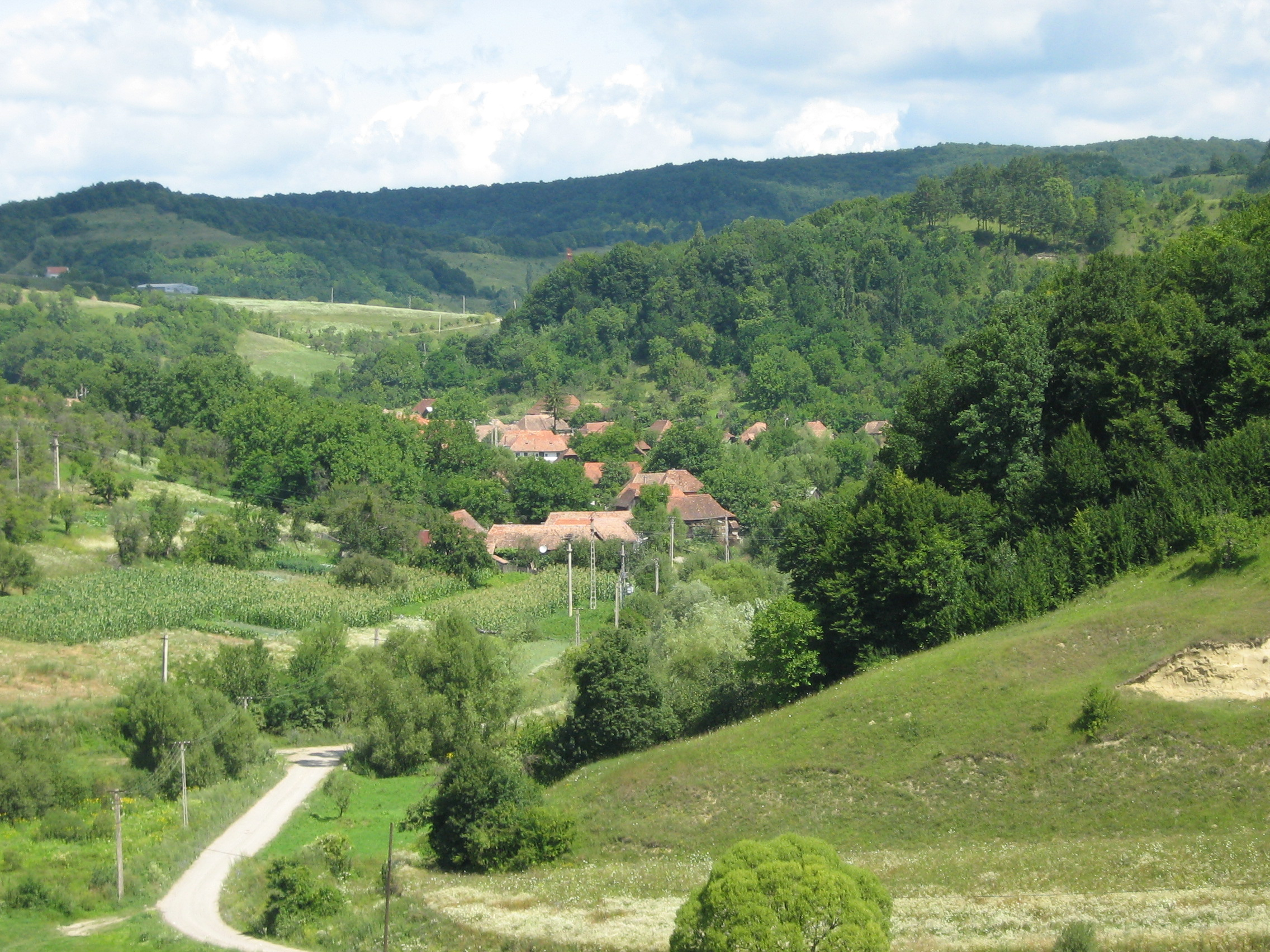
Abud

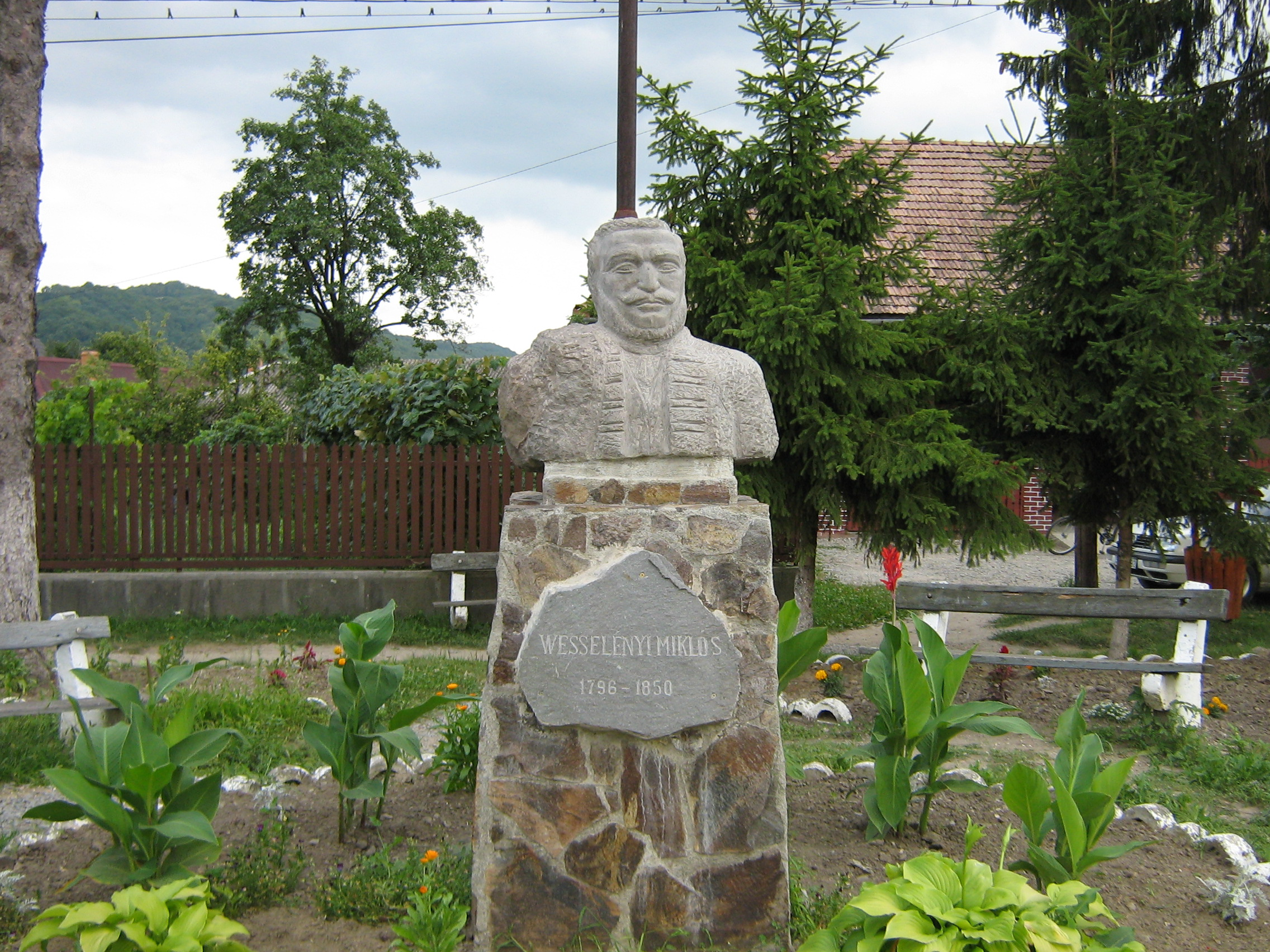
Statue of Miklós Wesselényi

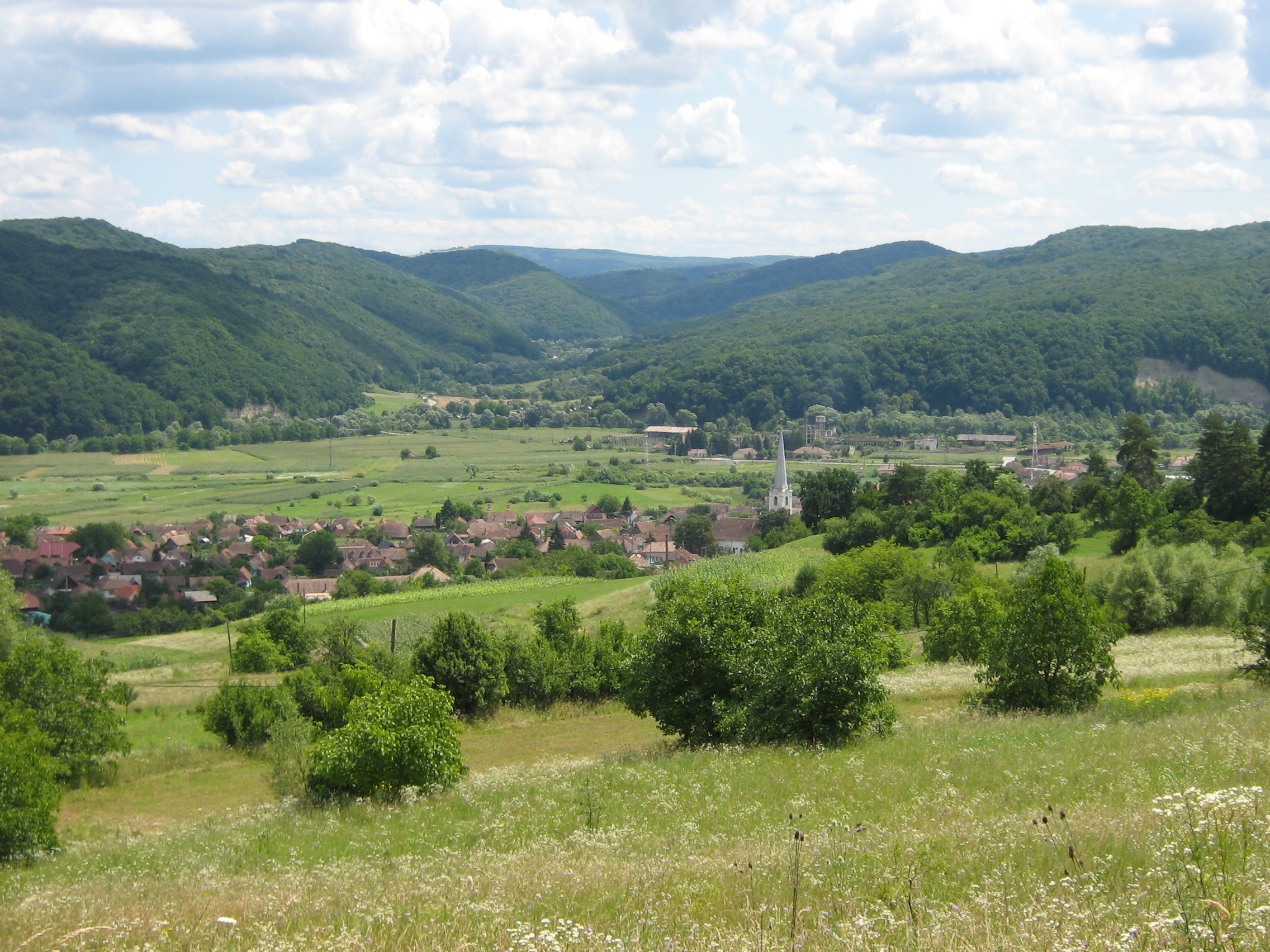
View of Ghindari village

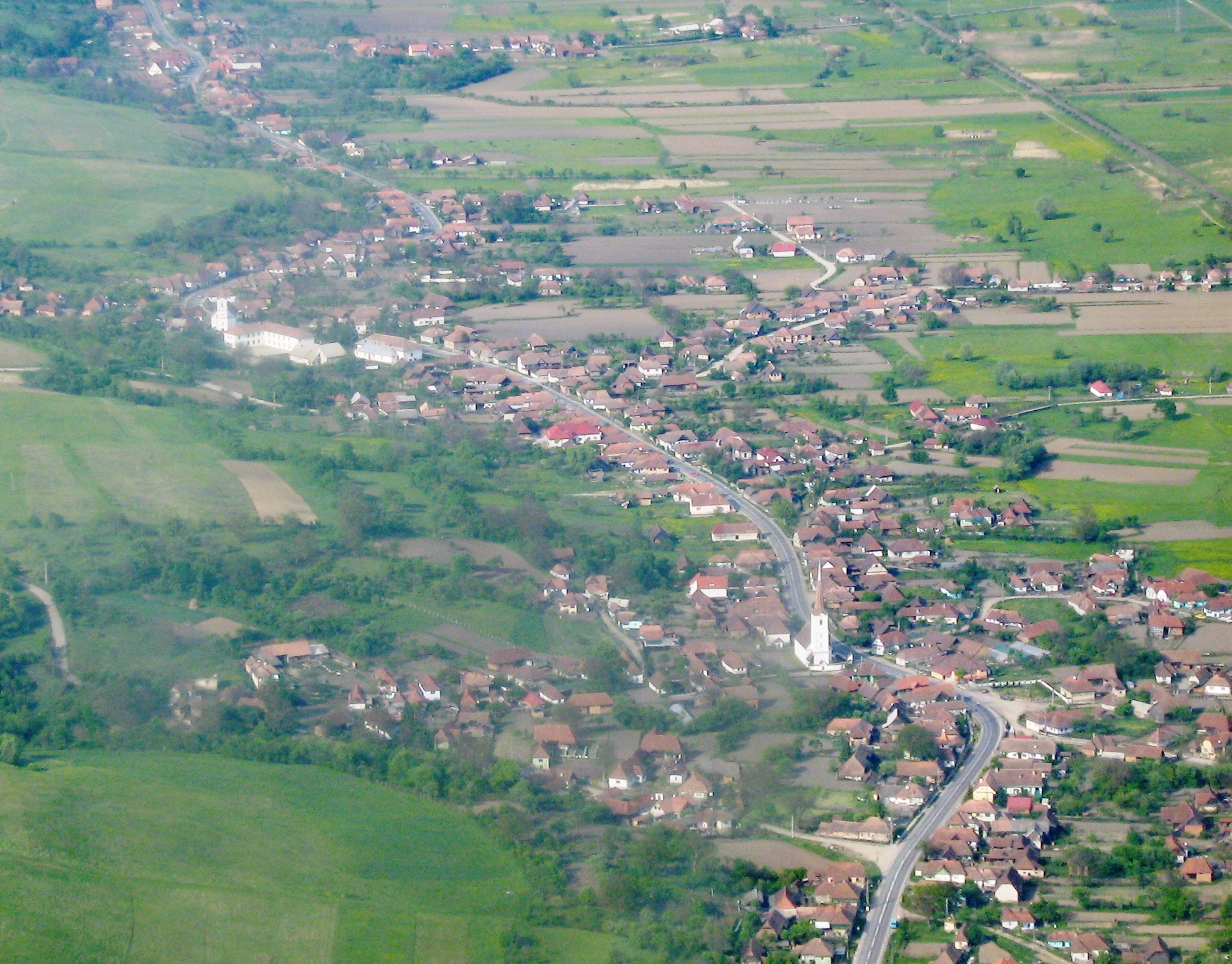
Trei Sate
