= Bălăușeri =

Bălăușeri Balavásár
- Commune
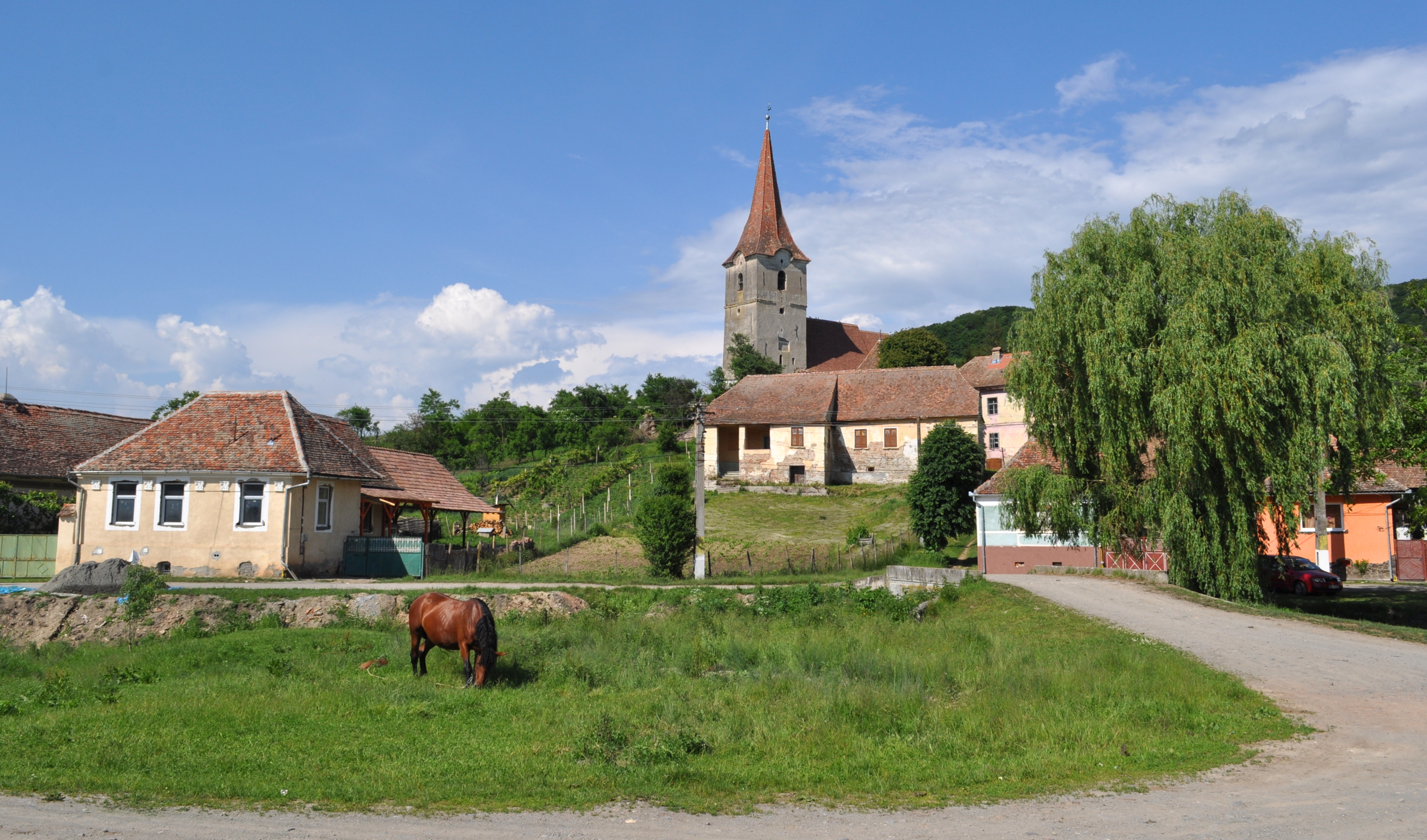
- Lutheran church in Filitelnic

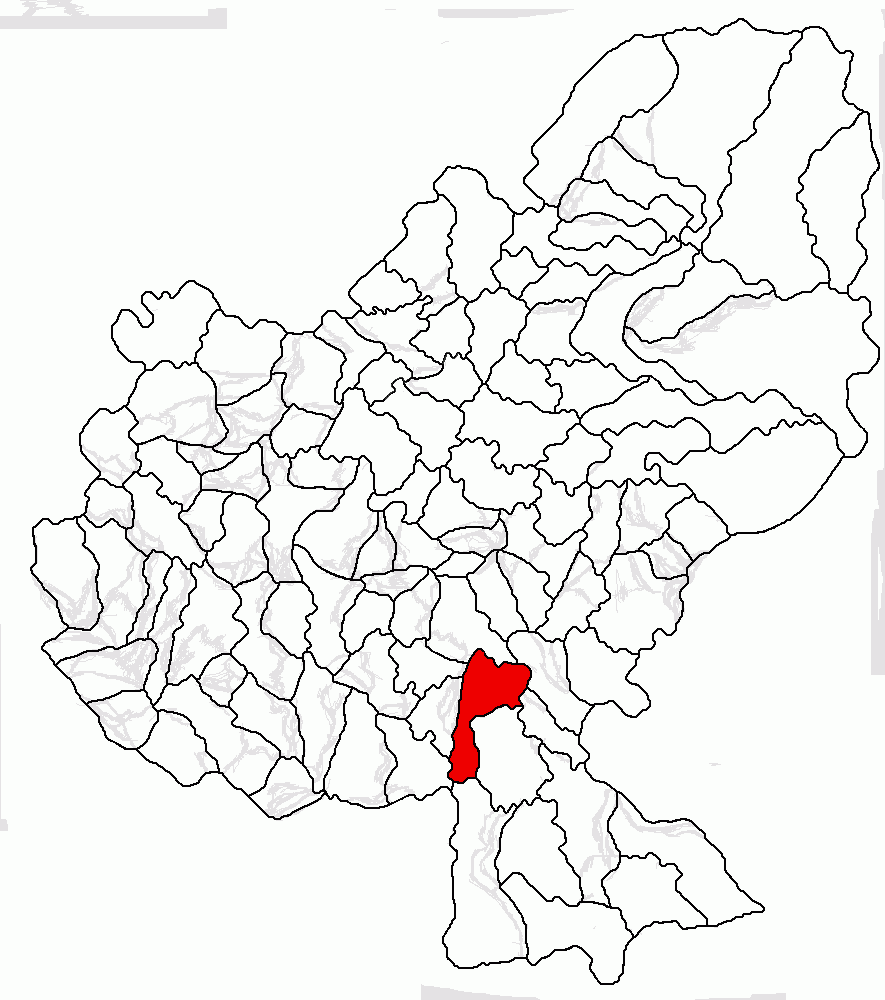
- Location in Mureș County

- Location in Romania
- Coordinates: 46°24′0″N 24°41′0″E
- Country: Romania
- County: Mureș

Government
  - Mayor (2020–2024): András-Adorján Varga (UDMR)
- Area: 39.37 km^{2} (15.20 sq mi)
- Elevation: 322 m (1,056 ft)
- Population (2021-12-01): 4,852
  - Density: 123.2/km^{2} (319.2/sq mi)
- Time zone: UTC+02:00 (EET)
  - Summer (DST): UTC+03:00 (EEST)
- Postal code: 547100
- Area code: +(40) 265
- Vehicle reg.: MS
- Website: balauseri.ro

Bălăușeri (Hungarian: Balavásár; Hungarian pronunciation: [bɒlɒvaːʃaːr]; German: Bladenmarkt) is a commune in Mureș County, Transylvania, Romania. It is composed of six villages: Agrișteu (Egrestő; Agreschteln), Bălăușeri, Chendu (Nagykend; Großkend), Dumitreni (Szentdemeter; Mettersdorf), Filitelnic (Fületelke; Felldorf), and Senereuș (Szénaverős; Zendersch).

== History ==
The villages were in the northern reaches of Küküllő County in Transylvania, just over the border from the Székely Land; in the 1876 administrative reform, the county was split and thereafter the villages belonged to Kis-Küküllő County in the Kingdom of Hungary. After the Hungarian–Romanian War of 1918–19 and the Treaty of Trianon of 1920, it became part of the Kingdom of Romania, along with the rest of Transylvania.

== Demographics ==
According to the 2011 census, the commune had a population of 4,698, of which 3,195 (68.01%) were Hungarians, 905 (17.58%) Romanians, 662 (14.09%) Roma, and 10 Germans; Bălăușeri village had a population of 1,228 people. At the 2021 census, the commune had a population of 4,852; of those, 61.21% were Hungarians, 21.7% Romanians, and 13.27% Roma.

== Economy ==
The Filitelnic gas field (one of the top two gas fields in Romania in terms of production) is located on the territory of the commune.

== See also ==
- List of Hungarian exonyms (Mureș County)
