= Apold =

- Commune
- Apold in 2024

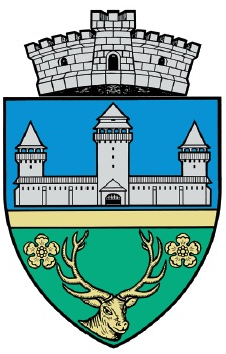
- Coat of arms

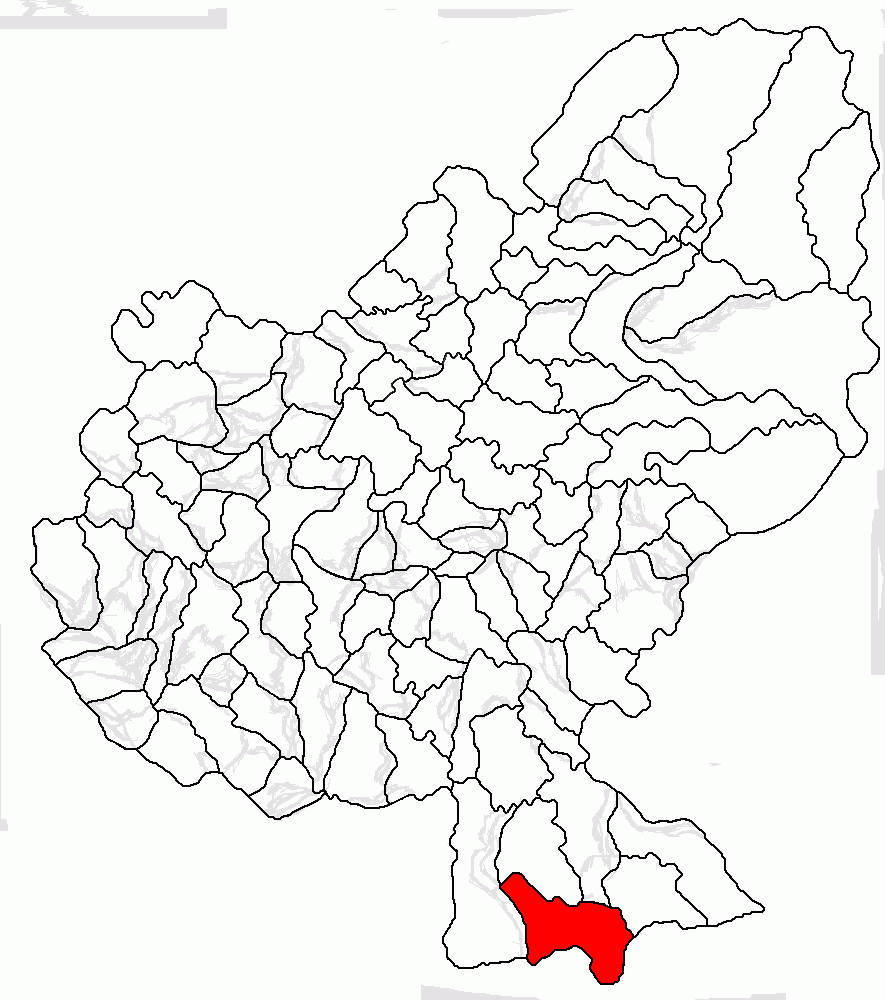
- Location in Mureș County

- Location in Romania
- Coordinates: 46°7′N 24°49′E
- Country: Romania
- County: Mureș
- Area: 125.41 km^{2} (48.42 sq mi)
- Elevation: 424 m (1,391 ft)
- Highest elevation: 707 m (2,320 ft)
- Population (2021-12-01): 3,065
  - Density: 24.44/km^{2} (63.30/sq mi)
- Time zone: UTC+02:00 (EET)
  - Summer (DST): UTC+03:00 (EEST)
- Postal code: 547040
- Area code: (+40) 02 65
- Vehicle reg.: MS
- Website: comunaapold.ro

Apold (German: Trapold) is a commune in Mureș County, Transylvania, Romania. It is composed of four villages: Apold, Daia (Denndorf; Dálya or Szászdálya), Șaeș (Schaas; Segesd), and Vulcan (Wolkendorf; Volkány). The route of the Via Transilvanica long-distance trail passes through the village of Daia.

== Geography ==
The commune is located in the southern part of the county, on the border with Brașov and Sibiu counties. Its neighbors are as follows:

- West: the commune Daneș.
- East: the commune Saschiz.
- North: the city of Sighișoara, and the communes Albești and Vânători.
- South: the commune Brădeni, in Sibiu County.
- South-East: the commune Bunești, in Brașov County.

Apold is traversed on a distance of 32 km (20 mi) by the river Șaeș, a left tributary of the Târnava Mare. The highest elevation is attained on the Bironului Hill, at 707 m (2,320 ft).

== Demographics ==
Historical population
Year	Pop.	±%
1850	3,721	—
1880	3,873	+4.1%
1900	4,050	+4.6%
1910	3,896	−3.8%
1930	4,114	+5.6%
1956	3,835	−6.8%
1977	3,418	−10.9%
1992	2,471	−27.7%
2002	2,722	+10.2%
2011	2,892	+6.2%
2021	3,065	+6.0%
Source: Census data

At the 2021 census, the commune had a population of 3,065; of those, 86.79% were Romanians, 5.51% Roma, 1.5% Hungarians, and 1.14% Germans.

== Notable people ==
- Roland Gunnesch (born 1944), handball player
- Radu Voina (born 1950), handball player and head coach
- Gabriel Mureșan (1982–2026), footballer, mayor of Apold from 2020 until his death.

== See also ==
- List of Hungarian exonyms (Mureș County)

== Gallery ==
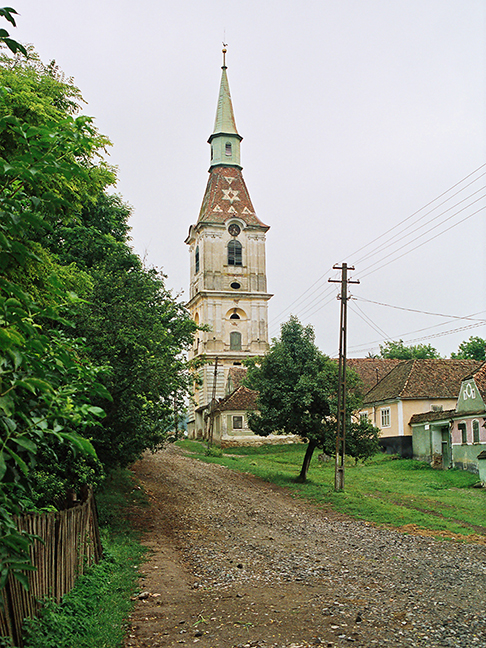
Church in Daia

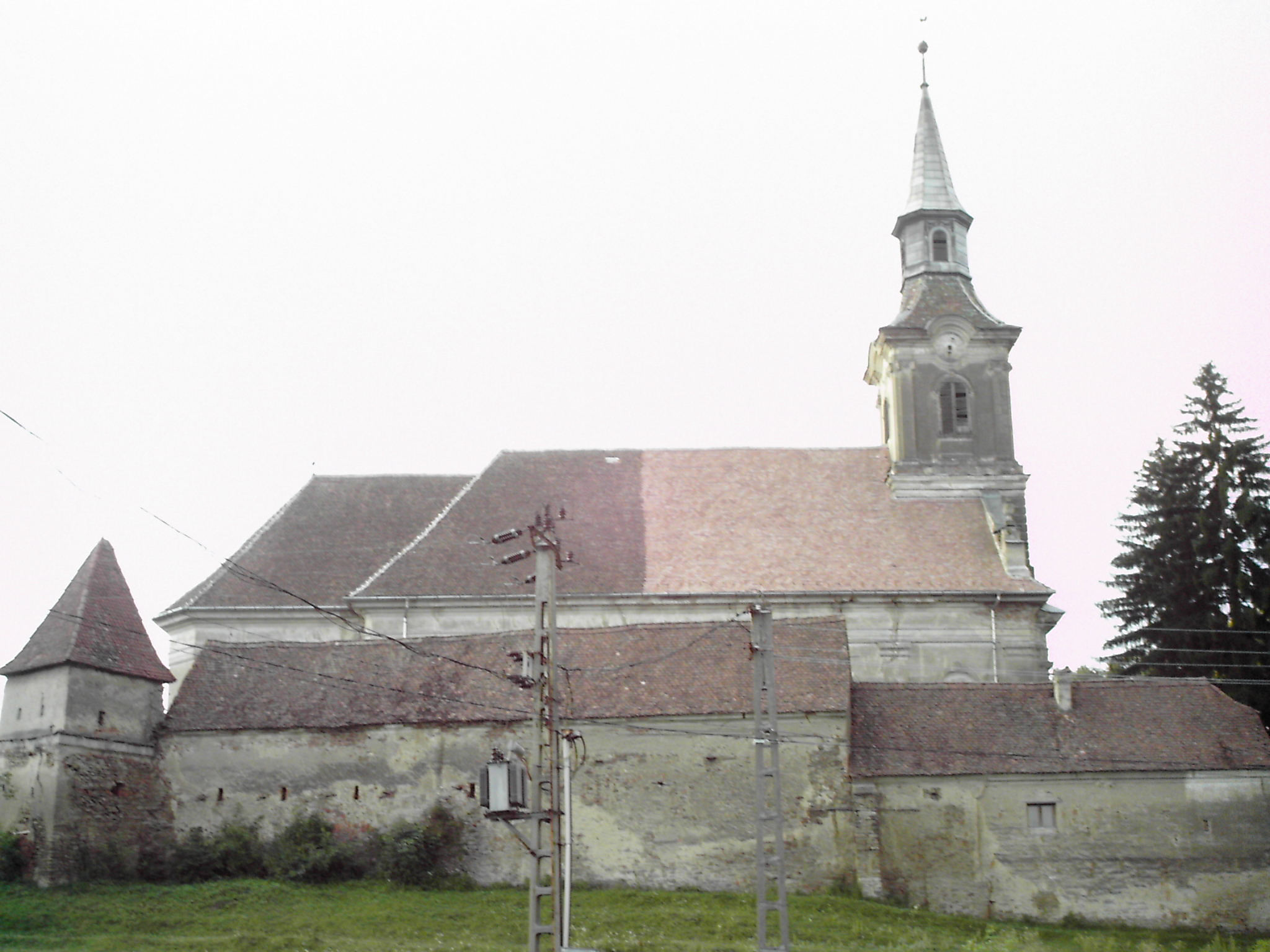
Fortified Saxon church in Șaeș
