= Brădești (Târnava Mare) =

- Location within Romania

Location
- Country: Romania
- Counties: Harghita County
- Villages: Satu Mare, Brădești

Physical characteristics
- Mouth: Târnava Mare
  - location: Brădești
  - coordinates: 46.3393°N 25.3368°E
- Length: 18 km (11 mi)
- Basin size: 80 km^{2} (31 sq mi)

Basin features
- Progression: Târnava Mare→ Târnava→ Mureș→ Tisza→ Danube→ Black Sea
- Tributaries
  - left: Pârâul Pietros
  - right: Teleșau

The Brădești is a left tributary of the river Târnava Mare in Romania. It discharges into the Târnava Mare in the village Brădești. Its length is 18 km (11 mi) and its basin size is 80 km^{2} (31 sq mi).
