= Criș (Târnava Mare) =

- Location within Romania

Location
- Country: Romania
- Counties: Mureș County
- Villages: Criș, Daneș

Physical characteristics
- Mouth: Târnava Mare
  - location: Daneș
  - coordinates: 46.2303°N 24.6901°E

Basin features
- Progression: Târnava Mare→ Târnava→ Mureș→ Tisza→ Danube→ Black Sea
- Tributaries
  - right: Stejăreni

The Criș is a left tributary of the river Târnava Mare in Romania. It flows into the Târnava Mare in Daneș. Its length is 20 km (12 mi) and its basin size is 84 km^{2} (32 sq mi).
