= Curciu =

- Location within Romania

Location
- Country: Romania
- Counties: Sibiu County
- Villages: Curciu, Dârlos

Physical characteristics
- Mouth: Târnava Mare
  - location: Dârlos
  - coordinates: 46.1813°N 24.4029°E
- Length: 10 km (6.2 mi)
- Basin size: 27 km^{2} (10 sq mi)

Basin features
- Progression: Târnava Mare→ Târnava→ Mureș→ Tisza→ Danube→ Black Sea

The Curciu is a right tributary of the river Târnava Mare in Romania. It flows into the Târnava Mare in Dârlos. Its length is 10 km (6.2 mi) and its basin size is 27 km^{2} (10 sq mi).
