= Hosszúpatak =

Hosszúpatak is the Hungarian name for two villages in Romania:

- Tăuni village, Valea Lungă Commune, Alba County
- Valea Lungă village, Dârlos Commune, Sibiu County
