= Șapartoc =

- Location within Romania

Location
- Country: Romania
- Counties: Mureș County
- Villages: Șapartoc, Albești

Physical characteristics
- Mouth: Târnava Mare
  - location: Albești
  - coordinates: 46.2430°N 24.8390°E

Basin features
- Progression: Târnava Mare→ Târnava→ Mureș→ Tisza→ Danube→ Black Sea

The Șapartoc is a left tributary of the river Târnava Mare in Romania. It flows into the Târnava Mare in Albești. Its length is 11 km (6.8 mi) and its basin size is 17 km^{2} (6.6 sq mi).
