= Valea Morii =

Valea Morii may refer to several places in Romania:

- Valea Morii, a village in Vidra Commune, Alba County
- Valea Morii, a village in Bezdead Commune, Dâmbovița County
- Valea Morii, a village in the town of Tășnad, Satu Mare County
- Valea Morii, a tributary of the Izvor in Bihor County
- Valea Morii (Hârtibaciu), a tributary of the Hârtibaciu in Brașov and Sibiu Counties
- Valea Morii (Iza), a tributary of the Iza in Maramureș County
- Valea Morii, a tributary of the Valea Luncanilor in Hunedoara County
- Valea Morii (Pârâul de Câmpie), a tributary of the Pârâul de Câmpie in Cluj and Mureș Counties
- Valea Morii (Târnava Mare), a tributary of the Târnava Mare in Mureș County
- Valea Morii, a tributary of the Vișeu in Maramureș County
