= Hodoș (Târnava Mare) =

- Location within Romania

Location
- Country: Romania
- Counties: Harghita County
- Villages: Ulieș, Nicolești, Oțeni

Physical characteristics
- Mouth: Târnava Mare
  - location: Oțeni
  - coordinates: 46.2625°N 25.2496°E
- Length: 15 km (9.3 mi)
- Basin size: 48 km^{2} (19 sq mi)

Basin features
- Progression: Târnava Mare→ Târnava→ Mureș→ Tisza→ Danube→ Black Sea
- Tributaries
  - right: Pârâul Blond

The Hodoș is a left tributary of the river Târnava Mare in Romania. It discharges into the Târnava Mare in Oțeni. Its length is 15 km (9.3 mi) and its basin size is 48 km^{2} (19 sq mi).
