= Satu Mare, Harghita =

Satu Mare Máréfalva
- Commune
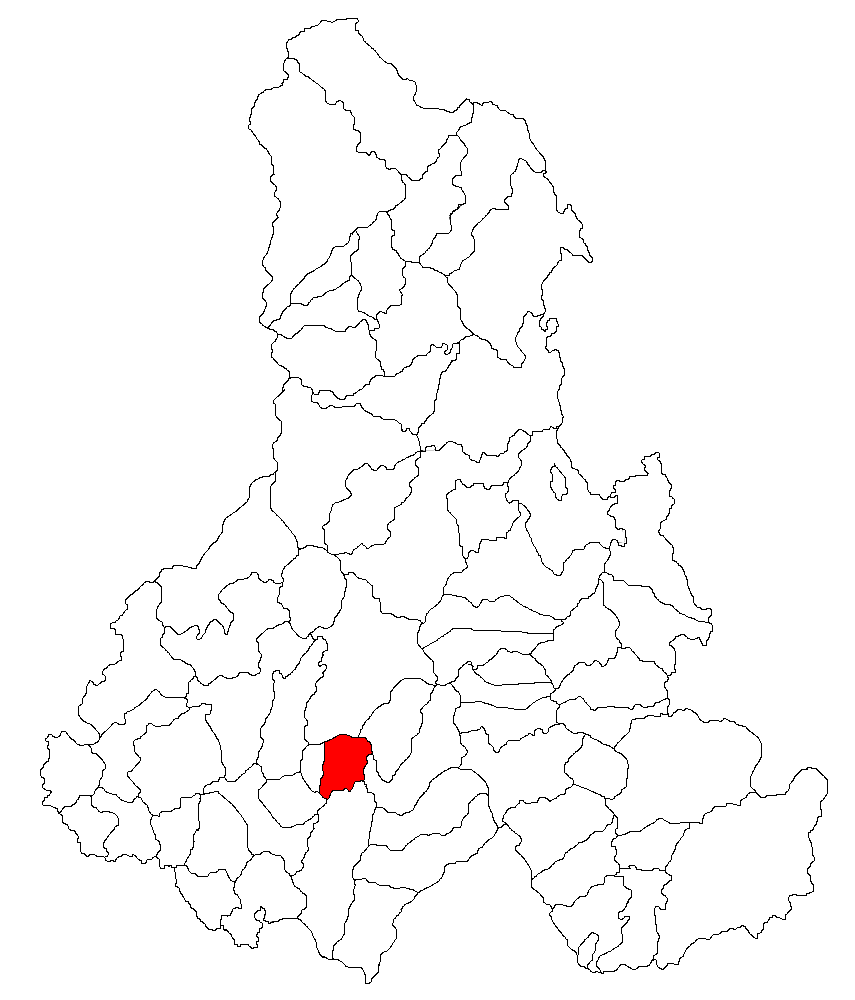
- Location in Harghita County

- Location in Romania
- Coordinates: 46°20′0″N 25°22′0″E
- Country: Romania
- County: Harghita

Government
  - Mayor (2020–2024): Imre Kovács (UDMR)
- Area: 39.89 km^{2} (15.40 sq mi)
- Population (2021-12-01): 1,995
  - Density: 50/km^{2} (130/sq mi)
- Time zone: EET/EEST (UTC+2/+3)
- Postal code: 537026
- Area code: +40 266
- Vehicle reg.: HR
- Website: www.marefalva.ro

Satu Mare (Hungarian: Máréfalva, pronounced [ˈmaːreːfɒlvɒ]) is a commune in Harghita County, Romania. It lies in the Székely Land, an ethno-cultural region in eastern Transylvania, and is not to be confused with the large city of Satu Mare in Satu Mare County. It is composed of a single village, Satu Mare.

== History ==
Its Hungarian name was first recorded in 1566 as Marefalwa, in 1602 as Máréfalva. Its first Romanian name originated from the Hungarian form as Marefalău. After 1919, Romanian authorities first renamed it Satul Mare, later Satu Mare.

The village was part of the Székely Land region of the historical Transylvania province. It belonged to Udvarhelyszék district until the administrative reform of Transylvania in 1876, when they fell within the Udvarhely County in the Kingdom of Hungary. After the Treaty of Trianon of 1920, they became part of Romania and fell within Odorhei County during the interwar period. In 1940, the second Vienna Award granted Northern Transylvania to Hungary and the villages were held by Hungary until 1944. After Soviet occupation, the Romanian administration returned and the village formally became part of Romania again in 1947. Between 1952 and 1960, the village fell within the Magyar Autonomous Region, between 1960 and 1968 the Mureș-Magyar Autonomous Region. In 1968, the province was abolished, and since then, the village has been part of Harghita County. Part of Brădești Commune until 2004, it was split off to form its own commune that year.

== Demographics ==
The commune has an absolute Hungarian (Székely) majority. According to the 2011 census it has a population of 1,958 of which 99.63% or 1,952 are Hungarian.

== Sights of interest ==
The commune is home to some 95 beautiful Székely gates, the famous Székely engraved and painted wooden gates.

This traditional village, famous for its dove-cotted gates, lies at an altitude of 540–560 m, in the narrow valley of the Fenyéd Stream, along the 13A road, 9 km from Odorheiu Secuiesc, at the foot of the Cekend Plateau.

Székelykapu or Székely gates: The greatest number of large, carved, dove-cotted Székely gates of the former (Udvarhelyszék) can be found here. The gates are also known as carved, flowery gates, as the ornamental motives are carved in the columns with different semicircular chisels. Their value as museum pieces is obvious. Because of their rich decoration these gates can be called flowery gates as well. The gates of Udvarhelyszék differ from those of historical-ethnographical districts of Csíkszék, Kászonszék, Gyergyószék and Háromszék in their rich ornamentation.

== Twinning ==
The village is twinned with:

- Magyaregregy, Hungary
