= Ațel (river) =

- Location within Romania

Location
- Country: Romania
- Counties: Sibiu County
- Villages: Ațel

Physical characteristics
- Mouth: Târnava Mare
  - location: Upstream of Brateiu
  - coordinates: 46.2011°N 24.4667°E
- Length: 9 km (5.6 mi)
- Basin size: 34 km^{2} (13 sq mi)

Basin features
- Progression: Târnava Mare→ Târnava→ Mureș→ Tisza→ Danube→ Black Sea
- Tributaries
  - right: Dupuș

The Ațel is a left tributary of the river Târnava Mare in Romania. It flows into the Târnava Mare near the village Alma. Its length is 9 km (5.6 mi) and its basin size is 34 km^{2} (13 sq mi).
