= Moșna (Târnava Mare) =

- Location within Romania

Location
- Country: Romania
- Counties: Sibiu County
- Villages: Moșna

Physical characteristics
- Mouth: Târnava Mare
  - location: Mediaș
  - coordinates: 46.1718°N 24.3593°E
- Length: 15 km (9.3 mi)
- Basin size: 59 km^{2} (23 sq mi)

Basin features
- Progression: Târnava Mare→ Târnava→ Mureș→ Tisza→ Danube→ Black Sea
- Tributaries
  - right: Nemșa

The Moșna is a left tributary of the river Târnava Mare in Romania. It discharges into the Târnava Mare in Mediaș. Its length is 15 km (9.3 mi) and its basin size is 59 km^{2} (23 sq mi). The Moșna Dam is constructed on this river.
