= Valea Lungă (Târnava Mare) =

- Location within Romania

Location
- Country: Romania
- Counties: Alba County
- Villages: Tăuni, Valea Lungă

Physical characteristics
- Mouth: Târnava Mare
  - location: Valea Lungă
  - coordinates: 46.1163°N 24.0269°E
- Length: 14 km (8.7 mi)
- Basin size: 35 km^{2} (14 sq mi)

Basin features
- Progression: Târnava Mare→ Târnava→ Mureș→ Tisza→ Danube→ Black Sea

The Valea Lungă is a right tributary of the river Târnava Mare in Romania. It flows into the Târnava Mare in the village Valea Lungă. Its length is 14 km (8.7 mi) and its basin size is 35 km^{2} (14 sq mi).
