= Balázs Orbán =

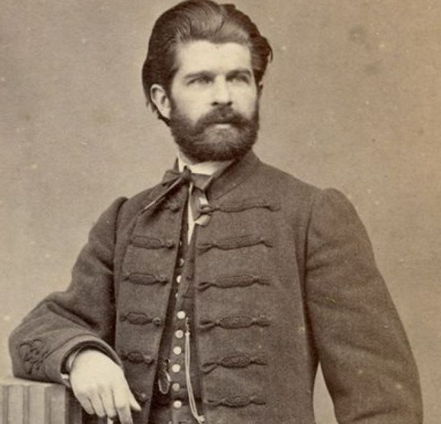
- Balázs Orbán’s photograph from the 1860s
- Born: 3 February 1829; Lengyelfalva, Principality of Transylvania (today Polonița, Romania)
- Died: 19 April 1890 (aged 61); Budapest, Hungary
- Occupations: Writer, Historian and Politician
- Writing career
- Notable works: "Description of the Székely Land from the point of view of history, archaeology, geography and folklore"

Balázs Orbán, Baron of Lengyelfalva (3 February 1829 – 19 April 1890) was a Hungarian author, ethnographic collector, parliamentarian, correspondent member of the Hungarian Academy of Sciences (1887). He is called "the Greatest Székely."

== Life ==
He was born at Lengyelfalva, near Székelyudvarhely, Principality of Transylvania (today Polonița, Romania), into an old Székely family from Udvarhelyszék. His father, János Orbán, Baron of Lengyelfalva (1779-1871) was a parliamentarian, who during the French wars was an army officer; his mother was Eugénia Knechtel (1810-1883), born into an ethnic Greek family in Constantinople. The Baron title was given to Orbán by Maria Theresa to the great-grandfather of Balázs Orbán, Elek Orbán von Lengyelfalva on the 13th of November 1744.

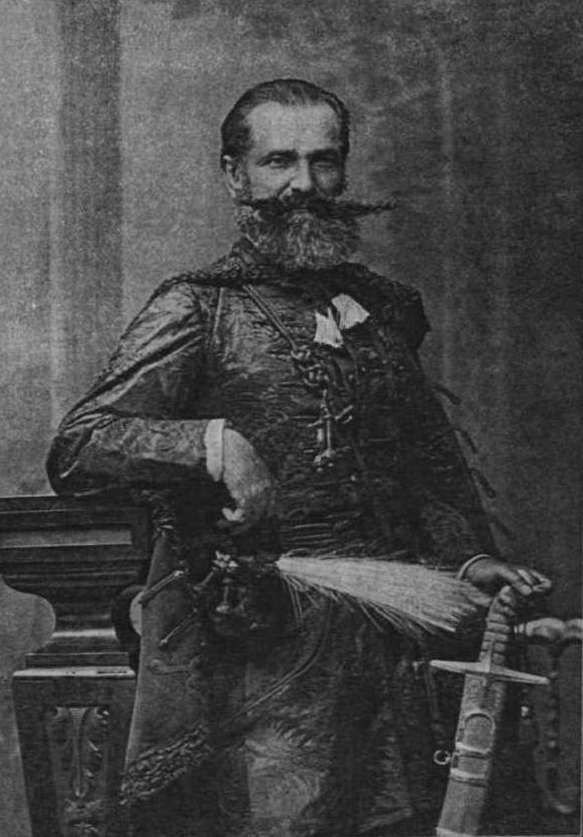
Photo of Baron Balázs Orbán in The Sunday Newspaper, 1890/17th edition

He completed his schooling in Székelyudvarhely, first to a catholic then to a reformed grammar school as he could learn ancient Greek, Math, and History there, but he had left his homeland already in the summer of 1846. He and his family traveled to Constantinople to receive the heritage of his grandmother, Mária Foresti, who was descended from Venice and probably poisoned by Muslims. After long lawsuits he only received a small part of the fabulous fortune, so he learned the craft of watchmaking. Taking the opportunity, he traveled around the Near East. He had got to Egypt, where he climbed the pyramids, in the Holy Land visited the biblical places, met a lot of Hungarian and Romanian “Bedouin” from Transylvania, who escaped the military conscription, traveled around Asia Minor, studied the ancient Greek cultural remains, wrote admiringly about the revolution of the Greek people. He later published his Eastern adventures in six volumes, entitled Traveling in the East. As a result of what he has seen here, he had adopted strongly anti-clerical views, which he has voiced in several of his works.

He learned about the Hungarian Revolution of 1848 from a Western newspaper in Athens. He left the Ottoman capital with a military unit of volunteers but learned of the fall of the War of Independence in Vidin. He then helped the Hungarian emigrants with accommodation and work. It was a decisive experience of his later life that he was in the surroundings of Kossuth. He could not return home, because he was considered as an enemy by the Habsburg imperial authorities. He traveled to London, where he met Petőfi's friend, Sándor Teleki. He was greatly influenced by Victor Hugo, who migrated to Jersey and then to Guernsey, who said that “I could overthrow The Empire of Napoleon the 3rd with 200 Balázs Orbáns”. He could not return home until 1859. He used the years of absolutism, the period of relief, to travel around the Székely Land. He visited all the settlements, castle ruins, and natural rarities. He made notes and photographs diligently. As a result of his work, between 1868 and 1873 he published his main work in six volumes, entitled The description of the Székely Land in historical, archaeological, natural and ethnographic terms.

From 1872 to the end of his life he was a member of the Hungarian Parliament, and with the independence program of 1848, he belonged to the opposition. He published his speeches in six volumes as well. Meanwhile, he worked on Szejkefürdő that he developed, writing historical studies and publishing numerous newspaper articles in opposition papers.

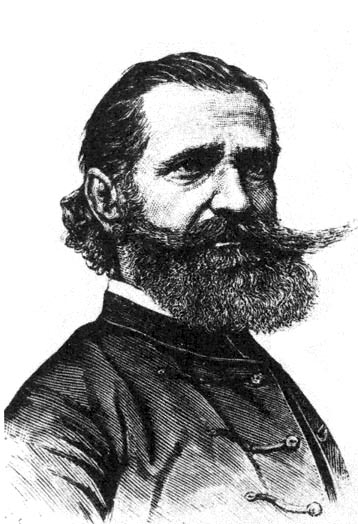
Portrait of Balázs Orbán

His life was adventurous and romantic, like a hero of Mór Jókai. But this novel was not written, although Mór Jókai first heard the base stories of the Székely novels from him. At the same time, there were downsides to his life as well. He was blackballed by Székelys at the time of the elections, they did not always agree with the “Bone Baron”. As a late acknowledgment, it was not until 1888 that he became a correspondent member of the Hungarian Academy of Sciences. He died without any descendants.

== Membership ==
- Kemény Zsigmond Society

== Legacy ==
He made his only heirs the Hungarians, and more specifically the Székely people, but there were long lawsuits over his legacy. At his funeral was decided that he deserves a statue, but it had to wait more than a century until 1995. According to his will, he was buried in Szejkefürdő. A row of Székely gates was put up in front of his grave, the last of which was his.

In Székelykeresztúr a school, in Székelyudvarhely a school and a photography club are named after him. The Council of Hargita (Harghita), Kovászna (Covasna) and Maros (Mureş) County established the Balázs Orbán Prize in 2011, which is awarded to individuals who have earned indelible merits in creating a unified image of Székely Land and modernizing it based on the specific traditions of the region.

Balázs Orbán Cave is the name of one of the caves of the Varghis Gorge Nature Reserve.

== Major works ==
- Travel in the East. Cluj Napoca, 1861, Six volumes
- Description of the Székely Land from the point of view of history, archaeology, geography and folklore. Pest, 1868–73. Six volumes
- Marosvásárhely royal city description. Pest, 1870 (Print from Volume IV of the Székely Land with 3 independent and 10 text pictures)
- Description of Toroczkó and its valley in terms of archaeology, geography and folklore. Pest, 1871 (Print from Volume V of the Székely Land, 5 independent and 9 text pictures)
- Brasov custom free royal city description in historical, archaeological and geographic terms. Pest, 1873 (Print from Volume VI of the Székely Land with 3 separate and 16 text images)
- A description of the ten Hungarian villages of Barczaság, from historical and archaeological point of view. Pest, 1873 (Print from Volume VI of the Szeklerland with 3 individual and 14 text images)
- Parliamentary speeches by Balázs Orbán from 1871 to 1884. Pest, 1875–84. Five booklets. (Print from the Parliamentary Journal)
- The fairy world of the East or Sultan Saif Züliázán. Arabic legend. Translated after Ali-bey. Kolozsvár (Cluj Napoca). Two parts in a single volume (4 stone prints)
- Hungarian folklore collection. (New journal III.) The Kisfaludy Society's assignment and is edited and published by them. Collection of János Kriza, Orbán Balázs, Benedek Elek and Jób Sebesi in Székely Land. Kolozsvár (Cluj Napoca), 1882
- About the origins and institutions of the Székelys. Kolozsvár (Cluj-Napoca), 1888 (Dissertations on History. XIII. 9).

== Ancestry ==
Balázs Orbán's family tree

Baron Balázs Orbán (Lengyelfalva, 3 February 1829– Budapest, 19 April 1890) author, ethnographic collector	Father: János Orbán, Baron of Lengyelfalva (Kassamindszent, 1779–24 August 1871 Lengyelfalva,) hussar Colonel	Paternal grandfather: Baron Pál Orbán (1751–1829) army major	Paternal great-grandfather: Baron Elek Orbán (Lengyelfalva, 1703– Harasztos, 1753) főkirálybiró
Baron Balázs Orbán (Lengyelfalva, 3 February 1829– Budapest, 19 April 1890) author, ethnographic collector	Father: János Orbán, Baron of Lengyelfalva (Kassamindszent, 1779–24 August 1871 Lengyelfalva,) hussar Colonel	Paternal grandfather: Baron Pál Orbán (1751–1829) army major	Paternal great-grandmother: Krisztina Olasz von Bencenc
Baron Balázs Orbán (Lengyelfalva, 3 February 1829– Budapest, 19 April 1890) author, ethnographic collector	Father: János Orbán, Baron of Lengyelfalva (Kassamindszent, 1779–24 August 1871 Lengyelfalva,) hussar Colonel	Paternal grandmother: gr. cserneki és tarkői Dessewffy Klára	Paternal great-grandfather: Baron István Dessewffy deputy lieutenant
Baron Balázs Orbán (Lengyelfalva, 3 February 1829– Budapest, 19 April 1890) author, ethnographic collector	Father: János Orbán, Baron of Lengyelfalva (Kassamindszent, 1779–24 August 1871 Lengyelfalva,) hussar Colonel	Paternal grandmother: gr. cserneki és tarkői Dessewffy Klára	Paternal great-grandmother: gecsei Olasz Júlia
Baron Balázs Orbán (Lengyelfalva, 3 February 1829– Budapest, 19 April 1890) author, ethnographic collector	Mother: Knechtel Eugénia (Constantinople, 1810– Szejkefürdő, 12 December 1883)	Maternal grandfather: János Knechtel mining expert	Maternal great-grandfather: no data
Baron Balázs Orbán (Lengyelfalva, 3 February 1829– Budapest, 19 April 1890) author, ethnographic collector	Mother: Knechtel Eugénia (Constantinople, 1810– Szejkefürdő, 12 December 1883)	Maternal grandfather: János Knechtel mining expert	Maternal great-grandmother: no data
Baron Balázs Orbán (Lengyelfalva, 3 February 1829– Budapest, 19 April 1890) author, ethnographic collector	Mother: Knechtel Eugénia (Constantinople, 1810– Szejkefürdő, 12 December 1883)	Maternal grandmother: Mária Foresti	Maternal great-grandfather: no data
Baron Balázs Orbán (Lengyelfalva, 3 February 1829– Budapest, 19 April 1890) author, ethnographic collector	Mother: Knechtel Eugénia (Constantinople, 1810– Szejkefürdő, 12 December 1883)	Maternal grandmother: Mária Foresti	Maternal great-grandmother: no data

== Gallery ==
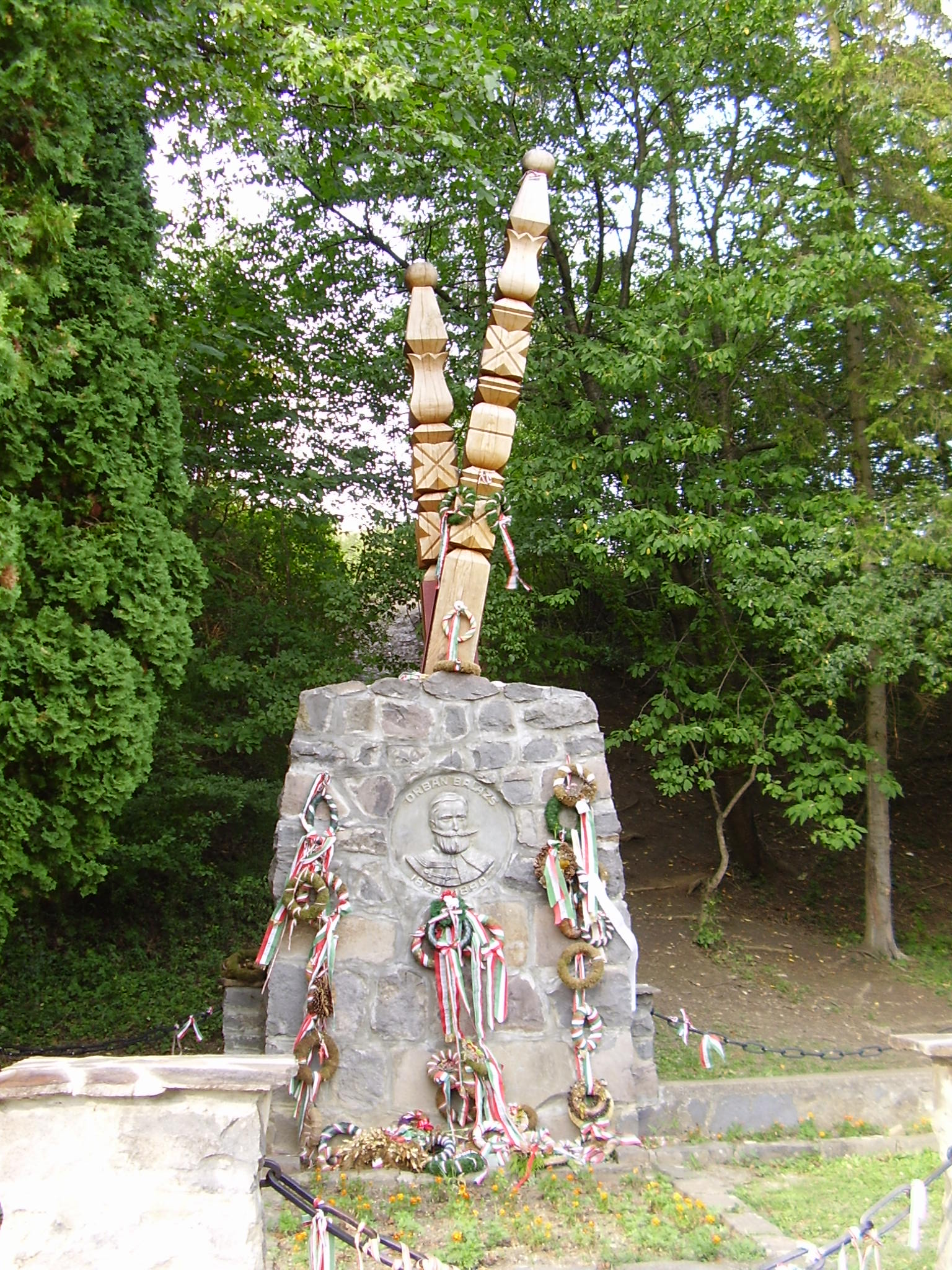
Balázs Orbán's honorary monument at his grave

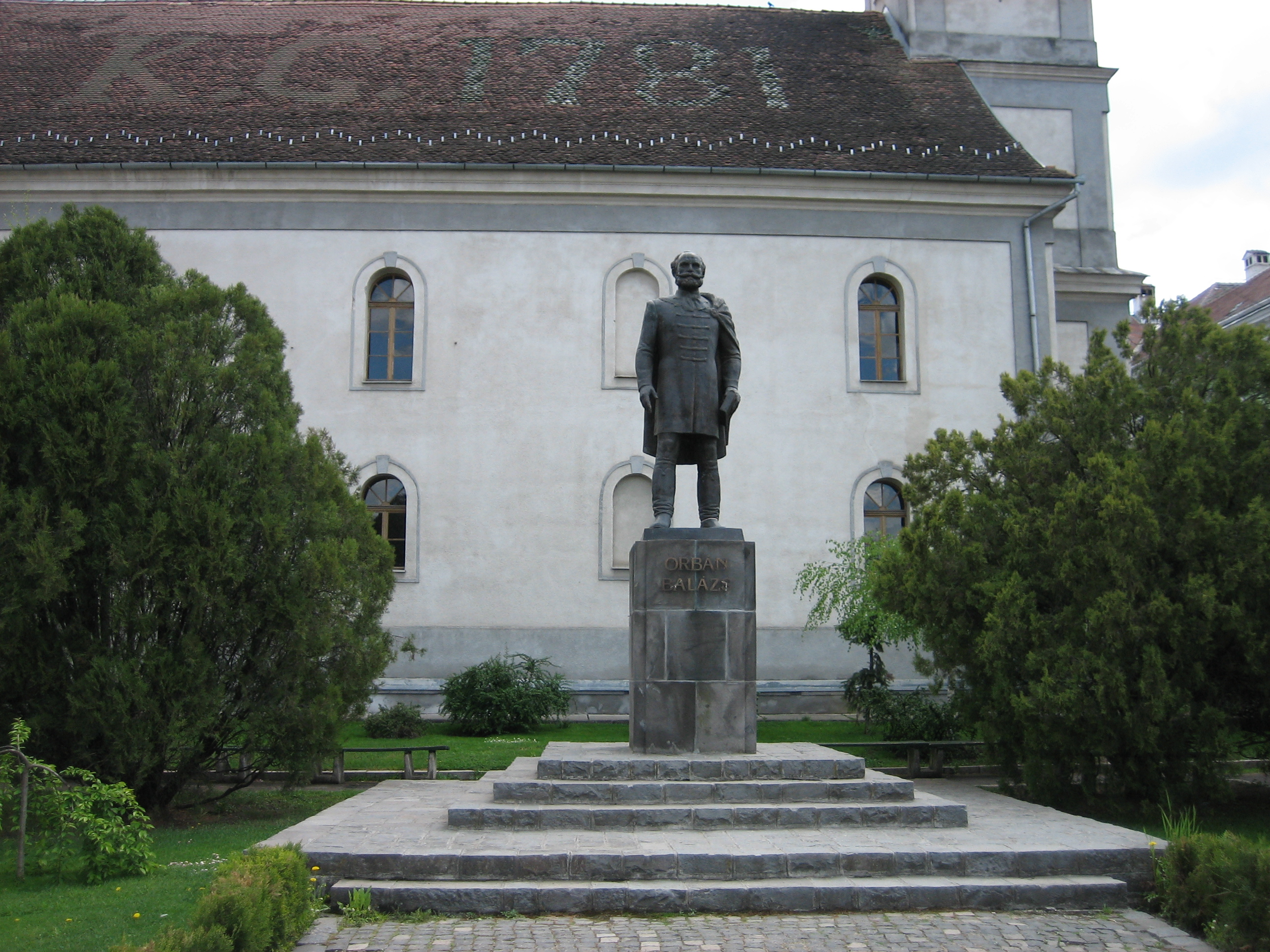
The statue of Orbán Balázs in Székelyudvarhely (Odorheiu Secuiesc)

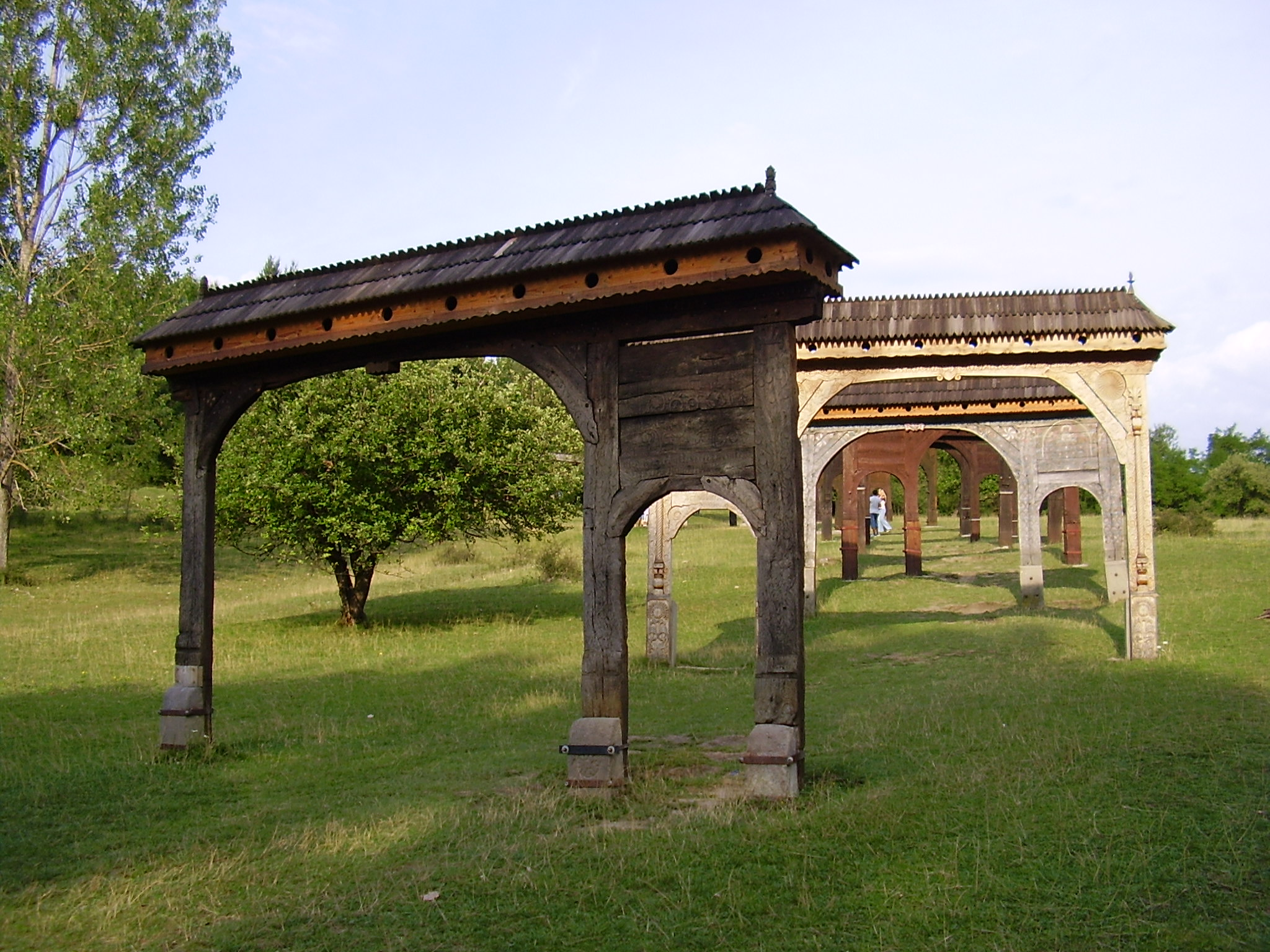
Szekler gates guide us on the path to his grave

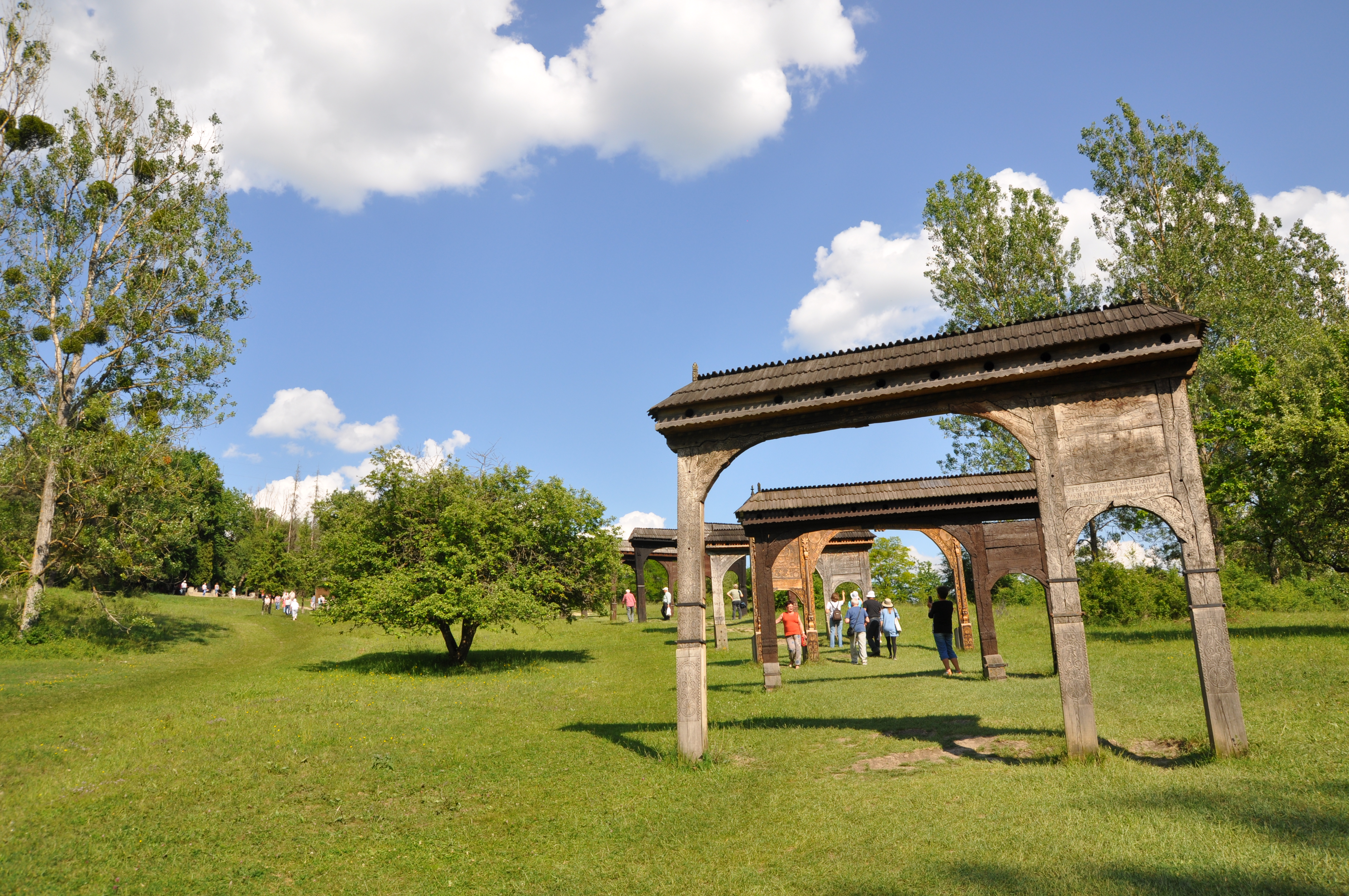
Székely gates on the path to his grave

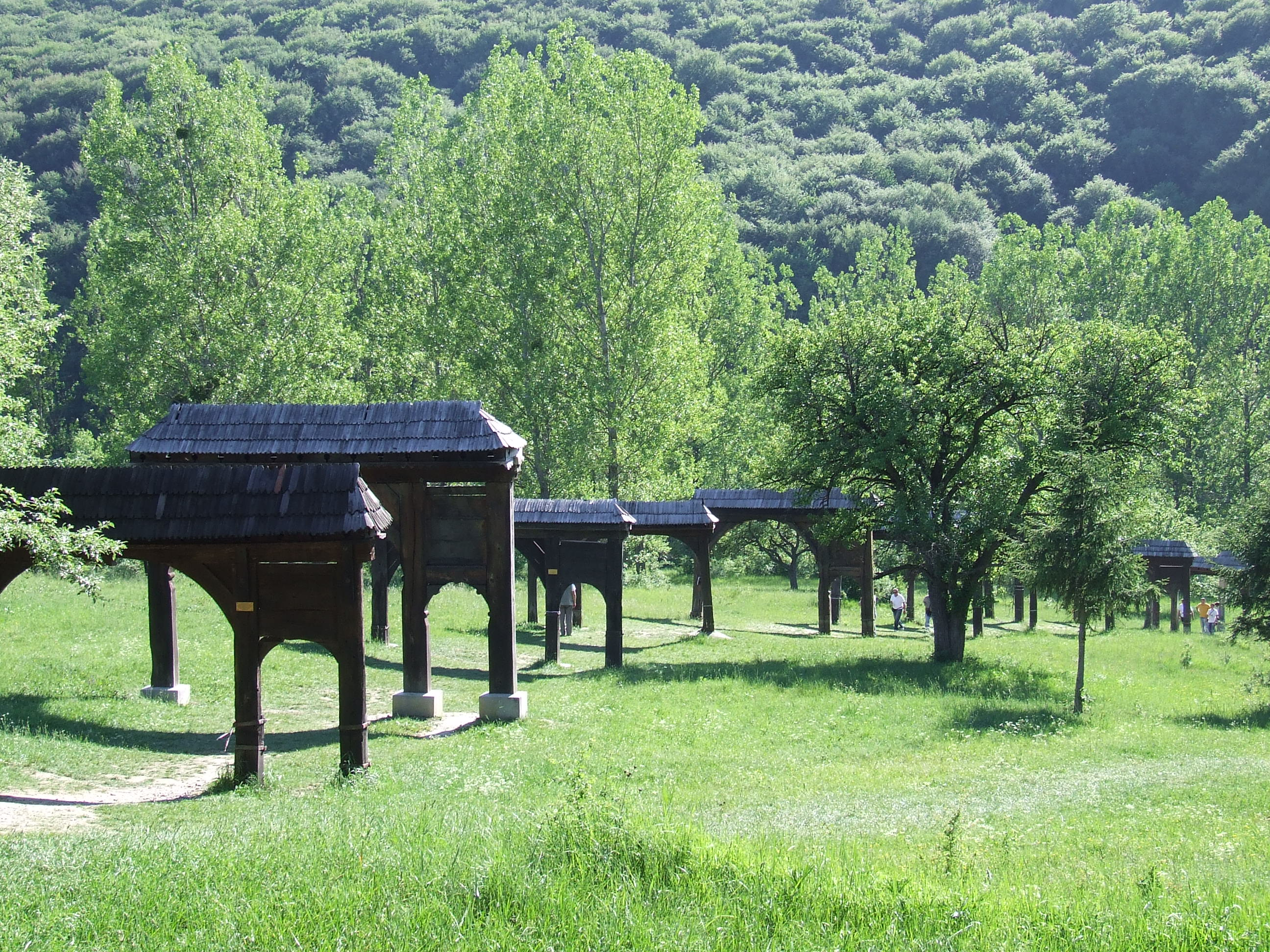
Szekler gates on the path to his eternal resting place

== Sources ==
1. familysearch.org Balázs Orbán's obituary
2. familysearch.org János Orbán's obituary
3. familysearch.org Eugénia Knechtel Orbán Jánosné's obituary
4. 120 - Hungarian Chancellery Archives - Acta miscellanea - F. 9 - Orbán
5. Péter Balogh: Székely Lives. (Accessed: 19 April 2015)
6. Imre Mikó: Balázs Orbán, the lover of the Székely Land. Korunk, July 1968. (Accessed: 19 April 2015)
7. The Balázs Orbán Awards were handed over. (Accessed: 9 April 2012)
8. Website of Vargyas Pass Nature Reserve. [archived on 11 October 2010 from the original]. (Accessed: 9 April 2012)
9. János József Gudenus: The Nobility of Hungary 20th Century Genealogy from the letter K to O, Tellér Publishing House, Budapest, 1993, 416–418. o. ISBN 963-817-800-0

== Further information ==
- Memory of Balázs Orbán, Budapest Dávid Ferenc Association, Budapest, 1940
- Károly Kós: Balázs Orbán, ethnographer, Scientific Publisher, Cluj-Napoca, 1957
- Balázs Orbán: The City of Turda and its surroundings (duplicate edition), Helikon Publisher, Budapest, 1984, ISBN 9632079000
- Balázs Orbán: The City of Turda and its Surroundings, Europe Publisher, Budapest, 1986, ISBN 9630739534
- Balázs Orbán: Székely Land and Transylvania, CD-ROM, Arcanum, Budapest, 2001, ISBN 9639374148
- Balázs Orbán: The description of the Székely Land from the point of view of history, archeology, natural history and folklore (duplicate edition), Babits Publisher, Szekszárd, 2002, ISBN 9639272779
- Description of the Székely Land at MEK
- Turkish writings by Balázs Orbán on the Terebess Asia E-Library
- Dániel Bolgár: Orientalism of Balázs Orbán, video presentation at Adatbank Café
- Educational film about Balázs Orbán
- Photographs of Balázs Orbán's grave
