= Târnava Mare =

Târnava Mare Nagy-Küküllő, Große Kokel
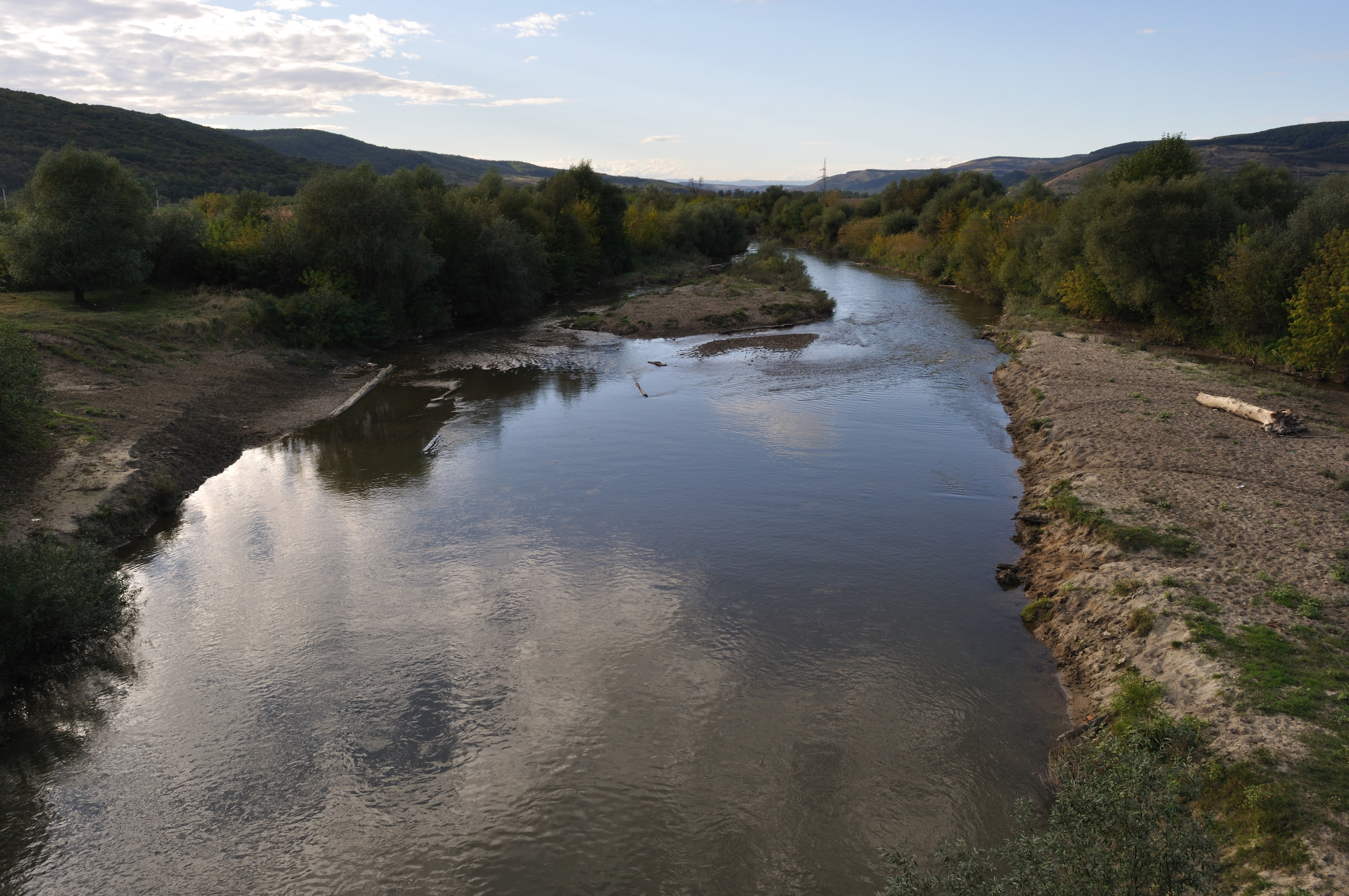
- The Târnava Mare near Blaj

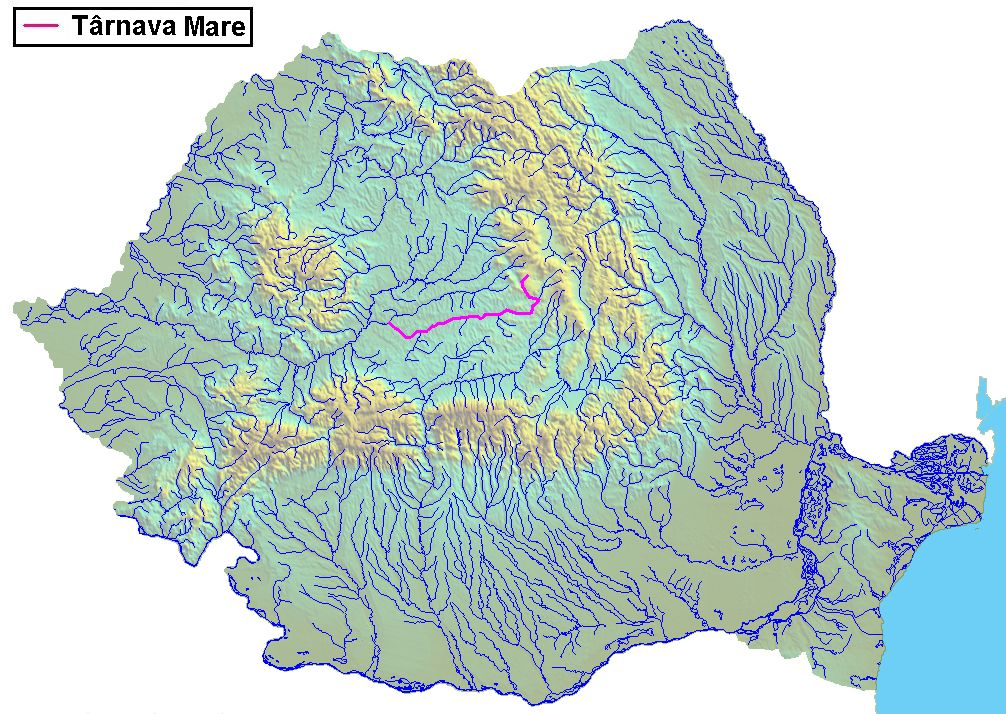

Location
- Country: Romania
- Counties: Harghita, Mureș, Sibiu, Alba
- Towns: Odorheiu Secuiesc, Sighișoara, Mediaș, Blaj

Physical characteristics
- Source: Gurghiu Mountains
  - elevation: 1,455 m (4,774 ft)
- Mouth: Târnava
  - location: Blaj
  - coordinates: 46°10′16″N 23°53′31″E
- Length: 223 km (139 mi)
- Basin size: 3,666 km^{2} (1,415 sq mi)
- Discharge
  - location: *
  - average: 14.5 m^{3}/s (510 cu ft/s)

Basin features
- Progression: Târnava→ Mureș→ Tisza→ Danube→ Black Sea
- Tributaries
  - left: Șaeș, Vișa
  - right: Feernic

The Târnava Mare ("Great Târnava"; Hungarian: Nagy-Küküllő; German: Große Kokel) is a river in Romania. Its total length is 223 km (139 mi) and its basin size is 3,666 km^{2} (1,415 sq mi). Its source is in the Eastern Carpathian Mountains, near the sources of the Mureș and Olt in Harghita County. It flows through the Romanian counties of Harghita, Mureș, Sibiu, and Alba. The cities of Odorheiu Secuiesc, Sighișoara, and Mediaș lie on the Târnava Mare. It joins the Târnava Mică in Blaj, forming the Târnava.

== Towns and villages ==
The following towns and villages are situated along the river Târnava Mare, from source to mouth: Sub Cetate, Zetea, Brădești, Odorheiu Secuiesc, Feliceni, Mugeni, Porumbeni, Cristuru Secuiesc, Secuieni, Sighișoara, Daneș, Dumbrăveni, Dârlos, Mediaș, Copșa Mică, Micăsasa, Valea Lungă, Blaj.

== Tributaries ==
The following rivers are tributaries to the river Târnava Mare (from source to mouth):

Left: Chiuveș, Vărșag, Șicasău, Pârâul Băutor, Deșag, Brădești, Gorom, Hodoș, Mugeni, Pârâul Caprelor, Scroafa, Pârâul Cărbunarilor, Daia, Șapartoc, Valea Dracului, Vâlcăndorf, Șaeș, Criș, Laslea, Valchid, Biertan, Ațel, Valea Mare, Buzd, Moșna, Ighiș, Vorumloc, Vișa, Șeica, Soroștin, Cenade, Spătac, Veza

Right: Tartod, Creanga Mică, Pârâul Rece, Senced, Busniac, Pârâul Sărat, Cireșeni, Beta, Tăietura, Fâneața Îngustă, Feernic, Goagiu, Eliseni, Rogoz, Valea Morii, Prod, Fântâna Veteului, Giacăș, Șmig, Curciu, Păucea, Chesler, Valea Lungă

== Târnava Mare SCI ==
The dry grassland habitat beside the river is now part of a (SCI) Site of Community Importance.
