= Eliseni =

- Location within Romania

Location
- Country: Romania
- Counties: Harghita, Mureș
- Villages: Săcel, Eliseni

Physical characteristics
- Mouth: Târnava Mare
  - location: Șoard
  - coordinates: 46.2515°N 24.9090°E
- Length: 14 km (8.7 mi)
- Basin size: 85 km^{2} (33 sq mi)

Basin features
- Progression: Târnava Mare→ Târnava→ Mureș→ Tisza→ Danube→ Black Sea
- Tributaries
  - left: Șoimușul Mare, Șoimușul Mic
  - right: Uilac

The Eliseni is a right tributary of the river Târnava Mare in Romania. It discharges into the Târnava Mare in Șoard. Its length is 14 km (8.7 mi) and its basin size is 85 km^{2} (33 sq mi).
