= Pârâul Băutor =

- Location within Romania

Location
- Country: Romania
- Counties: Harghita County
- Villages: Izvoare

Physical characteristics
- Mouth: Târnava Mare
  - coordinates: 46.4457°N 25.3862°E
- Length: 17 km (11 mi)
- Basin size: 71 km^{2} (27 sq mi)

Basin features
- Progression: Târnava Mare→ Târnava→ Mureș→ Tisza→ Danube→ Black Sea
- Tributaries
  - left: Șugo

The Pârâul Băutor (also: Ivo) is a left tributary of the river Târnava Mare, in Romania. It flows into the Târnava Mare in Sub Cetate. Its length is 17 km (11 mi) and its basin size is 71 km^{2} (27 sq mi).
