= Biertan (river) =

- Location within Romania

Location
- Country: Romania
- Counties: Sibiu County
- Villages: Biertan

Physical characteristics
- Mouth: Târnava Mare
  - location: Șaroș pe Târnave
  - coordinates: 46.2139°N 24.5347°E
- Length: 17 km (11 mi)
- Basin size: 58 km^{2} (22 sq mi)

Basin features
- Progression: Târnava Mare→ Târnava→ Mureș→ Tisza→ Danube→ Black Sea
- Tributaries
  - left: Richiș

The Biertan (Hungarian: Berethalom) is a left tributary of the river Târnava Mare in Romania. It discharges into the Târnava Mare in Șaroș pe Târnave near Dumbrăveni. Its length is 17 km (11 mi) and its basin size is 58 km^{2} (22 sq mi).
