= Spătac =

- Location within Romania

Location
- Country: Romania
- Counties: Alba County
- Villages: Cergău Mare, Spătac

Physical characteristics
- Mouth: Târnava Mare
  - location: Mănărade
  - coordinates: 46.1480°N 23.9531°E
- Length: 11 km (6.8 mi)
- Basin size: 44 km^{2} (17 sq mi)

Basin features
- Progression: Târnava Mare→ Târnava→ Mureș→ Tisza→ Danube→ Black Sea

The Spătac is a left tributary of the river Târnava Mare in Romania. It discharges into the Târnava Mare in the village Spătac. Its length is 11 km (6.8 mi) and its basin size is 44 km^{2} (17 sq mi).
