= Creanga Mică =

- Location within Romania

Location
- Country: Romania
- Counties: Harghita County

Physical characteristics
- Mouth: Târnava Mare
  - coordinates: 46.5101°N 25.3132°E
- Length: 15 km (9.3 mi)
- Basin size: 41 km^{2} (16 sq mi)

Basin features
- Progression: Târnava Mare→ Târnava→ Mureș→ Tisza→ Danube→ Black Sea

The Creanga Mică is a right tributary of the river Târnava Mare, in Romania. It discharges into the Târnava Mare near Vărșag. Its length is 15 km (9.3 mi) and its basin size is 41 km^{2} (16 sq mi).
