= Busniac =

Busniac Bosnyák
- Location within Romania

Location
- Country: Romania
- Counties: Harghita County
- Villages: Sâncrai, Odorheiu Secuiesc

Physical characteristics
- Mouth: Târnava Mare
  - location: Odorheiu Secuiesc
  - coordinates: 46.3218°N 25.3161°E
- Length: 13 km (8.1 mi)
- Basin size: 51 km^{2} (20 sq mi)

Basin features
- Progression: Târnava Mare→ Târnava→ Mureș→ Tisza→ Danube→ Black Sea

The Busniac (Hungarian: Bosnyák) is a right tributary of the river Târnava Mare in Romania. It discharges into the Târnava Mare in Odorheiu Secuiesc. Its length is 13 km (8.1 mi) and its basin size is 51 km^{2} (20 sq mi).
