= Valea Morii (Târnava Mare) =

Valea Morii Hetiur
- Location within Romania

Location
- Country: Romania
- Counties: Mureș County
- Villages: Hetiur, Seleuș

Physical characteristics
- Mouth: Târnava Mare
  - location: near Seleuș
  - coordinates: 46°13′51″N 24°41′18″E
- Length: 14 km (8.7 mi)
- Basin size: 35 km^{2} (14 sq mi)

Basin features
- Progression: Târnava Mare→ Târnava→ Mureș→ Tisza→ Danube→ Black Sea
- Tributaries
  - right: Seleuș

The Valea Morii (also: Hetiur) is a right tributary of the river Târnava Mare in Romania. It flows into the Târnava Mare near Seleuș. Its length is 14 km (8.7 mi) and its basin size is 35 km^{2} (14 sq mi).
