= Vorumloc =

- Location within Romania

Location
- Country: Romania
- Counties: Sibiu County
- Villages: Motiș, Valea Viilor, Copșa Mică

Physical characteristics
- Mouth: Târnava Mare
  - location: Copșa Mică
  - coordinates: 46.1205°N 24.2498°E
- Length: 14 km (8.7 mi)
- Basin size: 38 km^{2} (15 sq mi)

Basin features
- Progression: Târnava Mare→ Târnava→ Mureș→ Tisza→ Danube→ Black Sea

The Vorumloc (in its upper course also: Motiș) is a left tributary of the river Târnava Mare in Romania. It discharges into the Târnava Mare in Copșa Mică. Its length is 14 km (8.7 mi) and its basin size is 38 km^{2} (15 sq mi).
