= Șaeș =

Left tributary of the Târnava Mare river in Romania

- Location within Romania

Location
- Country: Romania
- Counties: Mureș County
- Villages: Daia, Apold, Șaeș, Sighișoara

Physical characteristics
- Mouth: Târnava Mare
  - location: Sighișoara
  - coordinates: 46.2239°N 24.7809°E
- Length: 34 km (21 mi)
- Basin size: 124 km^{2} (48 sq mi)

Basin features
- Progression: Târnava Mare→ Târnava→ Mureș→ Tisza→ Danube→ Black Sea

The Șaeș is a left tributary of the river Târnava Mare in Romania. It discharges into the Târnava Mare in the city Sighișoara. Its length is 34 km (21 mi) and its basin size is 124 km^{2} (48 sq mi).
