= Albești, Mureș =

Albești Fehéregyháza
- Commune
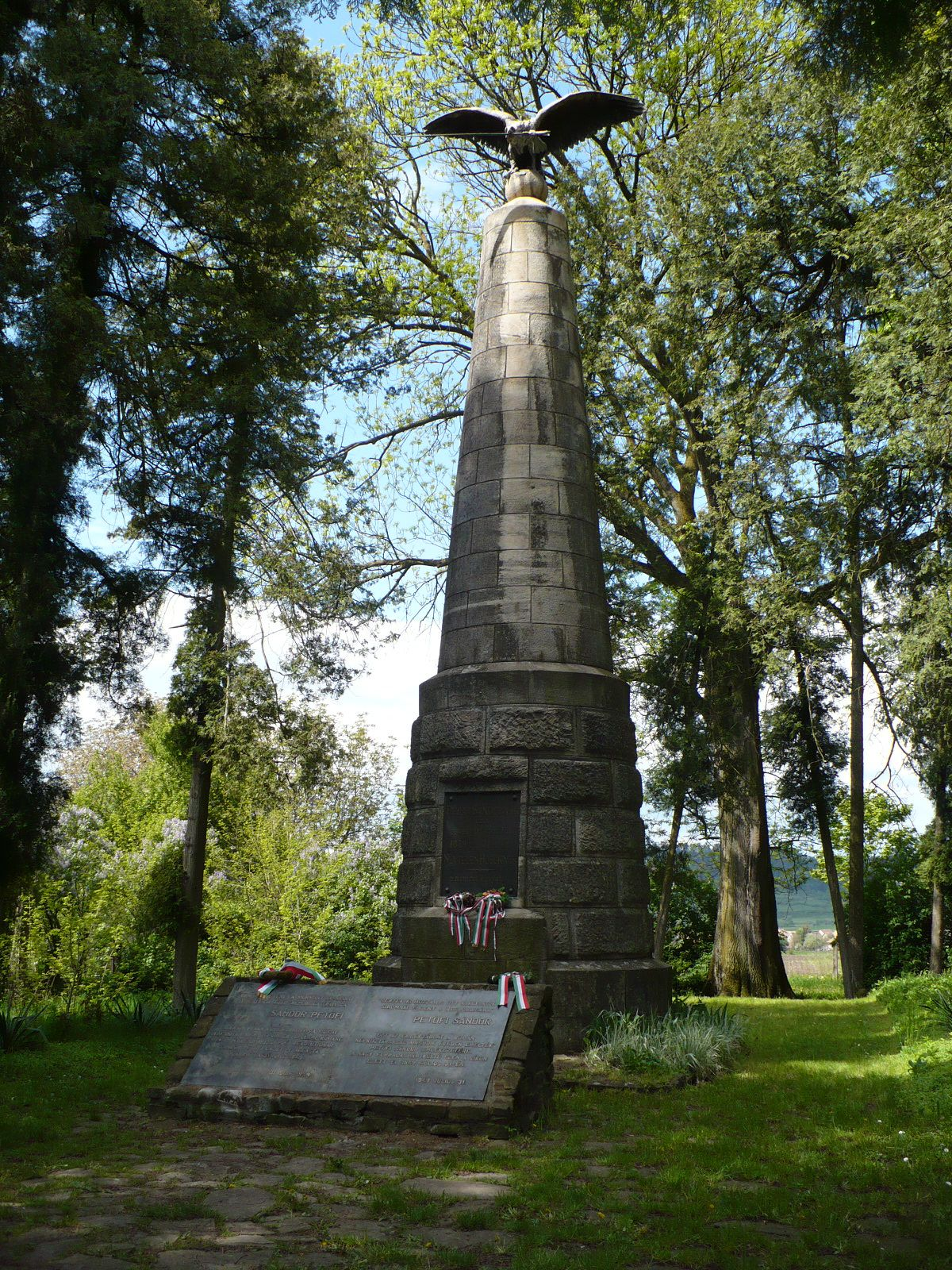
- Monument of the Battle of Segesvár of 1849 in the Sándor Petőfi Museum park

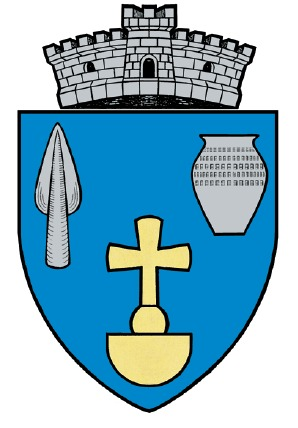
- Coat of arms

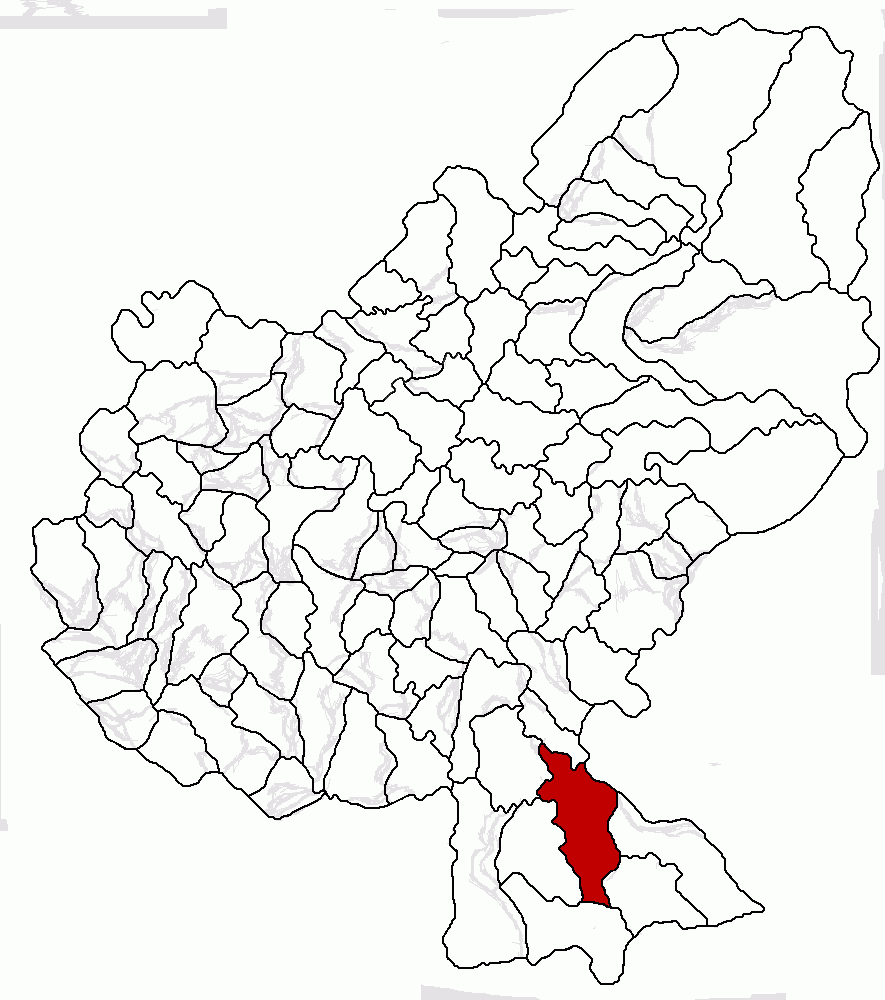
- Location in Mureș County

- Location in Romania
- Coordinates: commune 46°14′N 24°51′E
- Country: Romania
- County: Mureș
- Established: 1231 (first attested)
- Subdivisions: Albești, Bârlibășoaia, Boiu, Jacu, Șapartoc, Țopa, Valea Albeștiului, Valea Dăii, Valea Șapartocului

Government
  - Mayor (2020–2024): Nicolae Șovrea (PSD)
- Area: 82.7 km^{2} (31.9 sq mi)
- Elevation: 368 m (1,207 ft)
- Population (2021-12-01): 5,392
  - Density: 65.2/km^{2} (169/sq mi)
- Time zone: UTC+02:00 (EET)
  - Summer (DST): UTC+03:00 (EEST)
- Postal code: 547025
- Area code: (+40) 0265
- Vehicle reg.: MS
- Website: comunaalbesti.ro

Albești (until 1924 Ferihaz; Hungarian: Fehéregyháza, Hungarian pronunciation: [ˈfɛheːrɛɡihaːzɒ]; German: Weißkirch) is a commune in Mureș County, Transylvania, Romania. It is composed of nine villages: Albești, Bârlibășoaia (Barlabástanya), Boiu (Bún), Jacu (Oláhzsákod), Șapartoc (Sárpatak, "Muddy River"), Țopa (Alsóbún), Valea Albeștiului (Sárpataki út), Valea Dăii (Határpatak), and Valea Șapartocului (Sárpatakivölgy).

The route of the Via Transilvanica long-distance trail passes through the village of Șapartoc.

== Geography ==
The commune lies on the Transylvanian Plateau, on the banks of the river Târnava Mare. It is located in the southern part of Mureș County, 5 km (3.1 mi) east of Sighișoara, on the border with Harghita County.

== Transport ==
Albești is crossed by national road DN13, which connects Brașov to Sighișoara and Târgu Mureș, the county seat. The Albești train station serves the CFR Line 300 that runs from Bucharest to Cluj-Napoca.

== Demographics ==
At the 2021 census, the commune had a population of 5,392; of those, 65.52% were Romanians, 15.75% Hungarians, and 10.11% Roma.

== See also ==
- List of Hungarian exonyms (Mureș County)

== Gallery ==
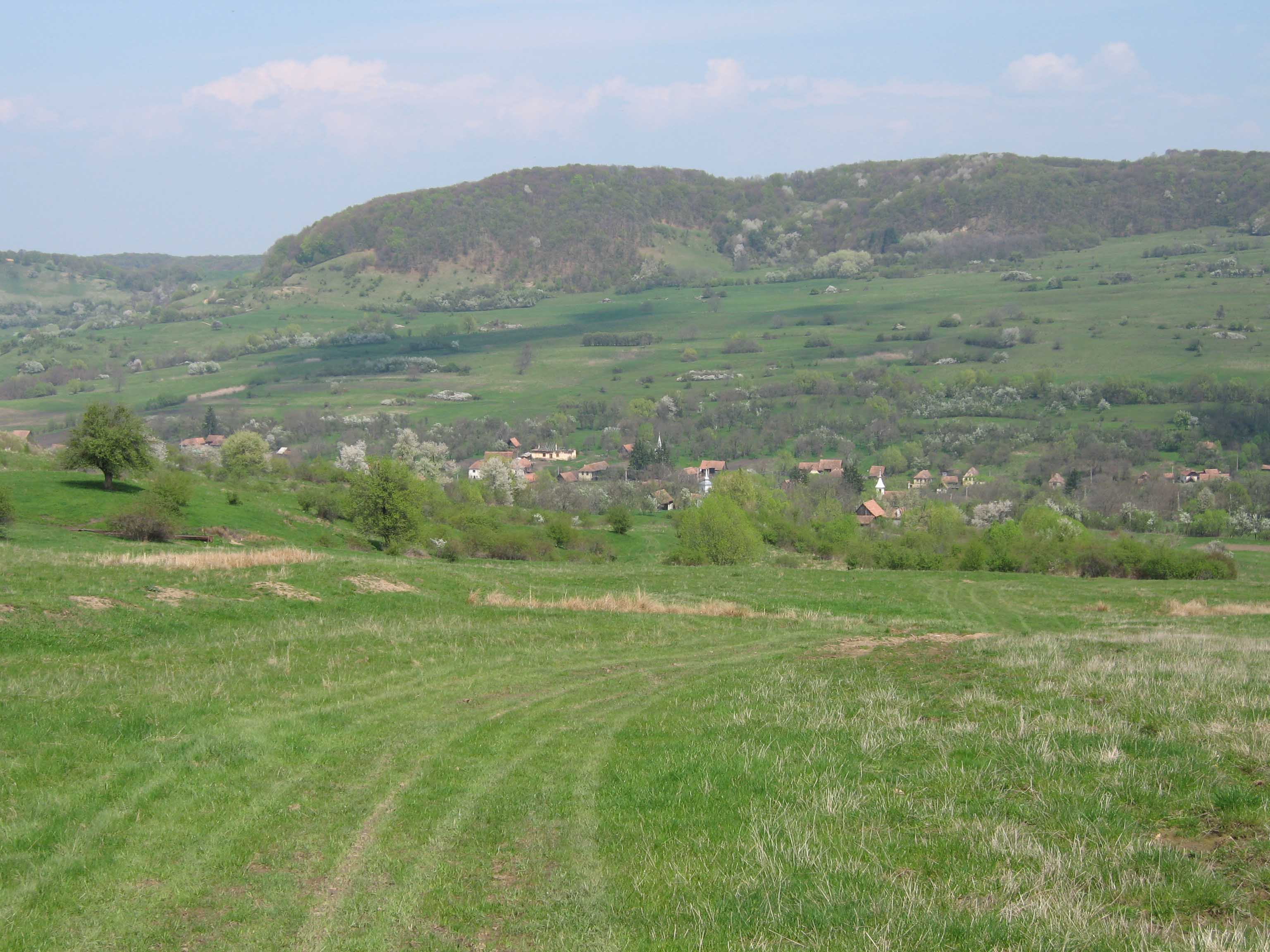
Șapartoc from the country path to Sighișoara

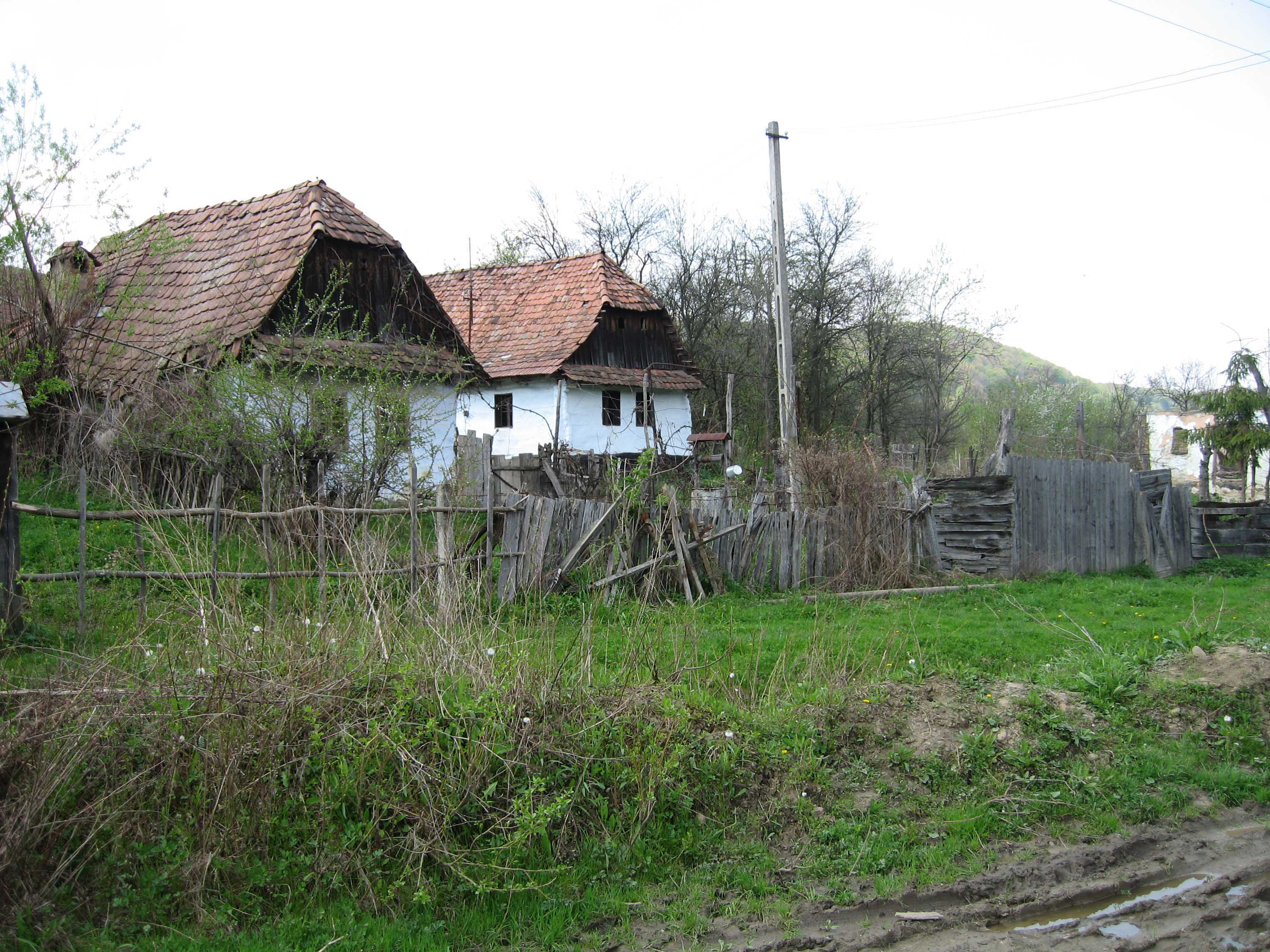
Typical Șapartoc homes

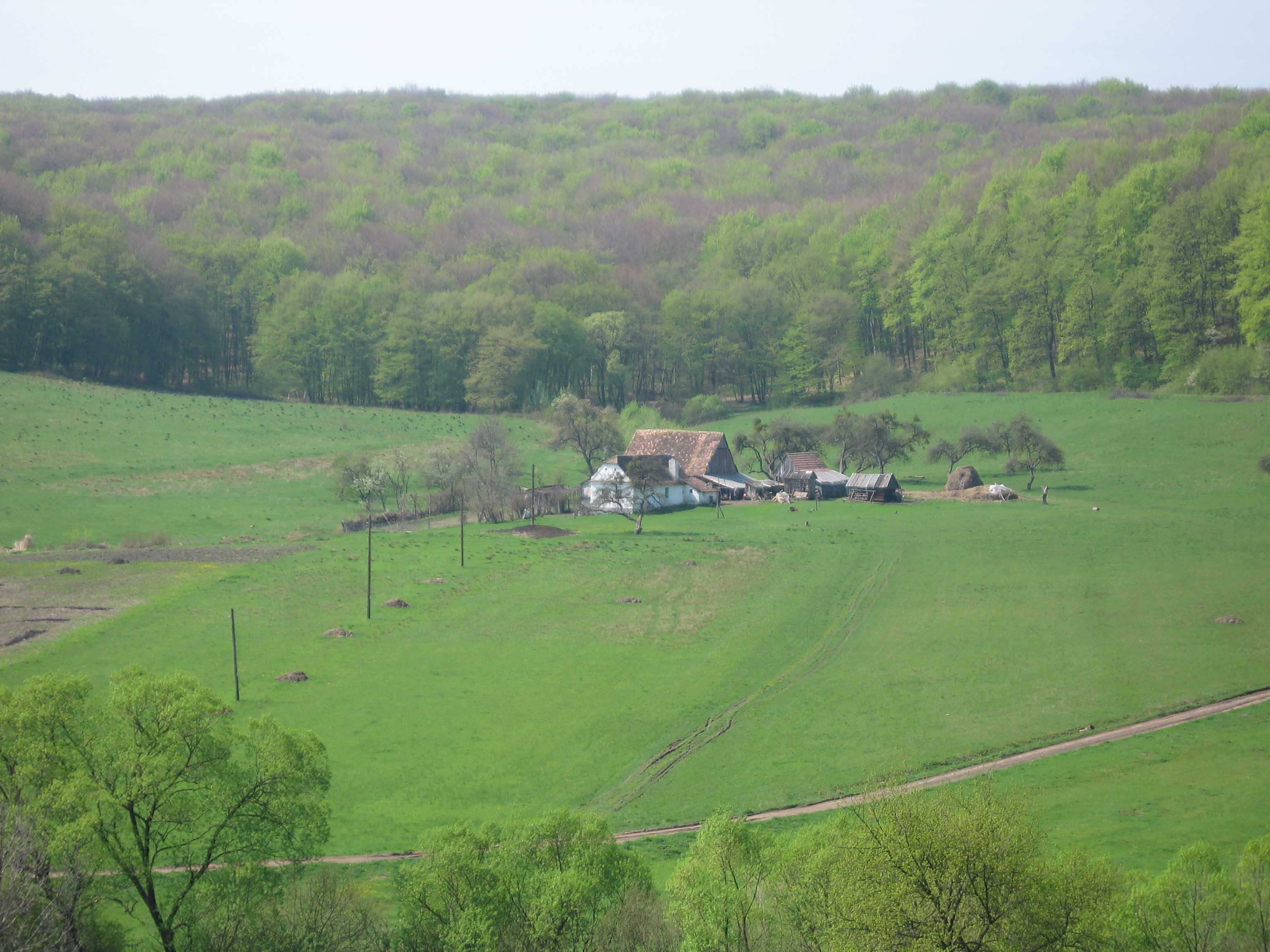
Traditional farmhouse near the Sighișoara–Șapartoc country path
