= Feliceni =

Feliceni Felsőboldogfalva
- Commune
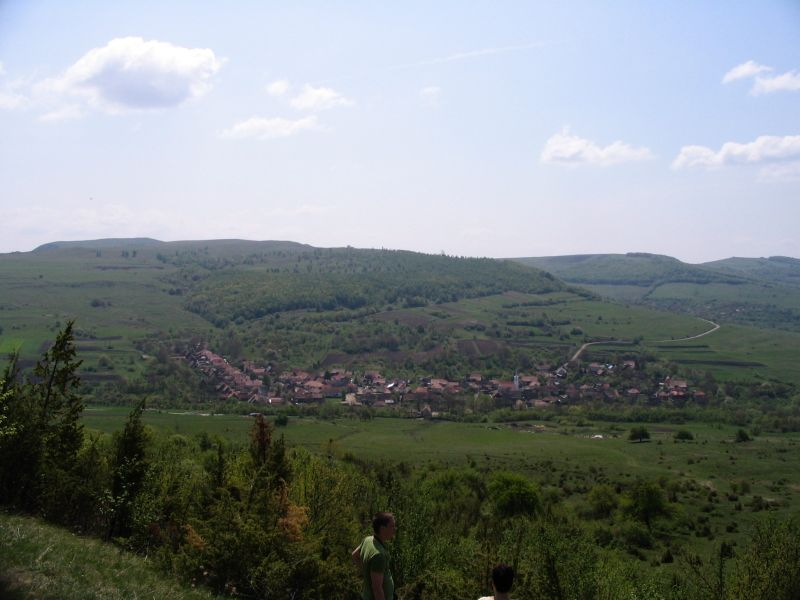
- View of Teleac village

- Coat of arms

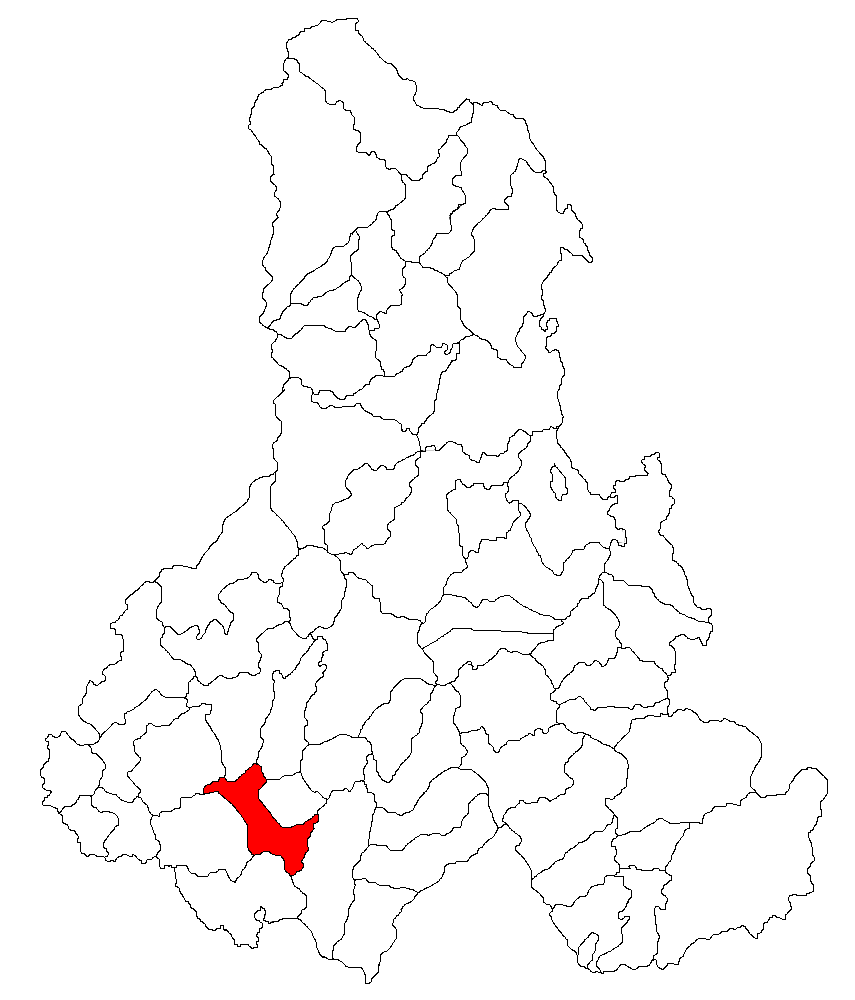
- Location in Harghita County

- Location in Romania
- Coordinates: 46°16′N 25°16′E
- Country: Romania
- County: Harghita

Government
  - Mayor (2020–2024): Levente Zsombori (Ind.)
- Area: 78.91 km^{2} (30.47 sq mi)
- Elevation: 601 m (1,972 ft)
- Population (2021-12-01): 3,448
  - Density: 43.70/km^{2} (113.2/sq mi)
- Time zone: UTC+02:00 (EET)
  - Summer (DST): UTC+03:00 (EEST)
- Postal code: 537297
- Area code: +(40) 266
- Vehicle reg.: HR
- Website: felsoboldogfalva.ro

Feliceni (Hungarian: Felsőboldogfalva, Hungarian pronunciation: [ˈfɛlʃøːboldoɡfɒlvɒ], meaning "Upper Village of the Blessed", referring to the Virgin Mary) is a commune in Harghita County, Romania, in the vicinity of Odorheiu Secuiesc. It forms part of the Székely Land, an ethno-cultural region in eastern Transylvania.

== Component villages ==
The commune is composed of eleven villages:

In Romanian	In Hungarian
Alexandrița	Sándortelke
Arvățeni	Árvátfalva
Cireșeni	Sükő
Feliceni	Felsőboldogfalva
Forțeni	Farcád
Hoghia	Hodgya
Oțeni	Ocfalva
Polonița	Székelylengyelfalva
Tăureni	Bikafalva
Teleac	Telekfalva
Văleni	Patakfalva

== History ==
The villages of the commune historically belonged to the Székely seat of Udvarhelyszék and from 1876 to Udvarhely County in the Kingdom of Hungary. In the immediate aftermath of World War I, during the Hungarian–Romanian War (1918–1919), these localities passed under Romanian administration. By the terms of the Treaty of Trianon of 1920, they became part of the Kingdom of Romania. During the interwar period, the commune fell within Odorhei County.

As a result of the Second Vienna Award of August 1940, Feliceni, together with the rest of Northern Transylvania, became part of Hungary until the Romanian Army and the Red Army entered the area in September–October 1944. The territory of Northern Transylvania remained under Soviet military administration until March 9, 1945, after which it became again part of Romania. Between 1952 and 1960, the villages formed part of the Hungarian Autonomous Province, then, of the Mureș-Hungarian Autonomous Province until it was abolished in 1968. Since then, the commune has been part of Harghita County.

== Demographics ==
At the 2011 census, the commune had a population of 3,297; out of them, 97% were Hungarians, 0.9% were Romanians, and 0.7% were Roma. At the 2021 census, Feliceni had 3,448 inhabitants, of which 87.88% were Hungarians and 3.25% Romanians.

== Polonița ==
Polonița (Hungarian: Székelylengyelfalva, or colloquially Lengyelfalva, Hungarian pronunciation: [seːkɛjlɛnɟɛlfɒlvɒ], meaning "Poles' village") is located along the Polonița (Lengyelfalvi) Creek in a narrow valley. It had 319 inhabitants in 2002 (down from 503 in 1910), of whom 315 were Hungarians.

The village was first mentioned in 1505 as Lengenfalwa when a certain Balthasar was elected "seat judge" at Udvarhely. In 1533, the name was recorded as Lengyelfalva. In 1899, the ethnonym Székely was added to the Hungarian place-name in order to distinguish the locality from another Lengyelfalva (now: Košická Polianka) of the historical Kingdom of Hungary. The Romanian name derives from the Hungarian one and was originally used as Lenghelfalău which was later Romanianized by translation. Its Roman Catholic church was built in 1802, replacing the medieval church.

== Natives ==
- Balázs Orbán (1829–1890), Hungarian author, ethnographic collector, and parliamentarian
