= Dârlos =

- Commune
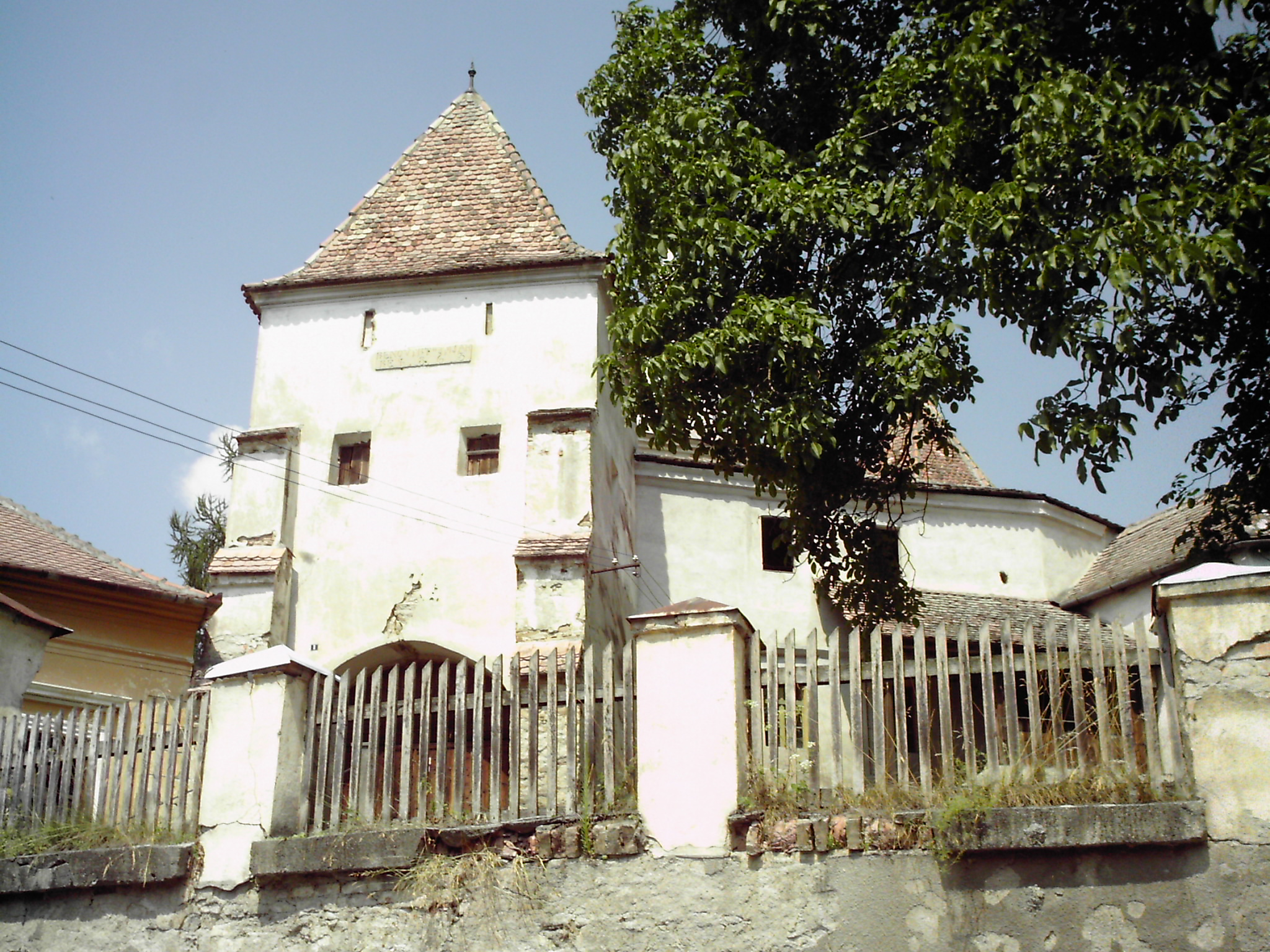
- Fortified church of Curciu

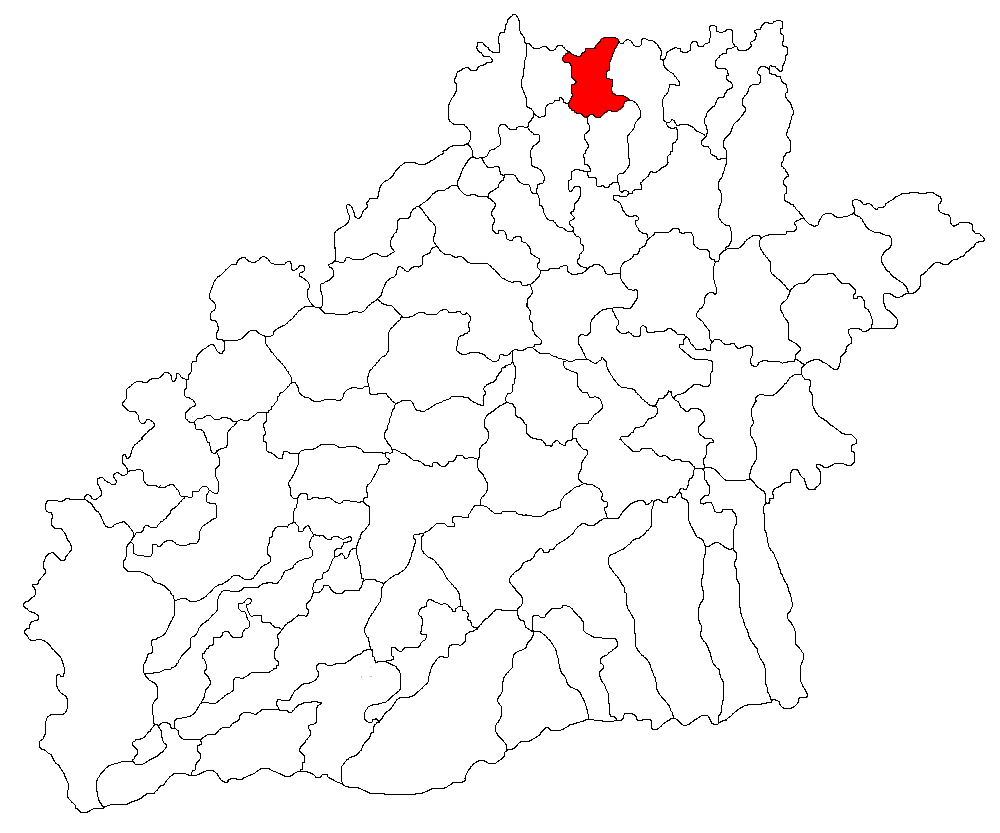
- Location in Sibiu County

- Location in Romania
- Coordinates: 46°11′N 24°24′E
- Country: Romania
- County: Sibiu

Government
  - Mayor (2020–2024): Ioan Lupu (PNL)
- Area: 40.1 km^{2} (15.5 sq mi)
- Elevation: 320 m (1,050 ft)
- Population (2021-12-01): 2,615
  - Density: 65.2/km^{2} (169/sq mi)
- Time zone: UTC+02:00 (EET)
  - Summer (DST): UTC+03:00 (EEST)
- Postal code: 557090
- Area code: (+40) 02 69
- Vehicle reg.: SB
- Website: www.primariadarlos.ro

Dârlos (German: Durles; Hungarian: Darlac) is a commune located in Sibiu County, Transylvania, Romania. It is composed of three villages: Curciu (Kirtsch; Küküllőkőrös), Dârlos, and Valea Lungă (Hosszúpatak).

The commune is located on the right bank of the Târnava Mare River, in the northeastern part of the county, 6 km (3.7 mi) from Mediaș.

At the 2011 census, Dârlos had a population of 2,820, of which 75.5% were Romanians, 19.1% Roma, 4.4% Hungarians, and 0.9% Germans (more specifically Transylvanian Saxons). At the 2021 census, the population had decreased to 2,615, of which 79.12% were Romanians, 11.51% Roma, and 1.38% Hungarians.

== Natives ==
- Ilarie Chendi (1871–1913), literary critic
