= Daneș =

- Commune
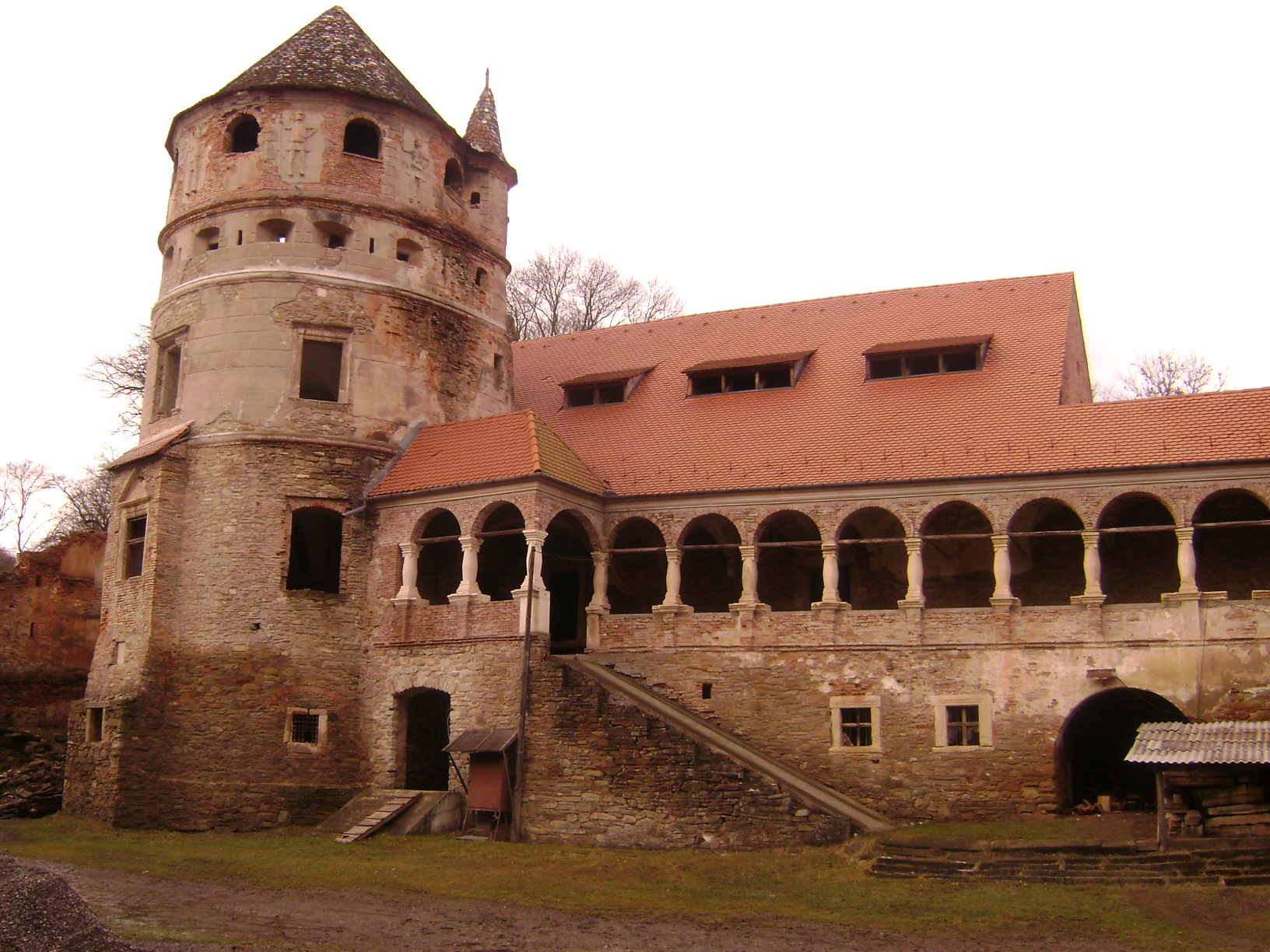
- Bethlen Castle in Criș

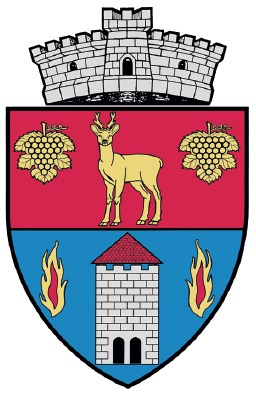
- Coat of arms

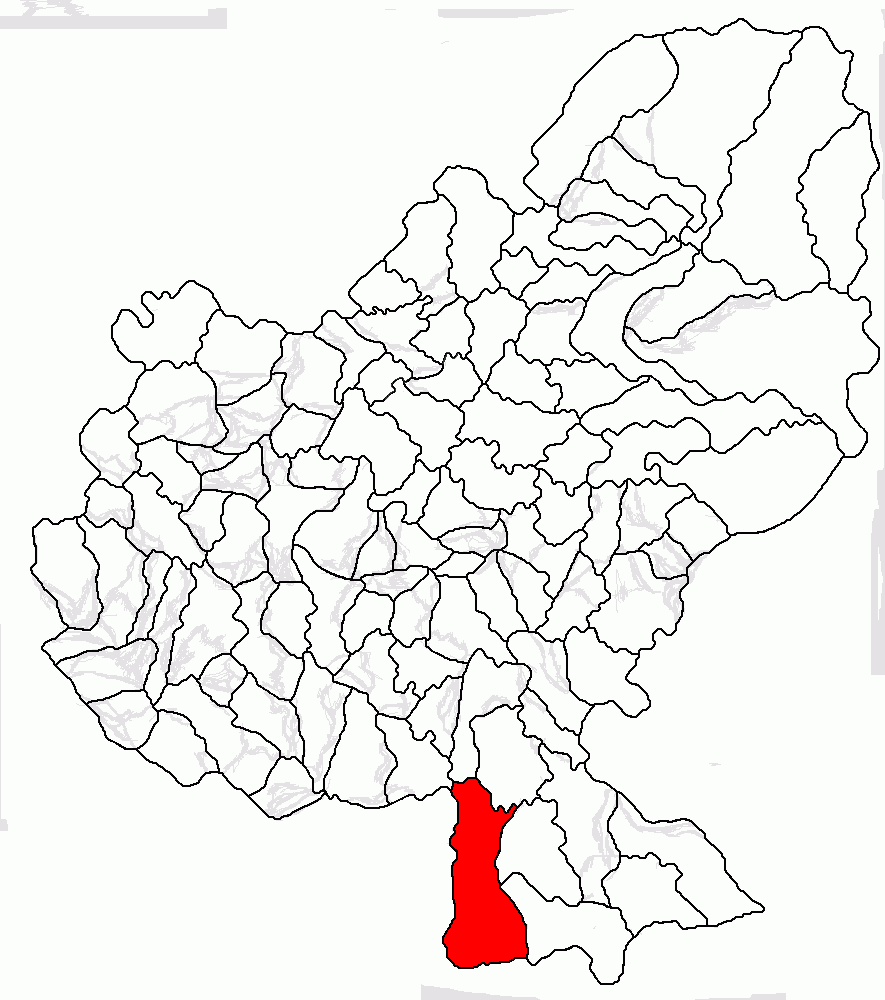
- Location in Mureș County

- Location in Romania
- Coordinates: 46°13′N 24°42′E
- Country: Romania
- County: Mureș

Government
  - Mayor (2024–2028): Valeriu Hundorfean (PSD)
- Area: 114.72 km^{2} (44.29 sq mi)
- Elevation: 353 m (1,158 ft)
- Population (2021-12-01): 4,743
  - Density: 41.34/km^{2} (107.1/sq mi)
- Time zone: UTC+02:00 (EET)
  - Summer (DST): UTC+03:00 (EEST)
- Postal code: 557200
- Area code: (+40) 0265
- Vehicle reg.: MS
- Website: primariadanes.ro

Daneș (Hungarian: Dános, Hungarian pronunciation: [daːnoʃ]; German: Dunesdorf) is a commune in Mureș County, Transylvania, Romania, near Sighișoara. It is composed of four villages: Criș (Keresd; Kreisch), Daneș, Seleuș (Keménynagyszőlős; Großalisch), and Stejărenii (Bese; Beșa until 1960).

The commune is situated on the Transylvanian Plateau, on the banks of the river Târnava Mare. It is located in the southern part of Mureș County, 8 km (5 mi) east of Sighișoara and 50 km (31 mi) south of the county seat, Târgu Mureș, on the border with Sibiu County. The Daneș train station serves the CFR Main Line 300, which connects Bucharest with the Hungarian border near Oradea. The route of the Via Transilvanica long-distance trail passes through the villages of Stejărenii and Criș.

At the 2021 census, the commune had a population of 4,743; of those, 66.73% were Romanians, 18.26% Roma, 1.37% Germans, and 1.27% Hungarians.

== See also ==
- List of Hungarian exonyms (Mureș County)

== Gallery ==
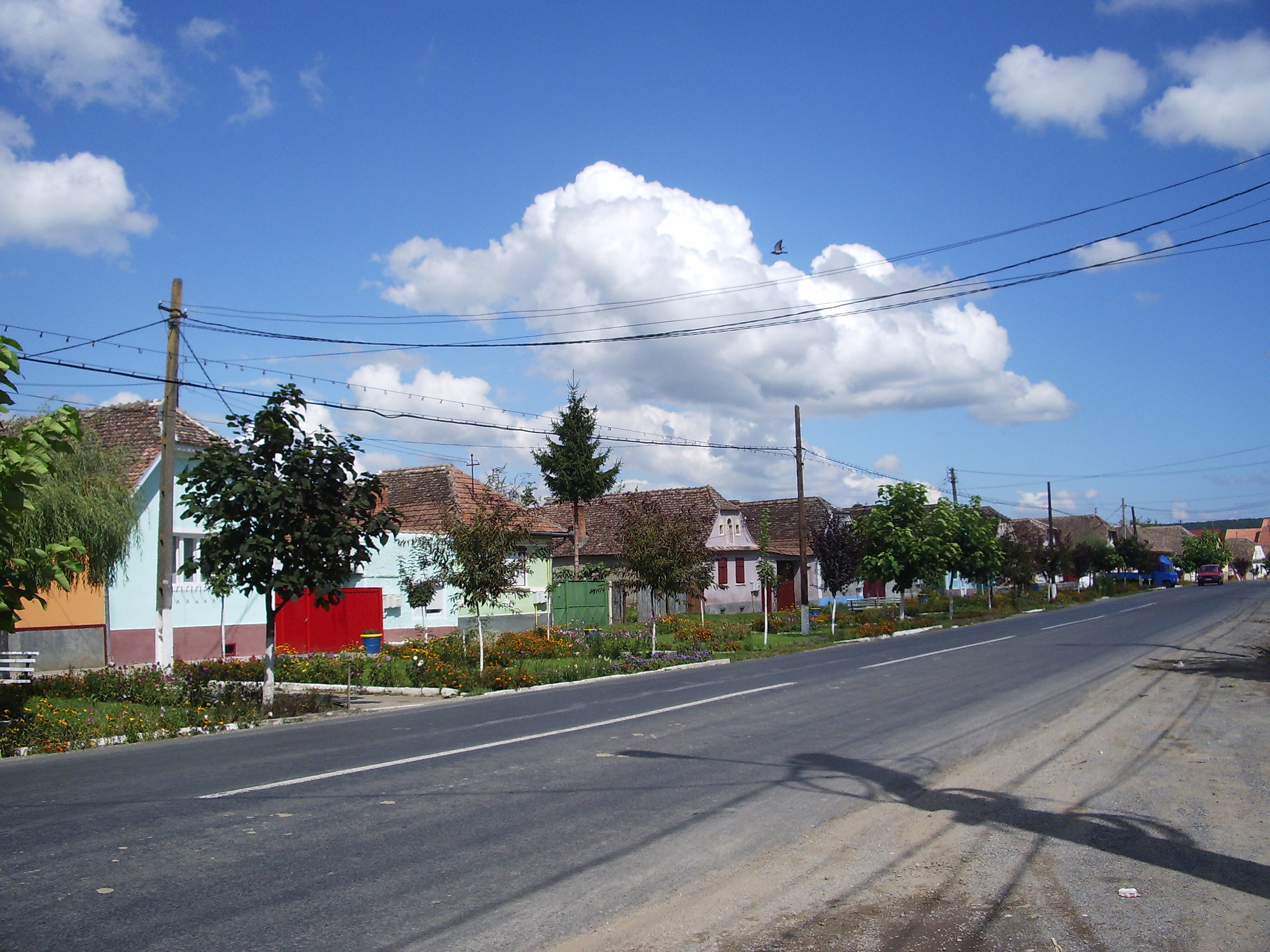

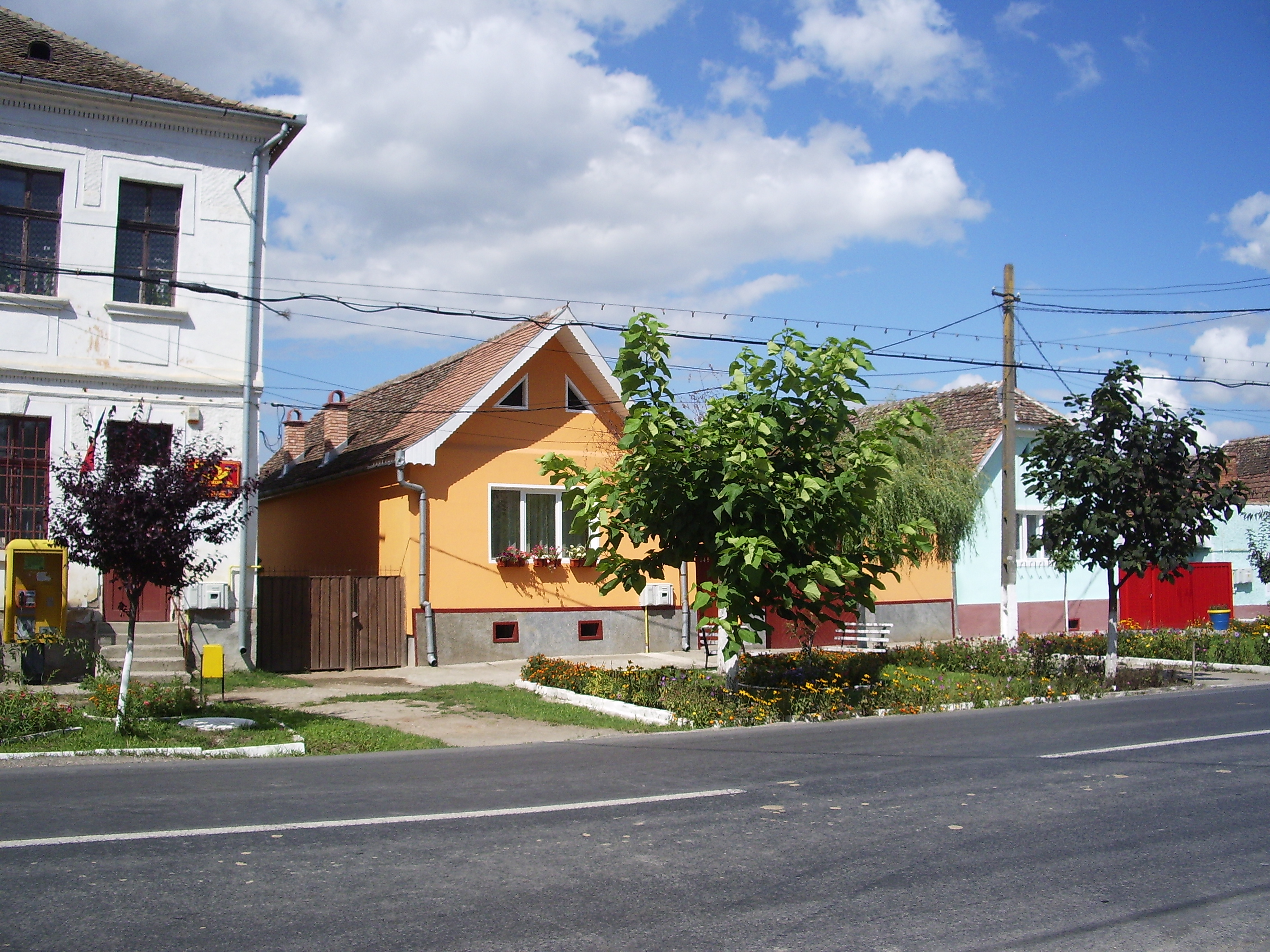

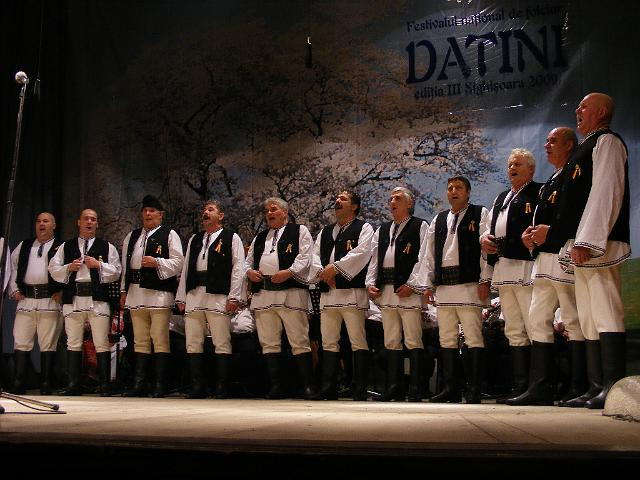

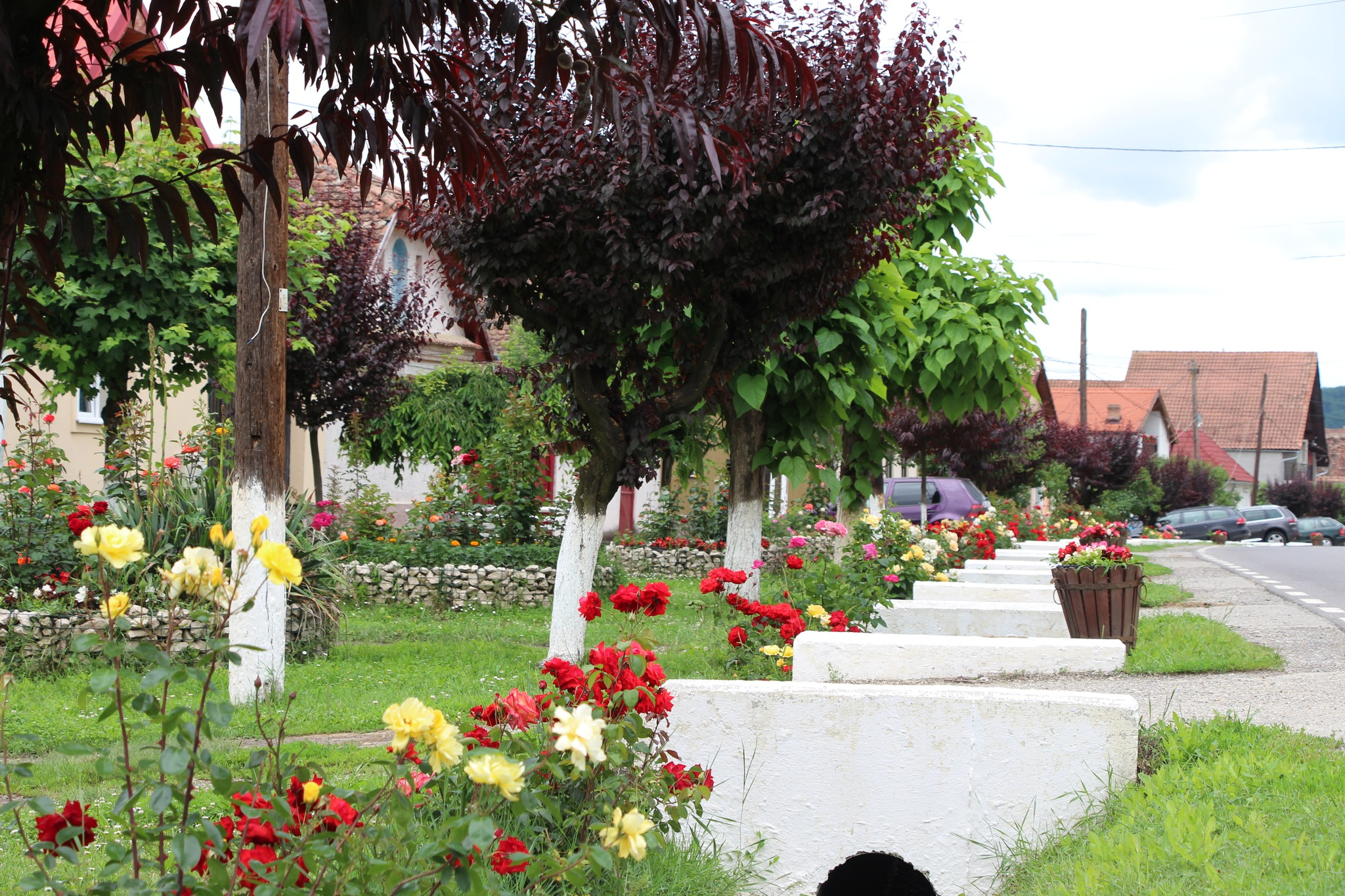

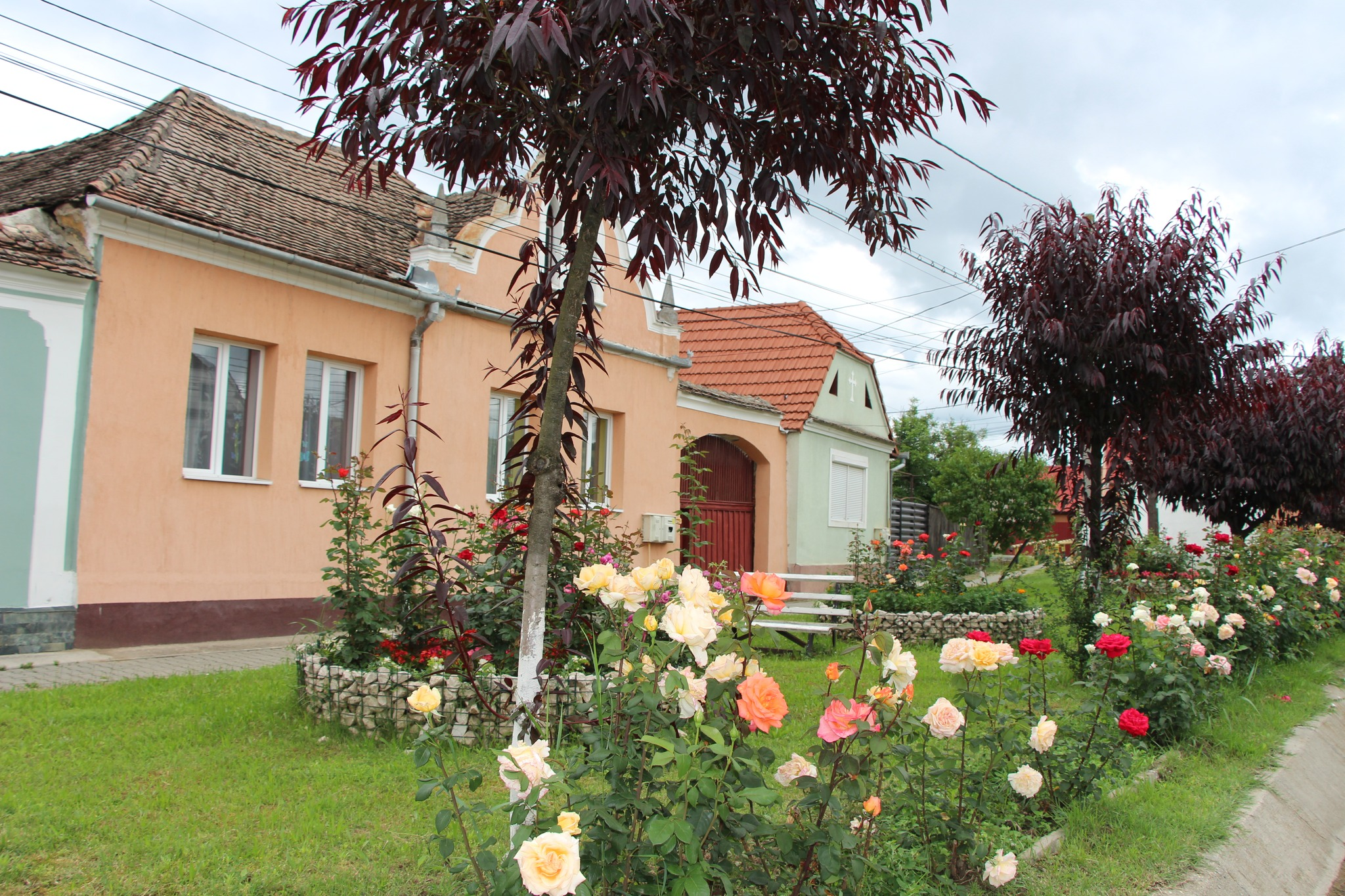

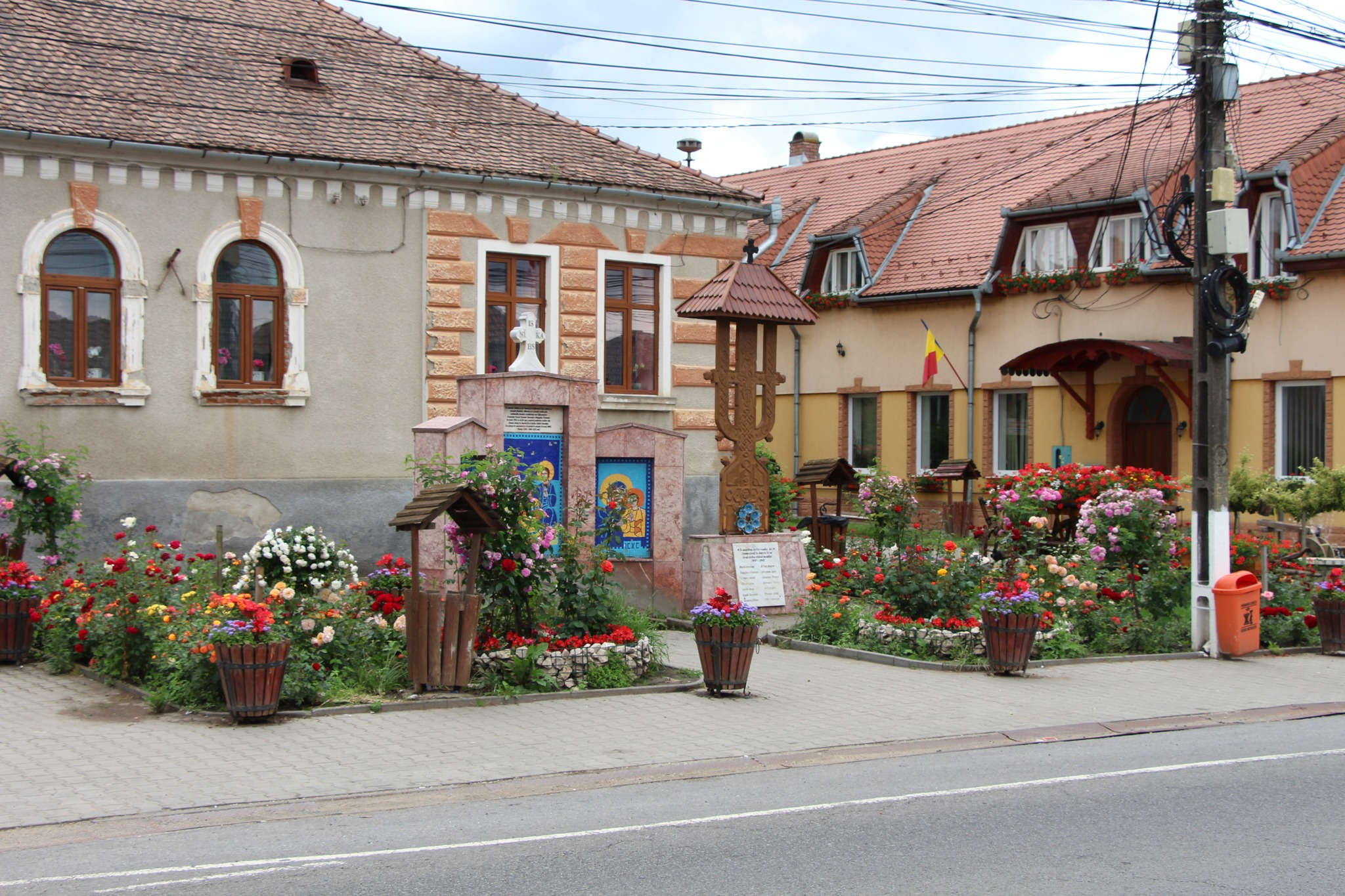

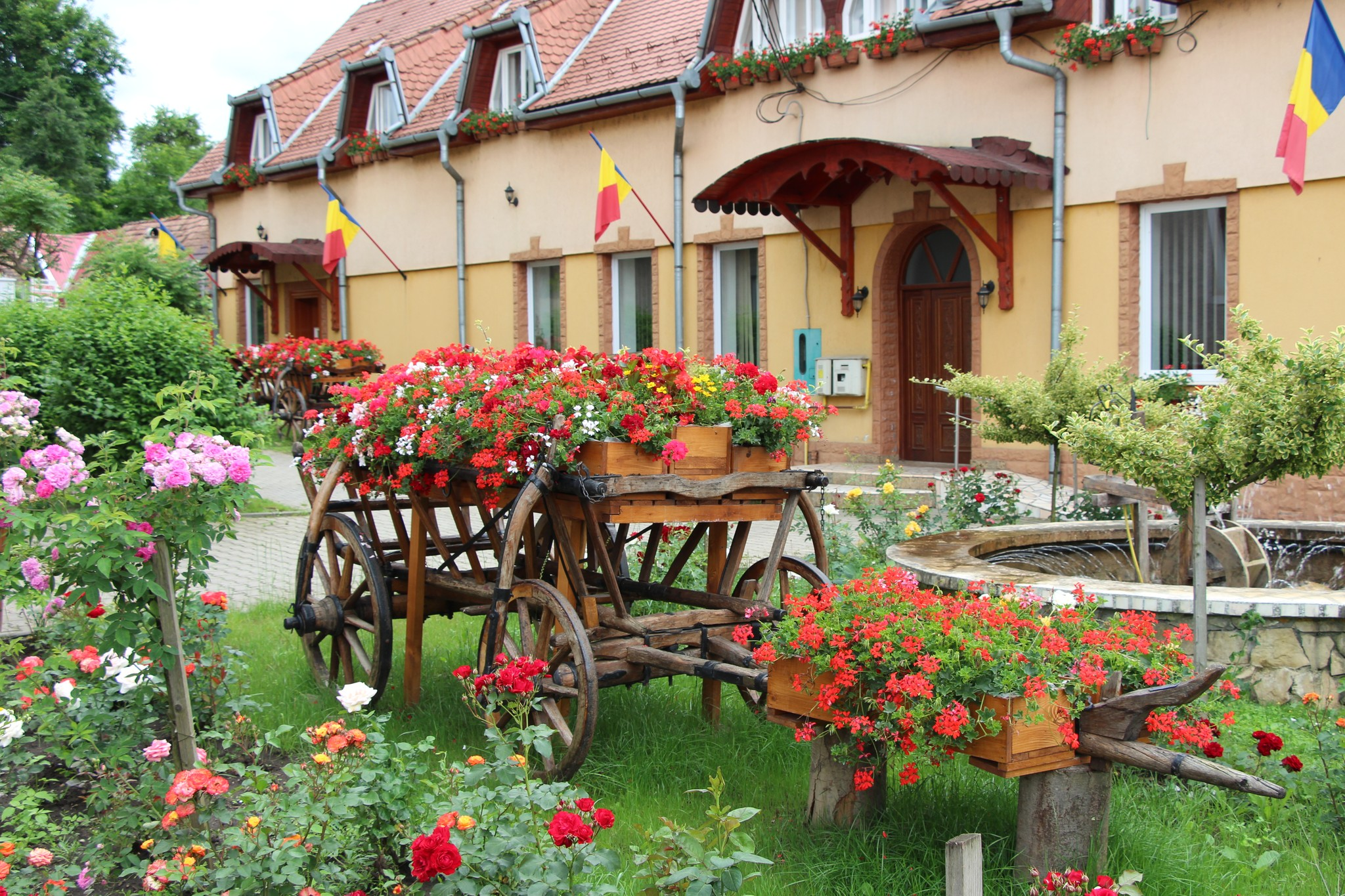

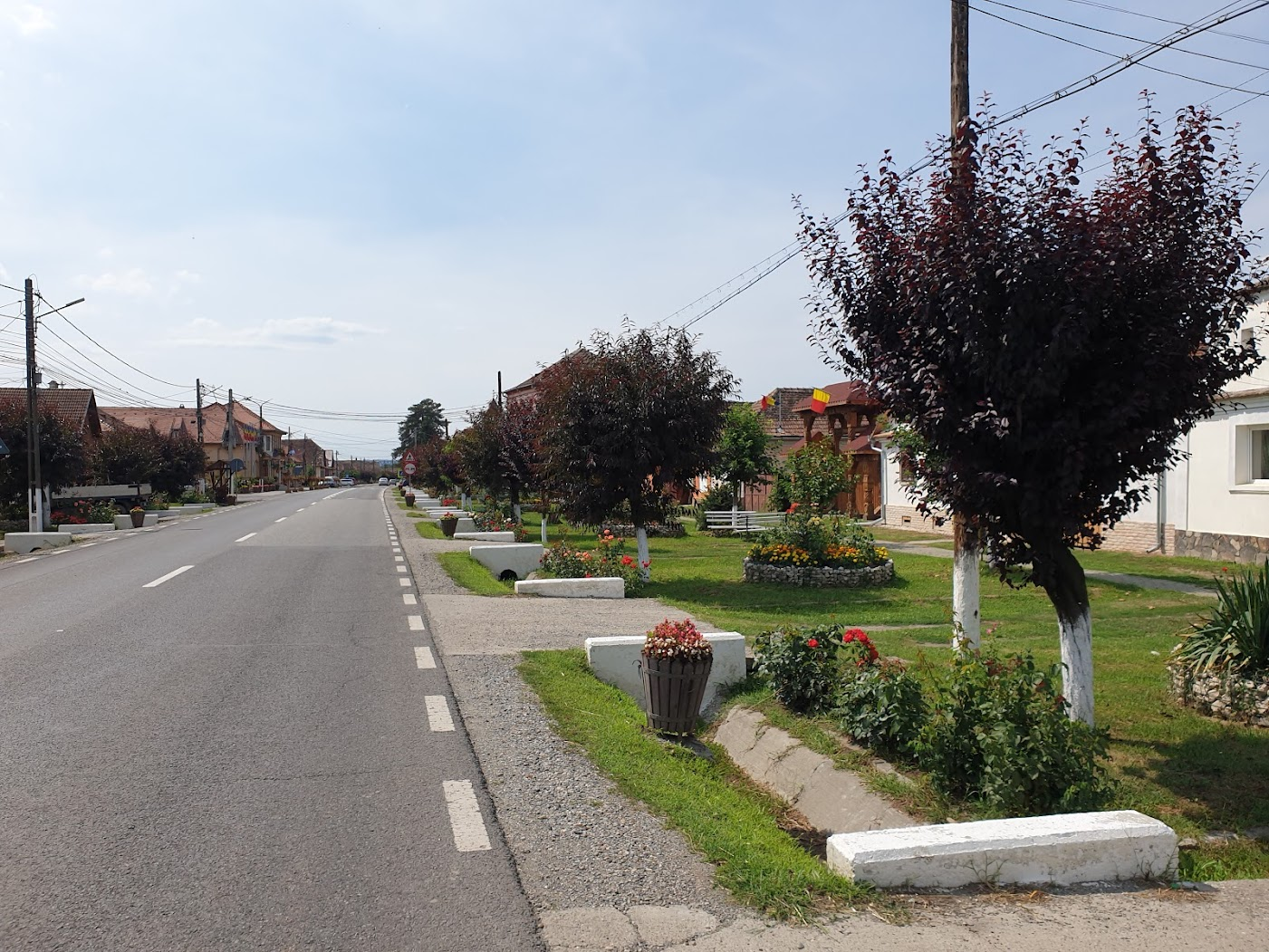
