= Brădești, Harghita =

Brădești Fenyéd
- Commune
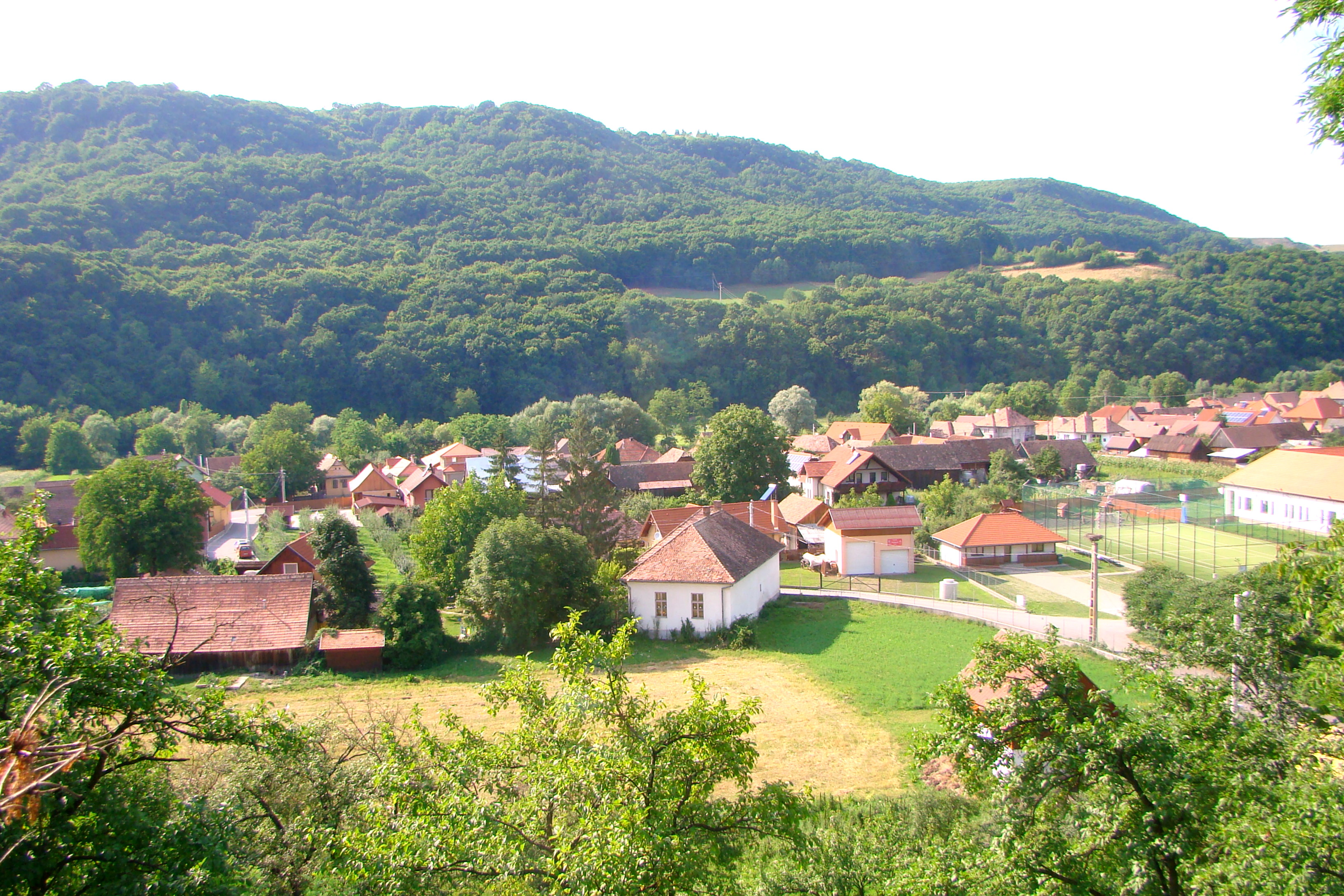

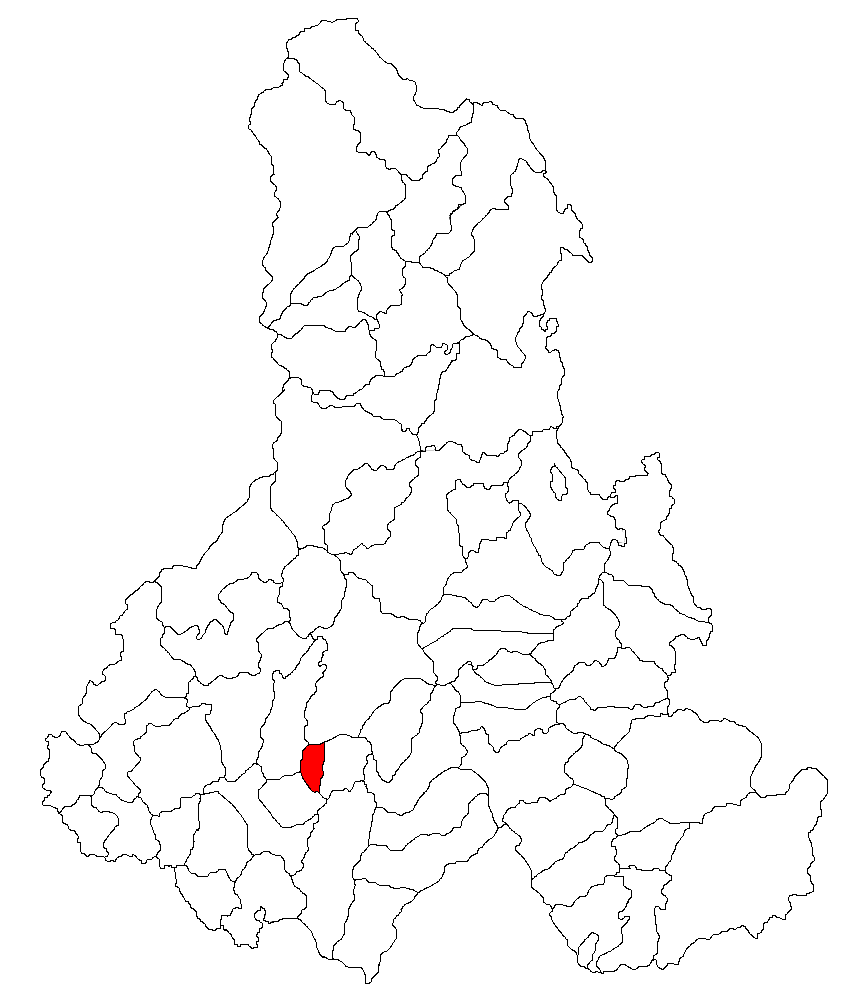
- Location in Harghita County

- Location in Romania
- Coordinates: 46°20′20″N 25°20′30″E
- Country: Romania
- County: Harghita

Government
  - Mayor (2020–2024): Botond Bokor (UDMR)
- Area: 16.79 km^{2} (6.48 sq mi)
- Elevation: 496 m (1,627 ft)
- Population (2021-12-01): 2,122
  - Density: 126.4/km^{2} (327.3/sq mi)
- Time zone: UTC+02:00 (EET)
  - Summer (DST): UTC+03:00 (EEST)
- Postal code: 537025
- Area code: +(40) 266
- Vehicle reg.: HR
- Website: www.fenyedkozseg.ro

Brădești (Hungarian: Fenyéd, Hungarian pronunciation: [ˈfɛɲeːd]) is a commune in Harghita County, Romania. It lies in the Székely Land, an ethno-cultural region in eastern Transylvania. The commune is composed of two villages: Brădești and Târnovița (Küküllőkeményfalva).

== History ==
Until the reorganization of the system of the local administration of Transylvania in 1876, the village belonged to the Udvarhelyszék, afterwards to Udvarhely County in the Kingdom of Hungary. In the aftermath of World War I, the Union of Transylvania with Romania was declared in December 1918. At the start of the Hungarian–Romanian War of 1918–1919, the locality passed under Romanian administration. After the Treaty of Trianon of 1920, it became part of the Kingdom of Romania and fell within plasa Odorhei of Odorhei County during the interwar period.

In 1940, the Second Vienna Award granted Northern Transylvania to Hungary. Towards the end of World War II, Romanian and Soviet armies entered the area in September 1944. The territory of Northern Transylvania remained under Soviet military administration until 9 March 1945, after which it became again part of Romania. In 1950, after Communist Romania was established, Brădești became part of the Odorhei Raion of Stalin Region. Between 1952 and 1960, the commune fell within the Magyar Autonomous Region, between 1960 and 1968 the Mureș-Magyar Autonomous Region. After the administrative reform of 1968, the region was abolished, and since then, the commune has been part of Harghita County.

== Demographics ==
At the 2011 census, the commune had a population of 1,915; out of them, 1,871 (97.7%) were Hungarians, 20 (1.0%) were Romanians, and 3 (0.2%) were Roma. 83% of the commune population were Roman Catholic, 10% are Reformed, 4% were Unitarian, and 1% were Orthodox. At the 2021 census, Brădești had 2,122 inhabitants; of those, 92.18% were Hungarians, and 1.79% Roma.
