= Vișa =

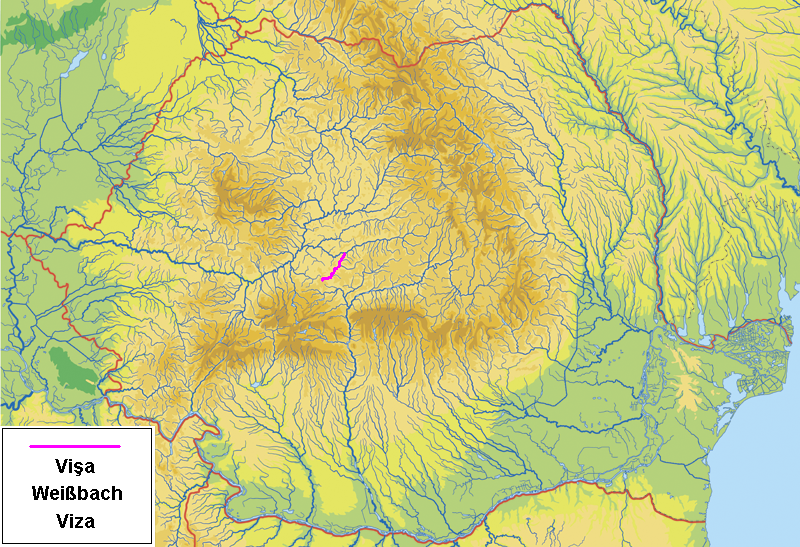

- Location within Romania

Location
- Country: Romania
- Counties: Sibiu County
- Villages: Ocna Sibiului, Loamneș, Șeica Mare, Axente Sever

Physical characteristics
- Mouth: Târnava Mare
  - location: Copșa Mică
  - coordinates: 46.1181°N 24.2092°E
- Length: 44 km (27 mi)
- Basin size: 555 km^{2} (214 sq mi)
- Discharge
  - location: *
  - average: 1.43 m^{3}/s (50 cu ft/s)

Basin features
- Progression: Târnava Mare→ Târnava→ Mureș→ Tisza→ Danube→ Black Sea
- Tributaries
  - right: Calva

The Vișa (German: Weißbach) is a left tributary of the river Târnava Mare in Romania. It discharges into the Târnava Mare in Copșa Mică. Its length is 44 km (27 mi) and its basin size is 555 km^{2} (214 sq mi).

== Tributaries ==
The following rivers are tributaries to the river Vișa (from source to mouth):

- Left: Râura, Pârâul Popii
- Right: Slimnic, Valea Rușilor, Calva, Râpa, Șoala
