= Calva (river) =

- Location within Romania

Location
- Country: Romania
- Counties: Sibiu County
- Villages: Alma Vii, Moardăș, Mihăileni, Buia, Boarta

Physical characteristics
- Mouth: Vișa
  - location: Șeica Mare
  - coordinates: 46.0195°N 24.1603°E
- Length: 33 km (21 mi)
- Basin size: 184 km^{2} (71 sq mi)

Basin features
- Progression: Vișa→ Târnava Mare→ Târnava→ Mureș→ Tisza→ Danube→ Black Sea
- Tributaries
  - left: Metiș, Valea Satului

The Calva is a right tributary of the river Vișa in Romania. It discharges into the Vișa in Șeica Mare. Its length is 33 km (21 mi) and its basin size is 184 km^{2} (71 sq mi).
