= Axente Sever, Sibiu =

Axente Sever
- Commune
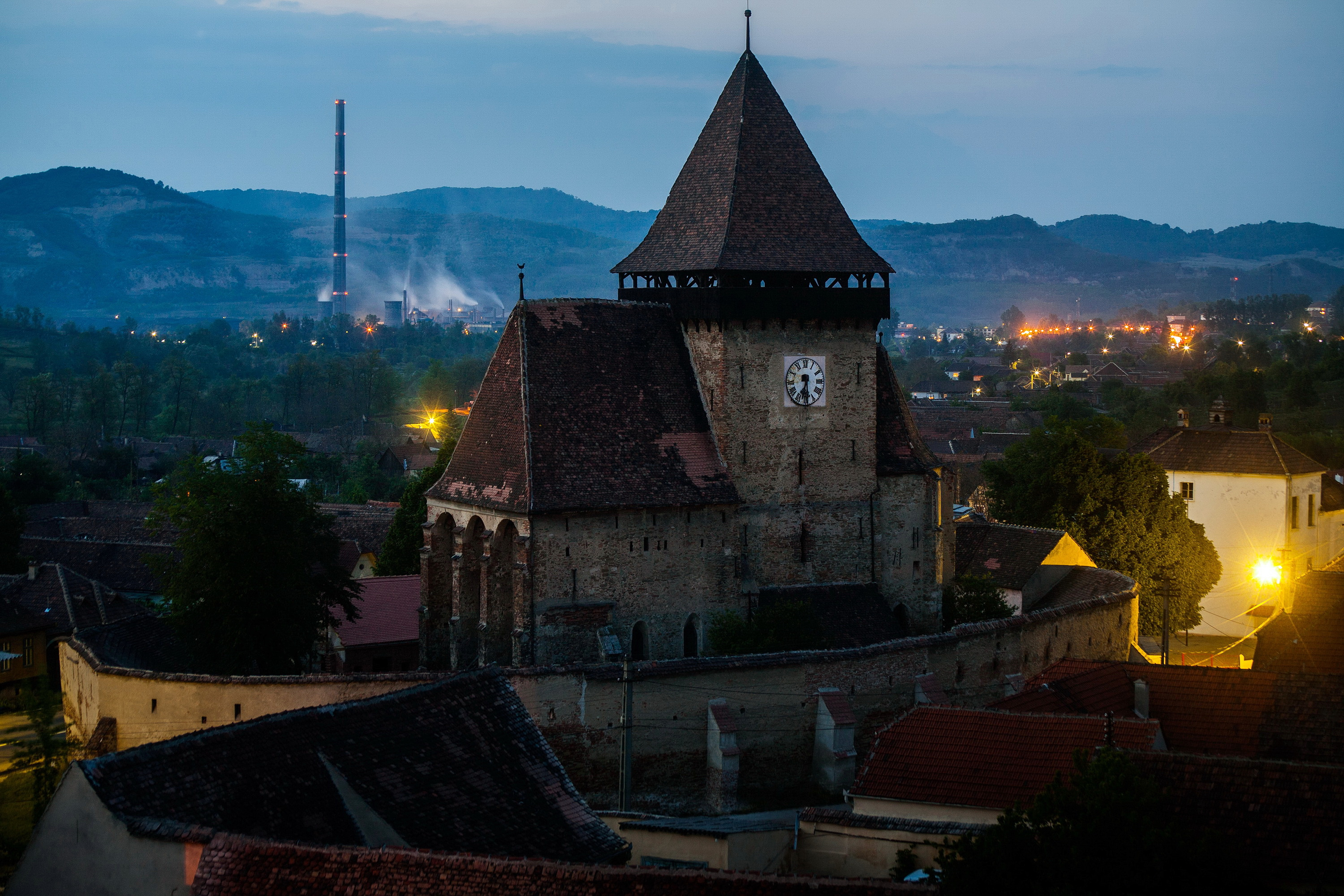

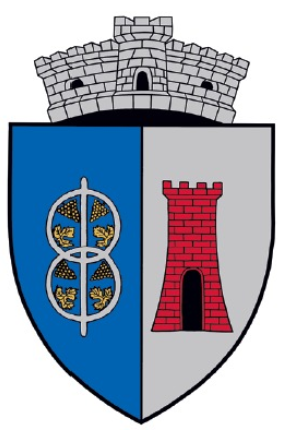
- Coat of arms

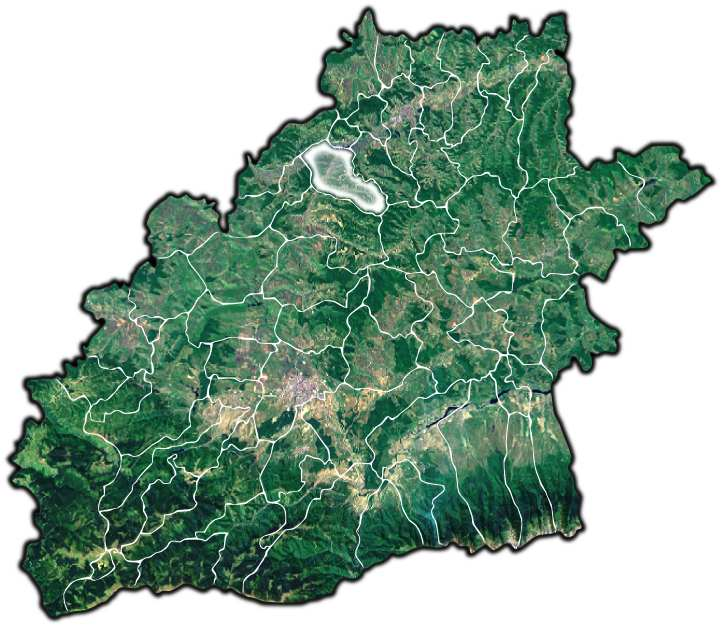
- Location in Sibiu County

- Location in Romania
- Coordinates: 46°6′N 24°13′E
- Country: Romania
- County: Sibiu

Government
  - Mayor (2020–2024): Marius Grecu (PNL)
- Area: 73.7 km^{2} (28.5 sq mi)
- Elevation: 302 m (991 ft)
- Population (2021-12-01): 3,286
  - Density: 44.6/km^{2} (115/sq mi)
- Time zone: UTC+02:00 (EET)
  - Summer (DST): UTC+03:00 (EEST)
- Postal code: 557025
- Area code: +(40) x59
- Vehicle reg.: SB
- Website: axentesever.ro

Axente Sever (until 1931 Frâua; German: Frauendorf; Hungarian: Asszonyfalva) is a commune located in Sibiu County, Transylvania, Romania, named after Ioan Axente Sever.

The commune is composed of three villages: Agârbiciu (Arbegen; Szászegerbegy), Axente Sever and Șoala (Schaal; Sálya). In each of these three villages there are Saxon fortified churches erected in the 14th century and fortified till the 16th century.

== Geography ==
The commune is situated on the Transylvanian Plateau, at an altitude of 302 m (991 ft), on the banks of the river Vișa. Located in the northern part of Sibiu County, just south of the town of Copșa Mică, it is crossed by national road DN14. The closest city is Mediaș, 14 km (8.7 mi) to the northeast; the county seat, Sibiu, is 38 km (24 mi) to the south.

The Axente Sever halt serves the CFR rail line 208, which runs north from Sibiu to Copșa Mică. The route of the Via Transilvanica long-distance trail passes through the villages of Axente Sever and Agârbiciu.

== Etymology ==
The village's original name, Frauendorf, refers to the fact that the village was under the jurisdiction of a Saxon princess. The village's contemporary Romanian name originates from the name of Axente Sever (1821–1906), a controversial revolutionary, propagandist, and theologian born in the village.

== History ==
Archeological remains from the Neolithic, early Bronze Age, early Iron Age, and Roman period have all been found in the area around the village.

In the 12th century, Saxons settled the area, and constructed a gothic fortified church on the ruins of an older church. Documents attest that this church was standing by at least 1330. After 1570, the settlement became part of the Principality of Transylvania. In 1876, it fell within the Nagy-Küküllő County of the Kingdom of Hungary. In the aftermath of World War I, the Union of Transylvania with Romania was declared in December 1918. At the start of the Hungarian–Romanian War of 1918–1919, the locality passed under Romanian administration; after the Treaty of Trianon of 1920, it became part of the Kingdom of Romania. In 1925, it fell within Plasa Șeica Mare of Târnava-Mare County.

After the establishment of the Romanian People's Republic in 1947 and the subsequent administrative reform of 1950, Axente Sever became part of the Sibiu Region, and from 1952, the Stalin Region (renamed Brașov Region in 1960). In 1968, the old administrative division of județ was reinstated, and the commune became part of Sibiu County.

== Demographics ==
In 1910, the village was majority German, with a Romanian minority. Following the Second World War, the German population, which lived in the village for over 800 years was forcibly deported.

At the 2021 census, Axente Sever had a population of 3,286; of those, 82.59% were Romanians and 6.91% Roma.

== Gallery ==
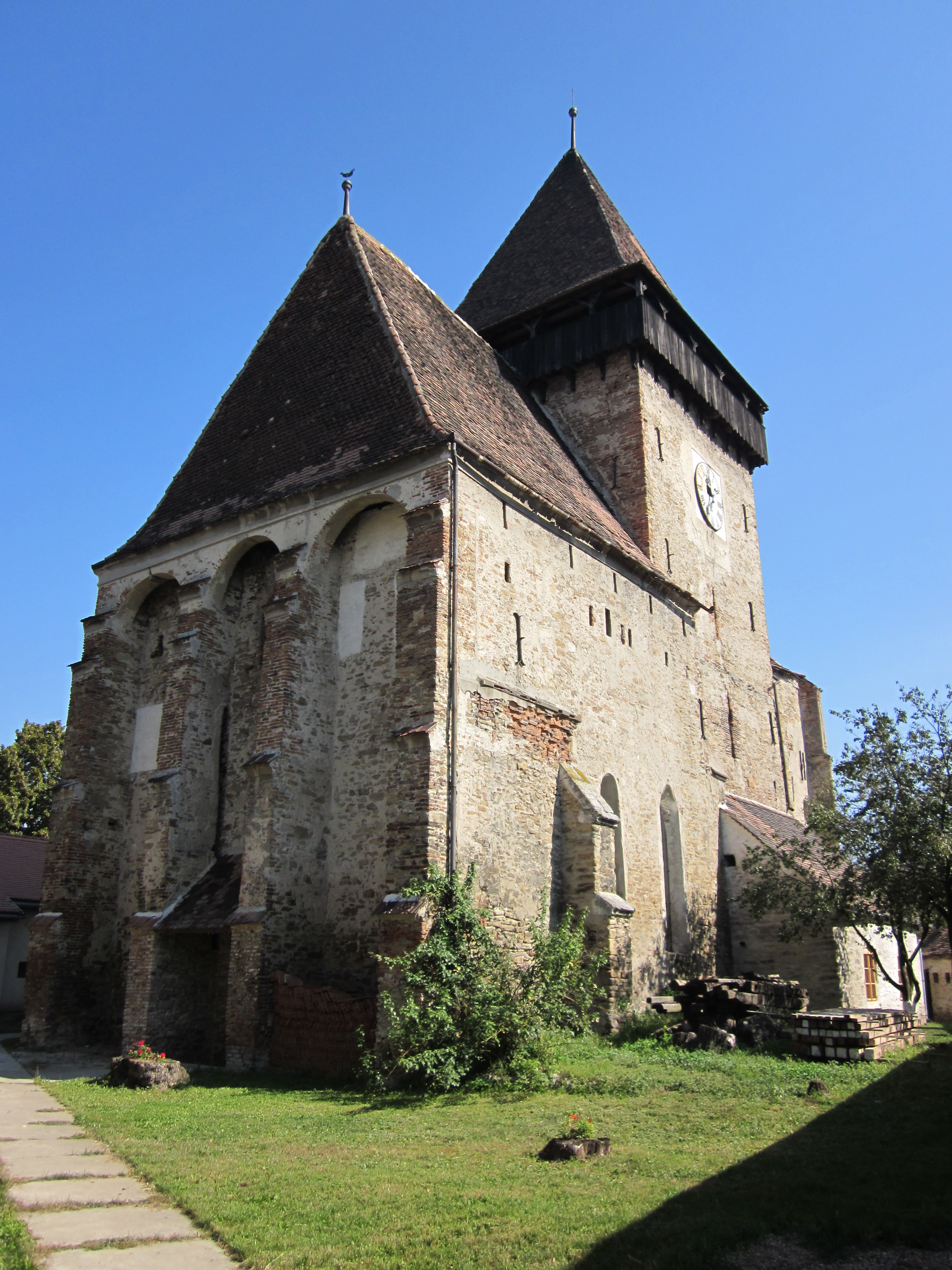
Fortified Church of Axente Sever

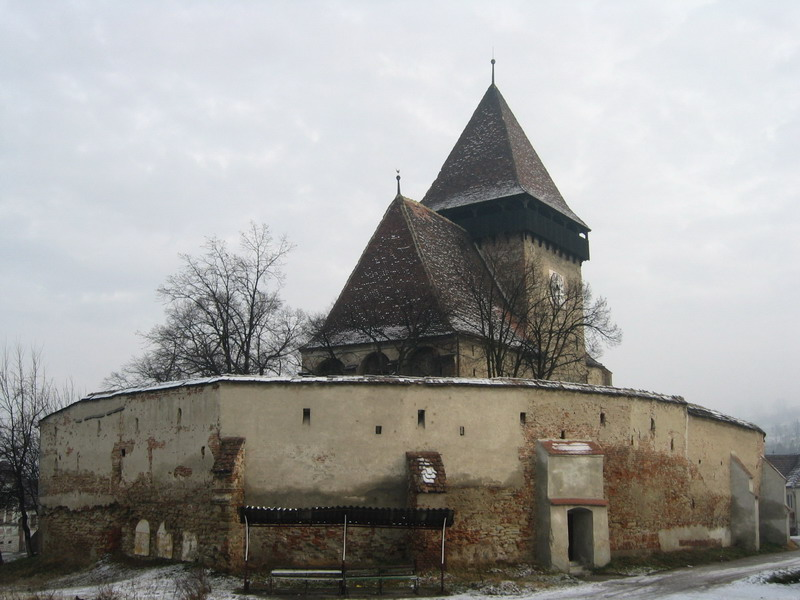
Fortified Church of Axente Sever

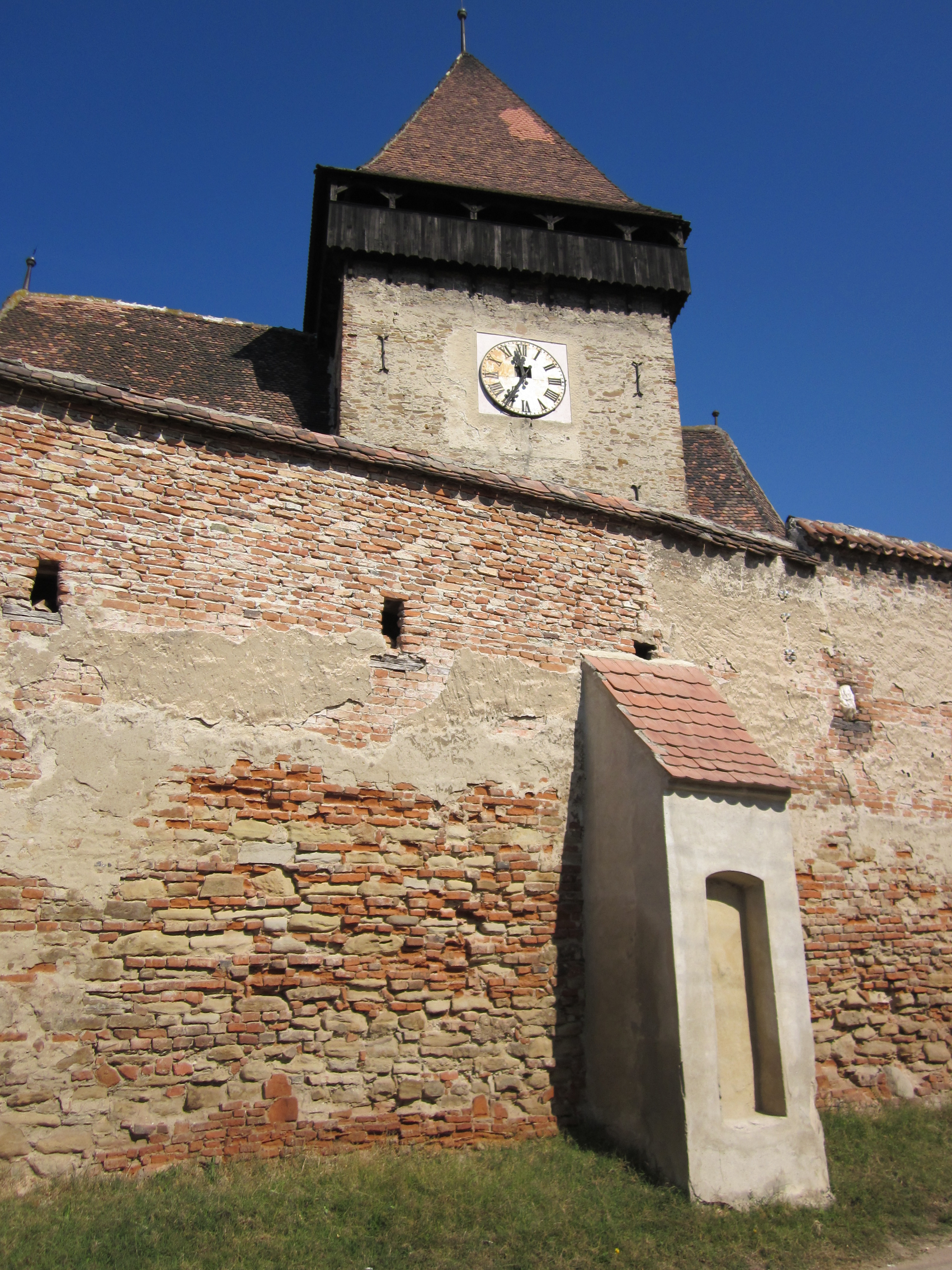
Fortified Church of Axente Sever

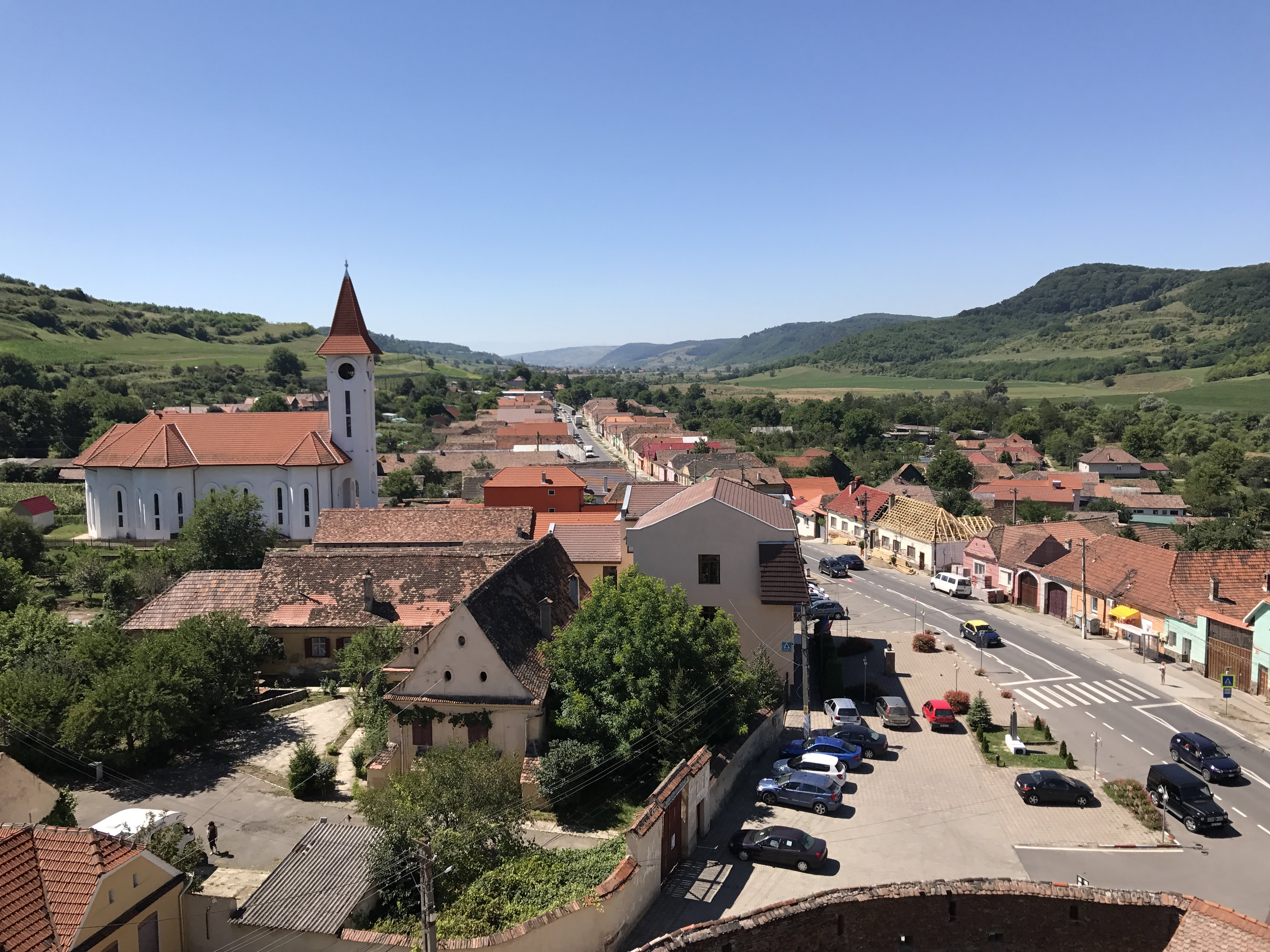
Axente Sever

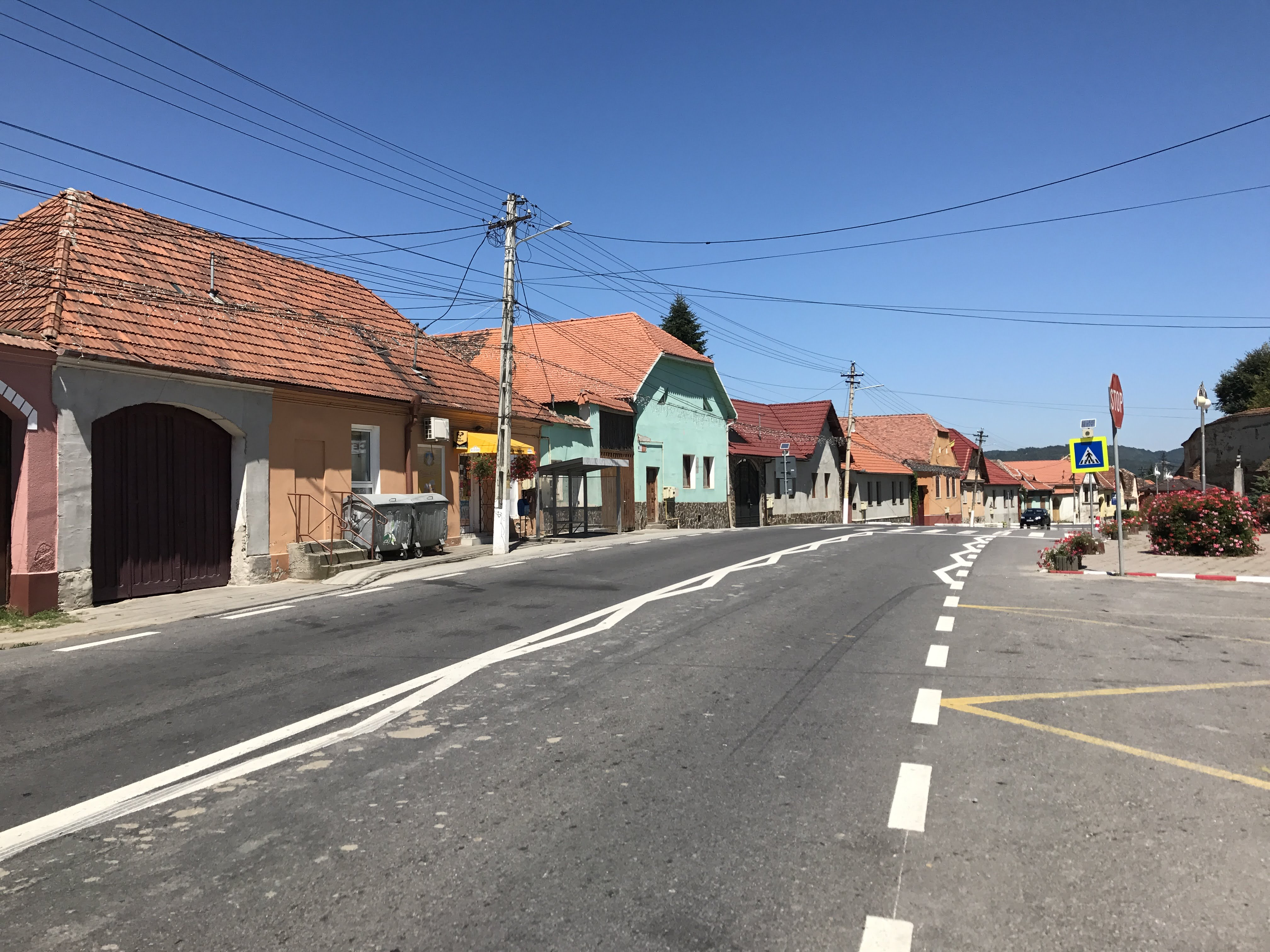
The main street

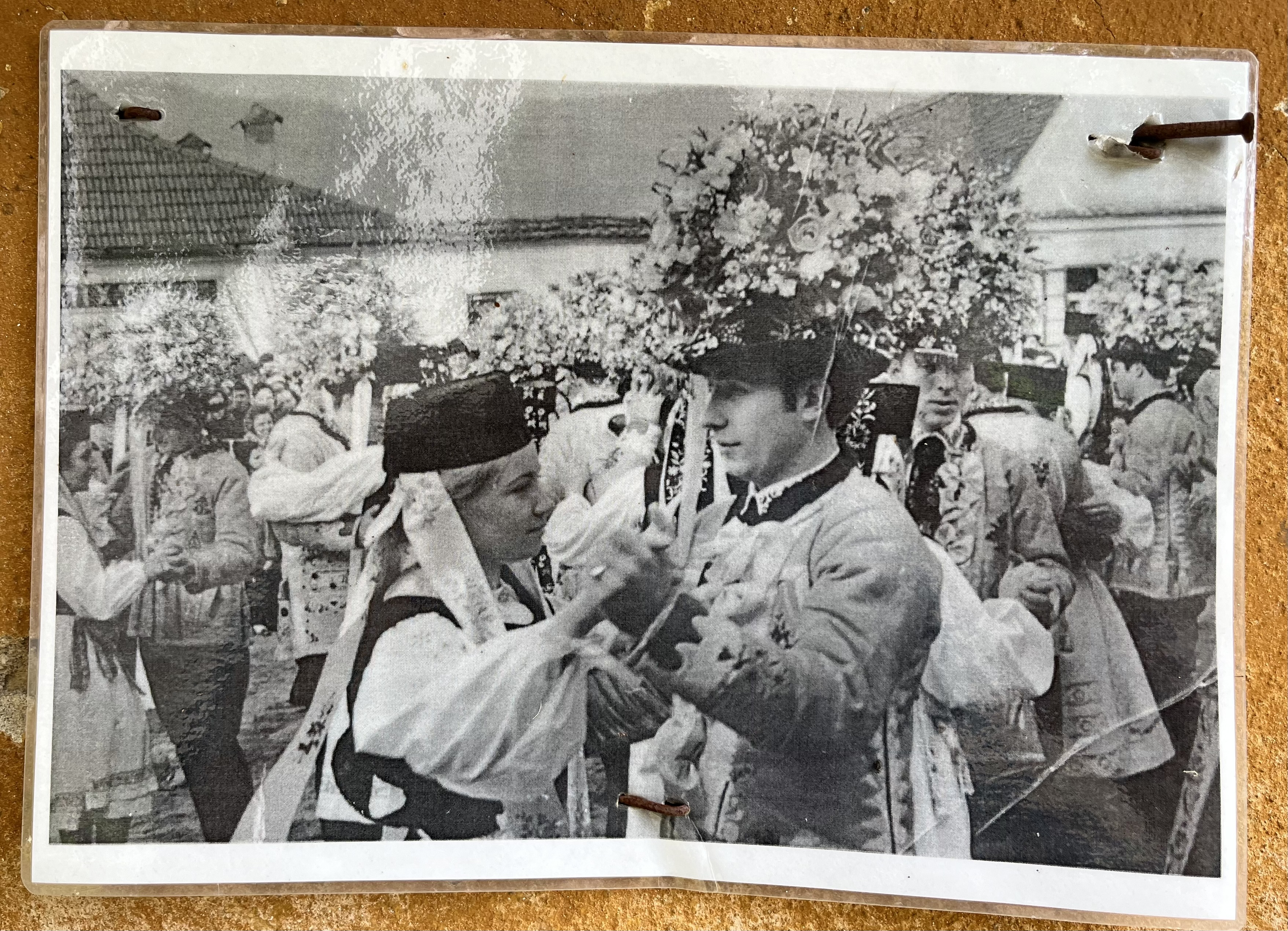
Transylvanian Saxons dancing in Frauendorf
