= Șarba River =

Șarba River may refer to:

- Șarba, a tributary of the Jiul de Vest in Gorj County
- Șarba, a tributary of the Slimnic in Sibiu County
