= Râura =

- Location within Romania

Location
- Country: Romania
- Counties: Sibiu County
- Villages: Topârcea

Physical characteristics
- Mouth: Vișa
  - location: near Mândra
  - coordinates: 45.9134°N 24.0757°E
- Length: 14 km (8.7 mi)
- Basin size: 69 km^{2} (27 sq mi)

Basin features
- Progression: Vișa→ Târnava Mare→ Târnava→ Mureș→ Tisza→ Danube→ Black Sea
- Tributaries
  - left: Alămor

The Râura is a left tributary of the river Vișa in Romania. It flows into the Vișa near Mândra. Its length is 14 km (8.7 mi) and its basin size is 69 km^{2} (27 sq mi).
