= Șoala =

- Location within Romania

Location
- Country: Romania
- Counties: Sibiu County
- Villages: Șoala

Physical characteristics
- Mouth: Vișa
  - location: Agârbiciu
  - coordinates: 46.0675°N 24.1878°E
- Length: 12 km (7.5 mi)
- Basin size: 29 km^{2} (11 sq mi)

Basin features
- Progression: Vișa→ Târnava Mare→ Târnava→ Mureș→ Tisza→ Danube→ Black Sea

The Șoala is a right tributary of the river Vișa in Romania. It flows into the Vișa in Agârbiciu. Its length is 12 km (7.5 mi) and its basin size is 29 km^{2} (11 sq mi).
