= Sarba =

Sarba may refer to:

- Sarba, Lebanon (Arabic: صربا), a town Lebanon
- Sârbă, Romanian folk dance
- Șarba River (Jiu), a tributary of Jul de Vest, Romania
- Șarba River (Vișa), a tributary of Slimnic (Vișa), Romania
