= Ioan Barac =

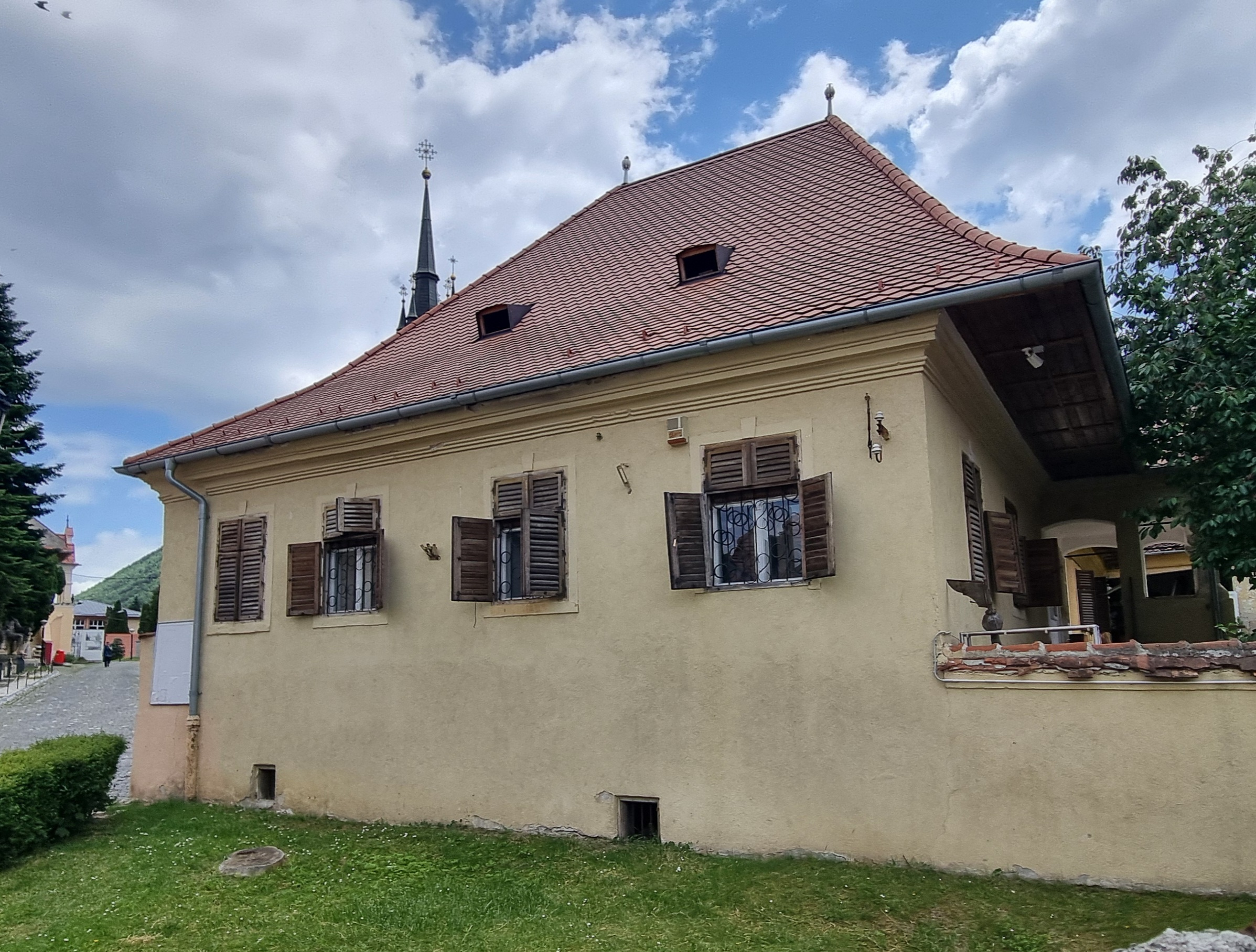
Barac's house in Brașov

Ioan Barac (1776–July 18, 1848) was an Imperial Austrian ethnic Romanian translator and poet.

== Biography ==
Born in Alămor, Sibiu County, his father Ioan was a priest. Barac attended the Reformed gymnasium in Aiud, followed by law studies in Cluj. In 1801, he taught at the Romanian Orthodox school in Avrig. The following year, he became a teacher at the First Romanian School in Șcheii Brașovului, itself attached to St. Nicholas Church. He was a magistrate at the same time, and in 1805 took on the role of Romanian-language interpreter for the Brașov city hall, which he held for the rest of his life.

In 1837, he edited Foaia Duminecii, the first illustrated magazine in Transylvania. His first published work, Istorie despre Arghir cel Frumos și despre Elena cea Frumoasă și pustiită crăiasă (1801), was among the most widely read and appreciated Romanian books of the first half of the 19th century, appearing in many editions. He was one of the first to translate Hamlet into Romanian, working from the German version by Friedrich Ludwig Schröder. Between 1836 and 1840, he published eight volumes of stories from One Thousand and One Nights, and also rendered stories featuring Till Eulenspiegel and Mattie the Goose-boy. His original work included Adevărul and Cercul timpului. His prefaces featured interesting literary ideas in the spirit of a pre-modern aesthetic. Barac was a folk poet not just in the style of his verses, but also in conception. Unusually laborious and renowned in his day, he was a representative figure of the Transylvanian School, alongside Vasile Aaron and Dimitrie Țichindeal.

Barac's 17th-century house, located at 3 Piața Unirii in Brașov, is listed as a historic monument by Romania's Ministry of Culture and Religious Affairs.
