= Râpa (Vișa) =

- Location within Romania

Location
- Country: Romania
- Counties: Sibiu County
- Villages: Petiș

Physical characteristics
- Mouth: Vișa
  - coordinates: 46.0337°N 24.1665°E
- Length: 13 km (8.1 mi)
- Basin size: 28 km^{2} (11 sq mi)

Basin features
- Progression: Vișa→ Târnava Mare→ Târnava→ Mureș→ Tisza→ Danube→ Black Sea
- Tributaries
  - left: Mighindoala

The Râpa is a right tributary of the river Vișa in Romania. It flows into the Vișa in Șeica Mare. Its length is 13 km (8.1 mi) and its basin size is 28 km^{2} (11 sq mi).
