= Șeica Mare =

- Commune
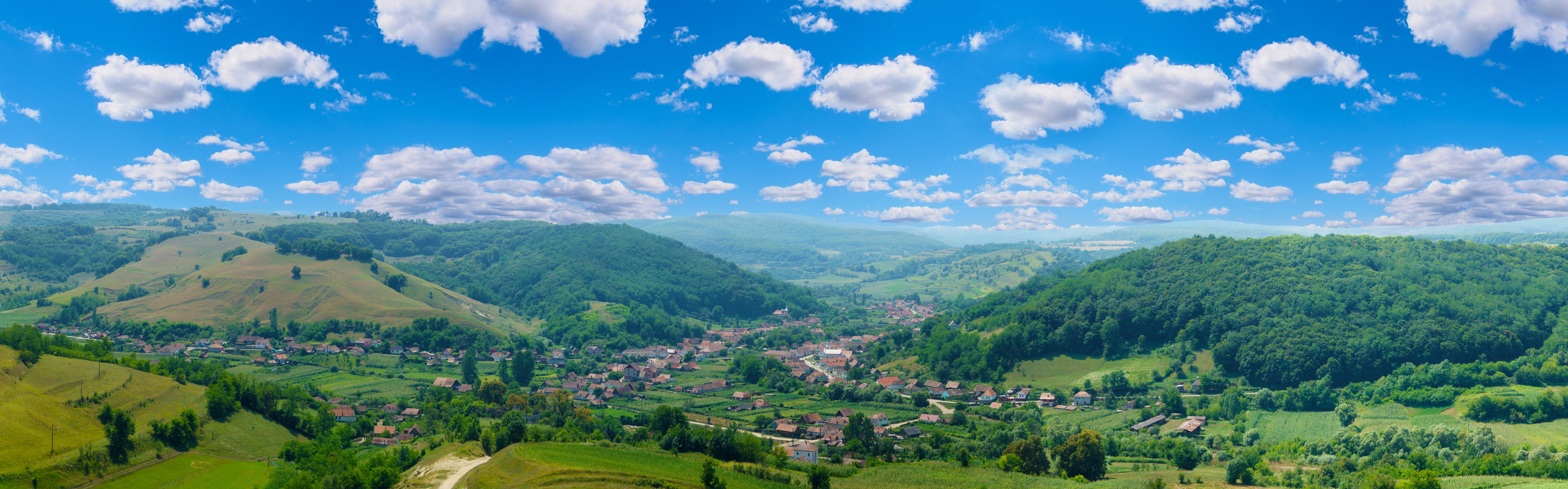
- Buia village

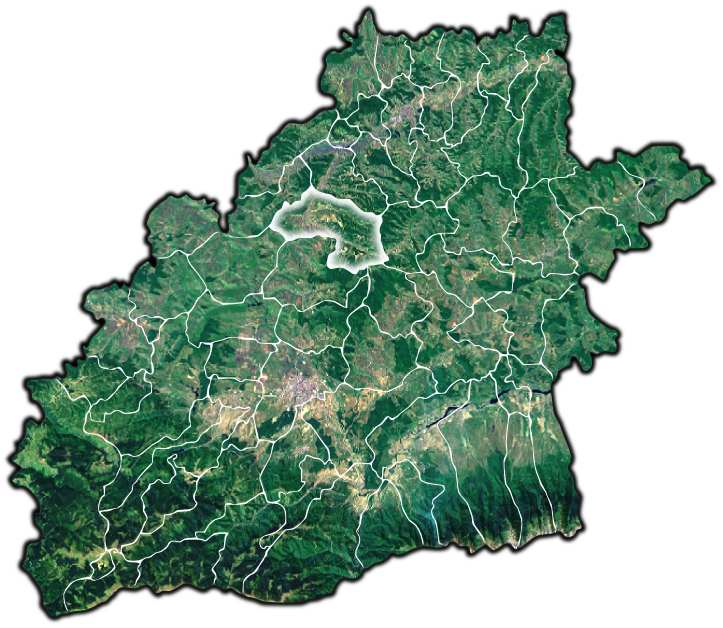
- Location in Sibiu County

- Location in Romania
- Coordinates: 46°1′N 24°9′E
- Country: Romania
- County: Sibiu

Government
  - Mayor (2024–2028): Nicolae Șușa (PNL)
- Area: 120.24 km^{2} (46.42 sq mi)
- Elevation: 337 m (1,106 ft)
- Population (2021-12-01): 3,925
  - Density: 32.64/km^{2} (84.55/sq mi)
- Time zone: UTC+02:00 (EET)
  - Summer (DST): UTC+03:00 (EEST)
- Postal code: 557245
- Area code: (+40) 02 69
- Vehicle reg.: SB
- Website: seicamare.ro

Șeica Mare (German: Marktschelken; Transylvanian Saxon: Martscheelken; Hungarian: Nagyselyk) is a commune located in Sibiu County, Transylvania, Romania. It is composed of six villages: Boarta (Michelsdorf; Mihályfalva), Buia (Bell; Bólya), Mighindoala (Engenthal; Ingodály), Petiș (Petersdorf; Kispéterfalva), Șeica Mare, and Ștenea (Stein; Isztina). Calvaser (Kaltwasser; Hidegvíz) was also a village until the late 20th century, when it was absorbed by Șeica Mare village.

== Geography ==
The commune is situated on the Transylvanian Plateau, on the banks of the river Vișa; the rivers Calva and Râpa flow into the Vișa in Șeica Mare.

Located in the north-central part of the county, the commune is crossed by national road DN14. The closest city is Mediaș, 23 km (14 mi) to the northeast; the county seat, Sibiu, is 32 km (20 mi) to the south.

The Șeica Mare train station serves the CFR rail line 208, which runs north from Sibiu to Copșa Mică.

== Demographics ==
At the 2011 census, Șeica Mare had 4,470 inhabitants; of those, 88.8% were Romanians, 6% Hungarians, 4.2% Roma, and 1% Germans (more specifically Transylvanian Saxons). At the 2021 census, the commune had a population of 3,925; of those, 84.89% were Romanians and 3.85% Hungarians.

== Natives ==
- Farkas Bolyai (1775–1856), mathematician
- Cornel Oțelea (1940–2025), handball player

== Villages ==
Buia village was first attested in a document of 1269, under the name of poss Bulla. In 1918, it had 1167 residents, of whom 736 were Romanians and the rest Germans and Hungarians. By 2002, the population was down to 634: 516 Romanians, 104 Hungarians, and three Roma. The village is in the southern part of the commune, linked to Șeica Mare by an 11 km (6.8 mi) stretch of county road. Farkas Bolyai was born there in 1775.

Mighindoala (German: Engenthal, meaning "Angels' Valley", Hungarian: Ingodály) is a small village in the Șeica Mare commune.

As recently as 1975, the village had in excess of 50 houses, but was gradually deserted after the communist regime withdrew infrastructure such as teachers and doctors. As of 2004, there were only four people left in this village. There were only about ten buildings standing, including the Protestant church. The Romanian Orthodox church no longer has a roof, and is now abandoned.

The only economic activity is agriculture, very much based on the traditional farming of sheep, cows, and horses.

=== Gallery ===
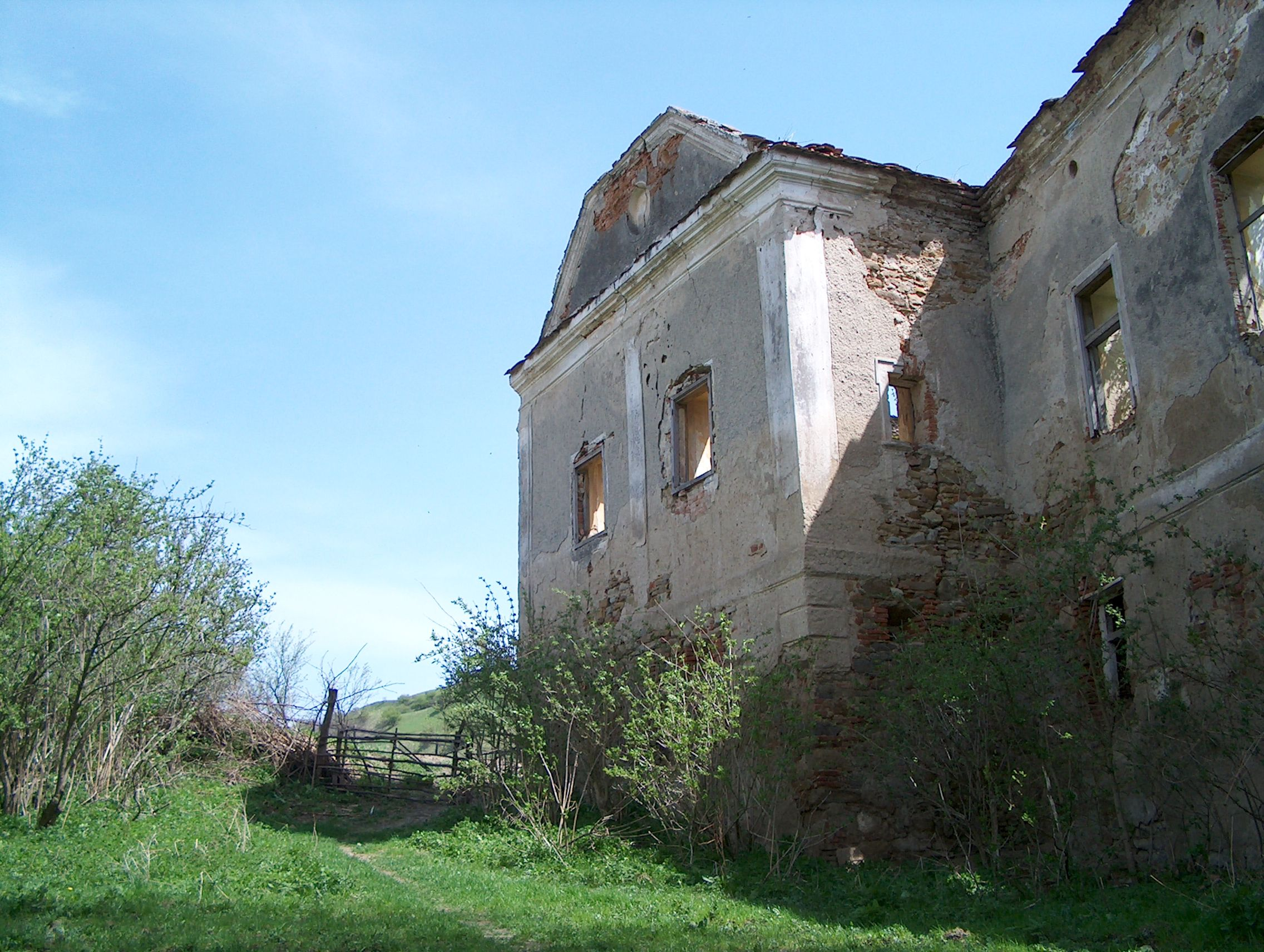
Ruins of Buia Castle

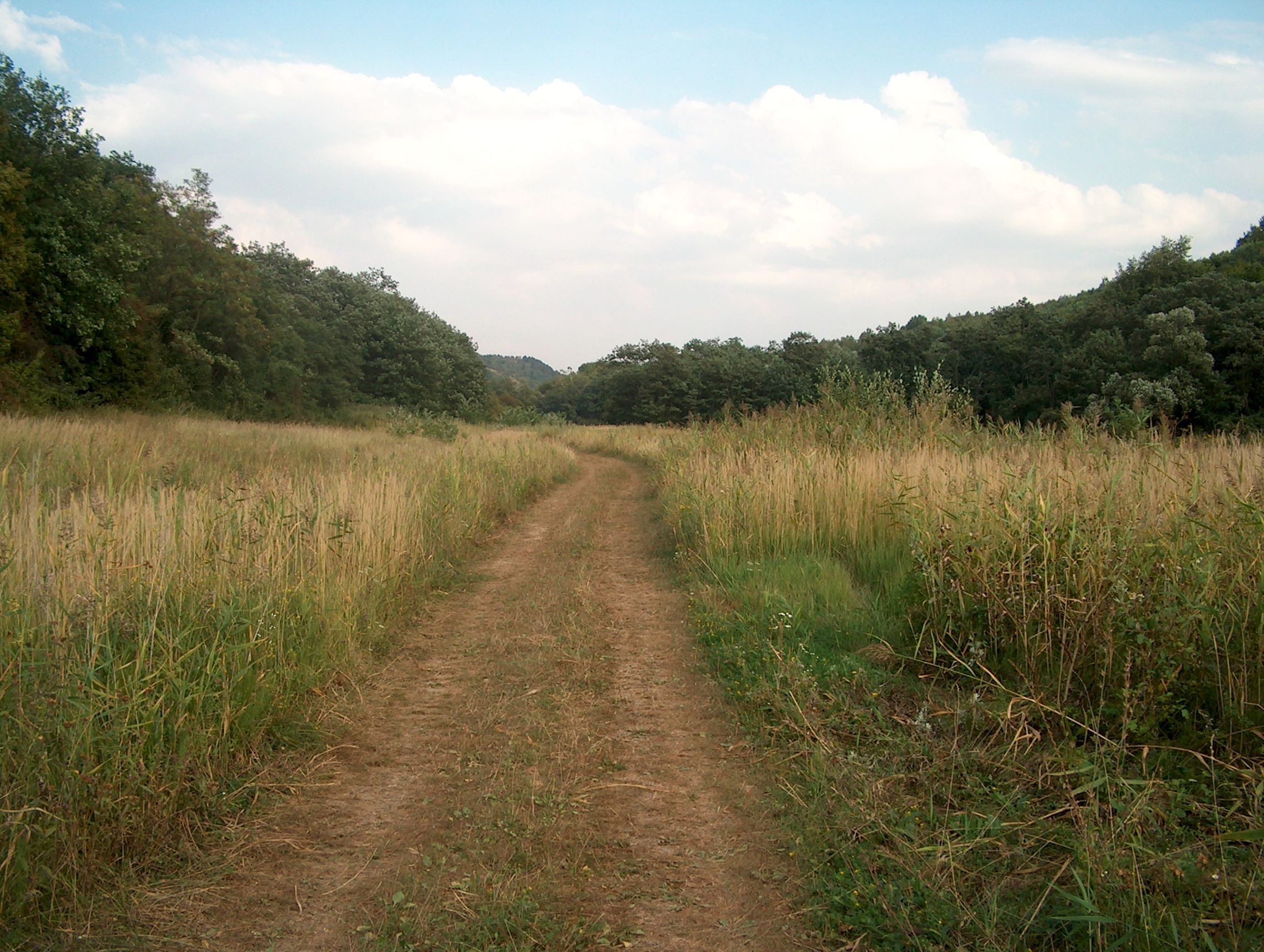
The road on Mighindoala river valley

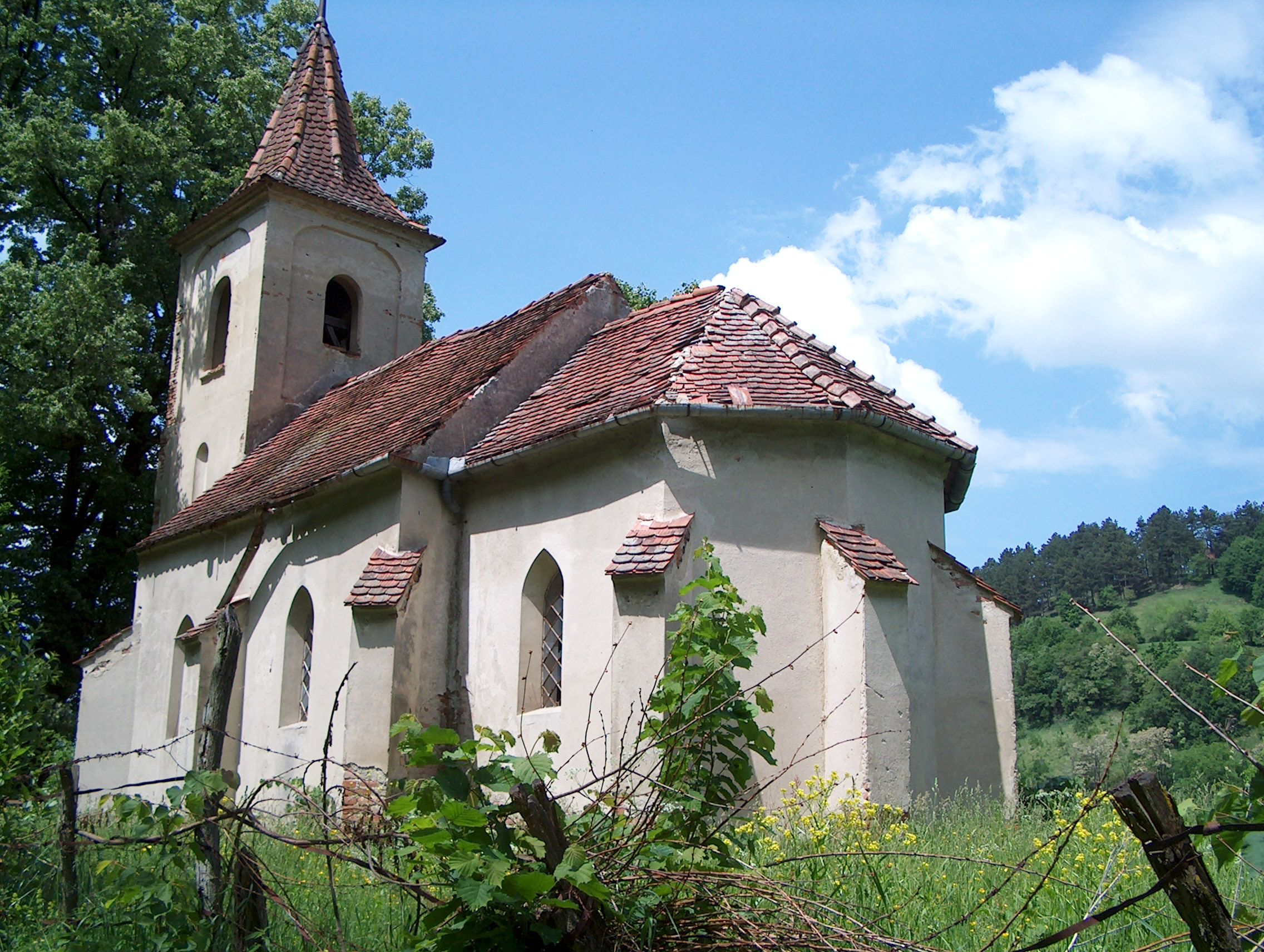
German Church in Mighindoala

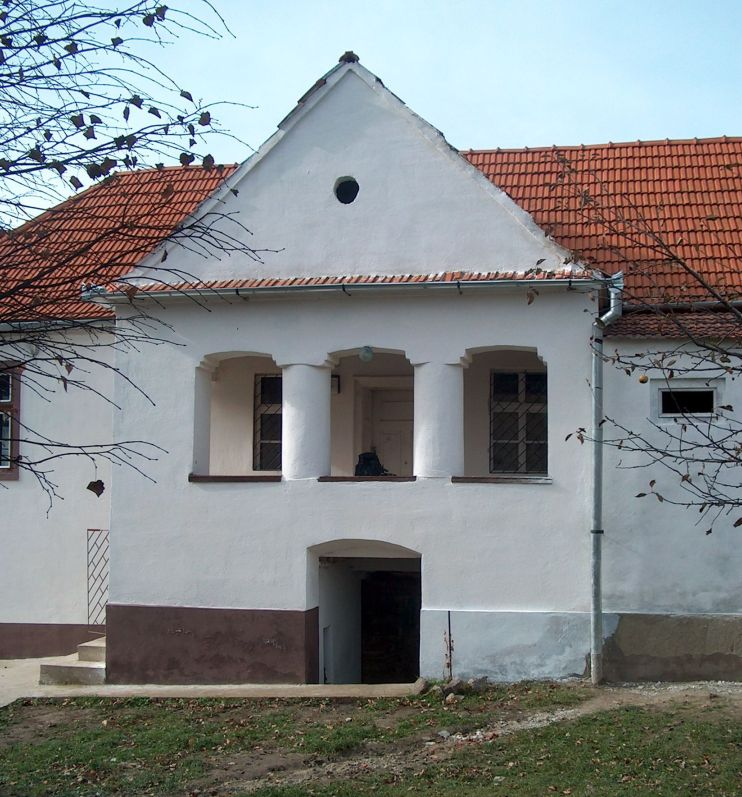
House in the village

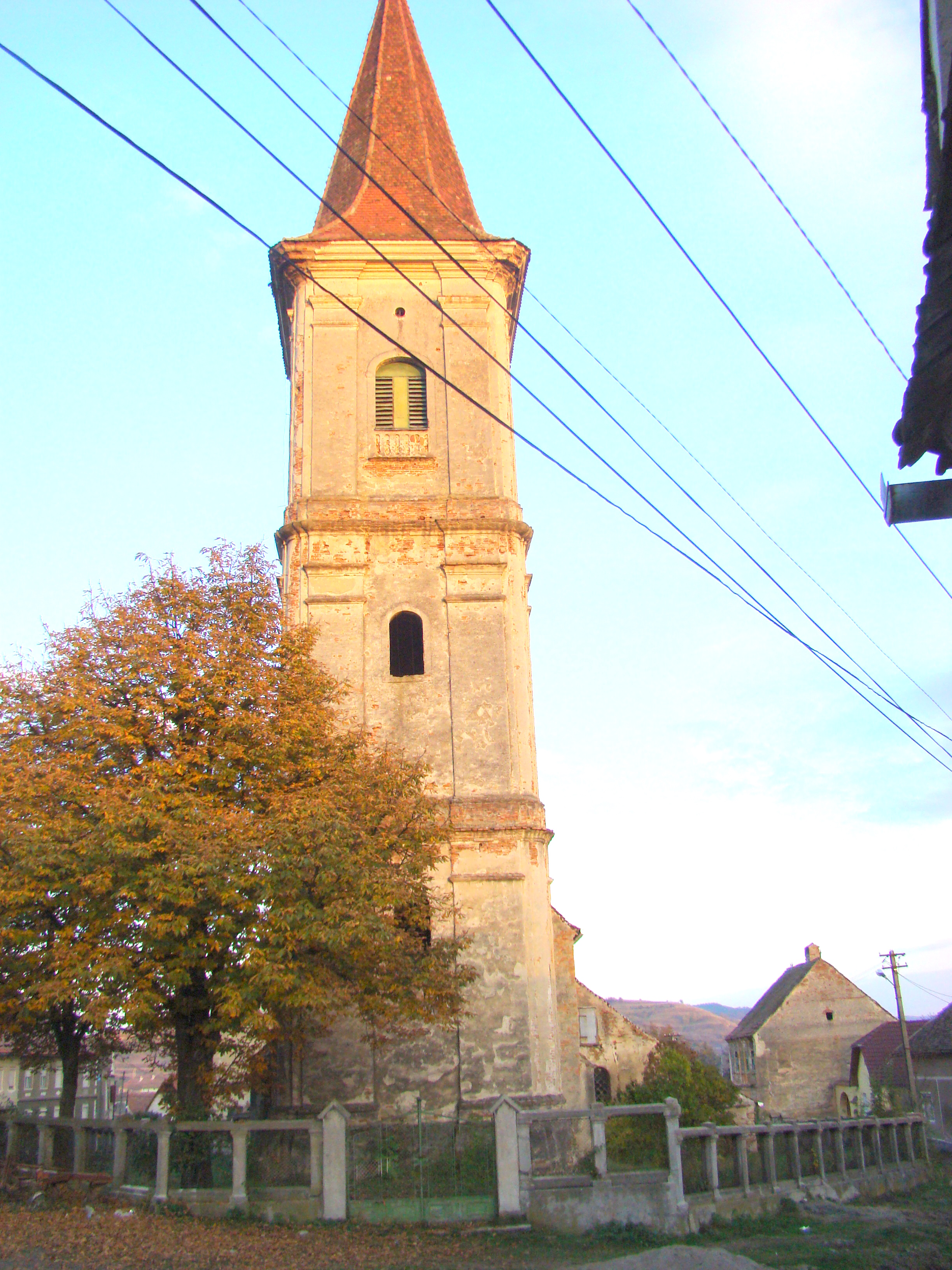
The fortified church of Șeica Mare

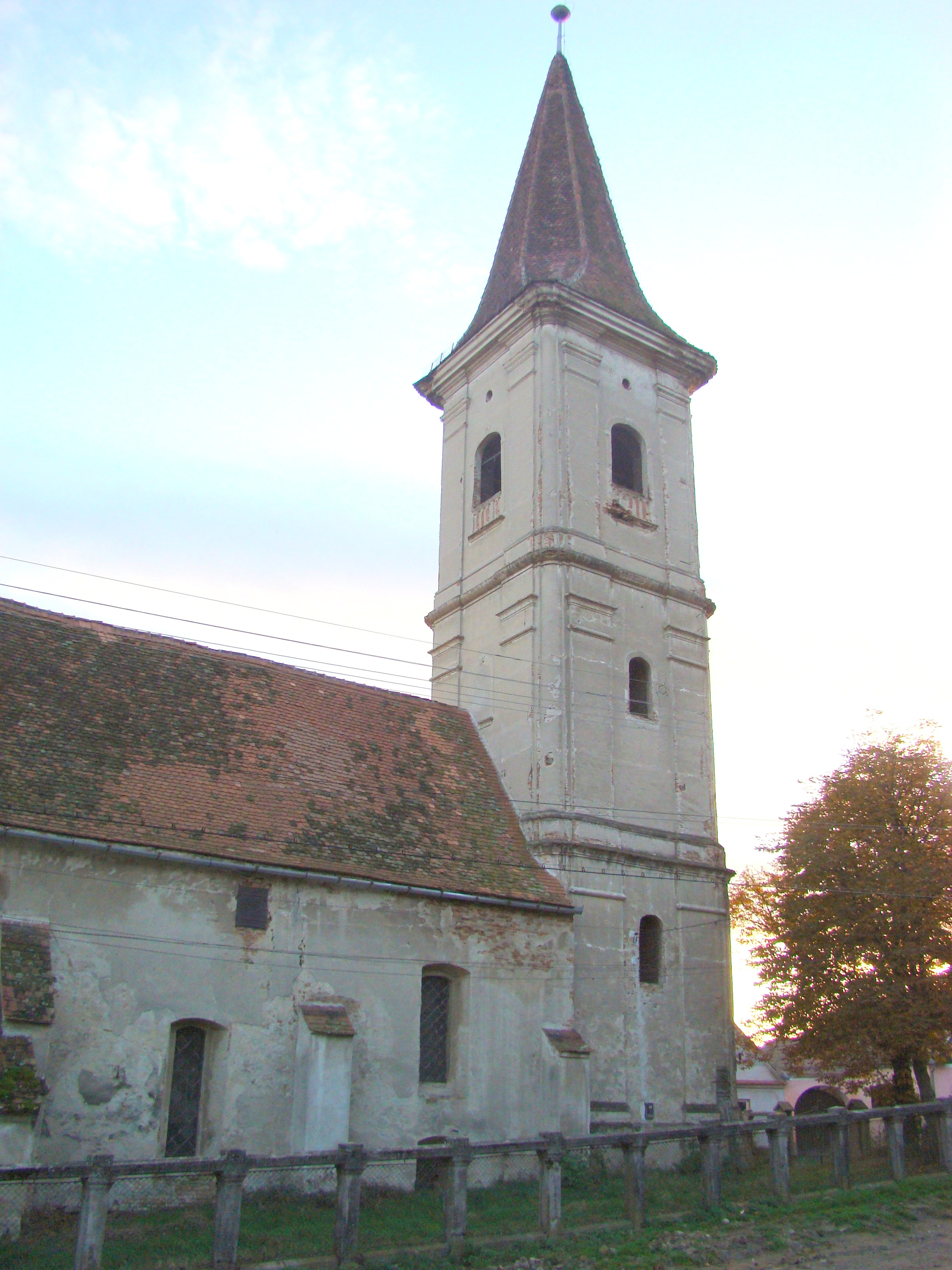
The fortified church of Șeica Mare

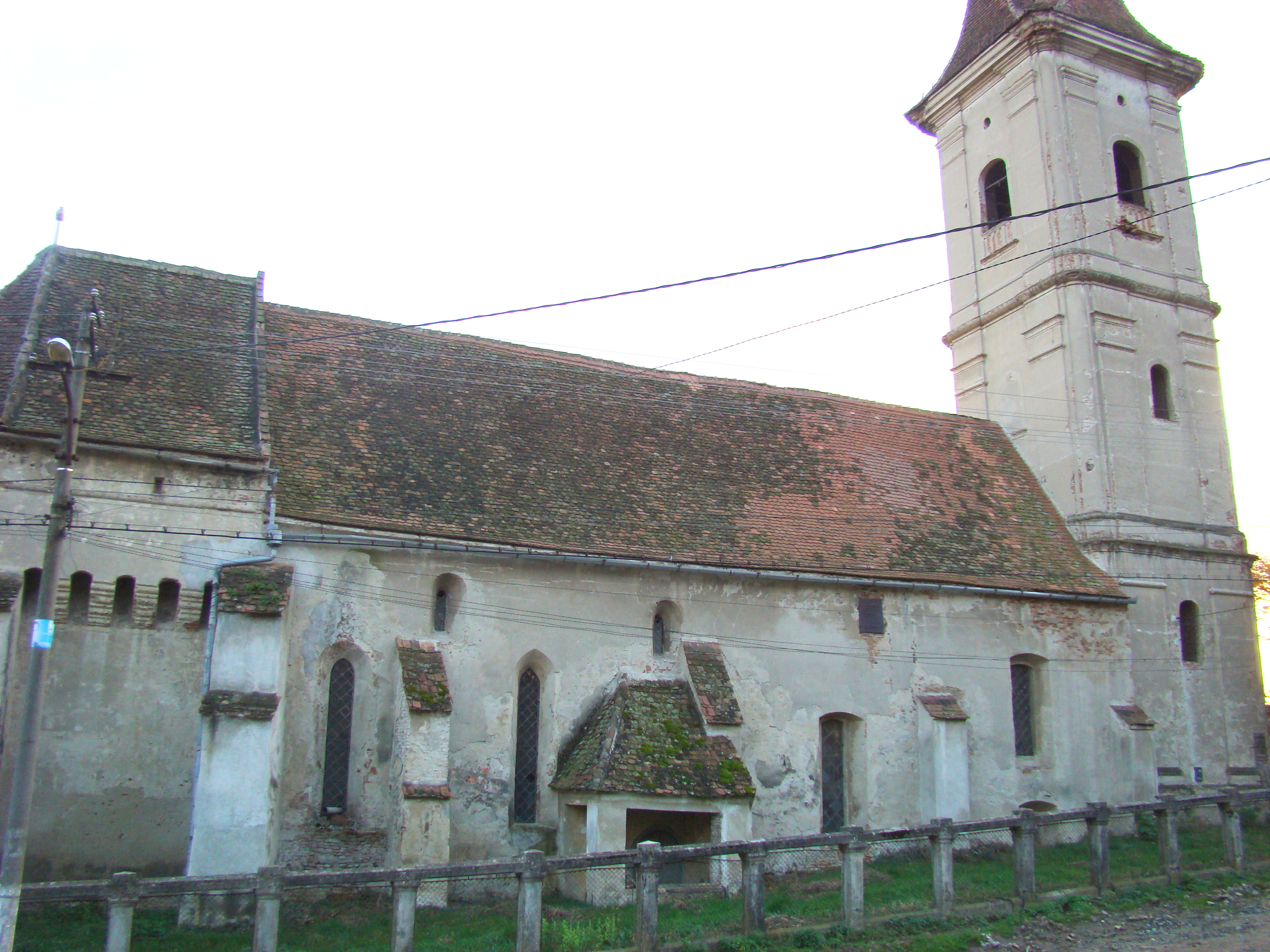
The fortified church of Șeica Mare

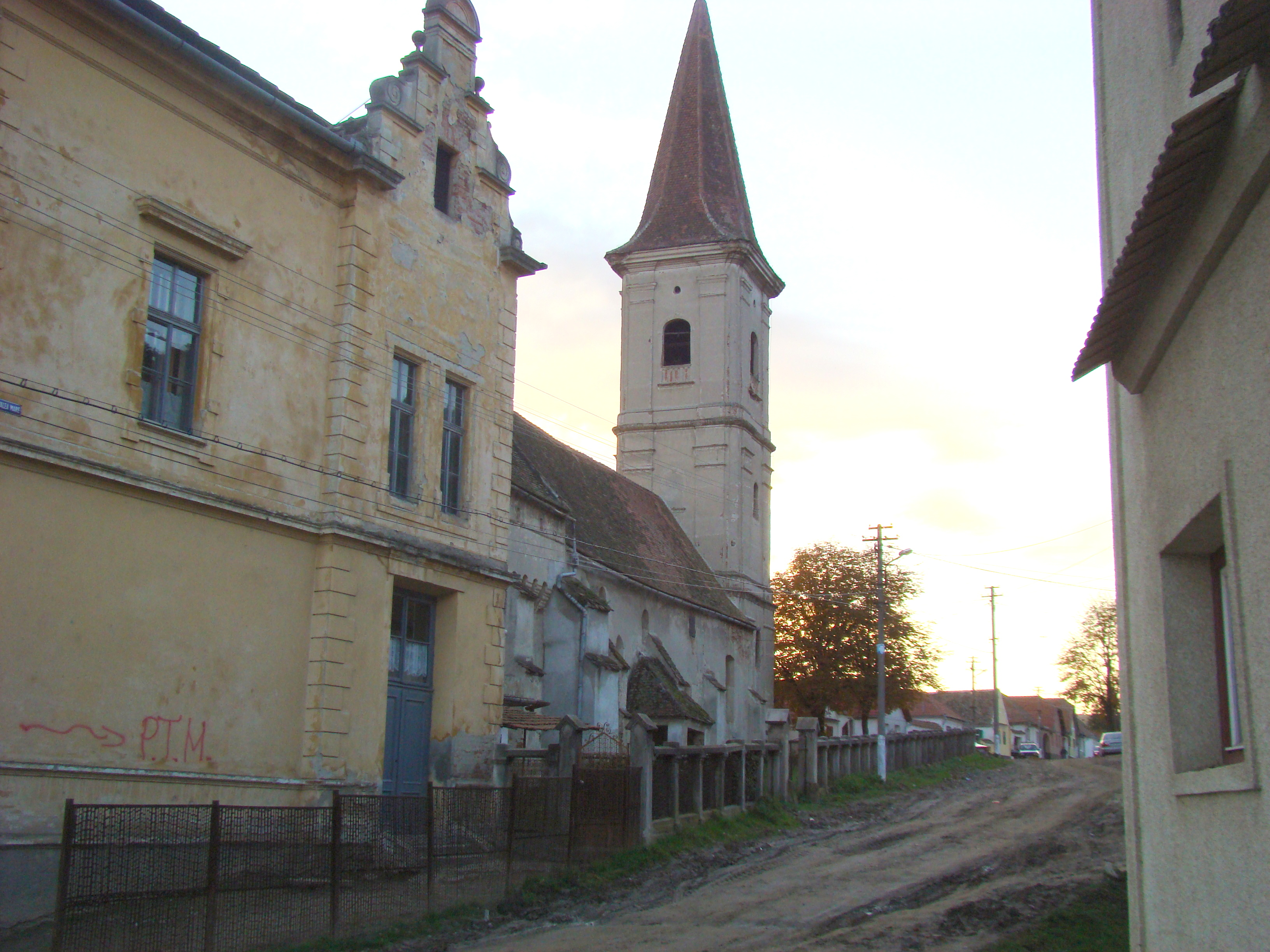
The fortified church of Șeica Mare

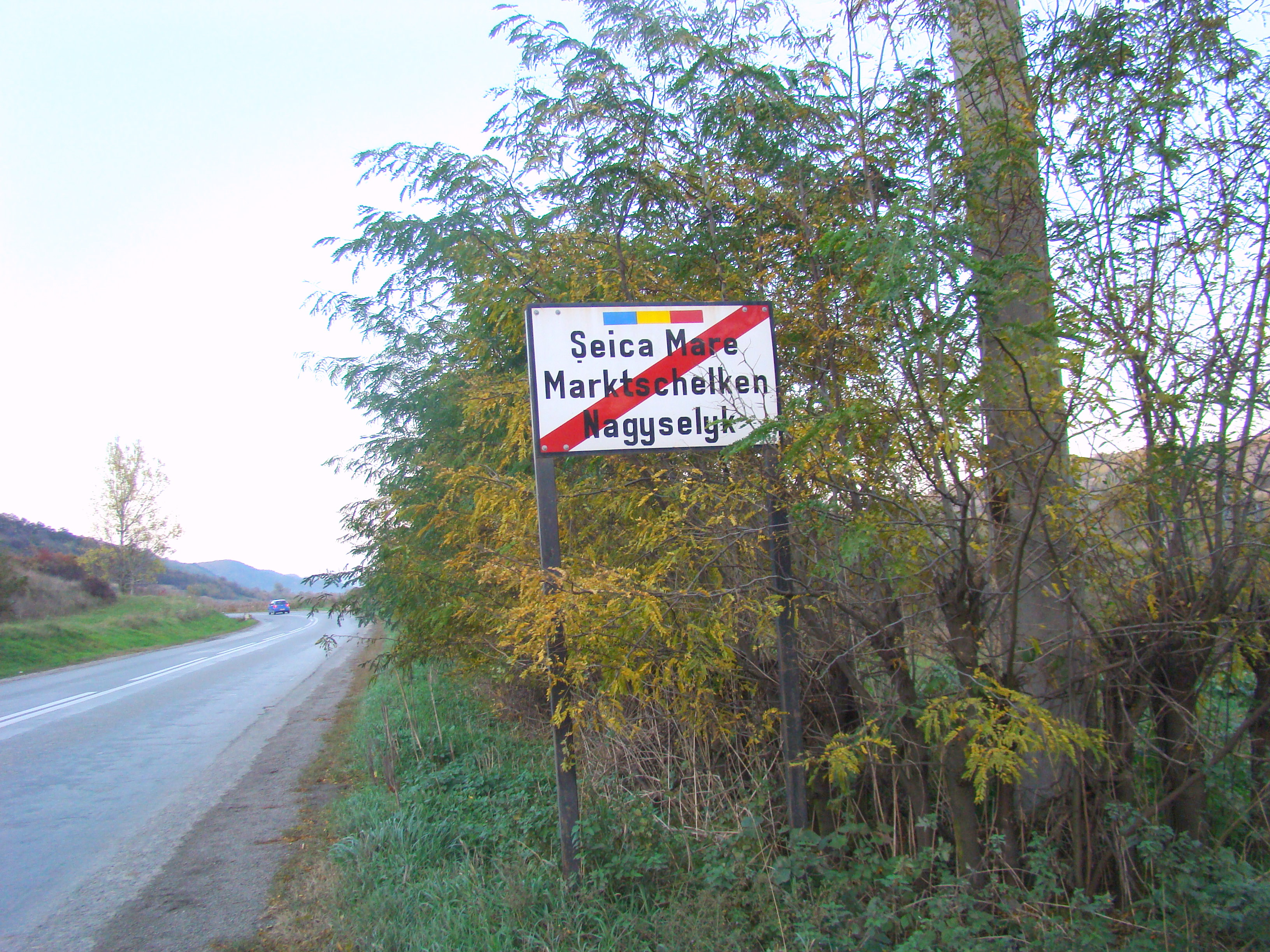
Route DN14 exiting Șeica Mare
