= Farkas Bolyai =

Hungarian mathematician (1775–1856)

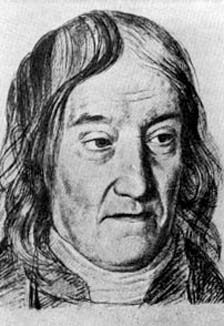
- Farkas Bolyai
- Born: 9 February 1775; Bólya, Kingdom of Hungary, Habsburg monarchy (now Buia as part of Șeica Mare, Romania)
- Died: 20 November 1856 (aged 81); Marosvásárhely, Kingdom of Hungary, Austrian Empire (now Târgu Mureş, Romania)
- Education: University of Jena; University of Göttingen
- Known for: Contributions to the foundations of geometry Wallace–Bolyai–Gerwien theorem
- Scientific career
- Fields: Mathematics
- Academic advisors: Abraham Gotthelf Kästner
- Notable students: János Bolyai

Farkas Bolyai (Hungarian: [ˈfɒrkɒʃ ˈboːjɒi]; 9 February 1775 – 20 November 1856; also known as Wolfgang Bolyai in Germany) was a Hungarian mathematician, mainly known for his work in geometry.

== Biography ==
Bolyai was born in Bólya, a village near Nagyszeben, Grand Principality of Transylvania, Kingdom of Hungary (now Buia, Sibiu County, Romania). His father was Gáspár Bolyai and his mother Krisztina Vajna. Farkas was taught at home by his father until the age of six when he was sent to the Calvinist school in Nagyszeben. His teachers recognized his talents in arithmetics and in learning languages. He learned Latin, Greek, Romanian, Hebrew and later also French, Italian and English. He easily multiplied, divided 13- or 14-digit numbers in his head, and was able to draw square and cubic roots from them. At the age of 12 he left school and was appointed as a tutor to the eight-year-old son of the count Kemény. This meant that Bolyai was now treated as a member of one of the leading families in the country, and he became not only a tutor but a real friend to the count's son. In 1790 Bolyai and his pupil both entered the Calvinist College in Kolozsvár (today Cluj-Napoca) where they spent five years.

The professor of philosophy at the college in Kolozsvár tried to turn Bolyai against mathematics and towards religious philosophy. Bolyai, however, decided to go abroad with Simon Kemény on an educational trip in 1796 and began to study mathematics systematically at German universities first at Jena and then at Göttingen. In these times Bolyai became a close friend of Carl Friedrich Gauss.

He returned home to Kolozsvár in 1799. It was there he met and married Zsuzsanna Benkő and where their son János Bolyai – later an even more famous mathematician than his father – was born in 1802. Soon thereafter he accepted a teaching position for mathematics and sciences at the Calvinist College in Marosvásárhely (today Târgu-Mureş), where he spent the rest of his life.

== Mathematical work ==
Bolyai's main interests were the foundations of geometry and the parallel axiom.

His main work, Tentamen juventutem studiosam in elementa matheseos purae, elementaris ac sublimioris, methodo intuitiva, evidentiaque huic propria, introducendi (An Attempt to Introduce Studious Youths to the Elements of Pure Mathematics; 1832), was an attempt at a rigorous and systematic foundation of geometry, arithmetic, algebra and analysis. In this work, he gave iterative procedures to solve equations which he then proved convergent by showing them to be monotonically increasing and bounded above. His study of the convergence of series includes a test equivalent to Raabe's test, which he discovered independently and at about the same time as Raabe. Other important ideas in the work include a general definition of a function and a definition of an equality between two plane figures if they can both be divided into a finite equal number of pairwise congruent pieces.

He first dissuaded his son from the study of non-Euclidean geometry, but by 1832 he became enthusiastic enough to persuade his son to publish his path-breaking thoughts. János's ideas were published an appendix to the Tentamen.
