= Copșa Mică works =

Two factories in Sibiu County, Romania

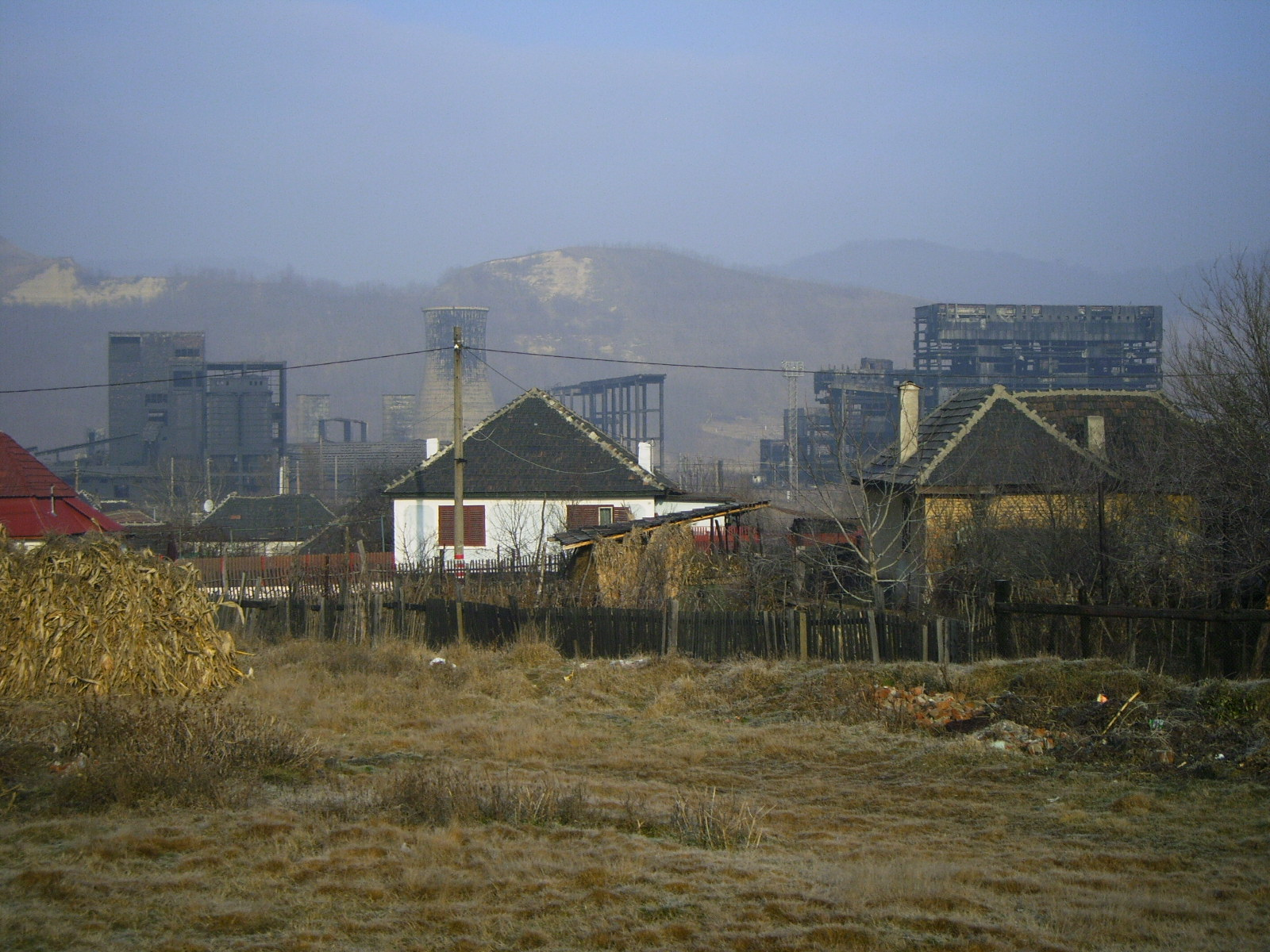
Remains of the Carbosin factory in the background, 2006

The Copșa Mică works were two factories in the Transylvanian town of Copșa Mică, Sibiu County, Romania. Sometra, established in 1939, produced non-ferrous metals, particularly zinc and lead, through smelting; production has been suspended since 2009. Carbosin, dating to 1935, specialized in carbon black, and shut down in 1993. The two were the town's principal employers, but combined, they made it among the most polluted places in Eastern Europe. Soot from Carbosin encased Copșa Mică in a black covering, while metals from Sometra suffused the air, water and soil, leading to serious health effects on surrounding residents, vegetation and wildlife.

== The factories ==
=== Sometra ===
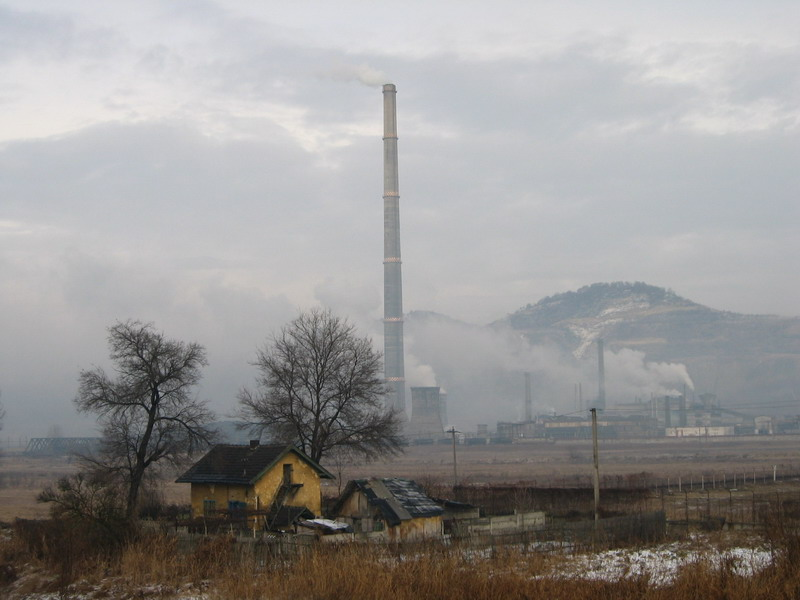
Sometra in operation, 2005

Sometra was founded as a private firm in 1939 for the purpose of zinc smelting. Initially, it had three distillation furnaces, with five more added in 1948, the year it was nationalized by the new communist regime. Its initial capacity was 3000 tons of zinc per year, expanded to 4000 tons in 1946. Between 1950 and 1960, capacity was gradually expanded to 28,000 tons a year. In 1955, a unit for producing sulfuric acid was inaugurated. The unit was expanded in 1966, a year that also saw the introduction of a system for agglomerating concentrates of zinc and lead. This was the culmination of a four-year program of thorough restructuring and modernization, with the new equipment having a capacity of 30,000 tons of zinc and 20,000 tons of lead bullion per year. The 1967-1970 period saw the introduction of an electrolytic lead refining system (capacity 24,000 tons a year); a unit for extracting metallic bismuth for technical and pharmaceutical use from anode sludge, as well as gold and silver alloys and antimony slag; a unit for zinc sulfate production; a unit for zinc and ammonium chloride production; and an air preheater. Capacity was doubled between 1975 and 1984. A second zinc and lead extraction unit, with annual capacities of 30,000 tons (zinc) and 20,000 tons (lead) went online, as well as two thermal zinc refineries and greater cadmium refining. In 1983, metallic antimony production began by extracting the metal from slag, along with sodium thioantimoniate and stibnite. In 1984, a second blast furnace began operation, so that the old components built from 1939 to 1957 were retired. Between 1985 and 1989, zinc powder production began and a system for collecting residual gases was put in place. In 1988, a 250 m high chimney was built. By 1989, the plant was annually generating 43,490 tons of sulfuric acid (against a projected capacity of 126,000 tons), 23,519 tons of electrolytic lead (below the 38,000 tons projected), 29,840 tons of pure zinc, 2,094 tons of zinc powder, 19 tons of cadmium, 29 tons of bismuth and 195 tons of antimony.

The communist regime, which considered the factory crucial to the national economy and did not export its products, collapsed in 1989. Starting in 1990, production continuously fell, reaching 25% of its former level. However, output recovered to 1989 levels in some categories in 1995-1996. Starting in late 1992, efforts at updating the plant were made, including better gas purification at the agglomeration unit and blast furnace, completion of the tall chimney and a new dust filtration and water recirculation system. By 1997, some 40% of employees were laid off. The firm was privatized in 1998 when it was sold to Mytilineos Holdings. It was the country's only producer of lead and zinc concentrate. In early 2009, during the Great Recession, due to a major fall in zinc and lead orders, 80% of employees or over 700 people were laid off. The remainder were kept on for equipment maintenance, and the factory was temporarily shut down. Including their dependents, this measure affected nearly a third of the town's inhabitants, as well as provoking significant losses to the town budget.

Over the years, the company has been known as Sonemin, U.C.M., 21 Decembrie and I.M.M.N., acquiring the Sometra name in 1991.

=== Carbosin ===
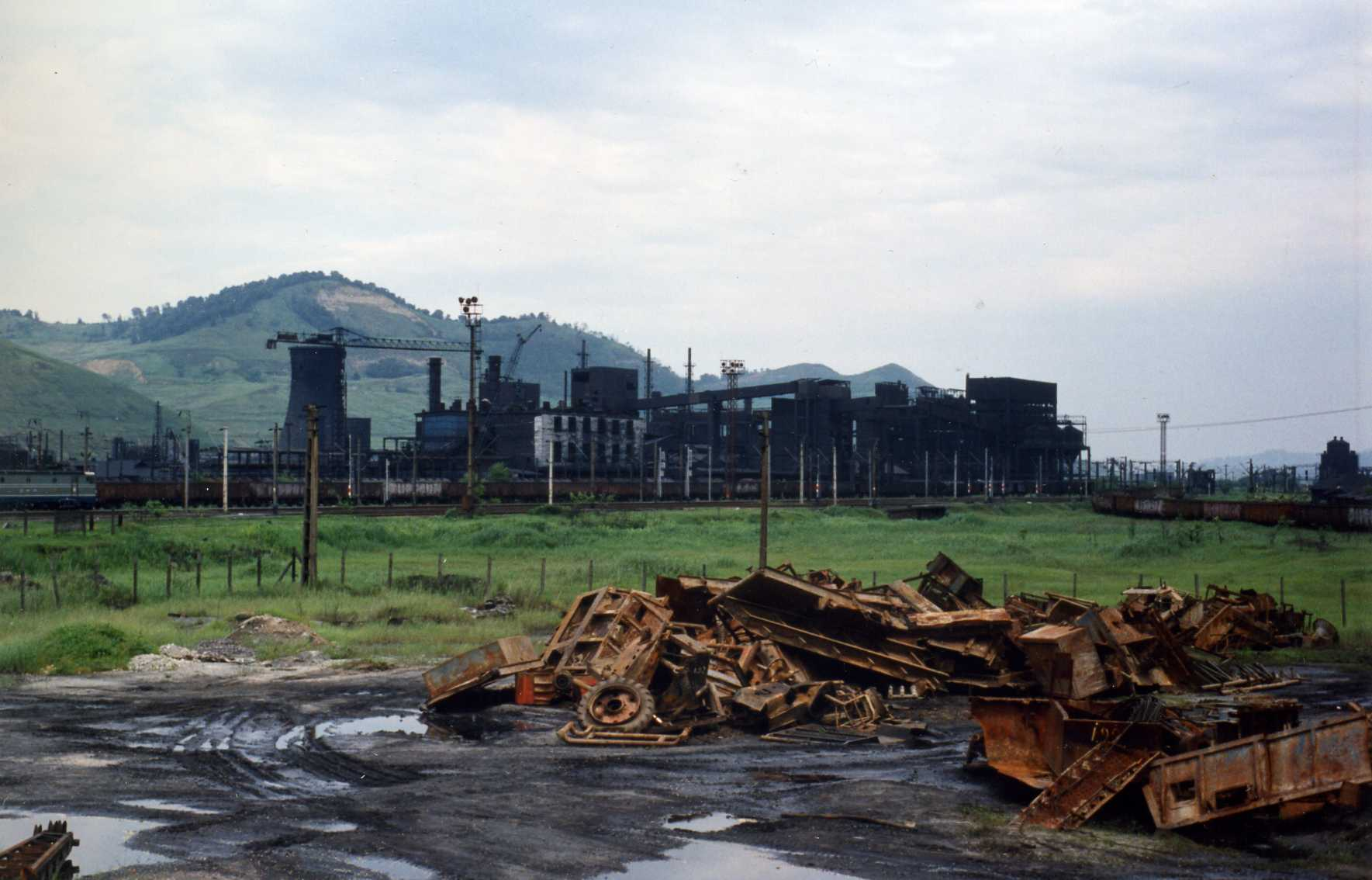
Abandoned Carbosin, 1996

Carbosin was founded in 1935, mainly for producing carbon black from methane gas. The government of Czechoslovakia invested in the enterprise in order to develop its defense capabilities, ordering munitions and arms for its infantry. In 1939, following the German occupation, the 20% interest of Československá zbrojovka was taken over by the Nazi regime, contributing to the crippling of Romania's efforts to maintain an army outside German control.

From 1950 to 1970, new units for producing carbon black were set up, as well as for formic and oxalic acid and methyl methacrylate. The company's products were the chief raw materials for various objects made of rubber (tires, transmission belts, conveyor belts, protective clothes and shoes), but were also used in the chemical, pharmaceutical, agricultural and other industries. The output of various types of carbon black amounted to 24,400 tons in 1989 (63,000 tons had been projected), a number that steadily decreased until 1993, when the factory was shut down following lengthy negotiations. Black dust pollution affected a strip of land over 20 km in length and 5–6 km in width, although work was later done to clean this up.

== Environmental impact ==
By the early 1990s, Copșa Mică was among the most polluted towns in Eastern Europe. Over 60 years of unrestricted emissions led to lower air quality, surface water contamination, soil pollution, contaminated plant products and health risks to farm animals and human inhabitants. Until operations were suspended, Sometra remained the area's chief polluter, its emissions of sulfur dioxide and dust affecting all aspects of the environment. A March 1990 report in The New York Times describes the town: "For about 15 miles around, every growing thing in this once-gentle valley looks as if it has been dipped in ink. Trees and bushes are black; the grass is stained. The houses and streets look like the inside of a chimney. Even the sheep on the hillsides are a dingy gray." Horses could only live there for two years, and the only animal life in the immediate area were wildfowl, the meat of which was inedible from the toxins.

In 1977, 70 residents had excessive or dangerous lead levels, a figure that had risen to over 400 by 1990, when over half of Sometra employees had above-normal lead. One test of nearly 3000 residents showed over half had lead poisoning. From 1983 to 1993, some 2000 people were hospitalized due to lead-induced anemia or severe lung and stomach pains. Of local children aged two to fourteen, 96% had chronic bronchitis and respiratory problems. Studies of children seven to twelve years old from Copșa Mică and Mediaș found that many showed signs of intellectual disability, two-thirds were underweight and 30% of boys and nearly half of girls had high blood pressure. Five babies were born with malformed hearts between 1977 and 1983, a number that rose to 16 in 1988 alone. In 1985, a local doctor wrote a detailed report that ended up in the hands of dictator Nicolae Ceaușescu, earning him a visit from the Securitate secret police and leading to construction of the tall chimney that spewed sulfuric emissions toward nearby villages. Residents were dependent on the factory for their livelihood, saw the pollution as part of reality and were reluctant to agitate for change.

=== Effect on vegetation ===
Local authorities became aware of damage to vegetation caused by the factories by the early 1960s, a phenomenon that widened and intensified over time. In 1961, some 100 ha of trees, those in direct proximity to the sources of pollution, were afflicted. This figure had risen to 1650 ha by 1973 and nearly 8000 ha in 1978. Studies in 1988 and 1999 revealed that the entirety of the forests managed from Mediaș were polluted—20,110 ha in the earlier study, or 17,247 ha in 1999, following the transfer of two parcels to Dumbrăveni. Starting in 1988, pollution was also observed in neighboring forest districts: Dumbrăveni (947 ha), Agnita (60 ha), Blaj (8,900 ha), so that over 30,000 ha were polluted, a number that remained constant in 1999. The intensity of damage also grew. In 1973, 120 ha of Mediaș forests fell into the category of most severe damage. This grew to 900 ha in 1978, nearly 2600 ha in 1988 and over 4500 ha in 1999. The Micăsasa and Târnava forests are the most polluted, the Șeica Mică and Boian ones less so, and those at Dârlos the least.

Natural regrowth of forests has been made more difficult in the least polluted areas, while in the severely to moderately polluted zones, it had stopped completely or was trending in that direction by 2008. Planting trees, even with additional costs such as fertilizer, has not always been successful either, due to soil contamination and elevated acidity. For instance, between 1994 and 1998, planting yielded a success rate of between 12 and 95%. Erosion, landslides and repeated fires have taken place, and trees' beneficial effects on climate, water and air quality have been seriously diminished or eliminated.

Replanting of intensely polluted soil started in 1988 and by 2008, 644 ha had been replanted, with the Black Locust proving especially well adapted, among other species. Upon privatization of Sometra in 1998, the government, in accordance with a 1995 law, stipulated that fourteen steps would have to be taken by 2002. These would lessen the plant's environmental impact by reducing gas and toxic dust emissions. One step was to plant 40-50 ha of trees on the banks of the Târnava Mare River; trees paid for by the company were planted on 35 ha between 2000 and 2003. With Sometra shuttered, the year 2010 marked the first since measurements were taken that air pollution did not exceed legal limits. Plants began to regrow in forests that were shrinking as late as 2001. Whereas moles and hedgehogs had disappeared and rabbits and deer had migrated to cleaner areas, rabbits, foxes, wild boars and deer later returned. Isolated honeybee colonies and other insect species also reappeared.

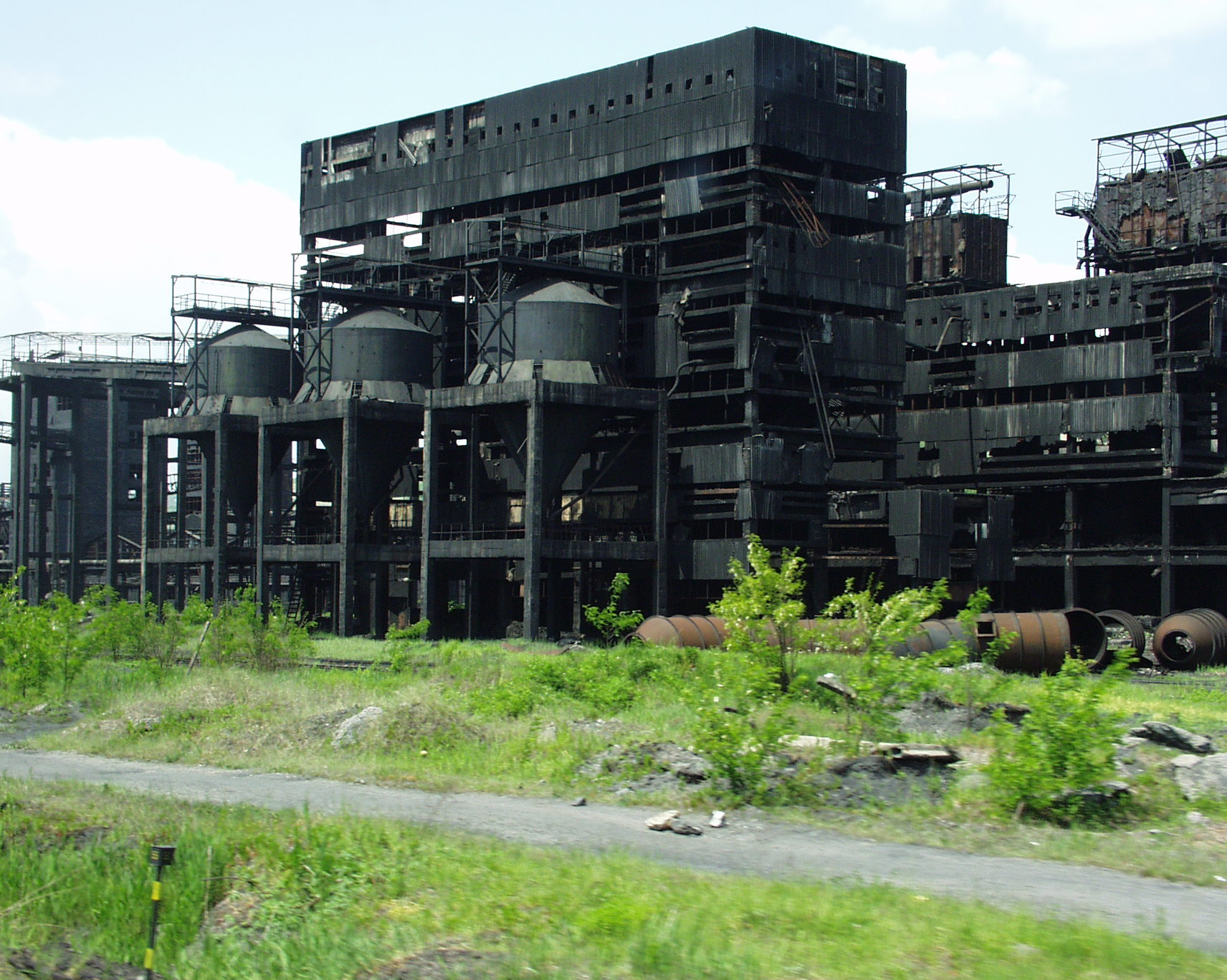
Carbosin in 2002

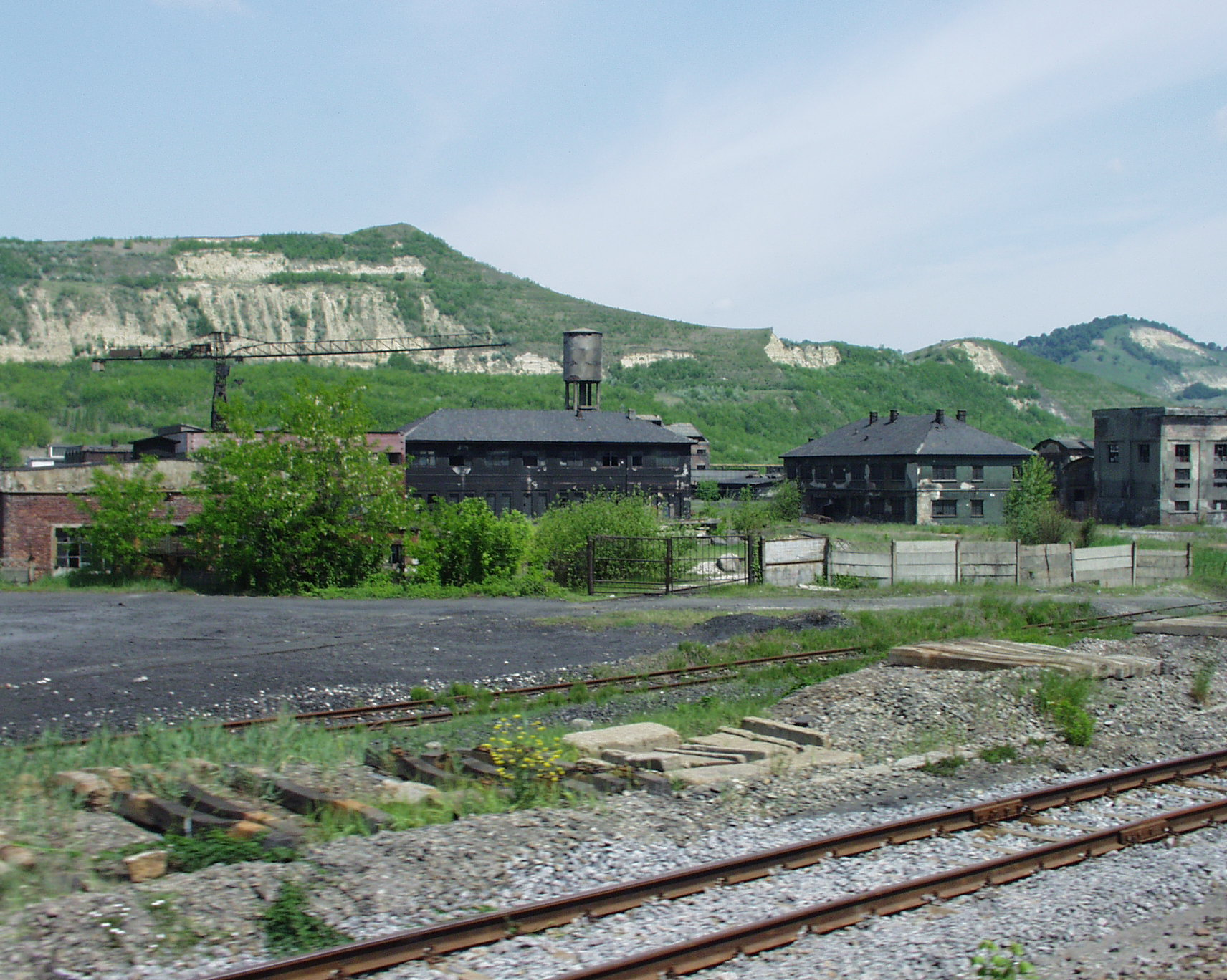
Soot-blackened buildings in 2002

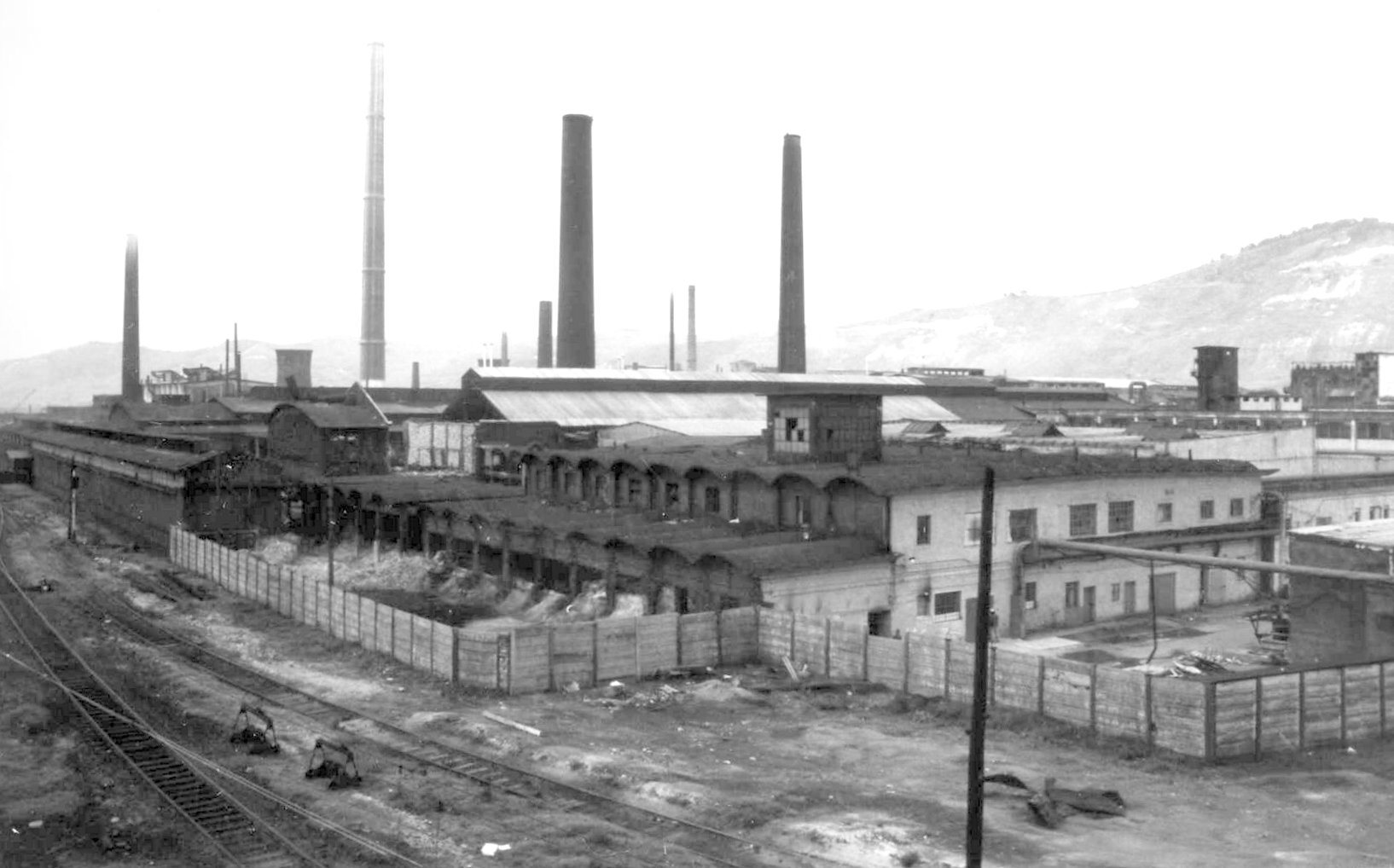
Sometra in 1994

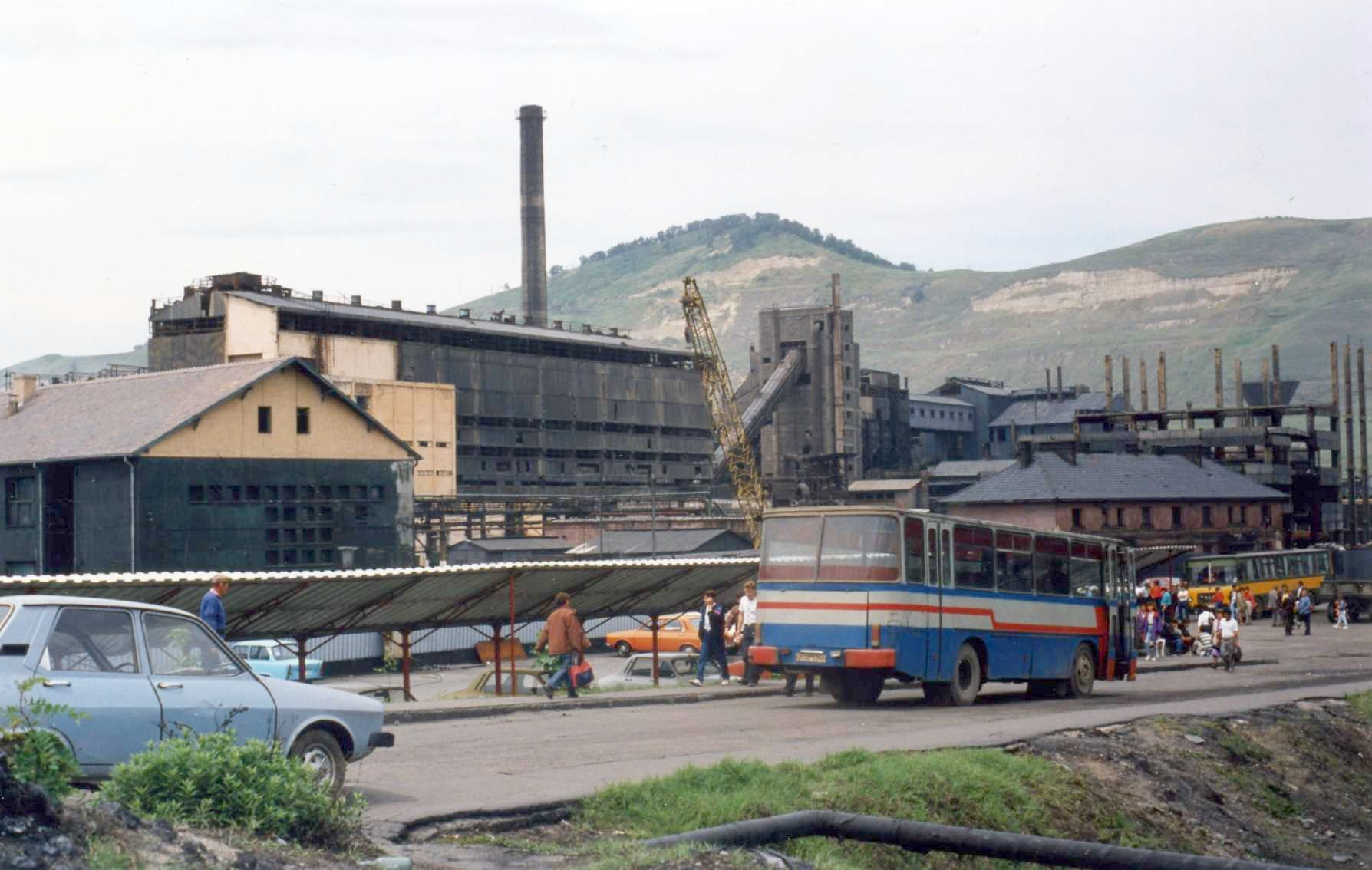
Shift change at Sometra, 1996
