= Slimnic =

- Commune
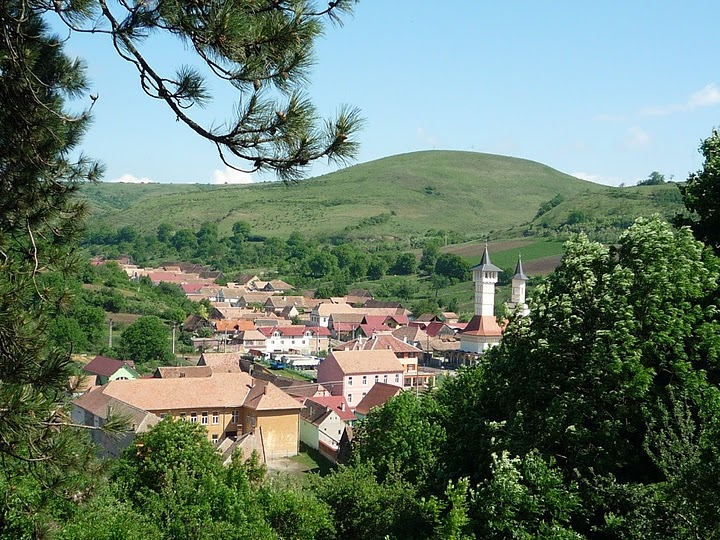
- Slimnic, viewed from the citadel

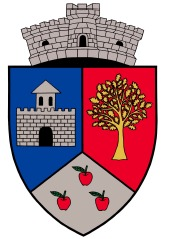
- Coat of arms

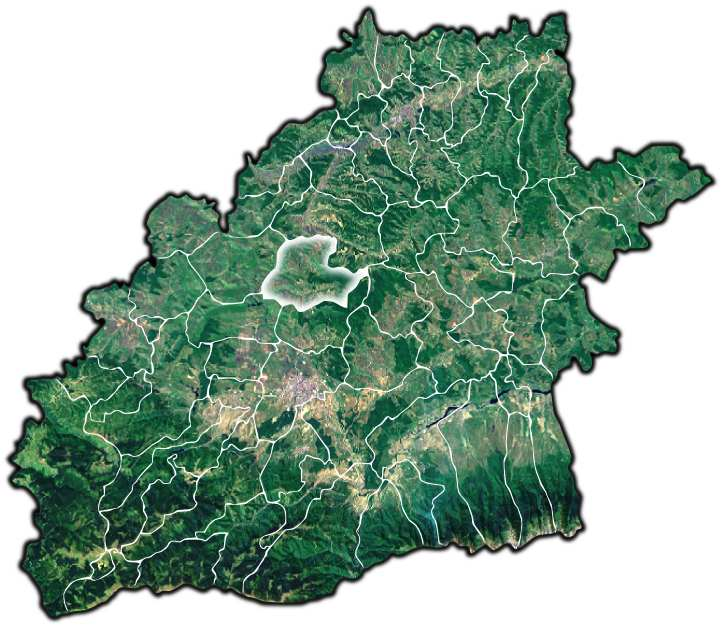
- Location in Sibiu County

- Location in Romania
- Coordinates: 45°55′N 24°10′E
- Country: Romania
- County: Sibiu

Government
  - Mayor (2024–2028): Aron-Adrian Nan (PNL)
- Area: 106.24 km^{2} (41.02 sq mi)
- Elevation: 439 m (1,440 ft)
- Population (2021-12-01): 3,459
  - Density: 32.56/km^{2} (84.33/sq mi)
- Time zone: UTC+02:00 (EET)
  - Summer (DST): UTC+03:00 (EEST)
- Postal code: 557240
- Area code: (+40) 02 69
- Vehicle reg.: SB
- Website: primariaslimnic.ro

Slimnic (German: Stolzenburg; Hungarian: Szelindek) is a commune located in Sibiu County, Transylvania, Romania. It is composed of five villages: Albi (Álgyitelep), Pădureni (Erdeiházak), Ruși (Reußen bei Mediasch; Rüsz), Slimnic, and Veseud (Wassid; Szászvessződ). Slimnic and Ruși villages have fortified churches. Slimnic village also has a medieval citadel.

The commune is situated on the Transylvanian Plateau, at an altitude of 439 m (1,440 ft), on the banks of the river Slimnic. It is located in the central part of the county, 15 km (9.3 mi) north of the county seat, Sibiu. Slimnic is crossed by national road DN14, which starts in Sibiu, goes through Mediaș, and ends in Sighișoara.

Historical population
Year	Pop.	±%
1850	3,995	—
1900	4,661	+16.7%
1941	5,851	+25.5%
1977	5,641	−3.6%
1992	3,683	−34.7%
2002	3,670	−0.4%
2011	3,581	−2.4%
2021	3,459	−3.4%
Source:Census Database

At the 2021 census, the commune had a population of 3,459; of those, 88.84% were Romanians and 1.1% Roma.
