= Slimnic (Vișa) =

- Location within Romania

Location
- Country: Romania
- Counties: Sibiu County
- Villages: Slimnic

Physical characteristics
- Mouth: Vișa
  - location: Mândra
  - coordinates: 45.9241°N 24.0758°E
- Length: 15 km (9.3 mi)
- Basin size: 59 km^{2} (23 sq mi)

Basin features
- Progression: Vișa→ Târnava Mare→ Târnava→ Mureș→ Tisza→ Danube→ Black Sea
- Tributaries
  - left: Șarba

The Slimnic is a right tributary of the river Vișa in Romania. It flows into the Vișa in Mândra. Its length is 15 km (9.3 mi) and its basin size is 59 km^{2} (23 sq mi). Its largest tributary is the Șarba, from the left.
