= Buia =

Buia is a surname. Notable people with the surname include:

- Aurica Buia (born 1970), Romanian long-distance runner
- Darius Buia (born 1994), Romanian footballer
- Romulus Buia (born 1970), Romanian football player and manager

== See also ==
- British United Island Airways
