= Copșa Mică =

- Town
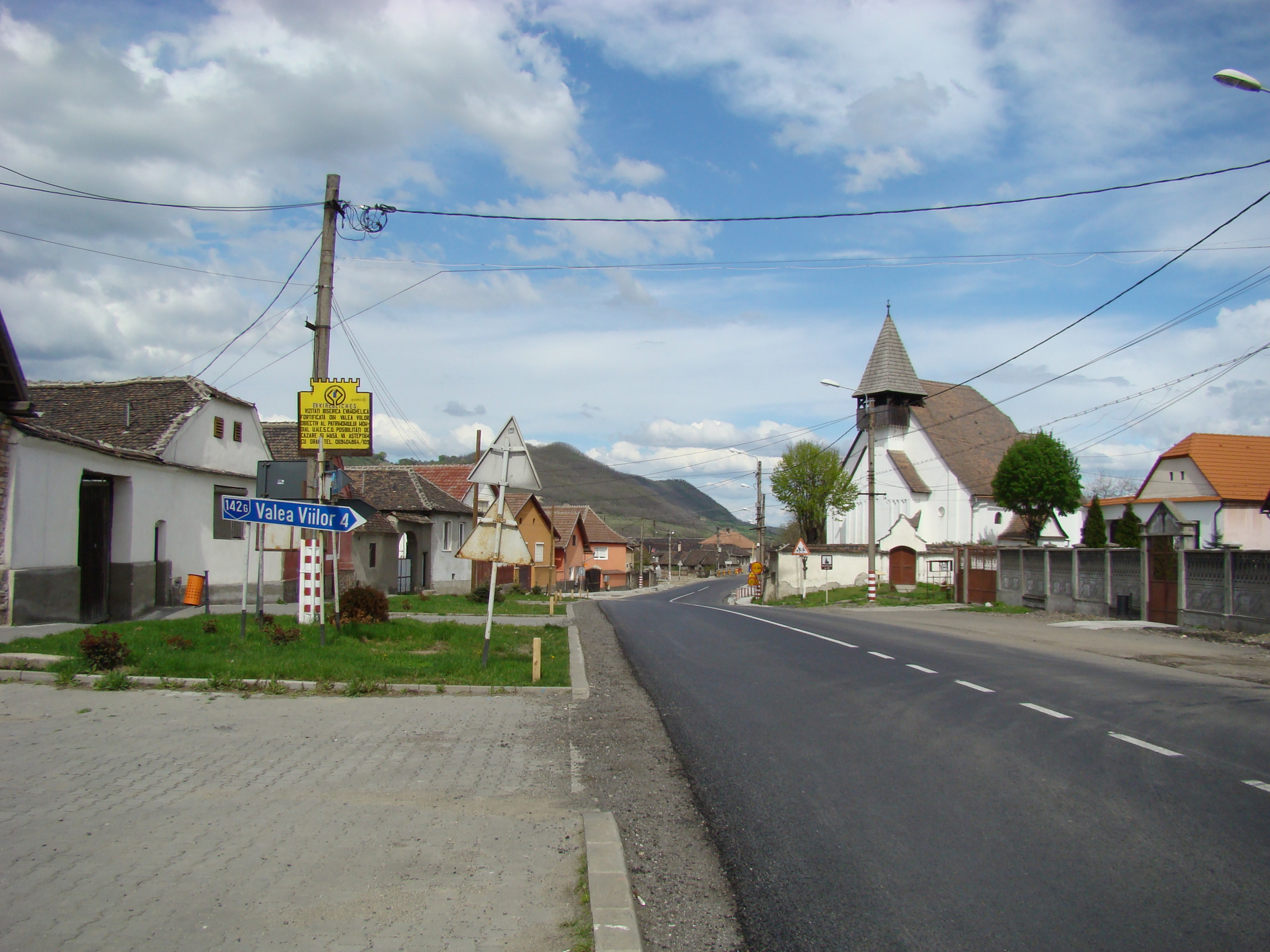
- Evangelical Lutheran church of the local German community (Transylvanian Saxons)

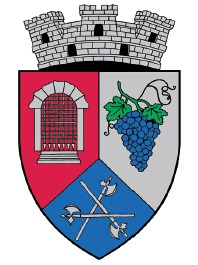
- Coat of arms

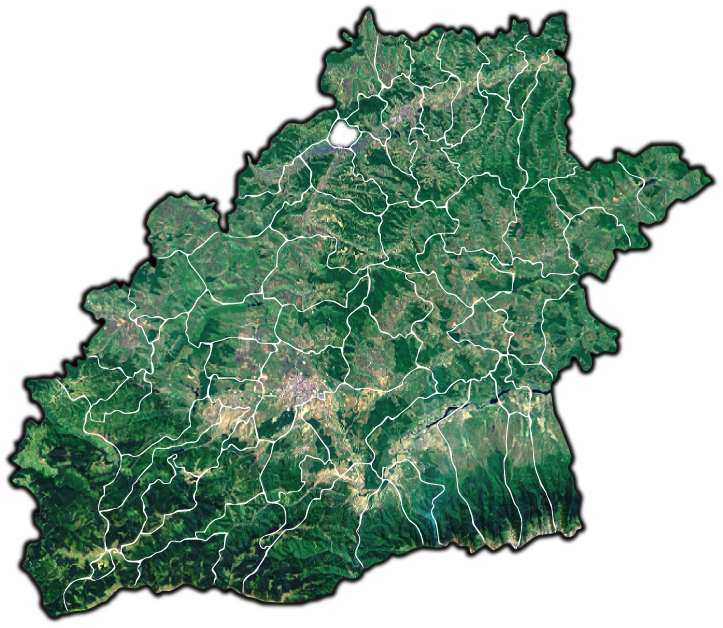
- Location in Sibiu County

- Location in Romania
- Coordinates: 46°6′45″N 24°13′50″E
- Country: Romania
- County: Sibiu

Government
  - Mayor (2024–2028): Nicolae-Bogdan Tăpălagă (PNL)
- Area: 25.90 km^{2} (10.00 sq mi)
- Elevation: 295 m (968 ft)
- Population (2021-12-01): 4,570
  - Density: 176/km^{2} (457/sq mi)
- Time zone: UTC+02:00 (EET)
  - Summer (DST): UTC+03:00 (EEST)
- Postal code: 555400
- Area code: (+40) 02 69
- Vehicle reg.: SB
- Website: www.copsa-mica.ro

Copșa Mică (German: Kleinkopisch; Hungarian: Kiskapus) is a town in Sibiu County, Transylvania, Romania, located north of Sibiu, 33 km east of Blaj, and 12 km southwest of Mediaș. It is on the route of the Via Transilvanica long-distance trail.

== Economy ==
=== The Copșa Mică gas field ===
The Copșa Mică gas field is a natural gas field located in the town. Discovered in 1915 and developed by Romgaz, it began production in 1920 and produces natural gas and condensates. On July 13, 1933, the biggest fire in the history of Romania occurred at a gas well here, with the flames reaching a height of 150 m (490 ft). The fire was put out by the military after 7 years, and completely extinguished only in 1947.

=== The Copșa Mică works ===
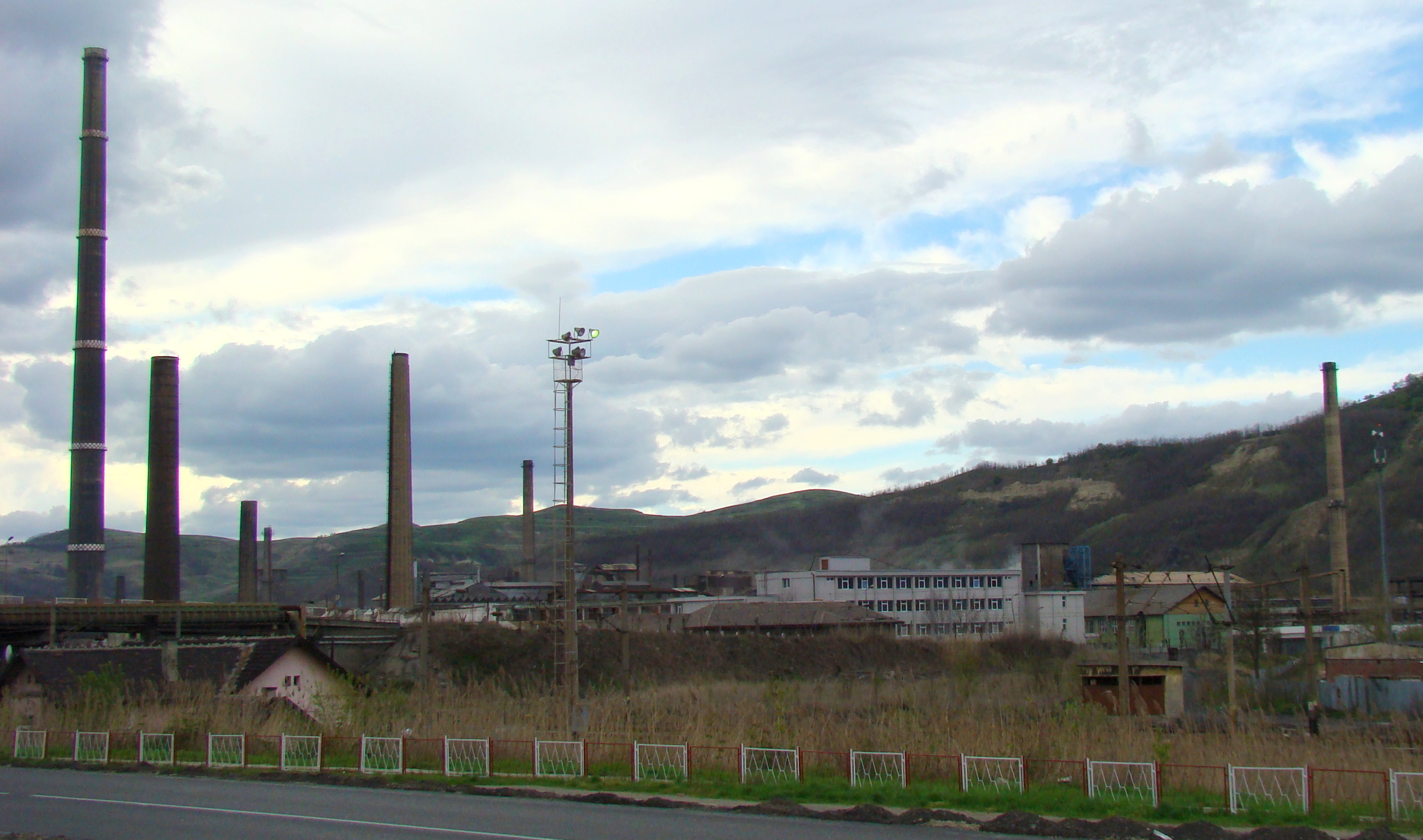
Industrial platform in Copșa Mică

The 1933 fire at the gas field led to the creation of a carbon black factory at Copșa Mică. The town is best known for its status (dating to the 1990s) as one of the most polluted in Europe; in fact, at some point it was the second most polluted after Chernobyl.

This was due to the emissions of two factories in the area:

- Carbosin, open from 1935 to 1993, produced carbon black for dyes; its emissions permeated the area for nearly sixty years, leaving soot on homes, trees, animals, and everything else in the area. The stain from these decades of deposits are still visible.
- The other source of the pollution, less visible but with even more serious effects to the health of the town's residents, was Sometra, a smelter whose emissions have contributed to significantly higher incidence of lung disease and impotence, along with a life expectancy nine years below Romania's average.

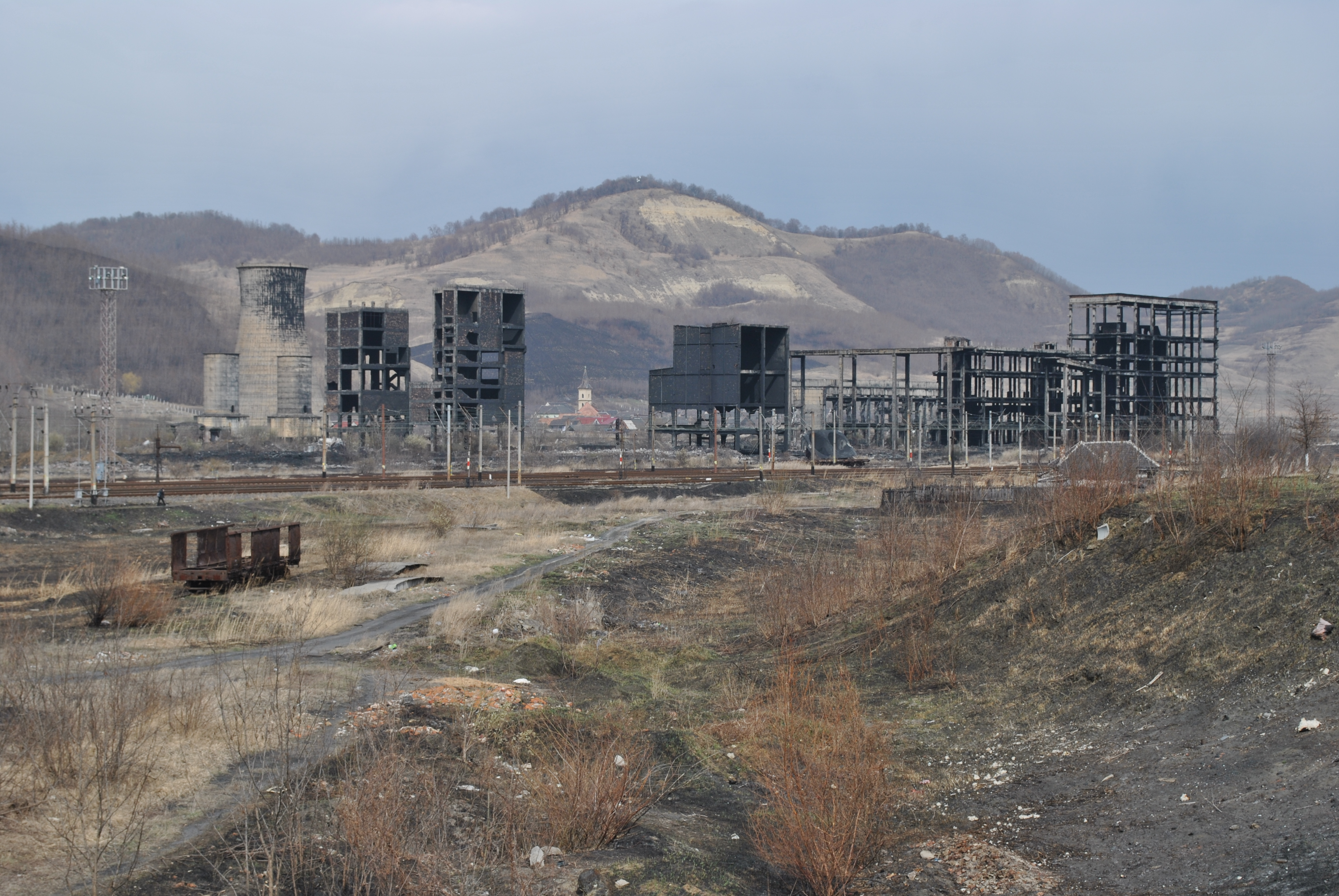
Remains of the Carbosin factory

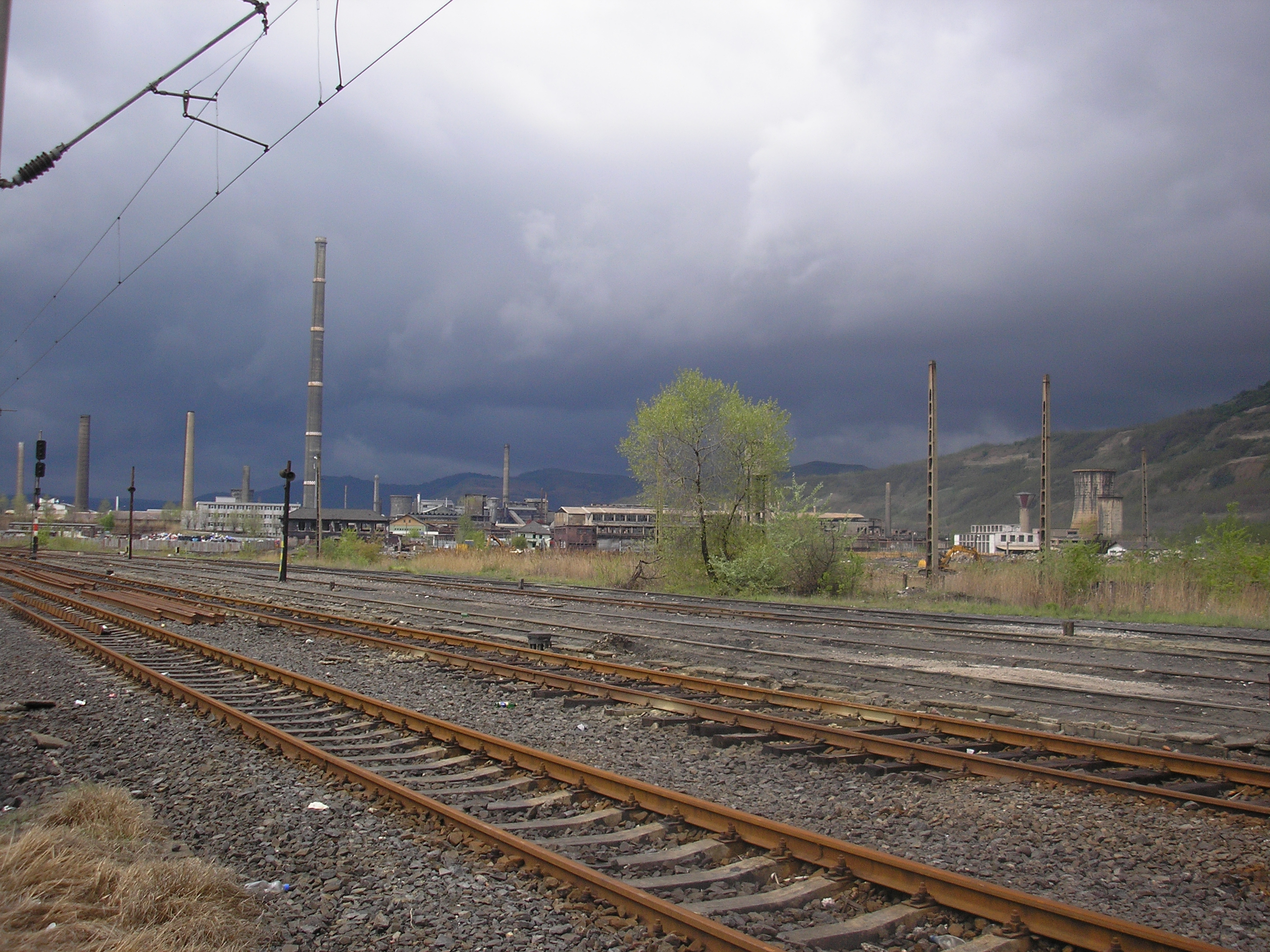
View of the Sometra factory, from local railway tracks

== Demographics ==
Historical population
Year	Pop.	±%
1966	6,156	—
1977	6,194	+0.6%
1992	5,332	−13.9%
2002	5,157	−3.3%
2011	5,201	+0.9%
2021	4,570	−12.1%
Source: Census data

The town's population of 5,201 (as of 2011) is significantly lower compared to its previous level in 1989, the year communism collapsed in Romania. At the 2011 census, 78.8% of inhabitants were Romanians, 11.9% Roma, and 8.7% Hungarians. At the 2021 census, Copșa Mică had a population of 4,570, of which 77.13% were Romanians, 4.81% Hungarians, and 4% Roma.

== Administration and local politics ==
=== Town council ===
The town's current local council has the following political composition, according to the results of the 2020 Romanian local elections:

Party	Seats	Current Council
National Liberal Party (PNL)	8	
Save Romania Union (USR)	3	
Social Democratic Party (PSD)	2	
Democratic Alliance of Hungarians in Romania (UDMR/RMDSZ)	1	
Independent politician (Muntean Vasile-Sorin)	1	

== Natives ==
- Dan Tăpălagă (born 1975), journalist
