= Loamneș =

- Commune
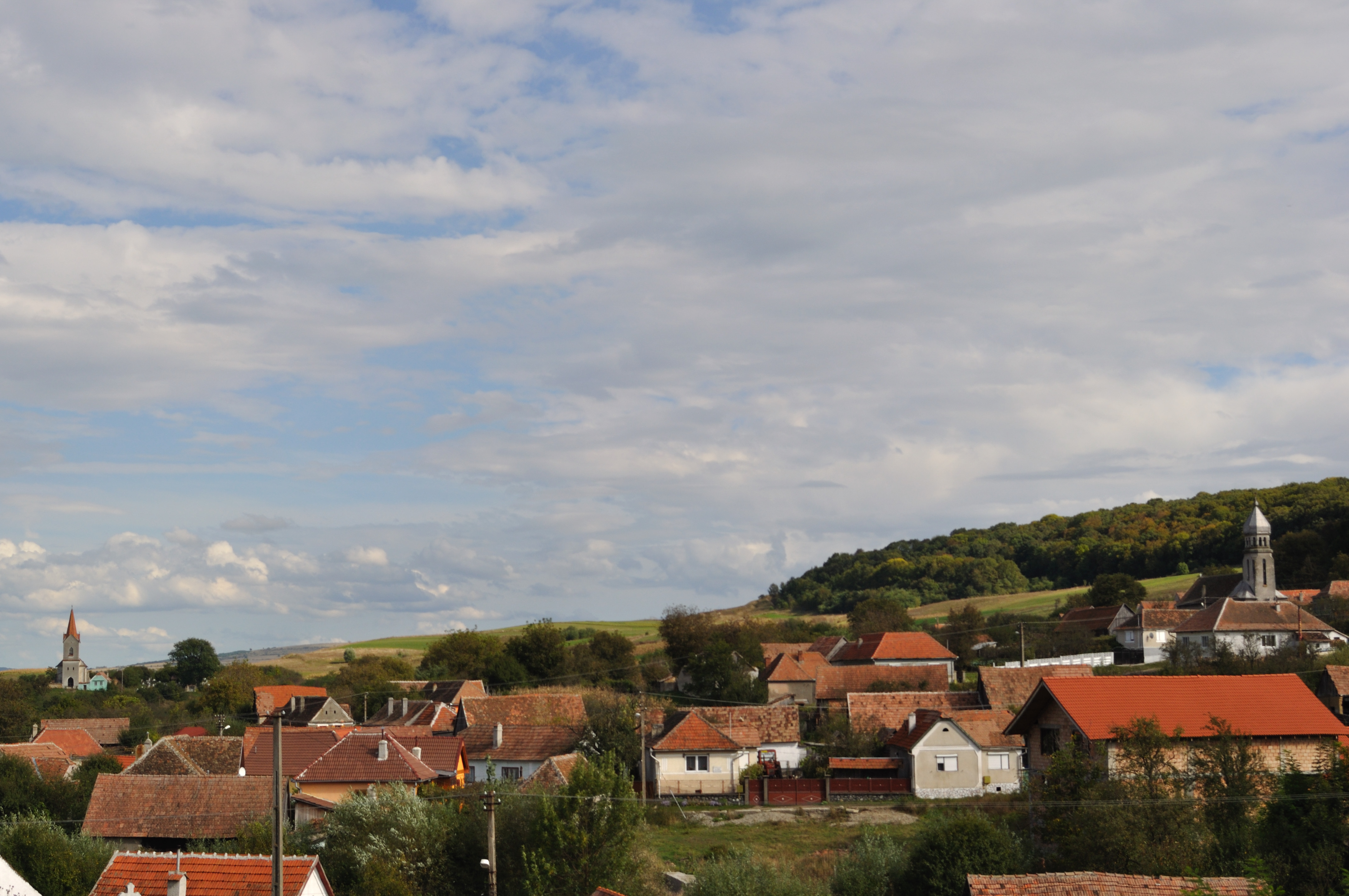
- View of Hașag

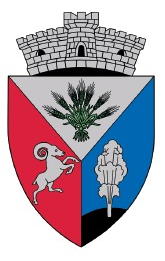
- Coat of arms

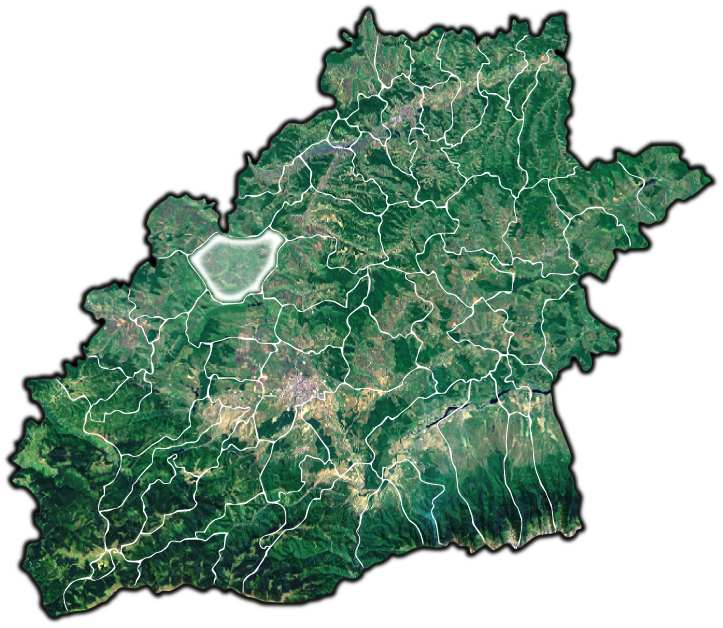
- Location in Sibiu County

- Location in Romania
- Coordinates: 45°56′N 24°6′E
- Country: Romania
- County: Sibiu

Government
  - Mayor (2020–2024): Maria Greavu (PSD)
- Area: 96.6 km^{2} (37.3 sq mi)
- Elevation: 397 m (1,302 ft)
- Population (2021-12-01): 2,562
  - Density: 26.5/km^{2} (68.7/sq mi)
- Time zone: UTC+02:00 (EET)
  - Summer (DST): UTC+03:00 (EEST)
- Postal code: 557120
- Area code: (+40) 02 69
- Vehicle reg.: SB
- Website: loamnessibiu.ro

Loamneș (German: Ladmesch; Hungarian: Ladamos) is a commune located in Sibiu County, Transylvania, Romania. It is composed of six villages: Alămor, Armeni, Hașag, Loamneș, Mândra and Sădinca.

In Romanian	In German	In Hungarian
Alămor	Mildenburg	Alamor
Armeni	Urmenen	Örményszékes
Hașag	Haschagen	Hásság
Loamneș	Ladmesch	Ladamos
Mândra		Széptelep
Sădinca		Szedinkatanya

== Natives ==
- Ioan Barac (1776–1848), translator and poet
- Aron Cotruș (1891–1961), poet and diplomat
