= List of Transylvanian Saxon localities =

This is a list of localities in Transylvania that were, either in majority or in minority, historically inhabited by Transylvanian Saxons, having either churches placed in refuge castles for the local population (German: Kirchenburg = fortress church or Wehrkirche = fortified church), or only village churches (German: Dorfkirchen) built by the Transylvanian Saxons.

German name	Romanian name
Abtsdorf bei Agnetheln	Apoș, Sibiu County
Abtsdorf an der Kokel	Țapu, Sibiu County
Adamesch	Adămuș, Mureș County
Agnetheln (+ Altdorf)	Agnita, Sibiu County
Aitau	Aita Mare, Covasna County
Ajerschteln	Agrișteu, Mureș County
Almaschken	Alma Mică Săsească, Sibiu County
Almen	Alma Vii, Sibiu County
Almesch	Șoimuș, Bistrița-Năsăud County
Altenberg	Baia de Criș, Hunedoara County
Altflagen	Feleag, Mureș County
Alttohan	Tohanul Vechi, Brașov County
Alzen (+ Underten)	Alțâna, Sibiu County
Appesdorf	Cluj-Mănăștur, Cluj County
Arbegen	Agârbiciu, Sibiu County
Arendorf	Araci, Covasna County
Arkeden bei Bistriz	Archiud, Bistrița-Năsăud County
Arkeden bei Schäßburg (+ Wordt)	Archita, Mureș County
Auen	Cușma, Bistrița-Năsăud County
Auendorf	Gura Râului, Sibiu County
Baaßen	Bazna, Sibiu County
Bachnen	Bahnea, Mureș County
Badlinen	Beclean, Bistrița-Năsăud County
Bägendorf	Benești, Sibiu County
Baierdorf	Crainimăt, Bistrița-Năsăud County
Ballendorf	Balomiru de Câmp, Alba County
Bärendorf	Beriu, Hunedoara County
Bartholomä	Bartolomeu, Brașov County
Batiz	Batiz, Hunedoara County
Baumgarten/Bistriz	Bungard, Bistrița-Năsăud County
Baumgarten/Hermannstadt	Bungard, Sibiu County
Bekokten	Bărcuț, Brașov County
Bell	Buia, Sibiu County
Belleschdorf	Idiciu, Mureș County
Benden	Biia, Alba County
Benzenz	Binținți (nowadays Aurel Vlaicu), Hunedoara County
Bernhardsdorf	Bernadea, Mureș County
Besotten	Buza, Cluj County
Bethlen/Bistriz	Beclean, Bistrița-Năsăud
Bidda	Bidiu, Bistrița-Năsăud
Bierldorf	Bârla, Bistrița-Năsăud
Billak	Domnești, Bistrița-Năsăud
Birk	Petelea, Mureș County
Birnbaum	Ghirbom, Alba County
Birthälm (+ Fettendorf)	Biertan, Sibiu County
Bistritz (+ Niederwallendorf)	Bistrița, Bistrița-Năsăud County
Bladenmarkt	Bălăușeri
Blasendorf	Blaj
Blumendorf	Belin
Blutroth (+ Paulsdorf)	Berghin
Bodeln	Budila
Bodendorf	Bunești
Bodesdorf	Buduș, Bistrița-Năsăud County
Bogeschdorf	Băgaciu, Mureș County
Bonnesdorf	Boian
Borbant	Bărăbanț, Alba County
Botsch	Batoș, Mureș County
Botschard	Bucerdea Grânoasă, Alba County
Braller	Bruiu
Breit	Bretea
Brenndorf	Bod, Brașov County
Broos	Orăștie, Hunedoara County
Bruck	Bonțida, Cluj County
Buchholz (+ Schalgo)	Boholț , Brașov County
Budenbach	Sibiel
Bulkesch	Bălcaciu
Burg Zebernek	Cetatea de la Vurpăr
Burgberg bei Hermannstadt	Vurpăr, Sibiu County
Burgberg bei Mühlbach	Vurpăr, Alba County
Bürgesch	Bârghiș, Sibiu County
Burghalle	Orheiul Bistriței, Bistrița-Năsăud County
Burglos	Dej, Cluj County
Bußd bei Mediasch	Buzd, Sibiu County
Bußd bei Mühlbach	Boz, Alba County
Garndorf	Ardan, Bistrița-Năsăud County
Dahl	Dăișoara, Brașov County
Dallen bei Mühlbach	Deal, Alba County
Dallendorf	Daia Română, Alba County
Dengel	Daia (previously Daia Săsească), Apold, Mureș County
Denndorf	Daia, Bahnea, Mureș County
Dersch	Dârjiu, Harghita County
Deutschbach	Valea Sasului, Alba County
Deutschbudak	Budacu de Jos, Bistrița-Năsăud County
Deutschendorf	Mintiu Gherlii
Deutschkreuz	Criț
Deutschpien	Pianul de Jos, Alba County
Deutschtekes	Ticușul Vechi, Brașov County
Deutschweißkirch	Viscri, Brașov County
Deutschzepling	Dedrad, Mureș County
Diemrich	Deva, Hunedoara County
Dienesdorf	Șieu-Odorhei, Bistrița-Năsăud County
Dobring	Dobârca
Donnersmarkt	Mănărade
Dopich	Dopca
Draas	Drăușeni
Dreikirchen	Teiuș, Alba County
Dunesdorf	Daneș, Mureș County
Durles	Dârlos, Sibiu County
Dürrbach	Dipșa
Ehrgang	Ernea
Eibesdorf	Ighișu Nou
Eisch	Fântânele
Eisdorf	Ionești
Eisenburg	Rimetea
Elisabethstadt	Dumbrăveni
Elsterdorf	Sereca
Emerichsdorf	Sântimbru
Engenthal	Mighindoala
Ensch	Enciu
Etschdorf	Iernuțeni
Eulenbach	Ilimbav
Falk	Feleac
Feigendorf	Micăsasa
Feisket	Sălcuța
Felldorf	Filitelnic
Felmern	Felmer
Felsendorf	Florești
Fenesch	Florești
Fogarasch	Făgăraș
Frauendorf	Frâua, nowadays Axente Sever
Frauenkirch	Sântămărie
Freck	Avrig
Freißendorf	Lunca Bistriței
Fürstenberg	Hăghic
Füssen	Feisa
Gallusdorf	Galeș
Galt	Ungra
Gassen	Vălenii de Mureș
Geist	Apața
Gela	Gilău
Gergeschdorf	Ungurei
Gergesdorf	Căpâlna de Jos
Gierelsau	Bradu
Gieshübel	Gusu
Gindusdorf	Băița
Gladen	Gledin
Glatz bei Fogarasch	Gălaț (nowadays Galații Făgărașului)
Gogeschburg	Gogan-Varola
Gogeschdorf	Giacăș
Grabendorf	Vale
Großalisch	Seleuș
Großau	Cristian, Sibiu County
Großbun	Boiu
Großeidau	Viile Tecii
Großendorf/Bistriz	Mărișelu
Großendorf/Hermannstadt (+ Woltescht)	Săliște (+ Voltești)
Großkend	Chendu Mare
Großkopisch	Copșa Mare
Großlasseln	Laslea
Großlogdes	Ludoș
Großpold	Apoldu de Sus
Großprobstdorf	Probștea Mare (nowadays Târnava)
Großrapoit	Rapoltu Mare
Großschenk	Cincu
Großschergied	Cergăul Mare
Großscheuern	Șura Mare
Großschlatten	Abrud
Großschogen	Șieu
Grubendorf	Ceuaș
Gugendorf	Gogan
Gunzendorf	Poplaca
Gürteln	Gherdeal
Hahnbach	Hamba
Halmagen	Hălmeag
Halwelagen	Hoghilag
Hamlesch (+ Marienkirch)	Amnaș
Hammersdorf	Gușterița
Harnrüden	Homorod
Härwesdorf	Cornățel
Haschagen	Hașag
Heidendorf	Viișoara
Heldsdorf (+ Heldenburg)	Hălchiu
Heltau (+ Reutel)	Cisnădie
Henndorf	Brădeni
Henningsdorf	Henig
Heresdorf	Galații Bistriței
Hermannstadt	Sibiu
Hetzeldorf	Ațel
Hochfeld	Fofeldea
Hohndorf	Viișoara
Holzmengen	Hosman
Honigberg	Hărman
Hopfenseifen	Hopșu
Hühnerbach	Glâmboaca
Hundertbücheln (+ Schmielen)	Movile
Irmesch	Ormeniș
Jaad (+ Ependorf)	Livezile
Jakobsdorf/Agnetheln	Iacobeni
Jakobsdorf/Bistriz	Sâniacob
Johannisberg	Nucet
Johannisdorf/Bistriz	Sântioana
Johannisdorf/Kleinkopisch	Sântioana
Käbesch	Coveș
Kailesdorf	Arcalia
Kakowa	Dumbrava, Alba County
Kaltbrunnen	Calbor
Kaltenbrunnen/Schäßburg	Uilac
Kaltwasser	Calvasăr
Kappelendorf	Căpâlna, Commune of Săsciori, Alba County
Käppelsbach	Cărpiniș
Karlsburg/Weißenburg	Alba Iulia
Kastendorf	Castău
Kastenholz	Cașolț
Katzendorf	Cața
Keisd (+ Alzen)	Saschiz
Kellen	Colun
Kelling	Câlnic, Alba
Kerschdorf	Presaca
Kertzing	Gornești
Kerz	Cârța
Kesseln	Chesler
Kiewern	Cobor
Kindeln	Chintelnic
Kirchberg	Chirpăr
Kirtsch	Curciu
Klausenburg	Cluj
Kleinalisch	Seleuș
Kleinbistritz	Dorolea
Kleinblasendorf	Blăjel
Kleindörfel	Micești
Kleinenyed	Sângătin
Kleinfarken	Delenii
Kleinkopisch	Copșa Mică
Kleinlasseln	Laslăul Mic
Kleinmühlbach	Sebeșel
Kleinphlepsdorf	Filipișul Mic
Kleinpold	Apoldul de Jos
Kleinprobstdorf	Probștea Mică (nowadays Târnăvioara)
Kleinrumes	Romoșel
Kleinschelken	Șeica Mică
Kleinschenk	Cincșor
Kleinschergied	Cergăul Mic
Kleinscheuern	Șura Mică
Kleinschlatten	Zlatna
Kleinschogen	Sieuț
Kleintalmesch	Tălmăcel
Klosdorf/Kleinkopisch	Sânmiclăuș, Alba County
Klosdorf/Reps	Cloașterf
Kokelburg	Cetatea de Baltă
Kokt	Cut, Alba County
Köllendorf	Caila
Komeloden	Comlod, Commune of Milaș, Bistrița-Năsăud County
Königsberg	Crihalma
Königsdorf	Paloș, Brașov County
Konradsdorf	Poenița
Kormosbach	Racoșul de Sus
Krakau (+ Burg Gemsenstein)	Cricău
Krapundorf	Ighiu
Krebsbach bei Hermannstadt	Cacova (nowadays Fântânele), Sibiu County
Krebsbach bei Kronstadt	Crizbav, Brașov County
Kreisch (+ Nisseidorf + Schlaßdorf)	Criș
Kreuzburg	Teliu
Kronstadt	Brașov
Krotschendorf	Crăciunelu de Sus
Kudschir (+ Wolkesdorf)	Cugir
Kyrieleis	Chiraleș
Ladmesch	Loamneș
Langendorf	Lancrăm
Langenthal	Valea Lungă
Lauterburg	Cetatea Lotrului
Leblang	Lovnic
Lechnitz	Lechința
Lehr	Luieriu
Leresdorf	Șieu Sfântu, Bistrița-Năsăud County
Leschkirch	Nocrich
Lona/Klausenburg	Luna de Sus
Ludwigsdorf	Logig
Magarei	Pelișor
Makendorf	Mocod
Maldorf	Domald
Malmkrog	Mălâncrav
Maniersch	Măgheruș
Mardisch	Moardăș
Marienburg/Kronstadt	Feldioara
Marienburg/Schäßburg	Hetiur
Marktscheiken (+Rependorf)	Șeica Mare
Markusdorf	Mintia
Marpod	Marpod
Martinsberg	Șomartin
Martinsdorf	Metiș
Mathesdorf	Matei
Mausdorf	Săcalu de Pădure
Mediasch (+Furkeschdorf)	Mediaș
Meeburg	Beia
Mergeln	Merghindeal
Meschen (+Weißdorf)	Moșna
Meschendorf	Meșendorf
Mettersdorf (+ Bachnen + Fattendorf + Tekes + Ziegendorf)	Dumitra
Michelsberg	Cisnădioara
Michelsdorf/Kleinkopisch	Veseuș
Michelsdorf/Mediasch	Boaita
Mikesdorf	Părău
Mildenburg	Alămor
Minarken	Monariu
Mindorf	Monor
Mitteldorf	Chiuza
Moichen	Mohu
Mönchsdorf	Herina
Moritzdorf	Moruț
Mortesdorf	Motiș
Mühlbach (+ Gießhübel)	Sebeș
Mukendorf	Grânari
Muttersdorf	Dumitra
Nadesch	Nadeș
Neithausen (+ Michelsdorf)	Netuș
Neppendorf	Turnișor
Netz	Nețeni
Neudorf/Ad.	Rădești
Neudorf/Hermannstadt	Noul
Neudorf/Kronstadt (+ Hopfenseifen)	Satu Nou
Neudorf/Schäßburg	Noul Săsesc
Neudorf/Wb.	Ohaba
Neuflagen	Mureni
Neumarkt	Târgu-Mureș
Neuschloß	Gherla
Neustadt/Agnetheln	Noiștat
Neustadt/Kronstadt	Cristian
Niedereidisch	Ideciu de Jos
Niederneudorf	Corvinești
Nieresch	Nireș
Nimesch	Nemșa
Nindorf	Nimigea de Jos
Nußbach	Măieruș
Nussendorf	Năsăud
Oberblasendorf	Blăjenii de Sus
Oberbrodsdorf	Vinerea
Obereidisch	Ideciu de Sus
Oberkreuz	Cristur-Șieu
Oberneudorf	Cetate
Oberröbendorf	Vătava
Oberschebesch	Sebiș
Ochsendorf (+ Lauterburg)	Boița
Odendorf	Apalina
Offenburg	Baia de Arieș
Okne	Ocnița
Panagen	Pănade
Paßbusch	Posmuș
Perkaß	Pricaz
Pernseifen	Băița
Peschendorf	Stejăreni
Petersberg	Sânpetru
Petersdorf/Bistriz	Petriș
Petersdorf/Mediasch	Petiș
Petersdorf/Mühlbach	Petrești
Petsch	Petecu
Pintak/Bistriz	Slătinița
Pintak/Td.	Pinticu
Pojana	Poiana Sibiului
Pränzdorf	Suseni
Pretai	Bratei
Probstdorf/Agnetheln	Stejărișu
Prüden	Prod
Puschendorf	Păucea
Radeln	Roadeș
Ragelsdorf	Ragla
Rakowitza	Racovița
Ratsch	Reciu
Rauthal	Roandola
Reckentek	Reteag
Reichau	Răhău
Reichesdorf	Richiș
Reissen	Rusu Bârgăului
Rekitta	Răchita
Rependorf	Râpa
Reps	Rupea
Retersdorf	Retiș
Reußdorf	Cund
Reußdörfchen	Ruscior
Reußen/Bistriz	Sărățel
Reußen/Mediasch	Ruși
Reußmarkt (+Mondorf, + Weißkirch, + Sankt-Georgen)	Miercurea Sibiului
Ringelkirch	Valea Ringhili
Rod	Rod
Rode	Zagăr
Rodna	Rodna
Rohrbach	Rodbav
Rosch	Răvășel
Roseln	Ruja
Rosenau	Râșnov
Roter Turm	Turnul Roșu
Rothbach	Rotbav
Rothberg/Hermannstadt	Roșia
Rothkirch/Bistriz	Strugureni
Rothkirch/Mühlbach	Roșia de Secaș
Ruckersdorf	Rucăr
Rumänisch Baierdorf	Mintiu
Rumänisch Budak	Budacul de Sus
Rumänisch Eibesdorf	Ighișu Vechi
Rumänisch Lasseln	Laslăul Mare
Rumänisch Neudorf	Noul Român
Rumänisch Pien	Pianul de Sus
Rumänisch Sankt Georgen	Sângeorz-Băi
Rumänisch Tekes	Ticușul Nou
Rumes	Romos
Sachsenbach	Spătac
Sachsenhausen	Săsăuș
Sächsisch Erkes	Archiș
Sächsisch Reen	Reghin
Salz	Sărata
Salzburg	Ocna Sibiului
Salzdorf	Ocna Dejului
Salzgrub	Cojocna
Sankt Georgen	Sângeorzu Nou
Sankt Martin	Târnăveni
Schaal	Șoala
Schaas	Șaeș
Schaldorf	Mihăileni
Schalko	Șalcău
Schalmen	Șoimuș
Scharberg	Dumbrăvioara
Schard/Schäßburg	Șoard
Schard/Wb. (+St. Martin)	Șard
Scharosch/Fogarasch	Șoarș
Scharosch/Mediasch	Șaroș pe Târnave
Scharpendorf	Glodeni
Schäßburg	Sighișoara
Schelken/Bz	Jeica
Schellenberg	Șelimbăr
Scherling	Măgurele
Schirkanyen	Șercaia
Schlaft	Zlagna
Schmiegen	Șmig
Schnakendorf	Dumbrăvița
Schölten	Cenade
Schönau	Șona
Schönberg	Dealul Frumos
Schönbirk	Sigmir
Schönen	Șona
Schorsten	Șoroștin
Schwarzwasser	Săcel
Schweinsdorf	Turnu Roșu
Schweischer	Fișer
Sebeschel	Sibișel
Seck	Sic
Seiburg	Jibert
Seiden	Jidvei
Seimesdorf	Simionești
Seligstadt	Seliștat
Senndorf	Jelna
Siebendörfer	Săcele
Silwasch	Silivaș
Simkragen	Șintereag
Sinna	Jina
Sommer	Jimbor
Sommerburg	Jimbor
Spring	Șpring
St. Martin	Diciosânmartin, or Târnava-Sân-Martin, now Târnăveni, a city in Mureș County
Städterdorf	Rășinari
Stein/Mediasch	Ștenea
Stein bei Reps	Ștena, officially Dacia
Stolzenburg	Slimnic
Strassburg am Mieresch	Aiud
Streitfort	Mercheașa
Strugar	Strungari
Szakadat	Săcădate
Szászcsor (+ Szilvás)	Săscior
Talmesch	Tălmaciu
Tarteln	Toarcla
Tartlau	Prejmer
Taterloch	Tătârlaua
Tatsch	Tonciu
Tekendorf	Teaca
Tetschein	Aciliu
Teufelsdorf	Vânători
Thalheim	Daia, a village of the Roșia commune
Thorenburg	Turda
Thorstadt (+ Ringelkirch)	Doștat
Tilischka	Tilișca
Tobsdorf	Dupuș
Tordesch	Turdaș
Törnen	Păuca
Törzburg	Bran
Trappold	Apold
Traßten	Lunca
Treppen	Tărpiu
Troschen	Drașov
Tschapertsch	Topârcea
Tschippendorf	Cepari
Ungarisch Reen	Reghin Sat
Ungersdorf	Șieu-Măgheruș
Unterblasendorf	Blăjenii de Jos
Unterbrodsdorf	Șibot
Untergesäß	Ghijasa de Jos
Unterrübendorf	Râpa de Jos
Untersebesch/Bistriz	Ruștior
Untersebesch/Hermannstadt	Sebeșul de Jos
Untervenitze	Veneția de Jos
Unterwardein	Oarda de Jos
Urmenen	Armeni
Urwegen	Cârbova
Vajasd	Oiejdea
Waldhütten	Valchid
Wallendorf	Unirea
Waltersdorf	Dumitrița
Warmwasser	Hoghiz
Wassid	Veseud
Weidenbach	Ghimbav
Weiersdorf	Tău
Weilau (+ Radesch)	Uila
Weingartskirchen	Vingard
Weißenburg	Alba Iulia
Weißhorn	Săsarm
Weißkirch/Bistriz	Albeștii Bistriței
Weißkirch/Schäßburg	Albești
Wepeschdorf	Pipea
Werd	Vărd
Wermesch	Vermeș
Westen	Veștem
Wetsch	Brâncovenești
Wetscherd (+Hemsdorf)	Vecerd
Windau	Ghinda
Winsberg	Orlat
Winz (+ Sächsisch Pad, + Burg Zebernek)	Vințu de Jos
Wladein	Vlădeni
Woiwoden	Vaidei
Woldorf	Văleni
Wolkendorf/Kronstadt	Vulcan, Brașov County
Wolkendorf/Schäßburg	Sighișoara
Wölz	Velț
Woßling	Țeline
Wurmloch	Valea Viilor
Zagendorf	Țigău
Zeiden (+Schwarzburg)	Codlea
Zekeschdorf	Cunța
Zendersch	Senereuș
Zernest	Zărnești
Zied	Veseud
Ziegenstein	Piatra Craivii
Ziegenthal	Țichindeal
Zoltendorf	Mihai Viteazu
Zood	Sadu
Zuckmantel	Țigmandru, Mureș County

== See also ==
- German exonyms (Transylvania)
