= Archita =

Archita may refer to:

- Archita Sahu, Indian actress
- Archita Ricci, Italian painter
- Archytas, an Ancient Greek mathematician, music theorist, statesman, and strategist
- Archita, Mureș, a village in Vânători Commune, Mureș County, Romania
- Archita (river), a river in Mureș County, Romania
