= Sântioana =

Sântioana may refer to several places in Romania:

- Sântioana, a village in Mărișelu Commune, Bistrița-Năsăud County
- Sântioana, a village in Țaga Commune, Cluj County
- Sântioana, a village in Viișoara Commune, Mureș County
- Sântioana de Mureș, a village in Pănet Commune, Mureș County
- Sântioana (river), a tributary of the Târnava Mică in Mureș County
