= Repa =

Repa may refer to:

== People ==
- Matúš Repa (born 2002), Slovak football player
- Vojtěch Řepa (born 2000), Czech cyclist
- Waltraut Peck-Repa (1940–1998), Austrian foil fencer

== Other ==
- Repa (genus), a genus of moths
- Râpa (Mureș), a tributary of the river Mureș, Romania
