= Rapa =

Rapa may refer to:

== People ==
- Oltion Rapa (born 1989), Albanian footballer

== Places ==
- Rapa Nui, the native name of Easter Island, a special territory of Chile
- Rapa Iti, one of the Bass Islands in French Polynesia
- Rapa, Poland, a village in Warmian-Masurian Voivodeship

== Rivers ==
- Rapa River, a tributary of the Lesser Lule River in Sweden
- Râpa (Mureș), a tributary of the River Mureș in Transylvania, Romania
- Râpa (Vișa), a tributary of the Vișa in Sibiu County, Romania

== Other uses ==
- Rapa language, the language of Rapa Iti, in the Austral Islands of French Polynesia
- Rapa (gastropod), a genus of sea snails
- Rapa, a name for the plant rapeseed (Brassica napus)
- Rapa (TV series), a Spanish television series

== See also ==
- Râpa (disambiguation)
