= Sándor Gellér =

Hungarian footballer (1925–1996)

Personal information
- Date of birth: 12 July 1925
- Place of birth: Veseuș, Kingdom of Romania
- Date of death: 13 March 1996 (aged 70)
- Place of death: Budapest, Hungary
- Position: Goalkeeper

Senior career*
Years	Team	Apps	(Gls)
1945–1947	Püspökladányi SC		
1947–1962	MTK Budapest	260	(0)

International career
1950–1956	Hungary	8	(0)
- * Club domestic league appearances and goals

Sándor Gellér (12 July 1925 – 13 March 1996) was a Hungarian Olympic footballer who played as a goalkeeper. He was Jewish, and was born in Veseuș, Romania.

He made no appearances when he was in the Hungary national team at the 1952 Summer Olympics in Helsinki, Finland. He played with Budapesti Vörös Lobogó between 1954 and 1955, and in the 1954 FIFA World Cup for Hungary.

== See also ==
- List of select Jewish football (association; soccer) players
