= Prod =

Prod or PROD may refer to:

- Cattle prod, a device used to goad livestock into moving
- Public Request to Order Disposal, part of the Local Government, Planning and Land Act 1980
- Prod, a village in Hoghilag Commune, Sibiu County, Romania
- Product integral, often shown using the symbol $\prod$
- "Prod", a song by Mudvayne from L.D. 50
- Prod, the bow or spring part of a crossbow
- PROD, a method of deletion of articles on Wikipedia
