= Scroafa =

- Location within Romania

Location
- Country: Romania
- Counties: Brașov, Mureș
- Villages: Roadeș, Bunești, Criț, Saschiz

Physical characteristics
- Mouth: Târnava Mare
  - location: Mureni
  - coordinates: 46.2463°N 24.9547°E
- Length: 39 km (24 mi)
- Basin size: 334 km^{2} (129 sq mi)

Basin features
- Progression: Târnava Mare→ Târnava→ Mureș→ Tisza→ Danube→ Black Sea
- Tributaries
  - left: Pârâul Tare, Valea Vaidnei, Cimaș, Flosa
  - right: Archita

The Scroafa (Hungarian: Szkrófa) is a left tributary of the river Târnava Mare in Romania. It discharges into the Târnava Mare near Mureni. Its length is 39 km (24 mi) and its basin size is 334 km^{2} (129 sq mi).
