= Sântioana (river) =

- Location within Romania

Location
- Country: Romania
- Counties: Mureș County
- Villages: Sântioana, Ormeniș, Laslău Mic, Laslău Mare

Physical characteristics
- Mouth: Târnava Mică
  - location: Laslău Mare
  - coordinates: 46.3911°N 24.5402°E
- Length: 16 km (9.9 mi)
- Basin size: 45 km^{2} (17 sq mi)

Basin features
- Progression: Târnava Mică→ Târnava→ Mureș→ Tisza→ Danube→ Black Sea

The Sântioana is a left tributary of the river Târnava Mică in Romania. It discharges into the Târnava Mică in Laslău Mare. Its length is 16 km (9.9 mi) and its basin size is 45 km^{2} (17 sq mi).
