= Veta Biriș =

Romanian folk music singer

- Born: 11 August 1949 (age 75); Veseuș, Alba County, Romania
- Genres: Folk and patriotic music
- Occupation: Singer
- Instrument: Vocals

Veta Biriș (born 11 August 1949) is a Romanian folk music singer. She was born in Veseuș, a village in Jidvei commune, Alba County, in a large family of seven siblings. Biriș moved in 1966 to nearby Căpâlna de Jos and debuted as a singer the following year in a music competition as a representative of the Mureș-Magyar Autonomous Region.

Her repertoire mainly consists of a wide variety of folk music and she has released several albums. Among these are Așa-i românul ("This is how the Romanian is", 1995), La aniversare ("Anniversary", 1999), Oi cânta cu drag în lume ("I'll sing with love to the world", 2001), Vechi cântece românești ("Old Romanian songs", 2007) and E vremea colindelor ("It's the time of carols", 2008, together with Ionuț Fulea). On 7 February 2004, she was awarded the Order of Cultural Merit by the Romanian President Ion Iliescu.
