= Râpa =

Râpa may refer to:

== Rivers ==
- Râpa (Mureș), in Mureș County, Romania
- Râpa (Vișa), in Sibiu County, Romania

== Villages ==
- Râpa, a village in Tinca Commune, Bihor County, Romania
- Râpa, a village in the town of Motru, Gorj County, Romania
- Râpa de Jos, a village in Vătava Commune, Mureș County, Romania
