= Archita (river) =

River in Romania

- Location within Romania

Location
- Country: Romania
- Counties: Mureș County
- Villages: Archita

Physical characteristics
- Mouth: Scroafa
  - location: Mureni
  - coordinates: 46.2282°N 24.9721°E
- Length: 21 km (13 mi)
- Basin size: 132 km^{2} (51 sq mi)

Basin features
- Progression: Scroafa→ Târnava Mare→ Târnava→ Mureș→ Tisza→ Danube→ Black Sea
- Tributaries
  - right: Pârâul Mare, Vereschit, Feleag

The Archita (Hungarian: Erked-patak) is a right tributary of the river Scroafa in Romania. It discharges into the Scroafa near Mureni. Its length is 21 km (13 mi) and its basin size is 132 km^{2} (51 sq mi).
