= Balta (Târnava Mică) =

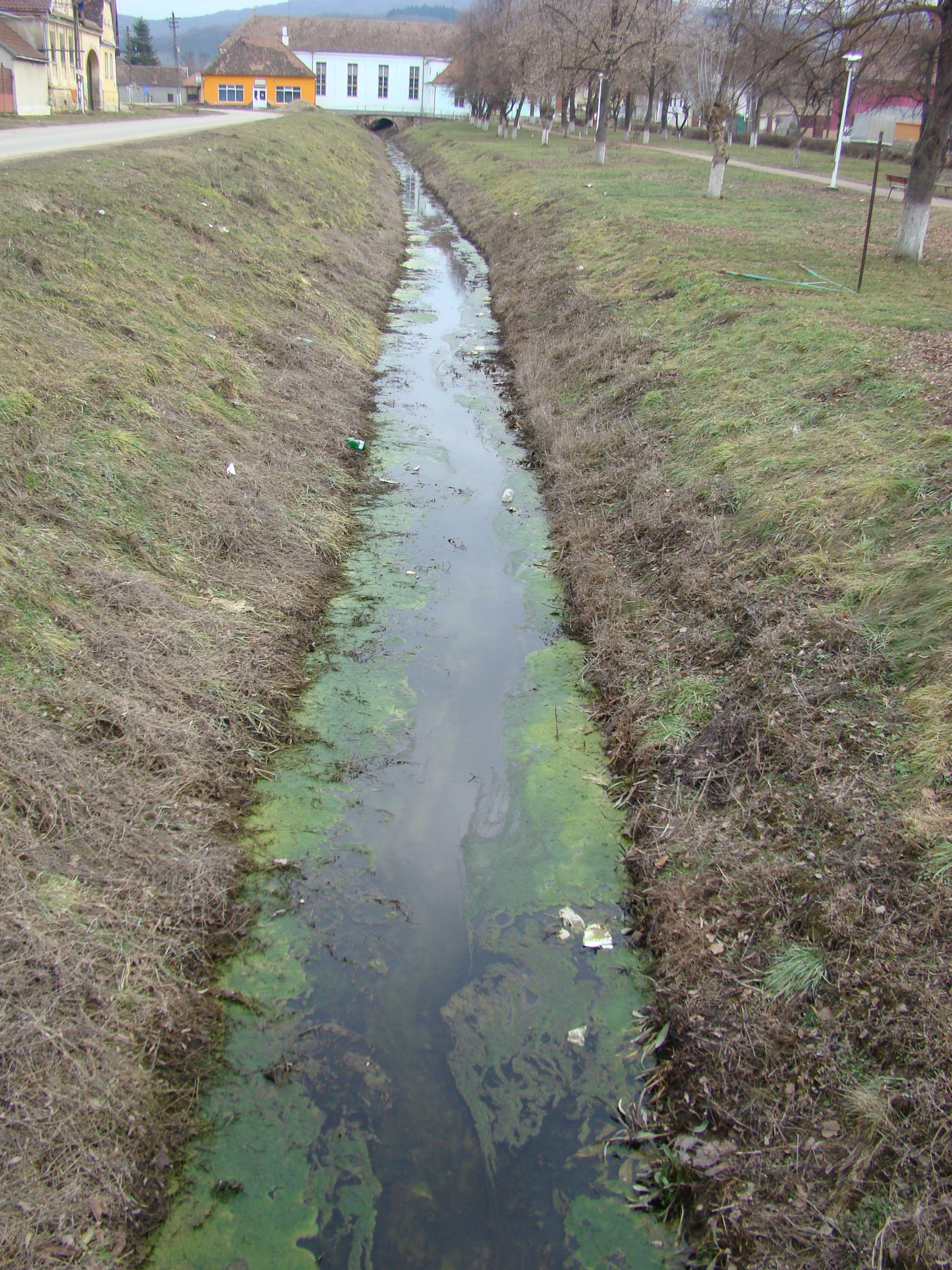

- Location within Romania

Location
- Country: Romania
- Counties: Sibiu, Alba
- Villages: Bazna, Boian, Cetatea de Baltă

Physical characteristics
- Mouth: Târnava Mică
  - location: Sântămărie
  - coordinates: 46.2391°N 24.1478°E
- Length: 20 km (12 mi)
- Basin size: 141 km^{2} (54 sq mi)

Basin features
- Progression: Târnava Mică→ Târnava→ Mureș→ Tisza→ Danube→ Black Sea
- Tributaries
  - left: Rora, Tătârlaua

The Balta is a left tributary of the river Târnava Mică in Romania. It discharges into the Târnava Mică in Sântămărie, near Cetatea de Baltă. Its length is 20 km (12 mi) and its basin size is 141 km^{2} (54 sq mi).
