= Valchid =

- Location within Romania

Location
- Country: Romania
- Counties: Sibiu County
- Villages: Copșa Mare, Valchid

Physical characteristics
- Mouth: Târnava Mare
  - location: near Dumbrăveni
  - coordinates: 46.2202°N 24.5956°E
- Length: 19 km (12 mi)
- Basin size: 50 km^{2} (19 sq mi)

Basin features
- Progression: Târnava Mare→ Târnava→ Mureș→ Tisza→ Danube→ Black Sea
- Tributaries
  - left: Valea Caselor

The Valchid is a left tributary of the river Târnava Mare in Romania. It flows into the Târnava Mare near Dumbrăveni. Its length is 19 km (12 mi) and its basin size is 50 km^{2} (19 sq mi).
