= Cetatea de Baltă =

- Commune
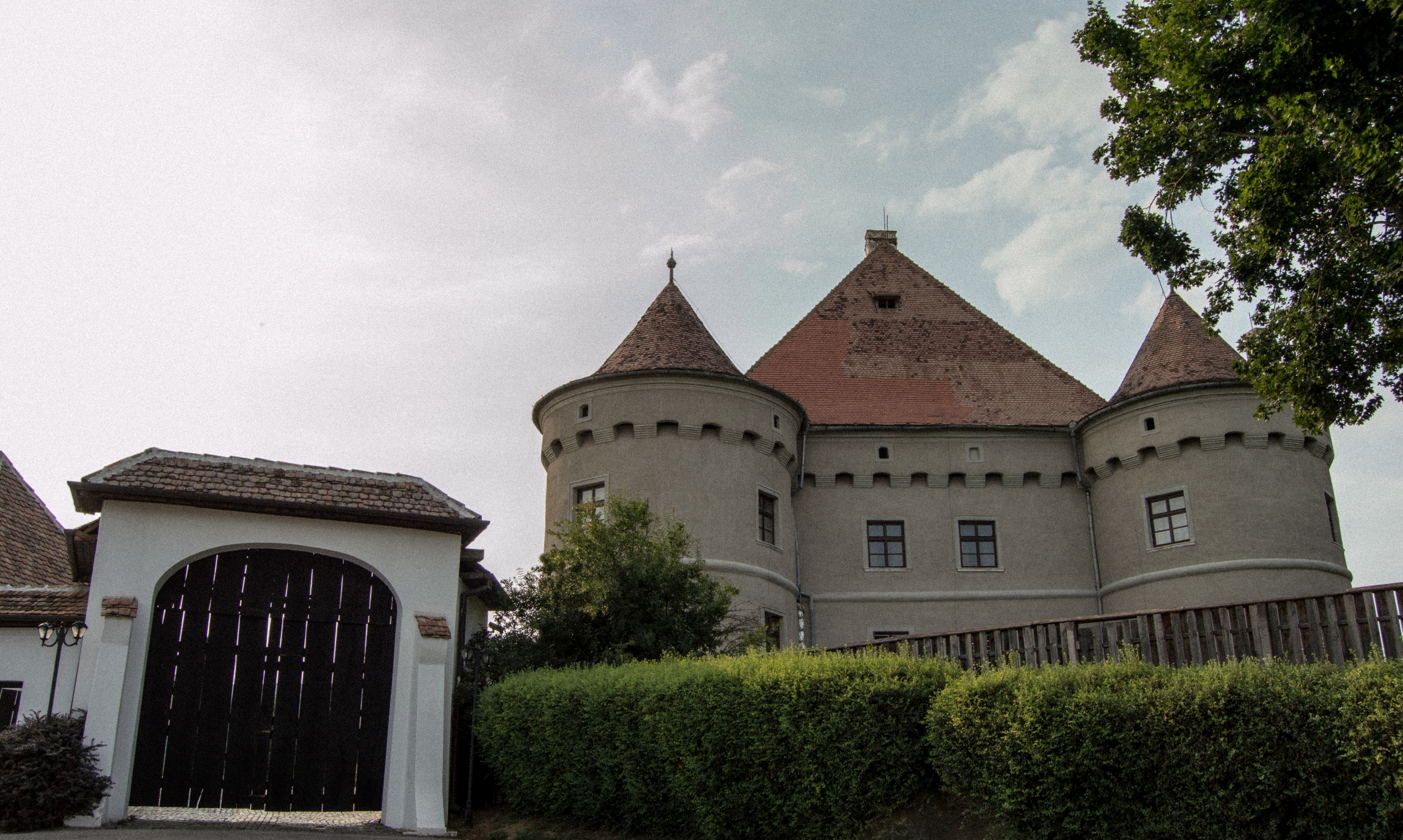
- Bethlen-Haller Castle

- Seal

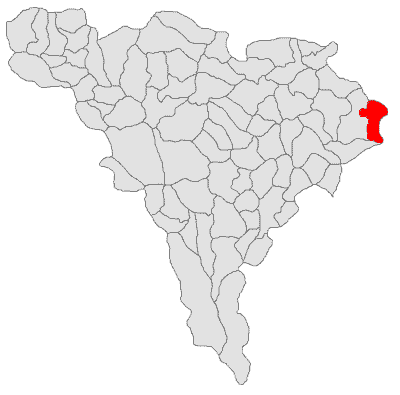
- Location in Alba County

- Location in Romania
- Coordinates: 46°15′N 24°10′E
- Country: Romania
- County: Alba

Government
  - Mayor (2020–2024): Constantin Comandaru (PNL)
- Area: 64.91 km^{2} (25.06 sq mi)
- Elevation: 267 m (876 ft)
- Population (2021-12-01): 2,792
  - Density: 43.01/km^{2} (111.4/sq mi)
- Time zone: UTC+02:00 (EET)
  - Summer (DST): UTC+03:00 (EEST)
- Postal code: 517235
- Vehicle reg.: AB
- Website: cetateadebalta.ro

Cetatea de Baltă (Hungarian: Küküllővár; German: Kokelburg) is a commune in Alba County, Transylvania, Romania. The commune is composed of four villages: Cetatea de Baltă, Crăciunelu de Sus (Christendorf; Felsőkarácsonyfalva), Sântămărie (Frauenkirch; Boldogfalva), and Tătârlaua (Taterloch; Felsőtatárlaka).

== Geography ==
The commune is located in the northeastern corner of the county, on the border with Sibiu and Mureș counties. It is traversed by county road DJ 117, which connects it to Târnăveni, 15 km (9.3 mi) to the northeast, and to Blaj, 21 km (13 mi) to the southeast; the county seat, Alba Iulia, is some 35 km (22 mi) past Blaj.

To the east it borders with Adămuș commune from Mureș County and with Bazna commune from Sibiu County, to the south and west with Valea Lungă commune, and to the west and north with Jidvei commune.

Cetatea de Baltă lies on the left bank of the river Târnava Mică. The river Balta which discharges into the Târnava Mică in the village of Sântămărie. The river Tătârlaua is a left tributary of the river Balta; it discharges into the Balta in the village of Tătârlaua.

== Population ==
Historical population
Year	Pop.	±%
1850	3,102	—
1900	3,684	+18.8%
1941	4,450	+20.8%
2002	3,217	−27.7%
2011	2,930	−8.9%
2021	2,792	−4.7%
Source: INS, Census data

At the 2021 census, Cetatea de Baltă had a population of 2,792, of whom 41.26% were Romanians, 38.04% Roma, and 14.46% Hungarians. At the 2011 census, the commune had 2,930 inhabitants, of whom 48.4% were Romanians, 33.3% Roma, 17.8% Hungarians, and 0.5% Germans. At the 2002 census, the villages of Cetatea de Baltă and Crăciunelu de Sus had an ethnic majority of Romanians, Săntămărie an ethnic majority of Hungarians, and Tătârlaua an ethnic majority of Roma.

== Touristic sights ==
- The Bethlen Castle, built in the 16th century in the French Renaissance style and restored in the 17th-18th centuries in the Baroque style.
- A fortress (1st century BC-1st century AD), today only ruins.
- The Reformed Church, a 13th-century building.

== Economy ==
The most important economic resource is agriculture. Cetatea de Baltă is part of the Târnave Vineyard, making viticulture an essential component of the local economy. The Cetatea de Baltă gas field is located on the territory of the commune.
