= Domald =

- Location within Romania

Location
- Country: Romania
- Counties: Mureș County
- Villages: Viișoara, Zagăr

Physical characteristics
- Mouth: Târnava Mică
  - location: Coroi
  - coordinates: 46.3961°N 24.6438°E
- Length: 17 km (11 mi)
- Basin size: 59 km^{2} (23 sq mi)

Basin features
- Progression: Târnava Mică→ Târnava→ Mureș→ Tisza→ Danube→ Black Sea

The Domald is a left tributary of the river Târnava Mică in Romania. It discharges into the Târnava Mică in Coroi. Its length is 17 km (11 mi) and its basin size is 59 km^{2} (23 sq mi).
