= Ațel =

- Commune
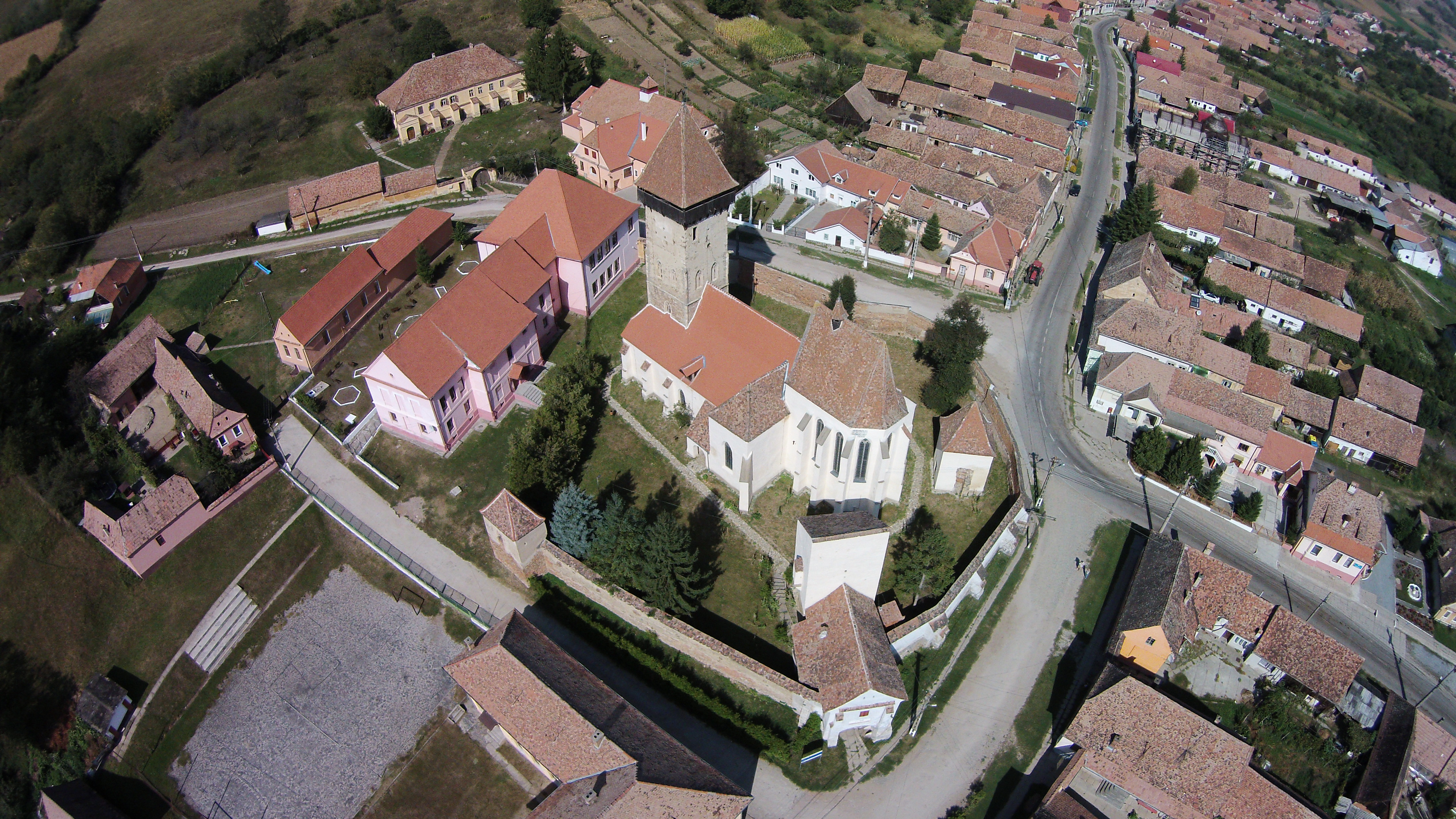
- Aerial view of Ațel with the local medieval Evangelical Lutheran fortified church in the centre

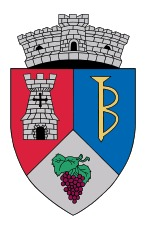
- Coat of arms

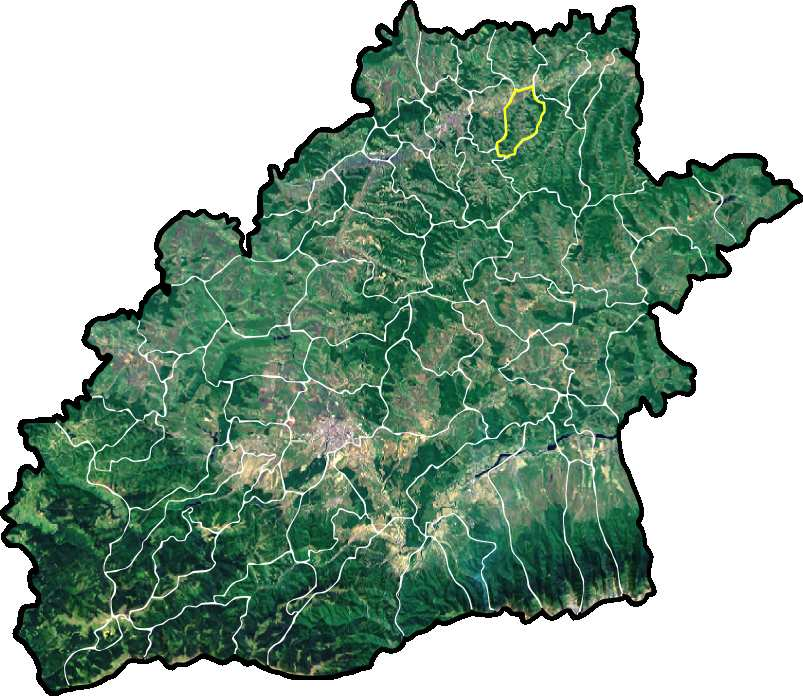
- Location in Sibiu County

- Location in Romania
- Coordinates: 46°09′N 24°28′E
- Country: Romania
- County: Sibiu
- Established: 1283 (first attested)
- Subdivisions: Ațel, Dupuș

Government
  - Mayor (2020–2024): Ioan-Ovidiu Aldea (PNL)
- Area: 27.21 km^{2} (10.51 sq mi)
- Elevation: 355 m (1,165 ft)
- Population (2021-12-01): 1,263
  - Density: 46.42/km^{2} (120.2/sq mi)
- Time zone: UTC+02:00 (EET)
  - Summer (DST): UTC+03:00 (EEST)
- Postal code: 557020
- Area code: (+40) 0269
- Vehicle reg.: SB
- Website: www.primaria-atel.ro

Ațel (German: Hetzeldorf; Transylvanian Saxon: Hätselderf; Hungarian: Ecel) is a commune in Sibiu County, Transylvania, Romania. It is composed of two villages, Ațel and Dupuș (Tobsdorf; Táblás).

The commune first appears in written history in 1283 as villa Echelini. Later appearances in written documents are villa Heclini (1289), Hetzelini villa and villa Eczlen (1359), Ecczel (1365), and Heczeldorf (1548). A church is mentioned as of 1380.

== Demographics ==
Population numbers (grouped by ethnicity) from 1850 to 2021:

Year	Romanians	Roma	Hungarians	Germans (Transylvanian Saxons)	Jews	Slovaks	Russians	Other/ Unknown	Total
1850	2,078	152	454	1,359	19	-	-	-	4,062
1900	671	-	24	1,350	-	-	-	2	2,047
1941	718	-	24	1,690	-	-	-	1	2,433
1977	867	-	15	1,255	-	-	-	210	2,347
1992	2,672	205	585	263	-	-	-	-	3,726
2002	1,288	118	34	92	-	6	-	2	1,540
2011	1,138	154	20	77	-	-	3	37	1,429
2021	1,018	86	16	57	-	-	-	86	1,263

== Local architecture ==
The local medieval Evangelical Lutheran fortified church of Ațel was built by the native Transylvanian Saxon community and completed by the end of the 15th century; it is surrounded by double walls. Above the entrance rises the Old School tower, and close by is the Oat Tower. The fortified church of Dupuș was also built during the 15th century.
