= Tătârlaua =

- Location within Romania

Location
- Country: Romania
- Counties: Alba
- Villages: Crăciunelu de Sus, Tătârlaua

Physical characteristics
- Mouth: Balta
  - location: Tătârlaua
  - coordinates: 46.2207°N 24.1951°E
- Length: 11 km (6.8 mi)
- Basin size: 38 km^{2} (15 sq mi)

Basin features
- Progression: Balta→ Târnava Mică→ Târnava→ Mureș→ Tisza→ Danube→ Black Sea

The Tătârlaua is a left tributary of the river Balta in Romania. It discharges into the Balta near Cetatea de Baltă. Its length is 11 km (6.8 mi) and its basin size is 38 km^{2} (15 sq mi).
