= Măgheruș (Mureș) =

Măgheruș Aluniș
- Location within Romania

Location
- Country: Romania
- Counties: Harghita County
- Towns: Toplița

Physical characteristics
- Mouth: Mureș
  - location: Toplița
  - coordinates: 46.923°N 25.348°E
- Length: 12 km (7.5 mi)
- Basin size: 29 km^{2} (11 sq mi)

Basin features
- Progression: Mureș→ Tisza→ Danube→ Black Sea

The Măgheruș (also: Aluniș, Hungarian: Magyarós-patak) is a small river in the Gurghiu Mountains, Harghita County, central Romania. It is a left tributary of the river Mureș. It flows through the municipality Toplița, and joins the Mureș in the village Măgheruș (part of Toplița), where it is channelized. Its length is 12 km (7.5 mi) and its basin size is 29 km^{2} (11 sq mi). Its name is from the Hungarian "mogyoró", and means "Nutty Creek".
