= Matúš Repa =

Slovak footballer

Personal information
- Date of birth: 20 July 2002 (age 24)
- Place of birth: Galanta, Slovakia
- Height: 1.84 m (6 ft 0 in)
- Positions: Forward; winger

Youth career
- –2015: Slovan Galanta
- 2016–2018: Spartak Trnava
- 2018–2021: Atalanta

Senior career*
Years	Team	Apps	(Gls)
2021–2022	Senica	7	(0)
2022–2023	Slovan Galanta		
2023	MFK Vítkovice	10	(2)
2023–2024	RSC Hamsik Academy		
2024–	FC Jelka		

International career
2017	Slovakia U16	3	(1)
2019	Slovakia U17	2	(0)
2020	Slovakia U18	1	(0)
- * Club domestic league appearances and goals as of 10 July 2022

Matúš Repa (born 20 July 2002) is a Slovak footballer who plays as a forward for FC Jelka.

Repa played in the Slovan Galanta and Spartak Trnava academy before being scouted by Italian club Atalanta. After his time at the Italian club, he returned to Slovakia to play for FK Senica, debuting in September 2021. After financial problems that would lead to the bankruptcy of the club, Repa left to play for Slovan Galanta, MFK Vítkovice, Hamsik Academy and Jelka.

Repa has also played for multiple Slovak national youth teams.

== Club career ==
=== Youth career ===
Repa started his career in the academy of 3. Liga club Slovan Galanta. While in the youth academy of Spartak Trnava, Repa played two and a half seasons in the Slovak youth league. The team finished second among the older students in the Slovak youth championship. In the summer of 2018, Repa joined the youth academy of Atalanta, moving from Spartak Trnava. The Italian club scouted Repa at a tournament in Greece, where he played for the Slovak national U16 team.

=== FK Senica ===
On 7 September 2021, Repa signed with Slovak First Football League club FK Senica. He made his professional Fortuna Liga debut for Senica against Spartak Trnava on 29 October 2021, playing nine minutes in a 2–1 defeat. Repa scored his first goals for his club in a 5–1 away win against OŠK Bešeňová in the 4th round of the Slovak Cup, scoring a brace to secure Senica’s place in the next round. He got his first start for Senica in a 1–0 away win against FK Pohronie, playing the first half before being subbed off. He was a part of the Senica squad before for the winter preparations. Repa left the club after it was declared bankrupt.

=== Later career ===
After a successful trial at Czech side MFK Vítkovice of the third tier Moravian-Silesian Football League, Repa signed with the club in February 2023, leaving Slovan Galanta. He scored the only goal for Vítkovice in a 5–1 defeat to FC Hlučín.

Repa scored while on a trial at SK Prostějov, coming off the bench at half-time and scoring the equalizer in a 1–1 draw with 1. FC Slovácko. He was injured in a game against Sigma Olomouc B. Repa did not impress with his performances at Prostějov and wasn't offered a contract after the end of his trial.

In the winter of 2024, Repa signed with amateur club FC Jelka. He played in a 4–0 loss for Jelka in a Slovak Cup game against First Football League club DAC Dunajská Streda.

== International career ==
Repa got his first international nomination in 2018, playing in a youth tournament in Greece for the Slovakia under-16 team. In 2018, he was nominated to play a game against Hungary for the Slovakia national under-17 football team. A year later, Repa was also nominated to play two games against the Montenegro under-18 team. He scored his first goal for the under-18s in a 4–2 win over Romania.
