= Mintiu =

Mintiu (from Hungarian Németi, "Germans") may refer to several places in Romania:

- Mintiu, a former city incorporated in 1715 into what is now Satu Mare city, Satu Mare County
- Mintiu, a village in Nimigea Commune, Bistriţa-Năsăud County
- Mintiu Gherlii, a commune in Cluj County
- Mintia, a village in Vețel Commune, Hunedoara County
