= Alma, Romania =

Alma Küküllőalmás
- Commune
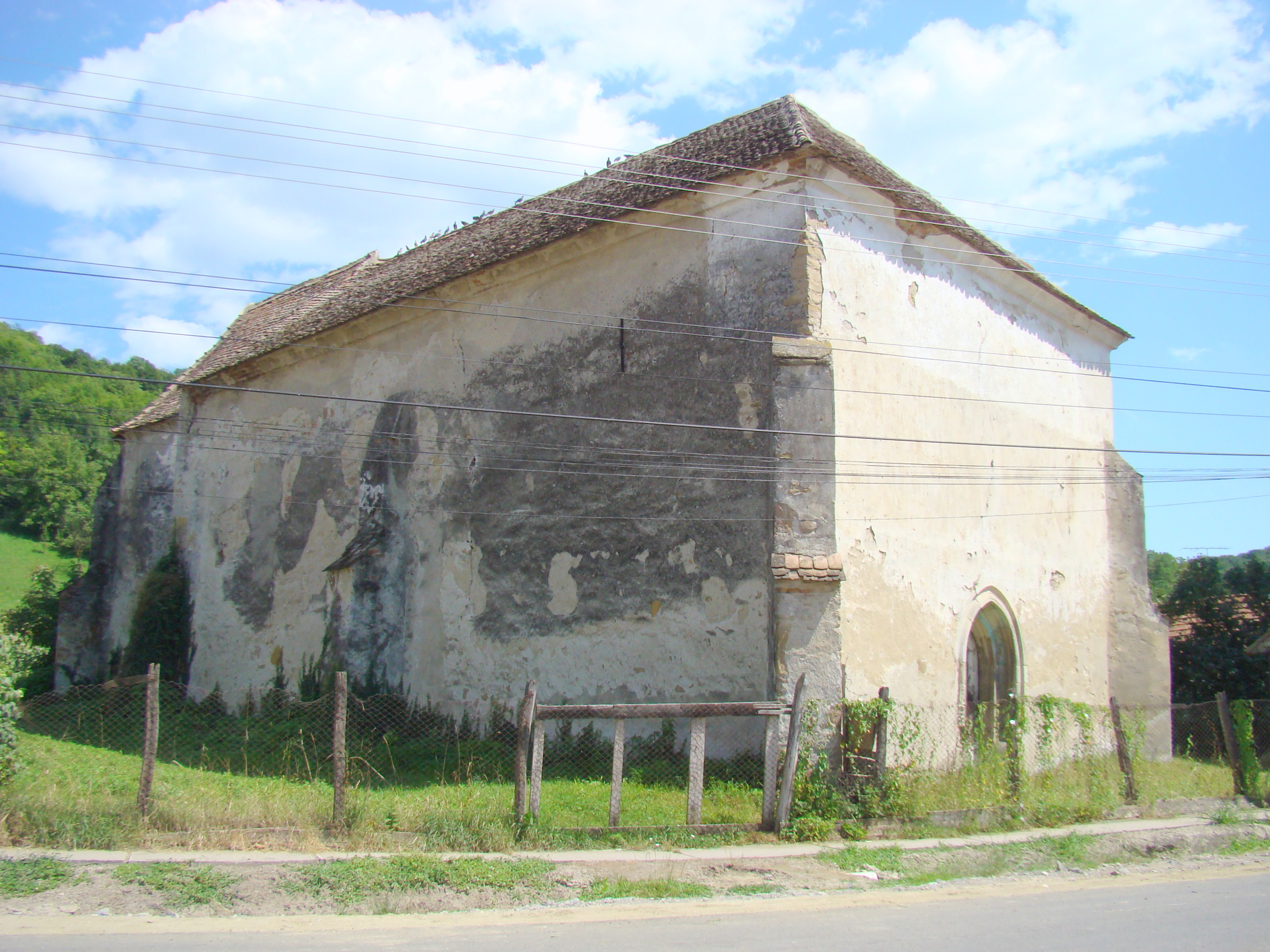
- Evangelical church in Șmig

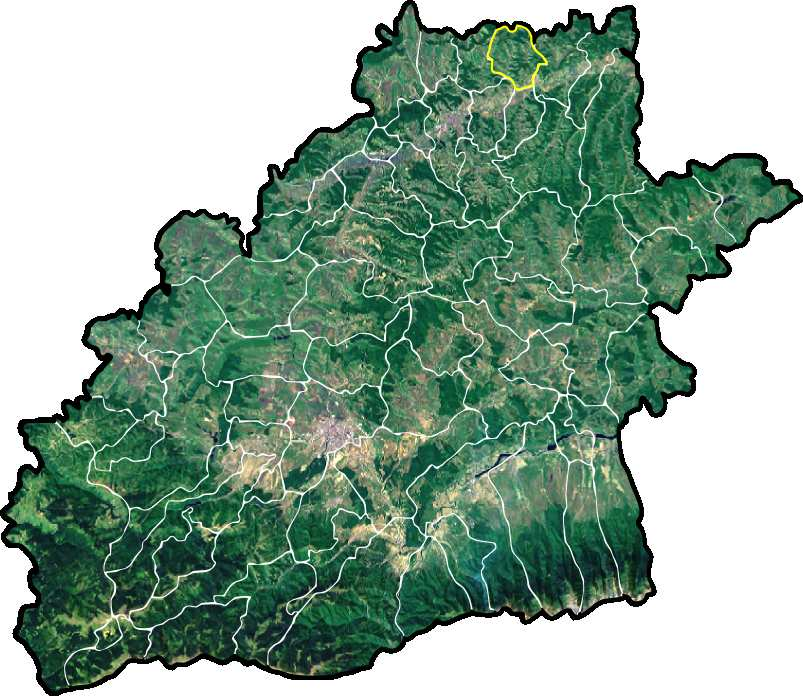
- Location in Sibiu County

- Location in Romania
- Coordinates: 46°13′N 24°29′E
- Country: Romania
- County: Sibiu

Government
  - Mayor (2020–2024): Alexandru-Bazil Curcean (PNL)
- Area: 36.29 km^{2} (14.01 sq mi)
- Elevation: 315 m (1,033 ft)
- Population (2021-12-01): 1,692
  - Density: 46.62/km^{2} (120.8/sq mi)
- Time zone: UTC+02:00 (EET)
  - Summer (DST): UTC+03:00 (EEST)
- Postal code: 557021
- Area code: +40 x59
- Vehicle reg.: SB
- Website: primariaalma.ro

Alma (Hungarian: Küküllőalmás; German: Almaschken) is a commune located in Sibiu County, Transylvania, Romania. It is composed of three villages: Alma, Giacăș (Gyákos; Jakobsdorf), and Șmig (Somogyom; Schmiegen).

Historical population
| Year | Pop. | ±% |
|---|---|---|
| 2002 | 2,100 | — |
| 2011 | 1,886 | −10.2% |
| 2021 | 1,692 | −10.3% |
Source: Census data

At the 2011 census, the commune had 1,886 inhabitants; of those, 70.1% were Romanians, 24.2% Hungarians, and 4.7% Roma. At the 2021 census, Alma had a population of 1,692; of those, 68.85% were Romanians, 20.98% Hungarians, and 4.79% Roma.
