= Coroisânmărtin =

- Commune
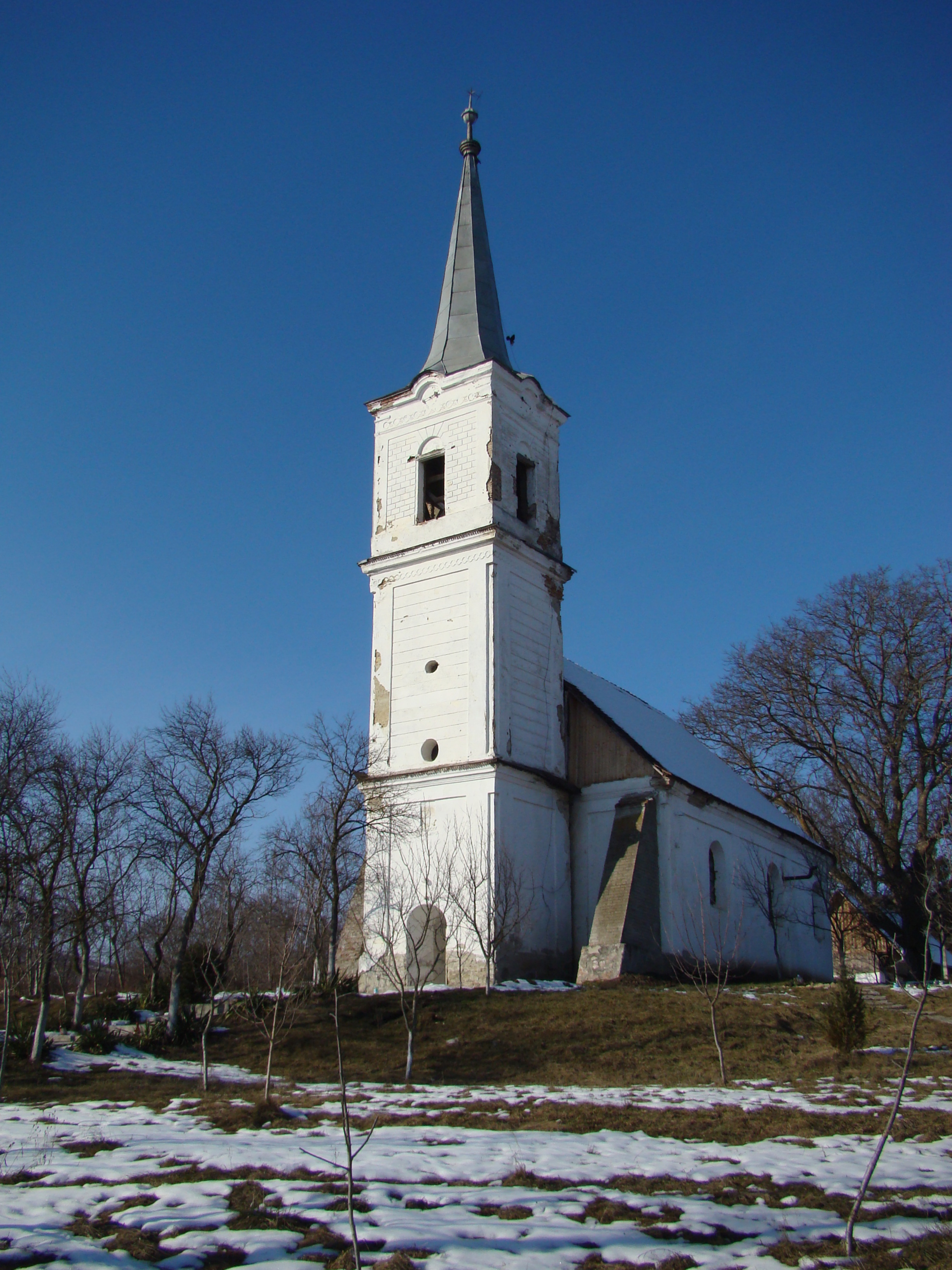
- Reformed church in Coroisânmărtin

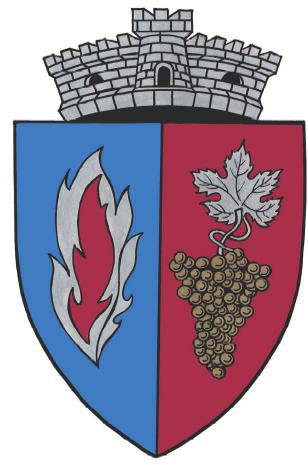
- Coat of arms

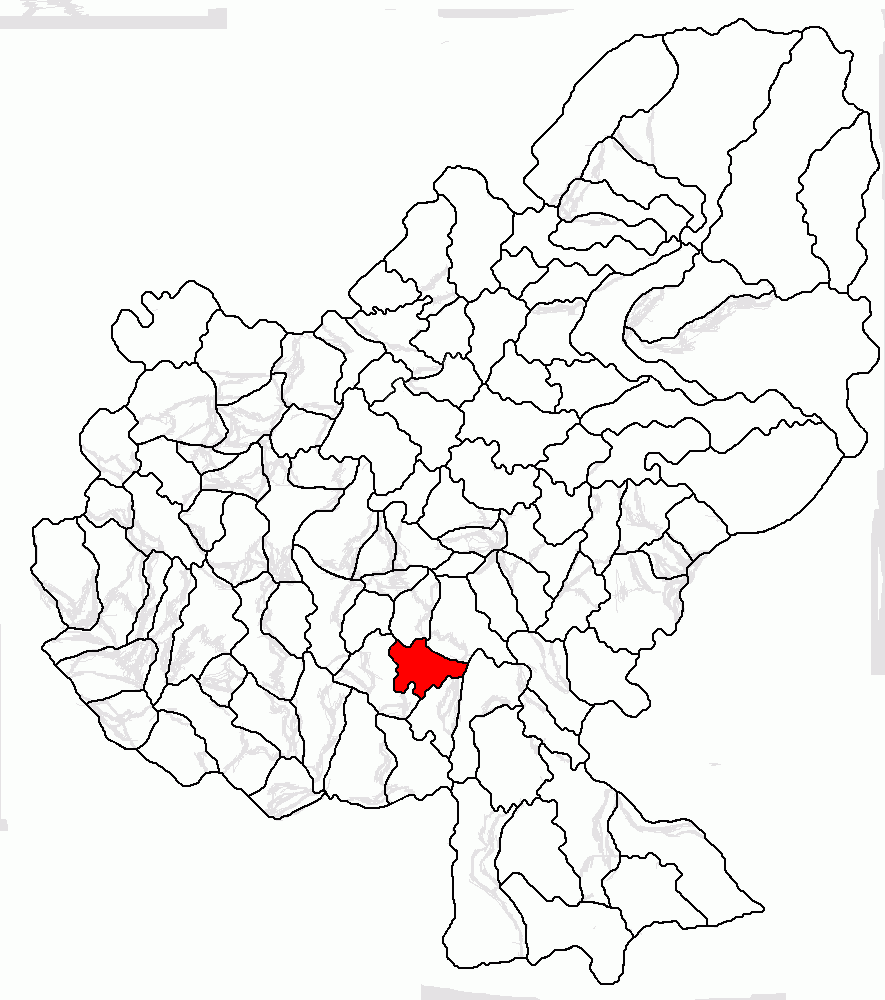
- Location in Mureș County

- Location in Romania
- Coordinates: 46°24′N 24°36′E
- Country: Romania
- County: Mureș

Government
  - Mayor (2020–2024): Nicolae Comerzan (PNL)
- Area: 27.39 km^{2} (10.58 sq mi)
- Elevation: 327 m (1,073 ft)
- Population (2021-12-01): 1,330
  - Density: 48.6/km^{2} (126/sq mi)
- Time zone: UTC+02:00 (EET)
  - Summer (DST): UTC+03:00 (EEST)
- Postal code: 547165
- Area code: (+40) 0265
- Vehicle reg.: MS
- Website: comunacoroisinmartin.ro

Coroisânmărtin (Hungarian: Kóródszentmárton, Hungarian pronunciation: [korodsɛntmaːrton]) is a commune in Mureș County, Transylvania, Romania. It is composed of four villages: Coroi (Kóród), Coroisânmărtin, Odrihei (Vámosudvarhely), and Șoimuș (Küküllősolymos).

The commune is located in the south-central part of the county, on the banks of the Târnava Mică River, at a distance of 28 km (17 mi) from Târnăveni and 37 km (23 mi) from the county seat, Târgu Mureș.

According to the 2011 census, there were 1,447 living in Coroisânmărtin at the time; of this population, 56.05% were ethnic Romanians, 22.94% were ethnic Hungarians, and 15.34% were ethnic Roma. At the 2021 census, the commune had a population of 1,330; of those, 47.29% were Romanians, 25.71% Roma, and 18.2% Hungarians.

== See also ==
- List of Hungarian exonyms (Mureș County)
