= Râpa (Mureș) =

Râpa Répa-patak
- Location within Romania

Location
- Country: Romania
- Counties: Mureș County
- Villages: Vătava, Râpa de Jos

Physical characteristics
- Mouth: Mureș
  - location: Vălenii de Mureș
  - coordinates: 46°53′26″N 24°48′00″E
- Length: 15 km (9.3 mi)
- Basin size: 23 km^{2} (8.9 sq mi)

Basin features
- Progression: Mureș→ Tisza→ Danube→ Black Sea

The Râpa (Hungarian: Répa-patak) is a right tributary of the river Mureș in Transylvania, Romania. It discharges into the Mureș in Vălenii de Mureș. Its length is 15 km (9.3 mi) and its basin size is 23 km^{2} (8.9 sq mi).
