= Viișoara, Mureș =

Viișoara
- Commune
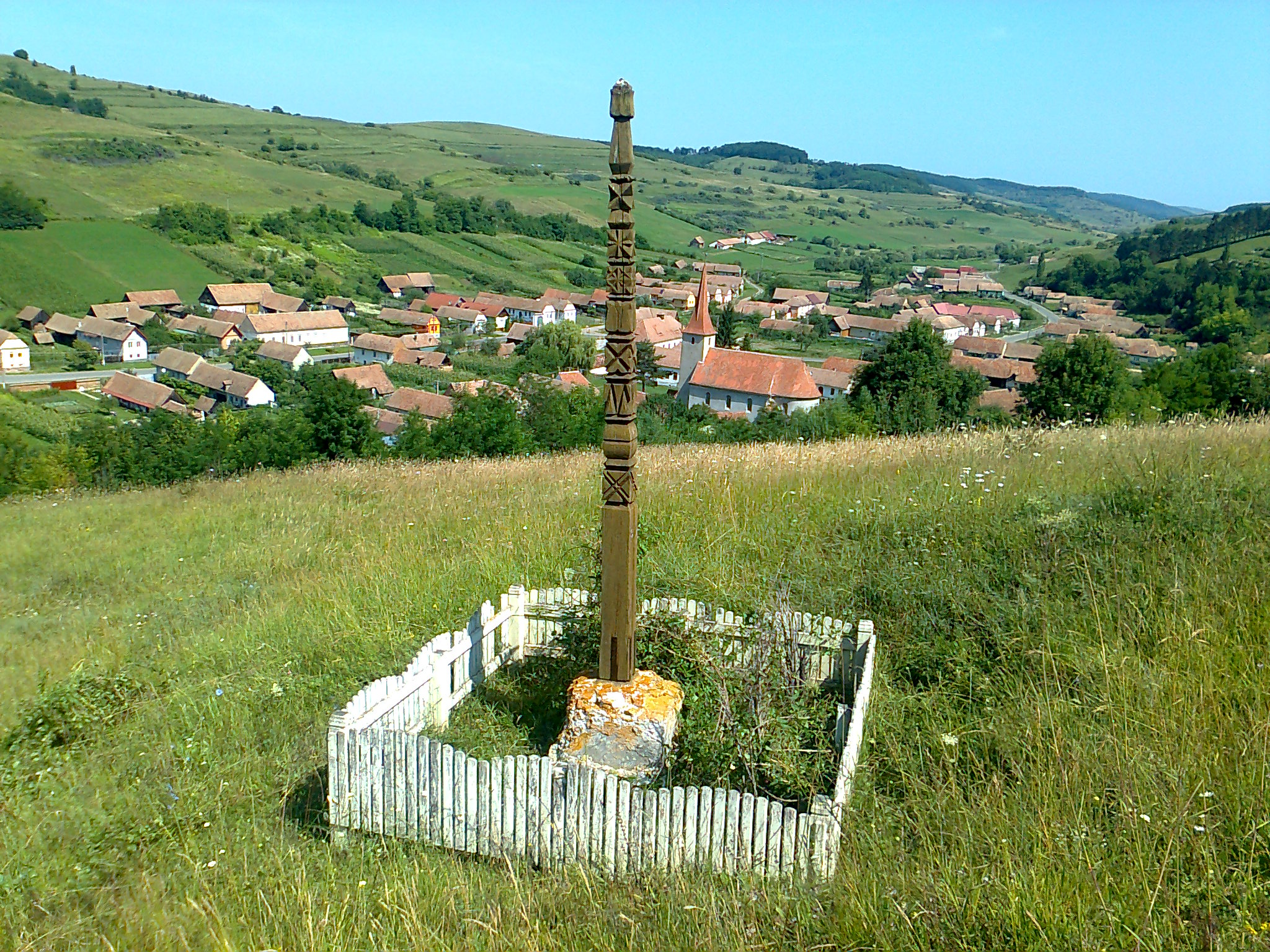
- Viișoara

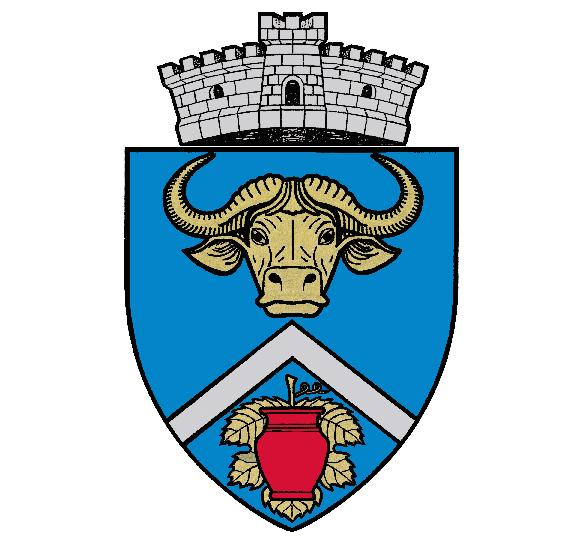
- Coat of arms

- Location in Mureș County

- Location in Romania
- Coordinates: 46.29°N 24.6°E
- Country: Romania
- County: Mureș

Government
  - Mayor (2020–2024): Ovidiu Dorel Stoica (PSD)
- Area: 66.87 km^{2} (25.82 sq mi)
- Elevation: 375 m (1,230 ft)
- Population (2021-12-01): 1,802
  - Density: 26.95/km^{2} (69.79/sq mi)
- Time zone: UTC+02:00 (EET)
  - Summer (DST): UTC+03:00 (EEST)
- Postal code: 547645
- Area code: +40 x59
- Vehicle reg.: MS
- Website: viisoarams.ro

Viișoara (German: Hohndorf; Hungarian: Csatófalva; Hungarian pronunciation: [ˈtʃɒtoːfɒlvɒ]) is a commune in Mureș County, Transylvania, Romania that is composed of three villages: Ormeniș (Irmesch; Szászörményes), Sântioana (Johannisdorf; Szászszentiván), and Viișoara.

== Geography ==
The commune is situated on the Transylvanian Plateau, on the bank of the rivers Domald and Sântioana, at an altitude of 375 m (1,230 ft). It is located in the southern part of Mureș County, 40 km (25 mi) from the county seat, Târgu Mureș, on the border with Sibiu County. Viișoara is crossed by county road DJ142C, which joins it to Bălăușeri, 18 km (11 mi) to the northeast, and to Dumbrăveni, 9 km (5.6 mi) to the south.

== Demographics ==
Historical population
| Year | Pop. | ±% |
|---|---|---|
| 2002 | 1,663 | — |
| 2011 | 1,659 | −0.2% |
| 2021 | 1,802 | +8.6% |
Source: Census data

At the 2002 census, the commune had a population of 1,663: 70% Romanians, 25% Roma, 3% Hungarians, and 2% Germans. At the 2011 census, there were 1,659 inhabitants, of which 60.76% Romanians, 31.95% Roma, 1.75% Hungarians, and 1.69% Germans. At the 2021 census, Viișoara had a population of 1,802, of which 67.54% Romanians, 20.14% Roma, 2.89% Germans, and 1.78% Hungarians.
