= Archita, Mureș =

Archita
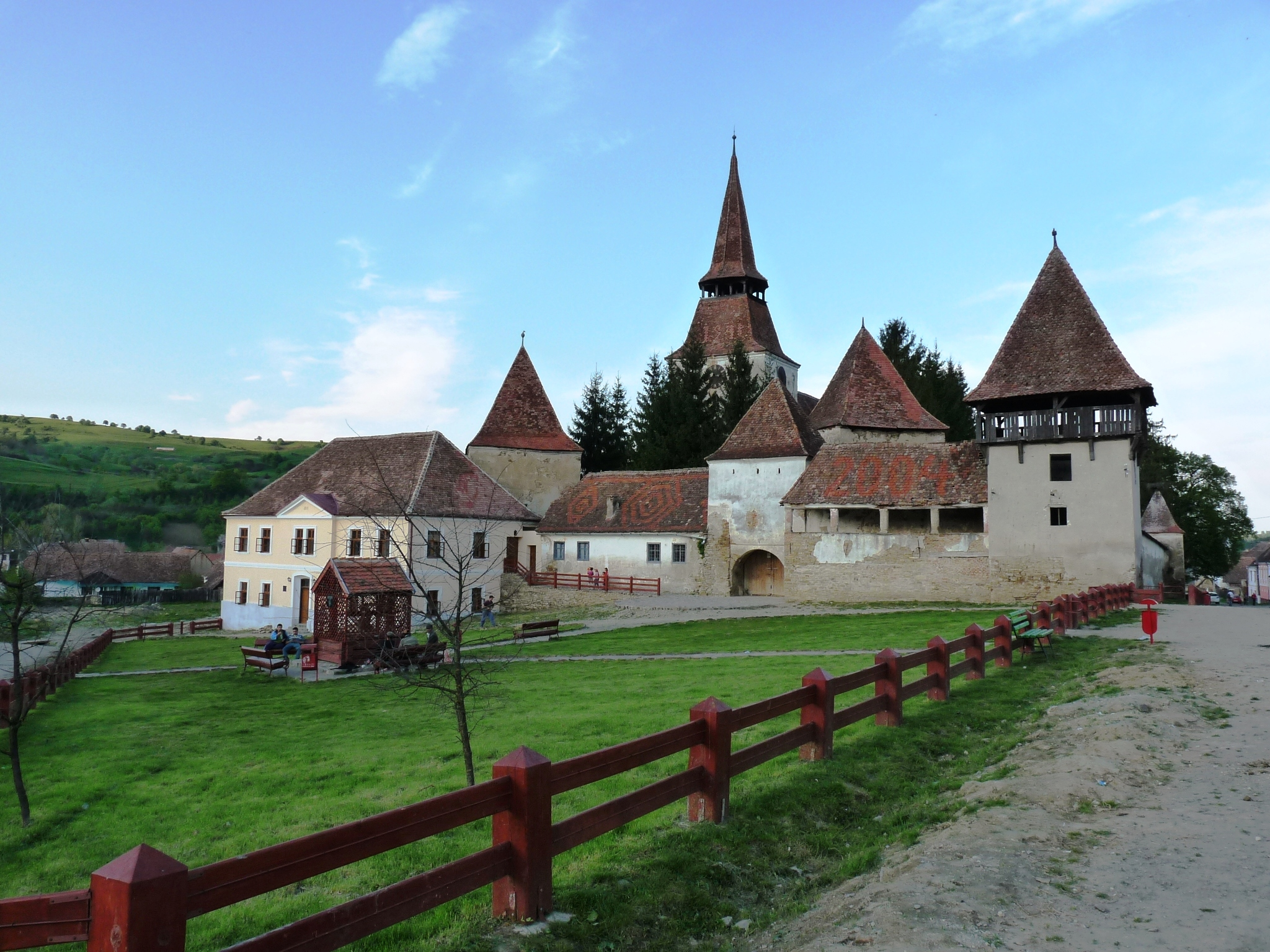
- The Evangelical-Lutheran Fortified Church of Archita
- Interactive map of Archita
- Coordinates: 46°10′50″N 25°5′14″E
- Country: Romania
- County: Mureș County
- Commune: Vânători
- Postal code: 547636

Archita (German: Arkeden, Hungarian: Erked) is a village in Romania, part of the commune of Vânători, Mureș County, Transylvania. Traditionally a Transylvanian Saxon town and the site of a fortified church, it is a modern tourist destination, also being on the route of the Via Transilvanica long-distance trail.

== Name ==
Archita, the Romanian name of the village, is also known as Arkeden bei Schäßburg in German, while the Hungarian name is Erked. Arkeden bei Schäßburg, or Arkeden in short, could derive its name from the Hungarian toponym Erked or a Germanic anthroponym (Archo or Ercho), its name being first mentioned in 1356 as Erkud. In the Transylvanian Saxon dialect, its name is variously rendered: Ärkeden, Ârkeden or Arkedn.

== History ==
Archita within the Schäßburger Stuhl.

Prior to the arrival of the Transylvanian Saxons, the area in which Archita now lies was occupied by the Székely people with an old enclave of Romanians living to the north of the village. It was founded as Arkeden by the Saxons as an agricultural centre. As one of the oldest settlements of the Schäßburger Stuhl (the administrative seat of Sighișoara), it was probably in existence by the end of the 12th century.

From the 14th century onward, the local nobility start to be historically recorded. For example, Nicholas of Archita owned parts of the village.

It remained a German-speaking settlement until the 1980s when its population, having been reduced to poverty by the communist regime of Nicolae Ceaușescu, emigrated to accept German citizenship. By 2009, there were just three Saxons left in the village and, with some building abandoned, the historic layout of the village is no longer clearly visible.

Recently, the population has been approximately 50% ethnic Romanian and 50% Romani people.

The village is often known on account of its 13th century fortified Lutheran church (a member of the Evangelical Church of Augustan Confession in Romania). There is also a Romanian Orthodox Church in the village whose building dates from 1894.

In May 2011, Prince Charles visited Archita to see the restoration work being carried out by the Maria Nobrega Foundation.
