= Vătava =

- Commune
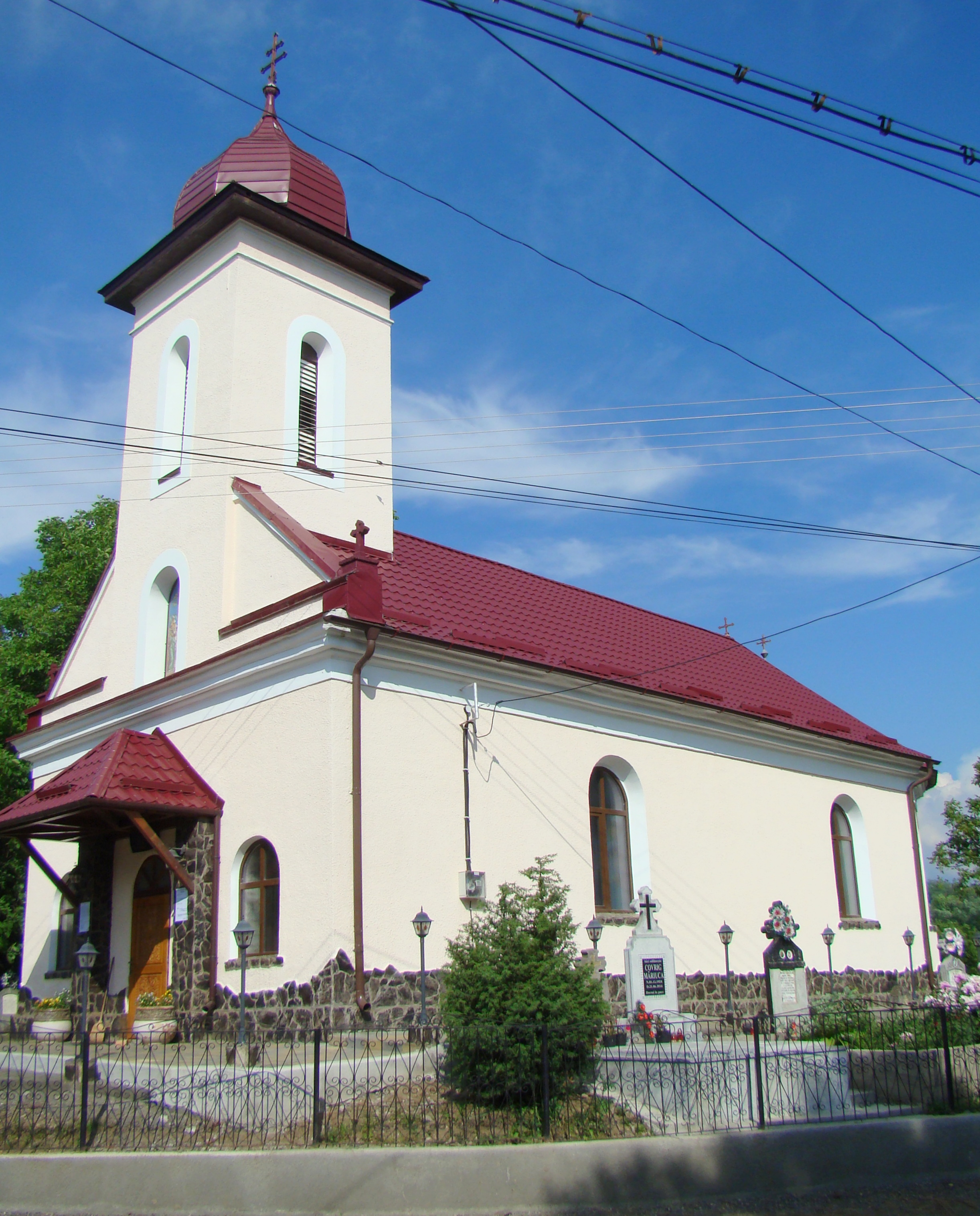
- Church of the Ascension in Râpa de Jos

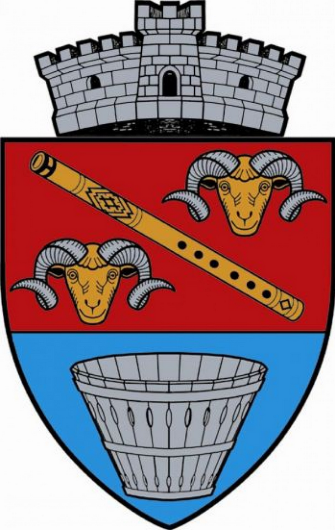
- Coat of arms

- Location in Mureș County

- Location in Romania
- Coordinates: 46°58′N 24°46′E
- Country: Romania
- County: Mureș

Government
  - Mayor (2024–2028): Emil Bendriș (PSD)
- Area: 168.80 km^{2} (65.17 sq mi)
- Elevation: 648 m (2,126 ft)
- Population (2021-12-01): 1,709
  - Density: 10.12/km^{2} (26.22/sq mi)
- Time zone: UTC+02:00 (EET)
  - Summer (DST): UTC+03:00 (EEST)
- Postal code: 547630
- Area code: (+40) 02 65
- Vehicle reg.: MS
- Website: vatava.ro

Vătava (German: Oberrübendorf; Hungarian: Felsőrépa, Hungarian pronunciation: [ˈfɛlʃøːreːpɒ]) is a commune in Mureș County, Transylvania, Romania composed of three villages: Dumbrava (Marosliget), Râpa de Jos (Alsórépa), and Vătava.

== Demographics ==
At the 2011 census, the commune had a population of 1,987: 91% Romanians, 6.8% Roma, and 0.2% Hungarians. At the 2021 census, the population had decreased to 1,709; of those, 87.5% were Romanians and 7.1% Roma.

== International relations ==
Until 2009, Vătava was twinned with Laval, France.
