= Hoghilag =

- Commune
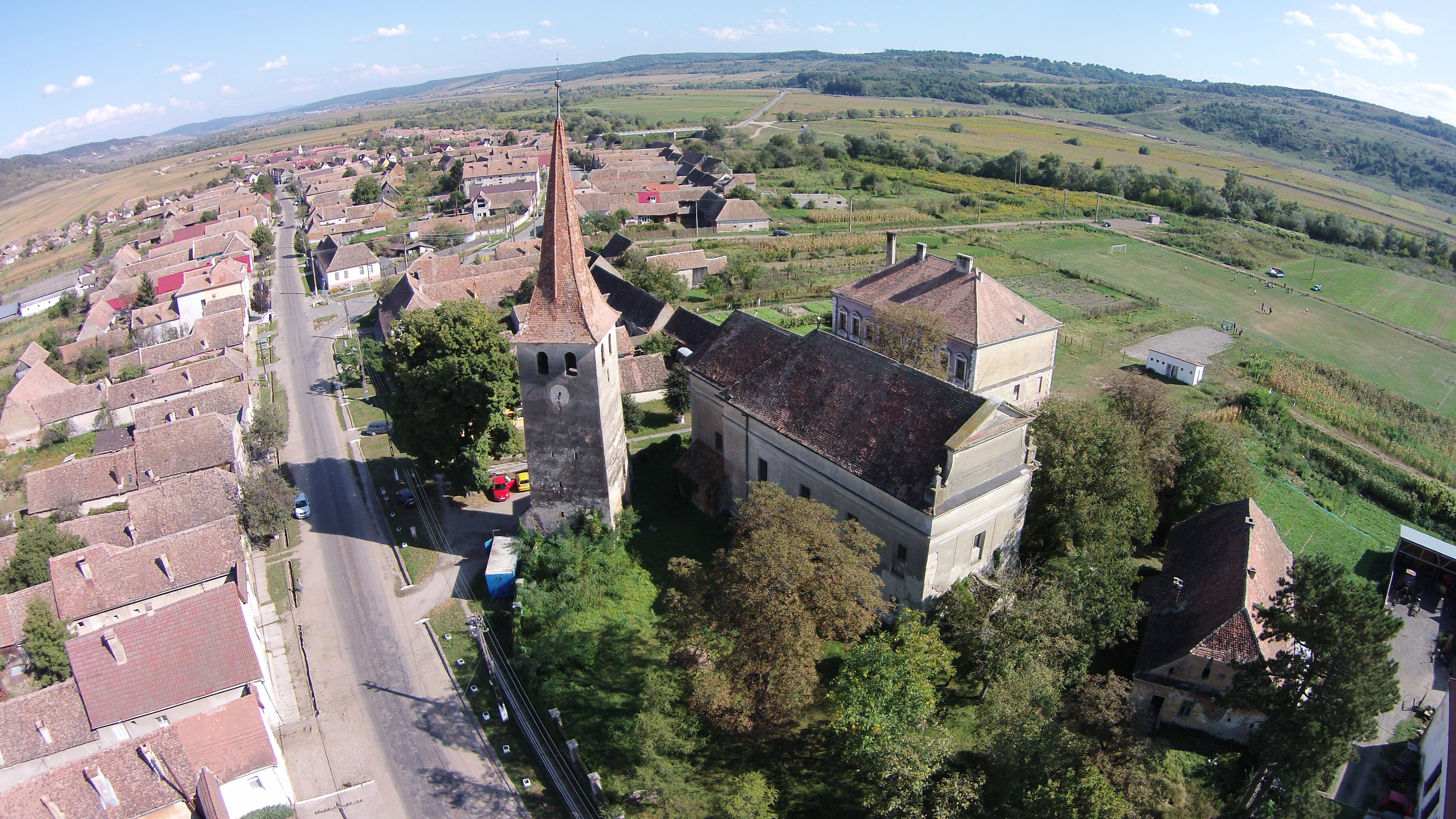
- Overview of Hoghilag

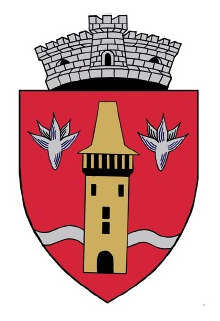
- Coat of arms

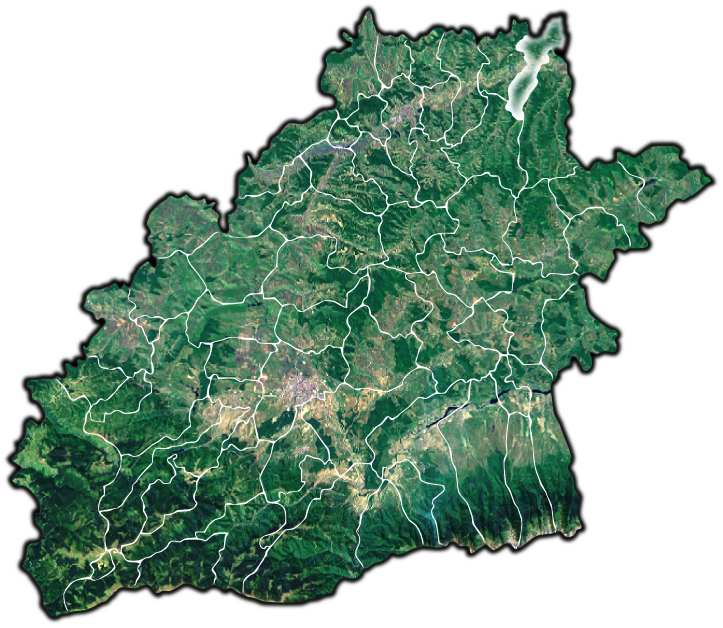
- Location in Sibiu County

- Location in Romania
- Coordinates: 46°14′N 24°37′E
- Country: Romania
- County: Sibiu

Government
  - Mayor (2024–2028): Nicolae Lazăr (PSD)
- Area: 52.13 km^{2} (20.13 sq mi)
- Elevation: 327 m (1,073 ft)
- Population (2021-12-01): 2,123
  - Density: 40.73/km^{2} (105.5/sq mi)
- Time zone: UTC+02:00 (EET)
  - Summer (DST): UTC+03:00 (EEST)
- Postal code: 557100
- Area code: +40 x59
- Vehicle reg.: SB
- Website: hoghilag.ro

Hoghilag (German: Halvelagen; Hungarian: Holdvilág) is a commune located in Sibiu County, Transylvania, central Romania. It is composed of three villages, namely: Hoghilag, Prod (German: Pruden; Hungarian: Prod), and Valchid (German: Waldhütten; Hungarian: Váldhíd). The fortified church of Prod was demolished in 1902, while the fortified church of Valchid is still in a relatively good shape.

The commune is located in the northern part of the county, on the border with Mureș County. It is situated on the Transylvanian Plateau, on the right bank of the Târnava Mare River. The nearest town is Dumbrăveni, 4 km (2.5 mi) to the west on county road DJ142E. The city of Mediaș is 26 km (16 mi) to the west, while the capital of the county, Sibiu, is 80 km (50 mi) to the southwest; both can be reached via national road DN14.

About 200,000 tuberoses are grown on 4 ha (9.9 acres) in the commune, in gardens and protected areas; there are some 40 tuberose growers, half cultivating the plant for commercial purposes, and the others as a hobby and for decorative purposes. Thousands of tourists attend the annual two-day Tuberoses Festival in Hoghilag.

At the 2011 census, Hoghilag had 2,172 inhabitants; of those, 72% were Romanians, 23.6% Roma, 3.3% Hungarians, and 1% Germans (more specifically, Transylvanian Saxons). At the 2021 census, the commune had a population of 2,123; of those, 52% were Romanians, 32.36% Roma, and 1.37% Hungarians.

== Gallery ==
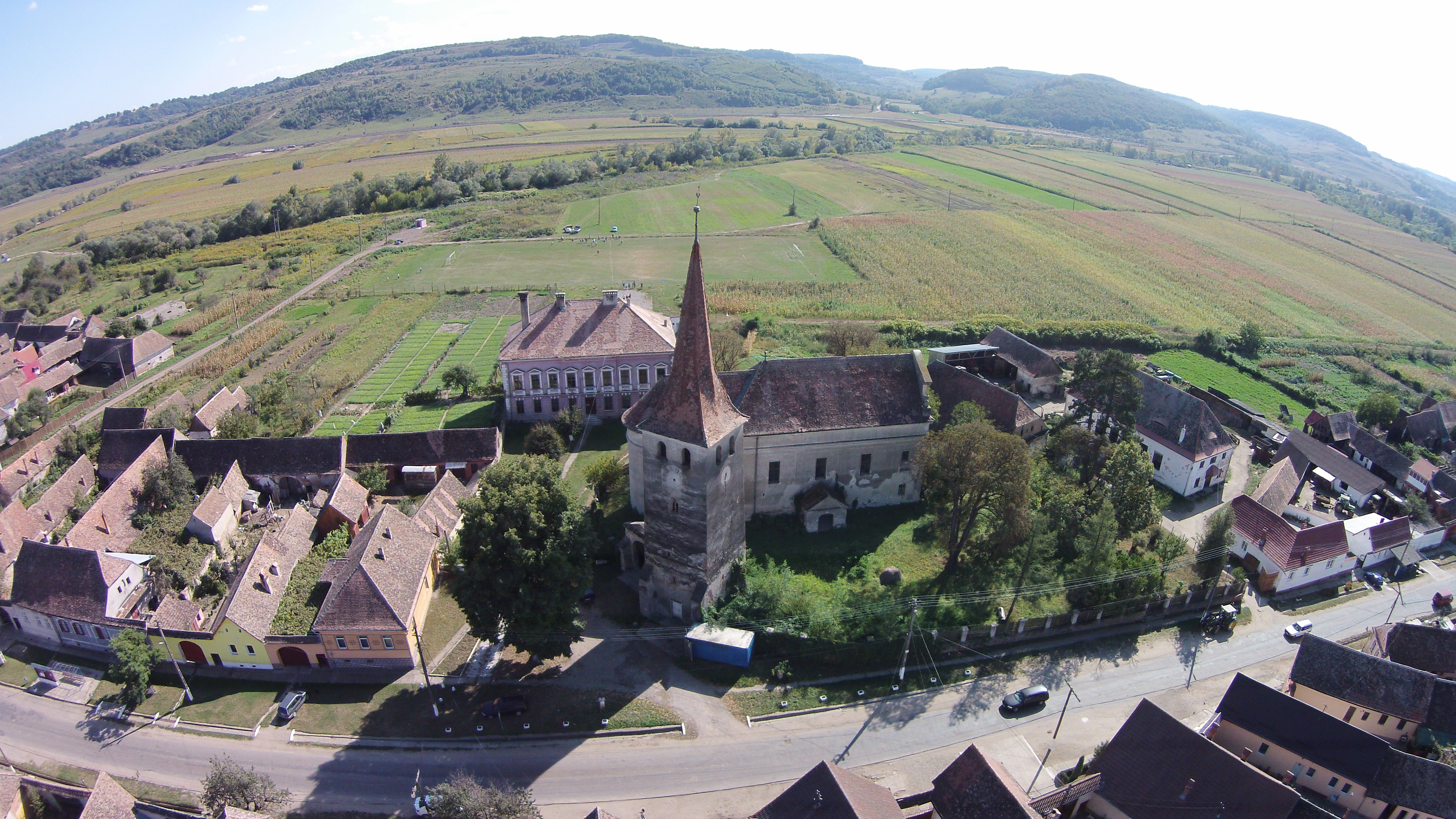
Overview of Hoghilag

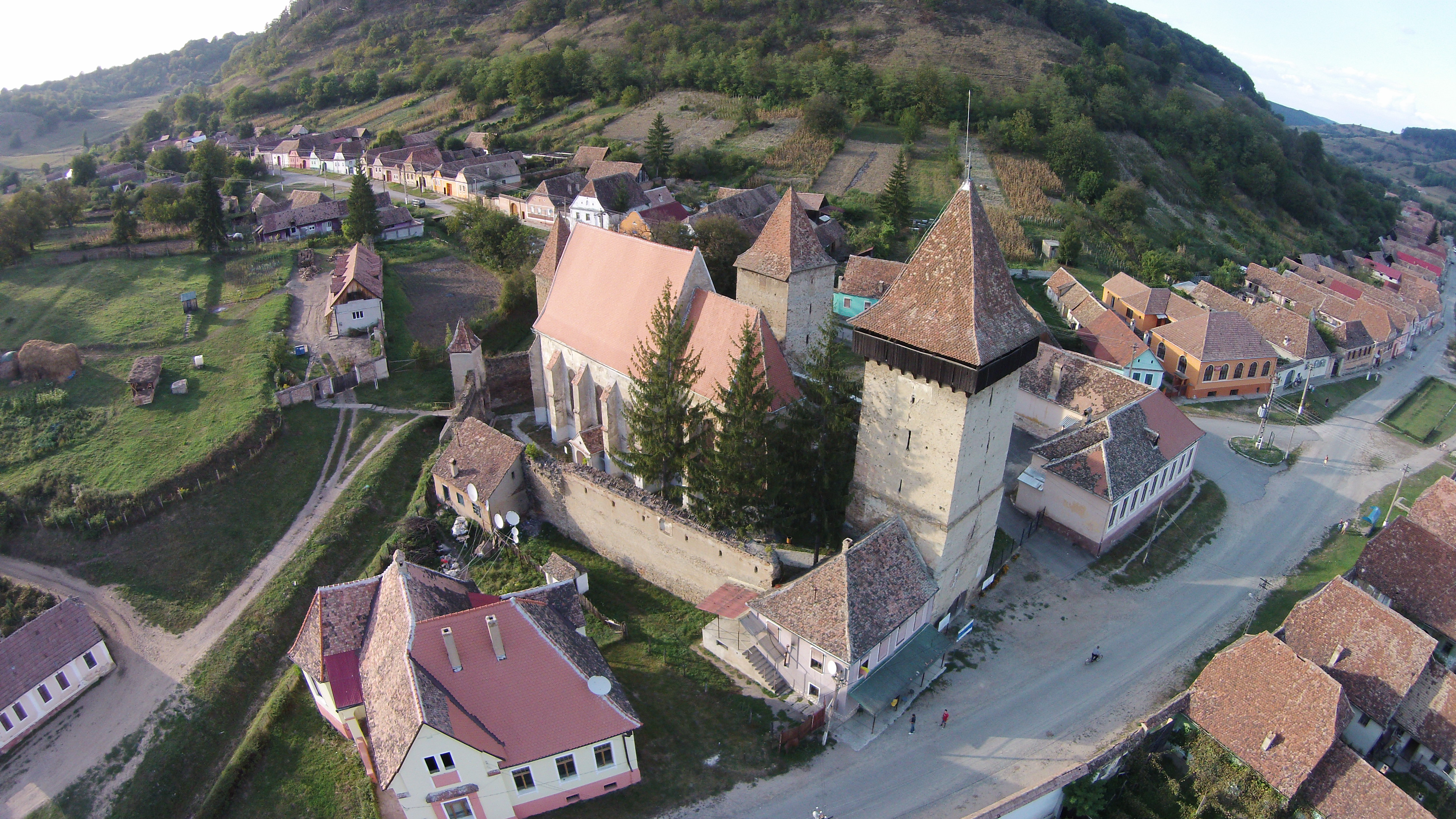
Transylvanian Saxon medieval fortified Evangelical Lutheran church in Valchid

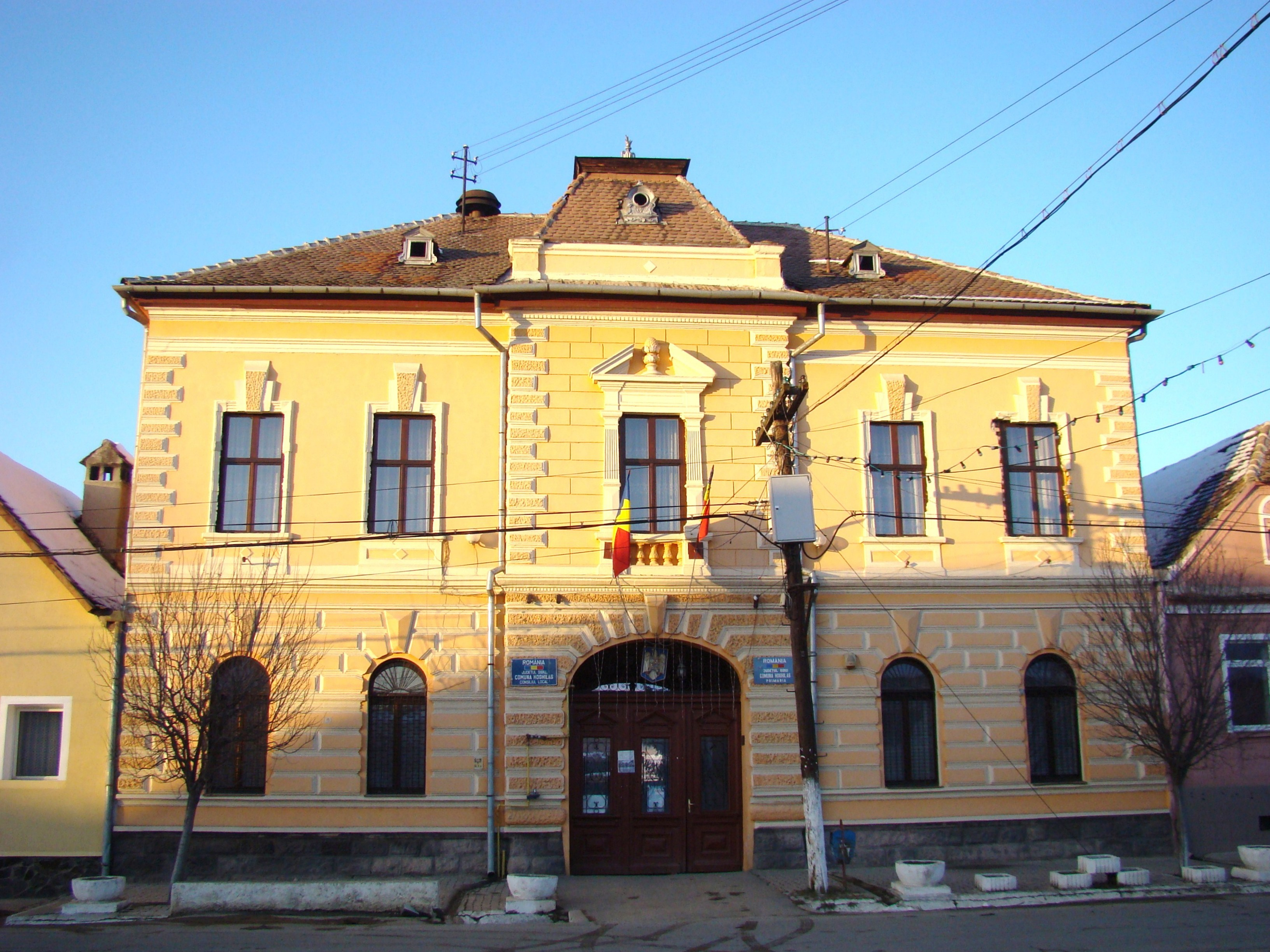
Town hall of Hoghilag

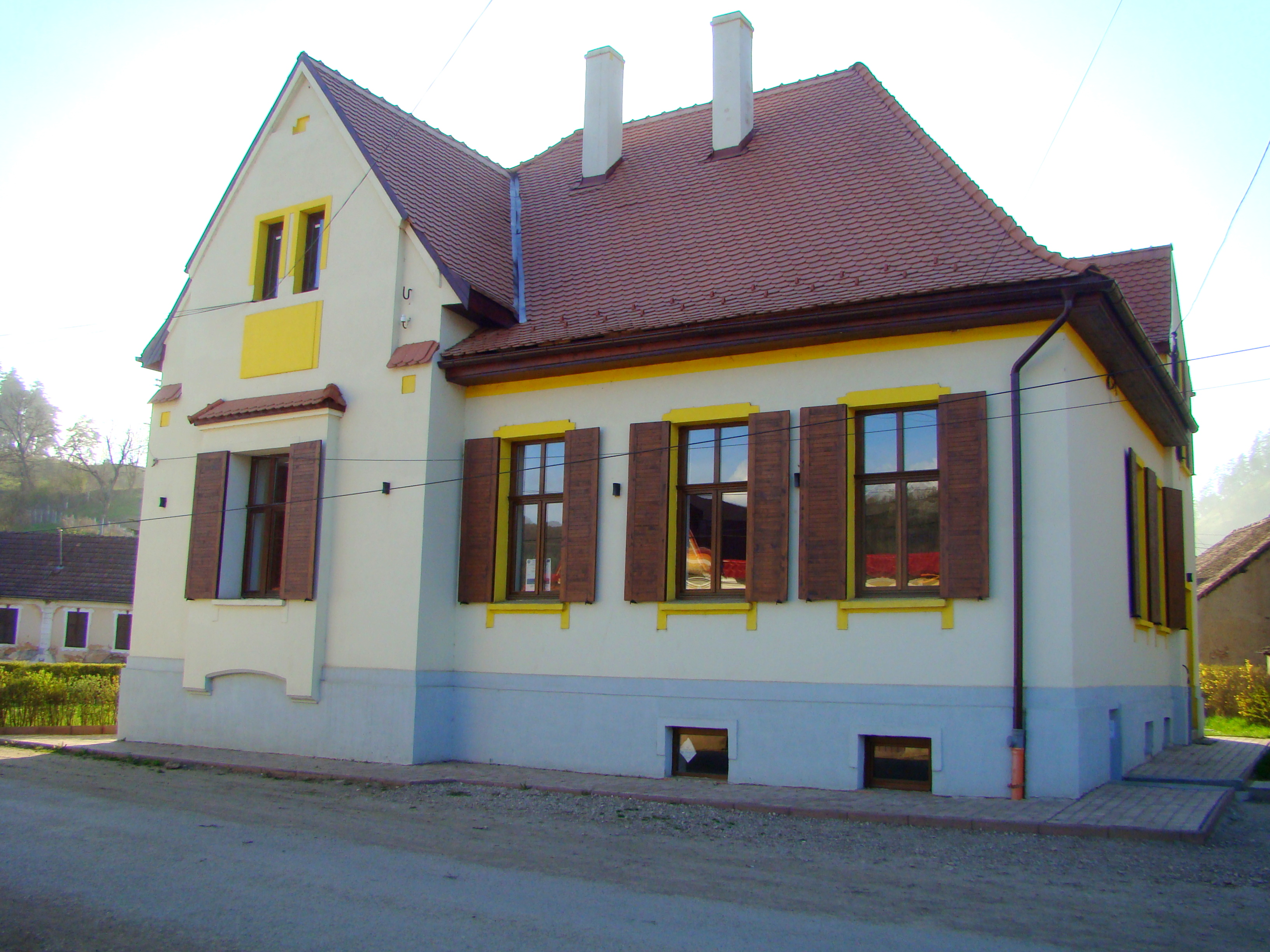
Valchid

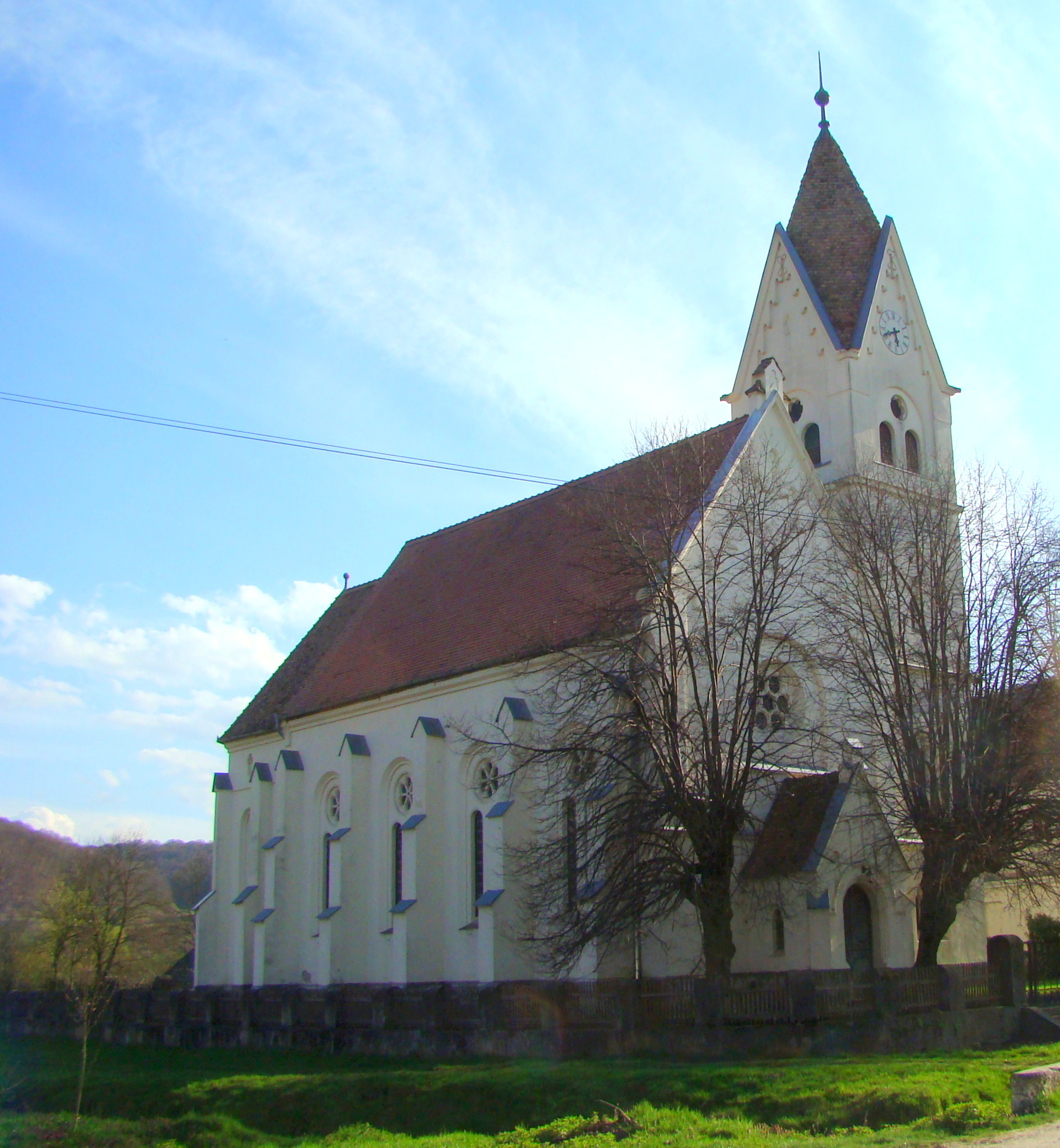
Transylvanian Saxon medieval fortified Evangelical Lutheran church in Prod
