= Jidvei =

- Commune
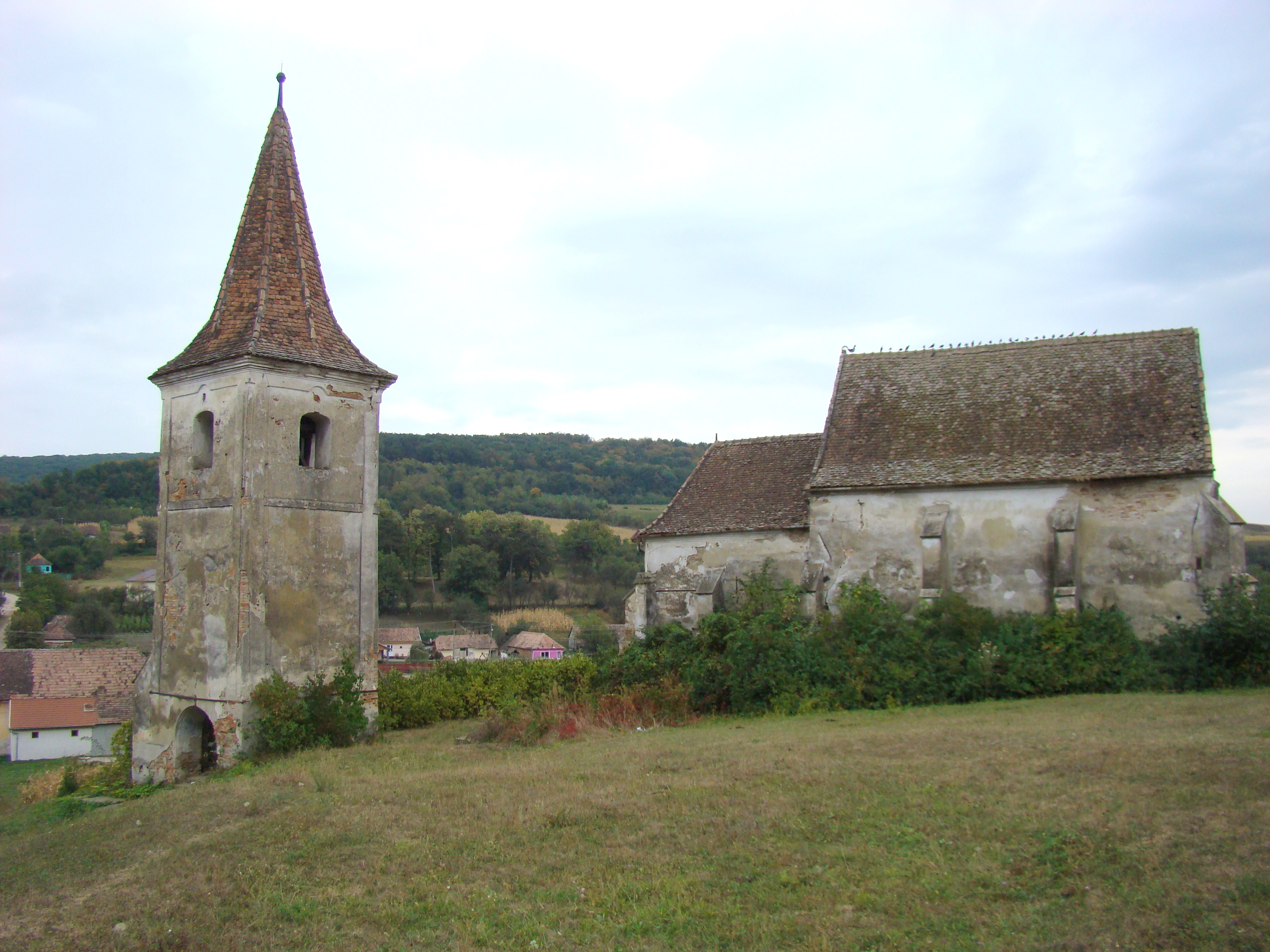
- Evangelical Lutheran Church in Veseuș

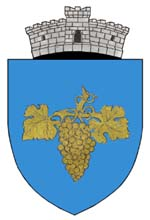
- Coat of arms

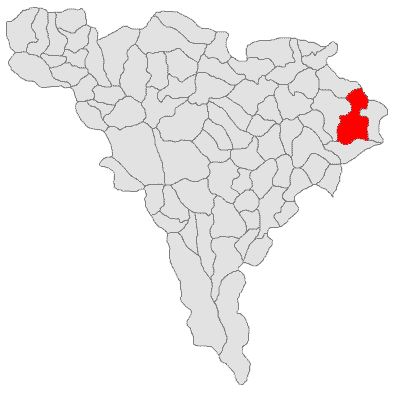
- Location in Alba County

- Location in Romania
- Coordinates: 46°13′N 24°06′E
- Country: Romania
- County: Alba

Government
  - Mayor (2020–2024): Alin Trif (PNL)
- Area: 105.13 km^{2} (40.59 sq mi)
- Elevation: 317 m (1,040 ft)
- Population (2021-12-01): 5,020
  - Density: 47.8/km^{2} (124/sq mi)
- Time zone: UTC+02:00 (EET)
  - Summer (DST): UTC+03:00 (EEST)
- Postal code: 517385
- Area code: (+40) 02 58
- Vehicle reg.: AB
- Website: www.primariajidvei.ro

Jidvei (Romanian pronunciation: [ʒidˈvej], Hungarian: Zsidve, German: Seiden) is a commune in Alba County, Transylvania, Romania, located on the river Târnava. Jidvei is located in the north-western part of Romania, in the Transylvanian Plateau. Jidvei was first mentioned in documents in 1309, but traces of human presence go further back in time. The oldest building in the village is the church, which was originally constructed in the Gothic style but was later modified in 1707 in the baroque style. In the 15th century, a fortification wall was raised around the church, of which the gate tower remains.

Jidvei is located in the Târnava wine country, where vineyards have been present since the Iron Age. Winemaking has been an important local industry throughout the history of Jidvei. In the middle age, the doors of the cellars in Jidvei were built to face the road for commercial purposes. Jidvei is currently one of the most important wine producing regions in Romania.

The commune is composed of five villages: Bălcaciu (Bolkatsch or Bulkesch; Bolkács), Căpâlna de Jos (Gergesdorf; Alsókápolna), Feisa (Füssen; Küküllőfajsz), Jidvei and Veseuș (Michelsdorf; Szásznagyvesszős).

At the 2011 census, Jidvei had a population of 4,617, of which 71.3% were Romanians, 24.8% Roma and 2.6% Hungarians. At the 2021 census, the population of the commune increased to 5,020; of those, 62.65% were Romanians, 29.86% Roma, 1.91% Hungarians, and 1.24% Germans.

Historical population
Year	Pop.	±%
1850	4,696	—
1900	5,439	+15.8%
1941	6,800	+25.0%
1977	6,720	−1.2%
1992	5,354	−20.3%
2002	5,244	−2.1%
2011	4,617	−12.0%
2021	5,020	+8.7%
Source: INS, Census data

== Natives ==
- Răzvan Trif (born 1997), footballer
- Veta Biriș (born 1949), folk music singer
