= Vânători, Mureș =

Vânători
- Commune
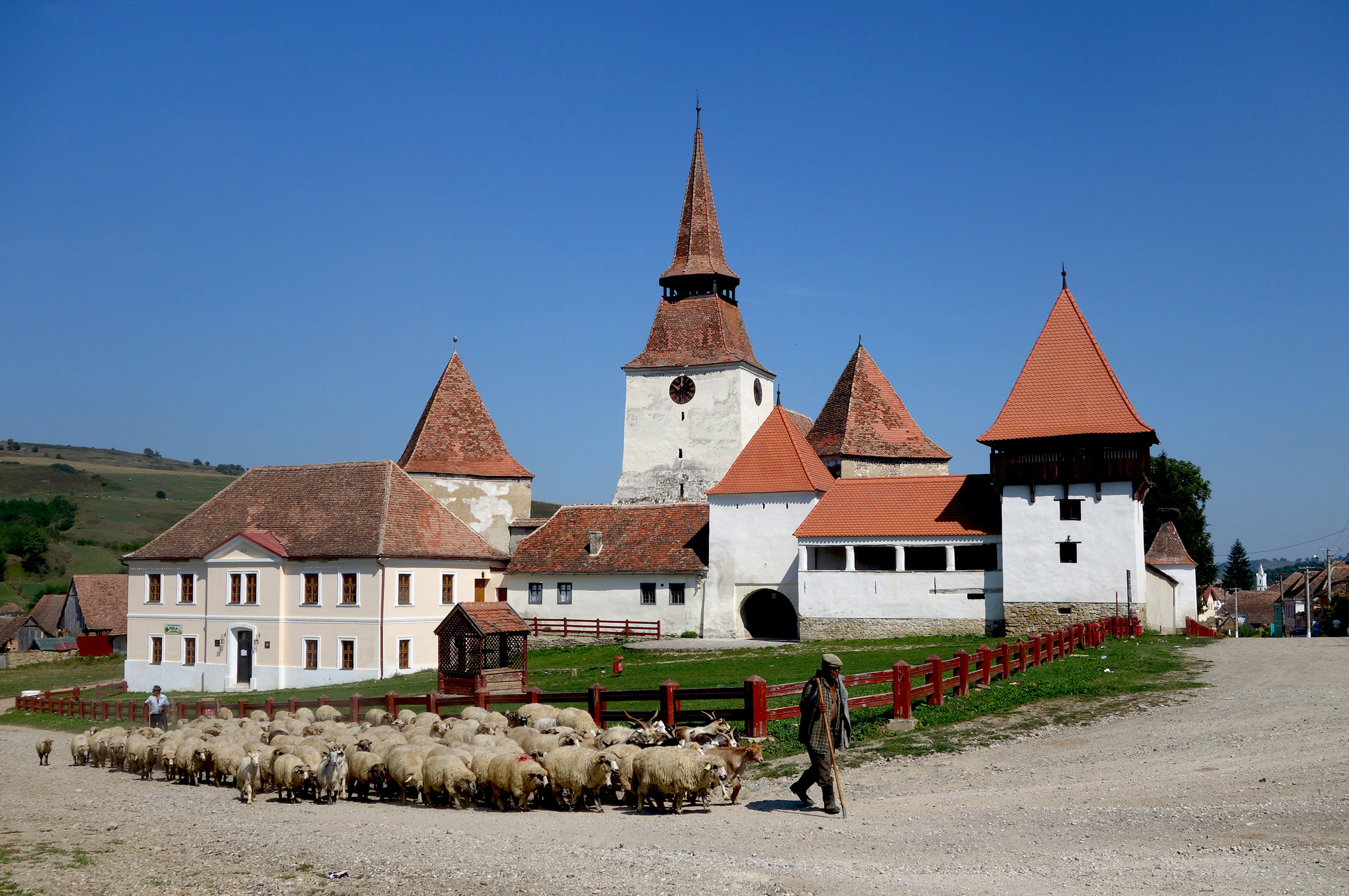
- Archita fortified church

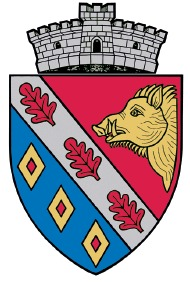
- Coat of arms

- Location in Mureș County

- Location in Romania
- Coordinates: 46°14′30″N 24°55′33″E
- Country: Romania
- County: Mureș

Government
  - Mayor (2024–2028): Mircea Augustin Felegean (PNL)
- Area: 111.73 km^{2} (43.14 sq mi)
- Elevation: 377 m (1,237 ft)
- Highest elevation: 839 m (2,753 ft)
- Population (2021-12-01): 4,131
  - Density: 36.97/km^{2} (95.76/sq mi)
- Time zone: UTC+02:00 (EET)
  - Summer (DST): UTC+03:00 (EEST)
- Postal code: 547635
- Area code: (+40) 0265
- Vehicle reg.: MS
- Website: www.comunavinatori.ro

Vânători (Hungarian: Héjjasfalva, Hungarian pronunciation: [ˈheːjːɒʃfɒlvɒ]; German: Teufelsdorf) is a commune in Mureș County, Transylvania, Romania. It is composed of five villages: Archita (Erked; Arkeden), Feleag (Magyarfelek; Altflaigen), Mureni (Szederjes; Neuflaigen), Șoard (Küküllősárd; Schard), and Vânători.

The route of the Via Transilvanica long-distance trail passes through the village of Archita.

At the 2002 census, the commune had a population of 3,760: 47% Romanians, 26% Hungarians, 26% Roma, and 1% others. At the 2021 census, Vânători had a population of 4,131; of those, 41.37% were Roma, 36.67% Romanians, 15.69% Hungarians, and 6.2% others.
