= List of settlements in Sibiu County =

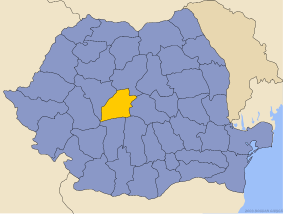
Sibiu County in Romania

This is a list of settlements in Sibiu County, Romania.

The following are the county's cities and towns, along with their attached villages:

| City/Town | Villages |
|---|---|
| Sibiu | Păltiniș |
| Mediaș | Ighișu Nou |
| Agnita | Coveș, Ruja |
| Avrig | Bradu, Glâmboaca, Mârșa, Săcădate |
| Cisnădie | Cisnădioara |
| Copșa Mică | |
| Dumbrăveni | Ernea, Șaroș pe Târnave |
| Miercurea Sibiului | Apoldu de Sus, Dobârca |
| Ocna Sibiului | Topârcea |
| Săliște | Aciliu, Amnaș, Crinț, Fântânele, Galeș, Mag, Săcel, Sibiel, Vale |
| Tălmaciu | Colonia Tălmaciu, Tălmăcel |

The following are the county's communes, with component villages:

| Commune | Villages |
|---|---|
| Alma | Alma, Giacăș, Șmig |
| Alțâna | Alțâna, Benești, Ghijasa de Sus |
| Apoldu de Jos | Apoldu de Jos, Sângătin |
| Arpașu de Jos | Arpașu de Jos, Arpașu de Sus, Nou Român |
| Ațel | Ațel, Dupuș |
| Axente Sever | Axente Sever, Agârbiciu, Șoala |
| Bazna | Bazna, Boian, Velț |
| Bârghiș | Bârghiș, Apoș, Ighișu Vechi, Pelișor, Vecerd, Zlagna |
| Biertan | Biertan, Copșa Mare, Richiș |
| Blăjel | Blăjel, Păucea, Romanești |
| Boița | Boița, Lazaret, Lotrioara, Paltin |
| Brateiu | Brateiu, Buzd |
| Brădeni | Brădeni, Retiș, Țeline |
| Bruiu | Bruiu, Gherdeal, Șomartin |
| Chirpăr | Chirpăr, Săsăuș, Vărd, Veseud |
| Cârța | Cârța, Poienița |
| Cârțișoara | Cârțișoara |
| Cristian | Cristian |
| Dârlos | Dârlos, Curciu, Valea Lungă |
| Gura Râului | Gura Râului |
| Hoghilag | Hoghilag, Prod, Valchid |
| Iacobeni | Iacobeni, Movile, Netuș, Noiștat, Stejărișu |
| Jina | Jina |
| Laslea | Laslea, Florești, Mălâncrav, Nou Săsesc, Roandola |
| Loamneș | Loamneș, Alămor, Armeni, Hașag, Mândra, Sădinca |
| Ludoș | Ludoș, Gusu |
| Marpod | Marpod, Ilimbav |
| Merghindeal | Merghindeal, Dealu Frumos |
| Micăsasa | Micăsasa, Chesler, Țapu, Văleni |
| Mihăileni | Mihăileni, Metiș, Moardăș, Răvășel, Șalcău |
| Moșna | Moșna, Alma Vii, Nemșa |
| Nocrich | Nocrich, Fofeldea, Ghijasa de Jos, Hosman, Țichindeal |
| Orlat | Orlat |
| Păuca | Păuca, Bogatu Român, Broșteni, Presaca |
| Poiana Sibiului | Poiana Sibiului |
| Poplaca | Poplaca |
| Porumbacu de Jos | Colun, Porumbacu de Jos, Porumbacu de Sus, Sărata, Scoreiu |
| Racovița | Racovița, Sebeșu de Sus |
| Rășinari | Rășinari, Prislop |
| Râu Sadului | Râu Sadului |
| Roșia | Roșia, Cașolț, Cornățel, Daia, Nou, Nucet |
| Sadu | Sadu |
| Slimnic | Slimnic, Albi, Pădureni, Ruși, Veseud |
| Șeica Mare | Șeica Mare, Boarta, Buia, Mighindoala, Petiș, Ștenea |
| Șeica Mică | Șeica Mică, Soroștin |
| Șelimbăr | Bungard, Mohu, Șelimbăr, Veștem |
| Șura Mare | Șura Mare, Hamba |
| Șura Mică | Șura Mică, Rusciori |
| Târnava | Târnava, Colonia Târnava |
| Tilișca | Tilișca, Rod |
| Turnu Roșu | Turnu Roșu, Sebeșu de Jos |
| Valea Viilor | Valea Viilor, Motiș |
| Vurpăr | Vurpăr |
