= Sădurel =

- Location within Romania

Location
- Country: Romania
- Counties: Sibiu County

Physical characteristics
- Source: Lotru Mountains
- Mouth: Sadu
  - coordinates: 45°36′06″N 24°00′17″E
  - elevation: 770 m (2,530 ft)
- Length: 14 km (8.7 mi)
- Basin size: 57 km^{2} (22 sq mi)

Basin features
- Progression: Sadu→ Cibin→ Olt→ Danube→ Black Sea
- Tributaries
  - right: Izvorul Vacii, Tarnița, Valea Țiganului, Valea Porcului

The Sădurel is a right tributary of the river Sadu in Romania. It discharges into the Sadu near Râu Sadului. Its length is 14 km (8.7 mi) and its basin size is 57 km^{2} (22 sq mi). It starts on the northern slope of Negovanu Mare peak, Lotru Mountains.
