= Sadu (Cibin) =

- Sadu drainage basin

- Location within Romania

Location
- Country: Romania
- Counties: Sibiu County
- Villages: Râu Sadului, Sadu, Tălmaciu

Physical characteristics
- Source: Cindrel Mountains
- Mouth: Cibin
  - location: Tălmaciu
  - coordinates: 45.6599°N 24.2666°E
- Length: 60 km (37 mi)
- Basin size: 278 km^{2} (107 sq mi)
- Discharge
  - location: *
  - average: 3.74 m^{3}/s (132 cu ft/s)

Basin features
- Progression: Cibin→ Olt→ Danube→ Black Sea
- Tributaries
  - right: Sădurel

The Sadu (Hungarian: Cód) is a right tributary of the river Cibin in Romania. It discharges into the Cibin in Tălmaciu. The Negovanu and Sadu II dams are located on the Sadu. Its length is 60 km (37 mi) and its basin size is 278 km^{2} (107 sq mi).

== Tributaries ==
The following rivers are tributaries to the river Sadu (from source to mouth):

- Left: Cânaia, Șerbănei, Rozdești, Dușa, Beșineu, Bătrâna, Valea Groșilor, Valea Cândii, Sașa, Valea Vârjoghii, Valea Bonții, Ciupari, Valea Hotarelor, Cârligele, Pârâul Rece, Valea Casei
- Right: Conțu, Negovanu, Valea Pitarului, Valea Doamnei, Sădurel, Valea lui Ivan, Drăgăneasa, Valea lui Roman, Puntea, Mancu, Prejba, Obrești, Lacul, Valea Plaiului, Juvertul, Mesteacănu, Varul, Priboiu
