= Proștea =

Proștea may refer to one of two places in Sibiu County, Romania:

- Proștea, the former name of Stejărișu village, Iacobeni Commune
- Proștea Mare, the former name of Târnava Commune
