= Mărginimea Sibiului =

Area comprising 18 Romanian localities in Sibiu County

- Cultural area in Romania
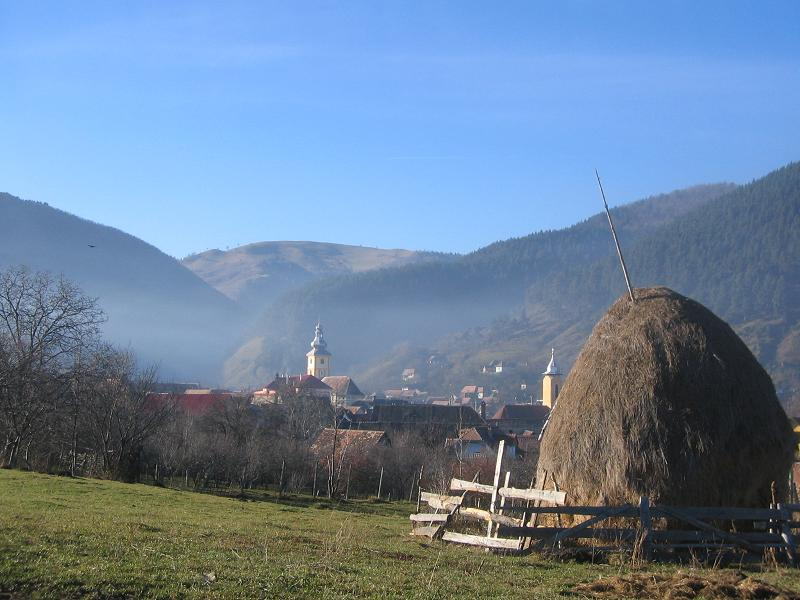
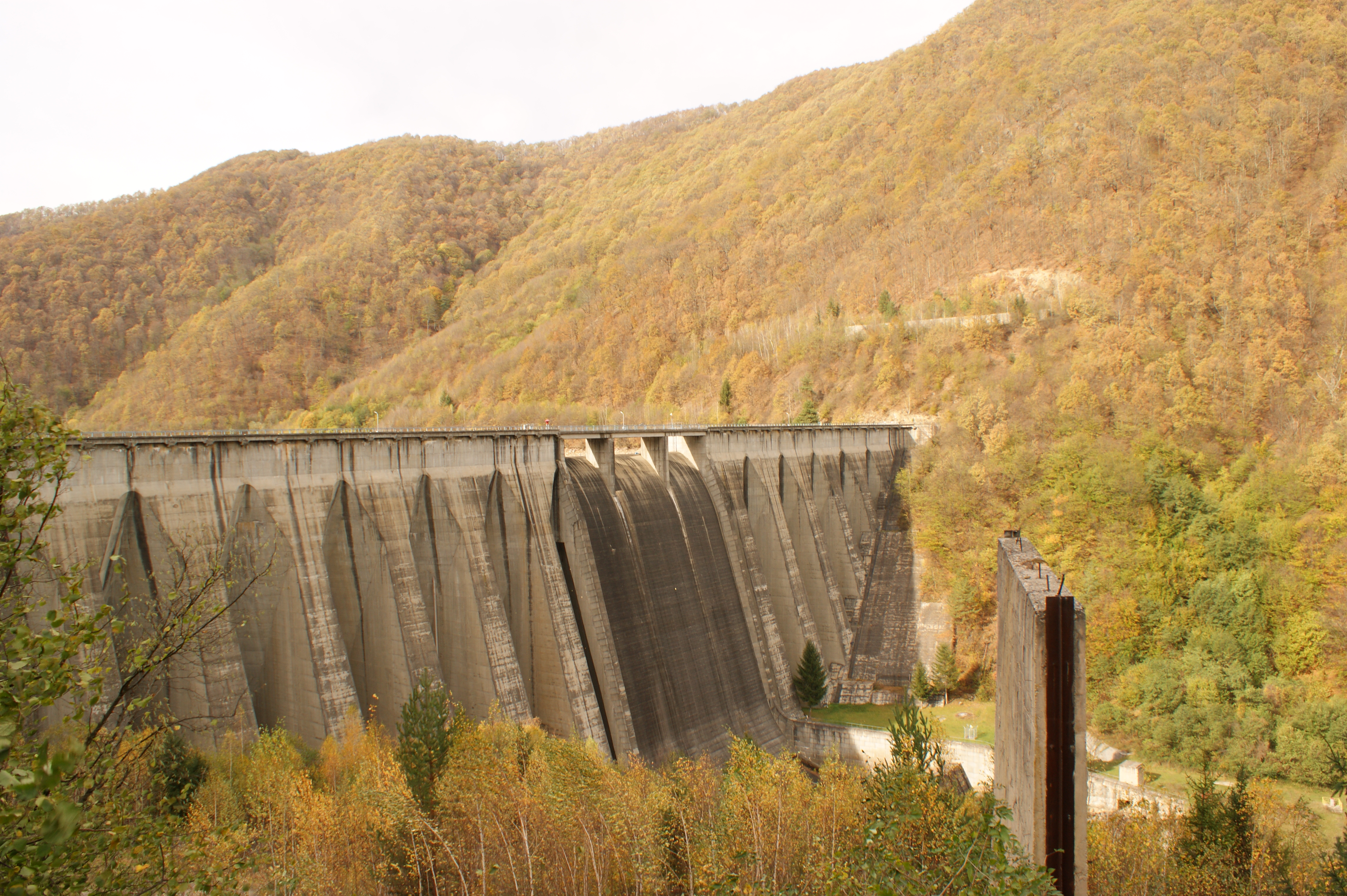
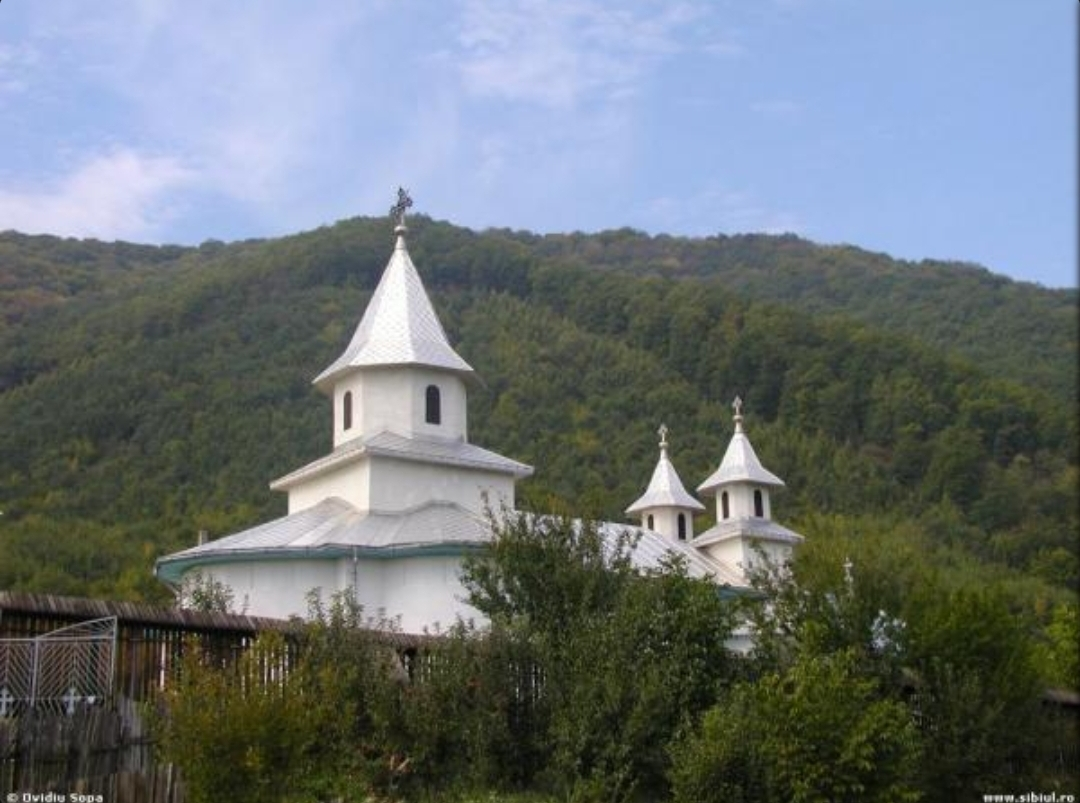
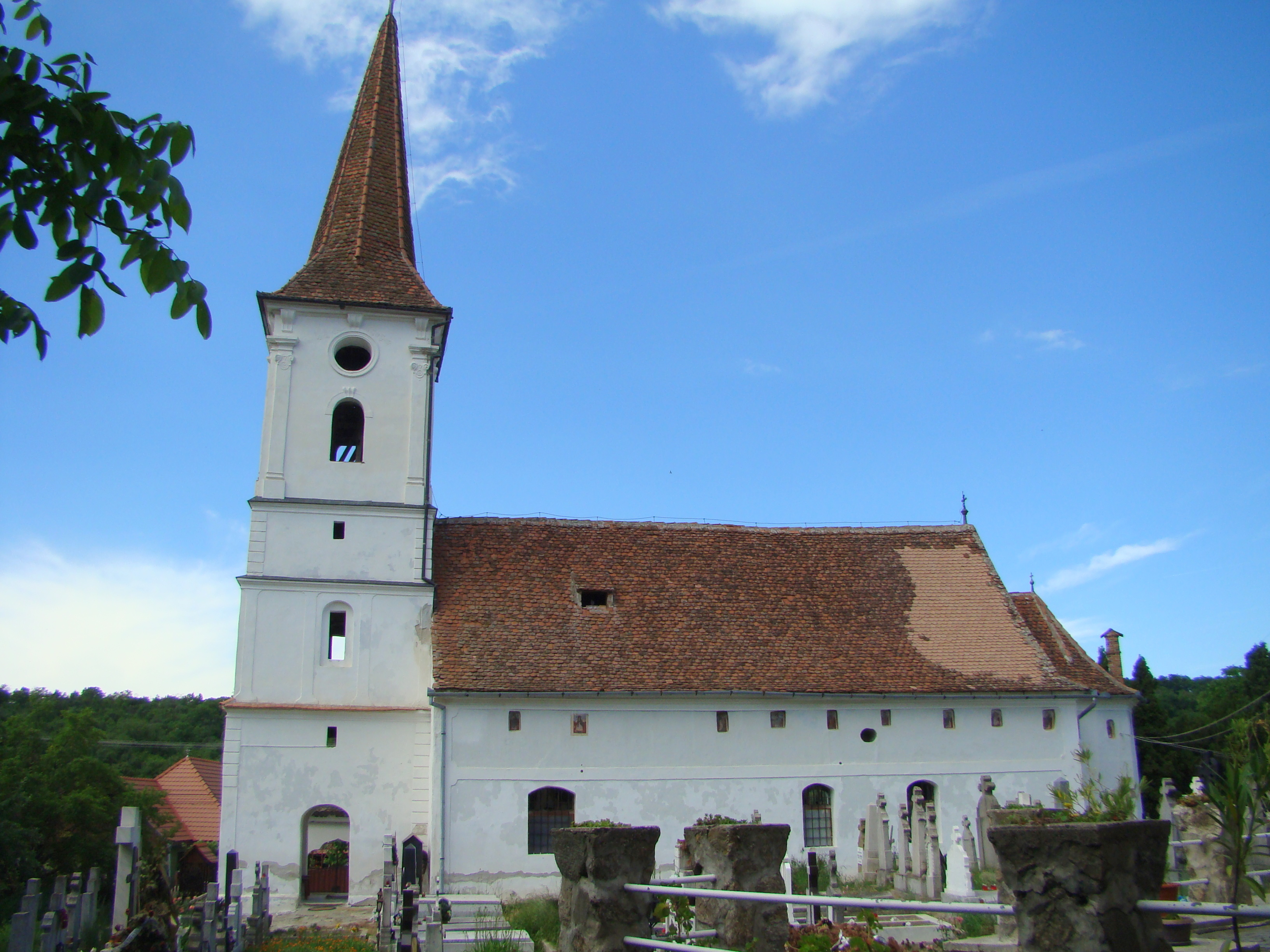
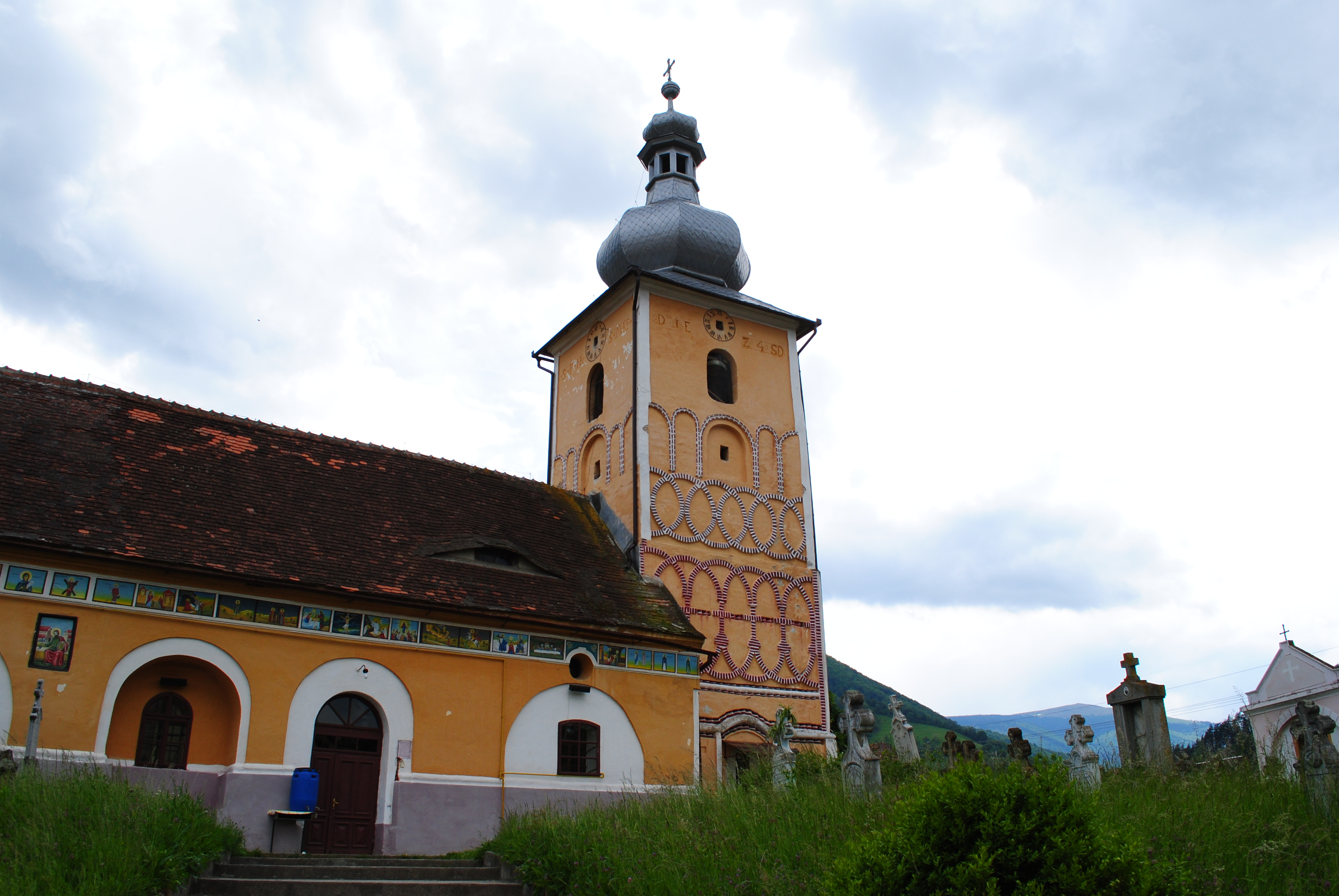
- View of Rășinari Gura Râului Dam Orlat Monastery Sibiel Orthodox Church Church of the Assumption of Mary in Sadu

- Mărginimea Sibiului (red) within Sibiu County
- Country: Romania

Mărginimea Sibiului (German: Hermannstädter Randgebiet; Hungarian: Szeben-Hegyalja) is an area which comprises 18 Romanian localities in the south-western part of Sibiu County, in southern Transylvania, all of them having a unique ethnological, cultural, architectural, and historical heritage.

== Position ==
The area is situated in the immediate vicinity of the cradle of Saxon Civilisation in Transylvania – the city of Sibiu, and has an area of over 200 km^{2} (77 sq mi) limited by the river Sadu in the south and the Săliște in the north. The villages are situated around the valleys of different rivers which flow from the Cindrel Mountains through the Transylvanian Plateau.

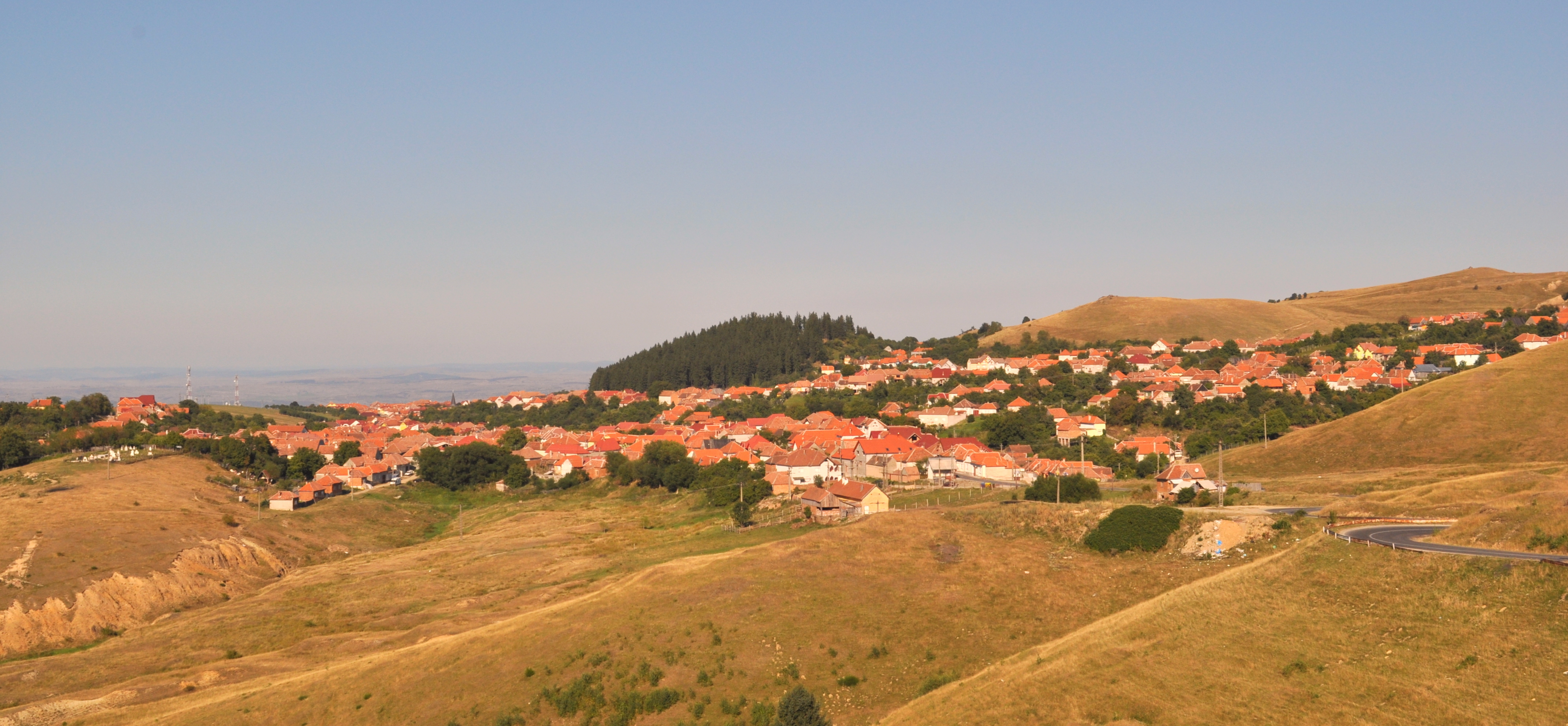
Poiana Sibiului panorama

The region comprises the following villages and towns:

- Boița
- Fântânele
- Galeș
- Gura Râului
- Jina
- Orlat
- Poiana Sibiului
- Poplaca
- Rășinari
- Râu Sadului
- Rod
- Sadu
- Săliște (town)
- Sibiel
- Tălmaciu (town)
- Tălmăcel
- Tilișca
- Vale

== Brief history ==
The oldest known settlement was a village called Ruetel dating to 1204, granted by King Emeric of Hungary to a certain John the Latin and his fellow heretics as per the charter recopied in June 2, 1469, which became Rășinari in 1488, followed by Tălmaciu (1318), Orlat (1322), and Săliște (1354). Throughout their history, some of these settlements were sometimes (along with the Țara Făgărașului) fiefs of the rulers of the Romanian principality of Wallachia. An important event in the area was the establishment in the 18th century by Maria Theresa of the 1st Romanian border regiment at Orlat. Also, Boița was a border village, at the end of the passageway along the Olt River.

== Occupations ==
Predominantly, the people were shepherds who continuously crossed the Carpathian Mountains, maintaining the essential link between the Romanian communities to the north and south of the mountains. Activities closely related to shepherding, such as wool and leather manufacturing, are still well maintained in the area to this day.

== Characteristics ==
The area has a rich variety of customs related to different times in the year and in life. To this day, it is a custom to wear the traditional folk costume – black and white, with a particular round shaped hat without borders worn by the men at the most important occasions. Painting on glass is a tradition in this area, strongly connected to the Romanian Orthodox Church which is by far the main religion of the inhabitants.

The architecture is strongly influenced by the Saxons, with big imposing houses, with an internal yard well closed on all sides. Wood was traditionally the main material used in construction, but bricks have replaced it in the last hundred years; today, only a small number of wooden houses can be found.

== Places to see ==
The church in Rășinari as of January 2005

The oldest church in the area can be found at Săliște; it is a painted church dating to 1674. Other old churches are the wooden church from Poiana Sibiului (1771) and the church from Tălmăcel (1776).

In Rășinari and Săliște there are some small village museums and also memorial houses. Emil Cioran is the best-known personality to have been born in this area. Additionally, Octavian Goga, a Romanian poet and a politician from the interwar period, along with more than six Romanian academicians, are natives of this area. There is a museum in Sibiel dedicated to glass-painted icons.

Close to Tilișca there can be found the remains of a Dacian citadel, situated on a hilltop with a panoramic view towards the Transylvanian Plateau.

A more modern museum can be found in Sadu, the place where the first electrical hydro-power plant was built in 1896 – the third one in Europe.
