= Tilișca =

- Commune
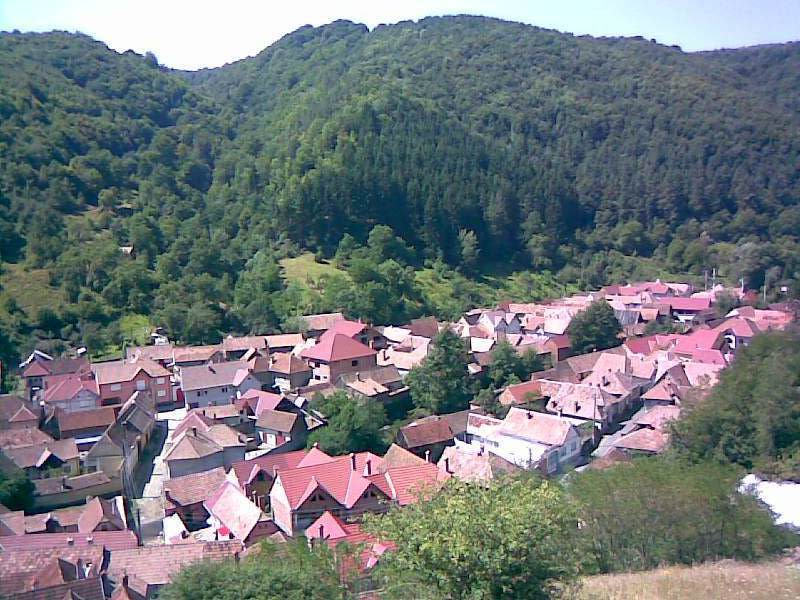
- Tilișca village

- Coat of arms

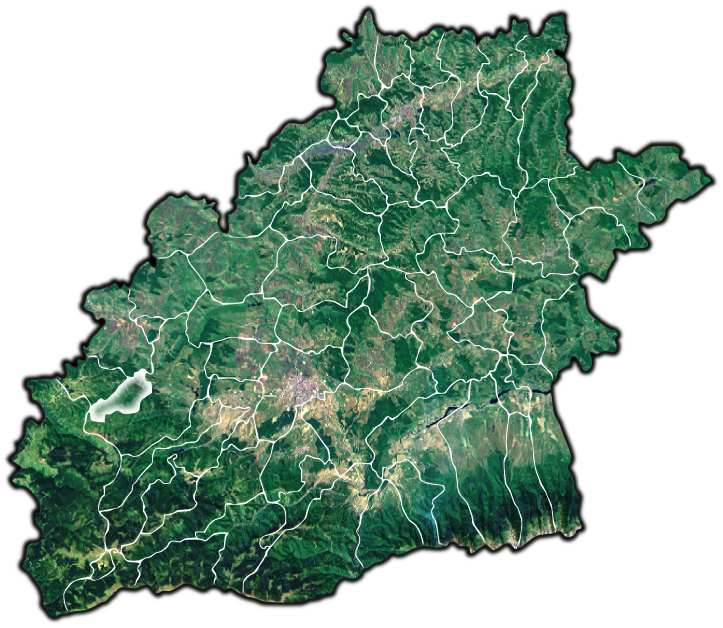
- Location in Sibiu County

- Location in Romania
- Coordinates: 45°47′57″N 23°50′40″E
- Country: Romania
- County: Sibiu

Government
  - Mayor (2020–2024): Vasile Cîmpean (PNL)
- Area: 52.77 km^{2} (20.37 sq mi)
- Elevation: 815 m (2,674 ft)
- Population (2021-12-01): 1,351
  - Density: 25.60/km^{2} (66.31/sq mi)
- Time zone: UTC+02:00 (EET)
  - Summer (DST): UTC+03:00 (EEST)
- Postal code: 557280
- Area code: +(40) 0269
- Vehicle reg.: SB
- Website: comunatilisca.ro

Tilișca (German: Tilischen; Hungarian: Tilicske) is a commune in Sibiu County, Transylvania, Romania, in the Cindrel Mountains, 26 km (16 mi) west of the county capital Sibiu, in the Mărginimea Sibiului ethnographic area. It is composed of two villages, Rod (Rod; Ród) and Tilișca.

== Natives ==
- Aaron Florian (1805–1887), historian, journalist, and revolutionary
- Andreea Iridon (born 1999), artistic gymnast
