= Jina, Sibiu =

Jina
- Commune
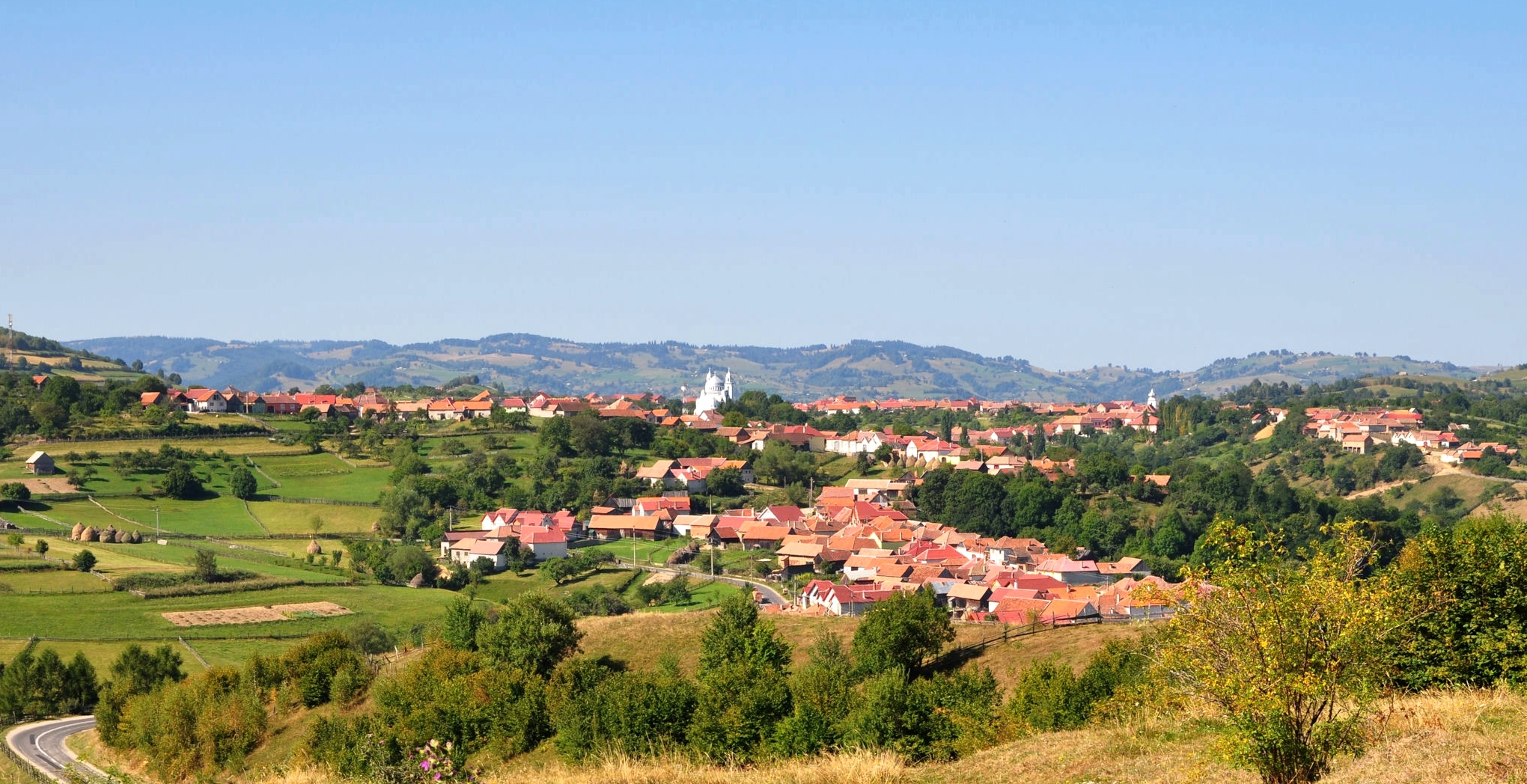

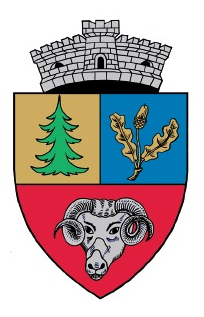
- Coat of arms

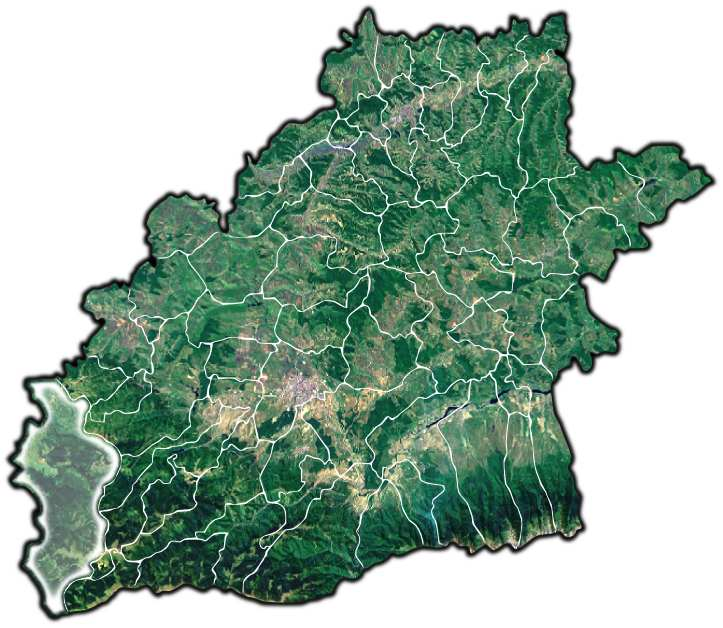
- Location in Sibiu County

- Location in Romania
- Coordinates: 45°47′4″N 23°40′55″E
- Country: Romania
- County: Sibiu

Government
  - Mayor (2020–2024): Georghe Vasile Beschiu (PNL)
- Area: 329.80 km^{2} (127.34 sq mi)
- Elevation: 908 m (2,979 ft)
- Highest elevation: 2,200 m (7,200 ft)
- Population (2021-12-01): 3,396
  - Density: 10.30/km^{2} (26.67/sq mi)
- Time zone: UTC+02:00 (EET)
  - Summer (DST): UTC+03:00 (EEST)
- Postal code: 557110
- Area code: +(40) 269
- Vehicle reg.: SB
- Website: comunajina.ro

Jina (German: Sinna; Hungarian: Zsinna) is a commune in Sibiu County, Transylvania, Romania, in the Cindrel Mountains, 44 km (27 mi) west of the county seat, Sibiu, in the Mărginimea Sibiului ethnographic area. It is composed of a single village, Jina.

The commune is located in the southwestern part of Sibiu County; it borders Alba County to the west and Vâlcea County to the south. Close by towns are Sebeș at 38 km (24 mi), Săliște at 24 km (15 mi), and Miercurea Sibiului at 20 km (12 mi). Jina is crossed by county road DJ106E, which branches off national road DN1 in Cristian and joins the Transalpina road (DN67C) in Șugag.

Historical population
Year	Pop.	±%
1850	1,846	—
1900	3,177	+72.1%
1941	4,211	+32.5%
1977	4,425	+5.1%
2002	4,073	−8.0%
2011	3,750	−7.9%
2021	3,396	−9.4%
Source: Census data
