= Poplaca =

- Commune
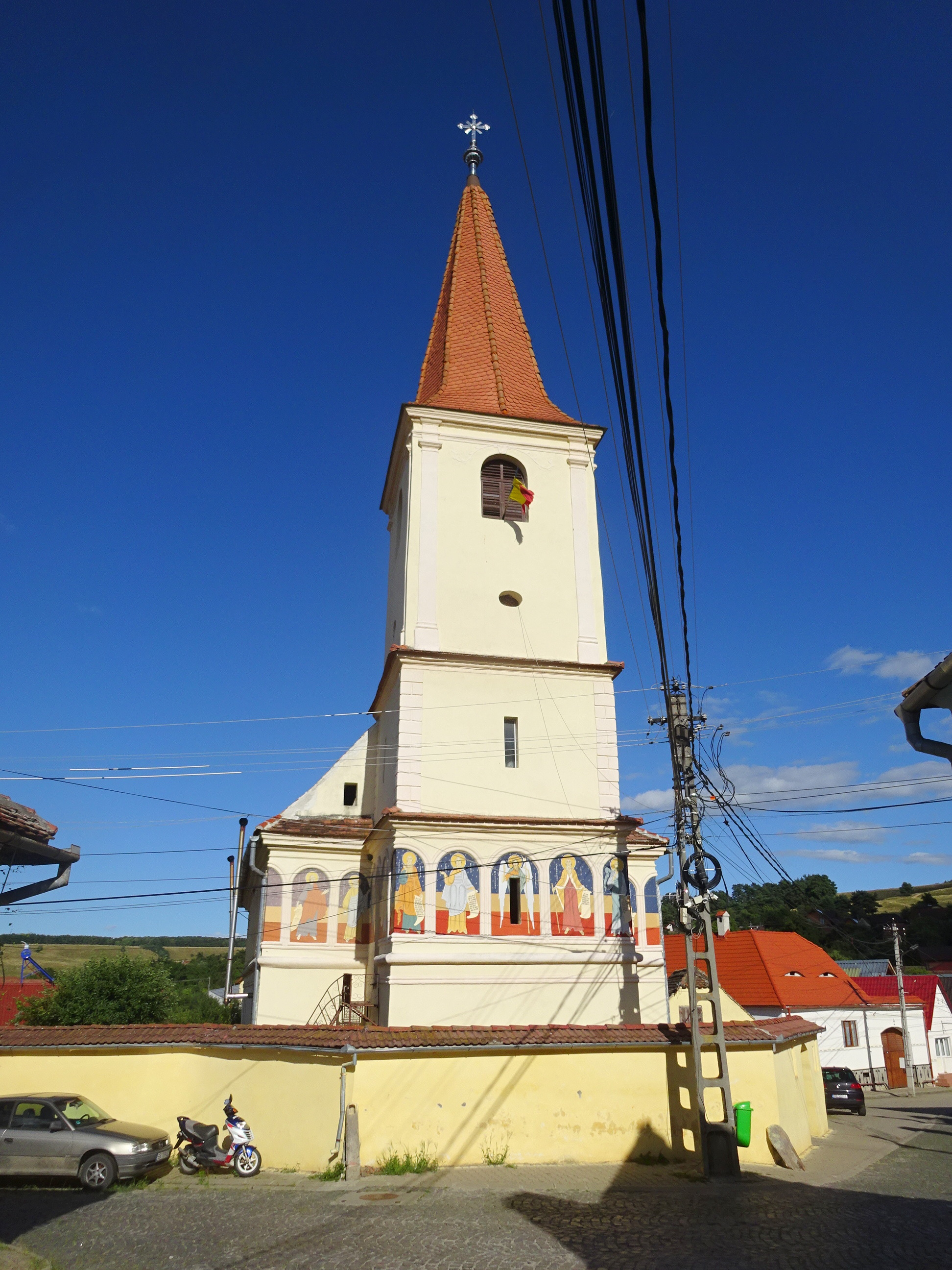
- Church of the Nativity of St John the Baptist

- Coat of arms

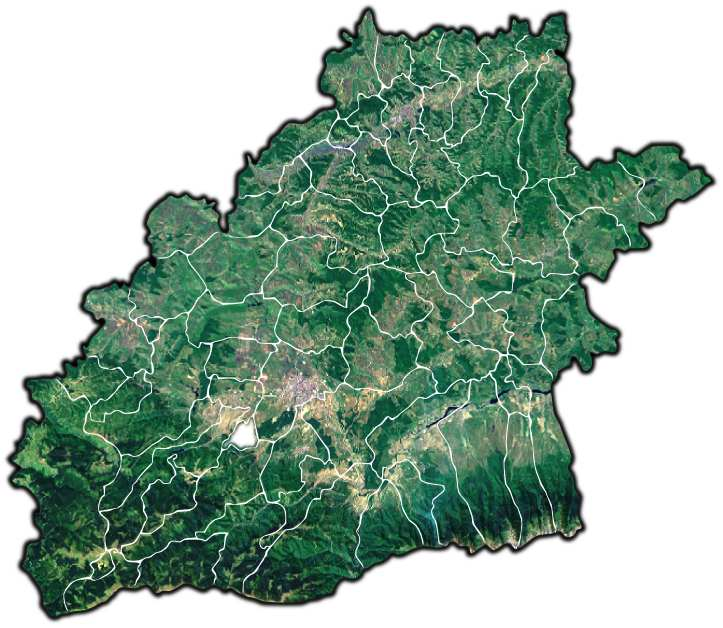
- Location in Sibiu County

- Location in Romania
- Coordinates: 45°43′37″N 24°3′11″E
- Country: Romania
- County: Sibiu

Government
  - Mayor (2020–2024): Vasile Budin (PSD)
- Area: 35.17 km^{2} (13.58 sq mi)
- Elevation: 515 m (1,690 ft)
- Population (2021-12-01): 1,782
  - Density: 50.67/km^{2} (131.2/sq mi)
- Time zone: UTC+02:00 (EET)
  - Summer (DST): UTC+03:00 (EEST)
- Postal code: 557185
- Area code: (+40) 02 69
- Vehicle reg.: SB
- Website: comunapoplaca.ro

Poplaca (German: Gunzendorf; Hungarian: Popláka) is a commune in Sibiu County, Transylvania, Romania, at the foothills of the Cindrel Mountains, 12 km (7.5 mi) south-west of the county capital Sibiu, in the Mărginimea Sibiului ethnographic area. It is composed of a single village, Poplaca.

The Păltiniș mountain resort is located less than 1 km (0.62 mi) from Poplaca.
