= Caput Stenarum (castra) =

Fort in the Roman province of Dacia

- Castra of Boița

- Location within Romania
- 45.63577°N 24.26601°E
- Location: În rude, Boița, Sibiu, Romania

History
- Founded: 2nd century AD
- Abandoned: 245

Site notes
- Elevation: 365 m (1,198 ft)
- Condition: Ruined

Caput Stenarum was a fort in the Roman province of Dacia in the 2nd century AD. It is located 700 m east of the village Boița in Romania at the northern exit of the Olt gorge.

It was part of the Roman frontier system of the Limes Alutanus along the Olt (river).

It is located 1 km away from the mouth of Turnu Roşu Pass and was of particular importance both for the defence of the border of the Province of Dacia Inferior and for the supervision of the pass in the Carpathians and the road that forks here.

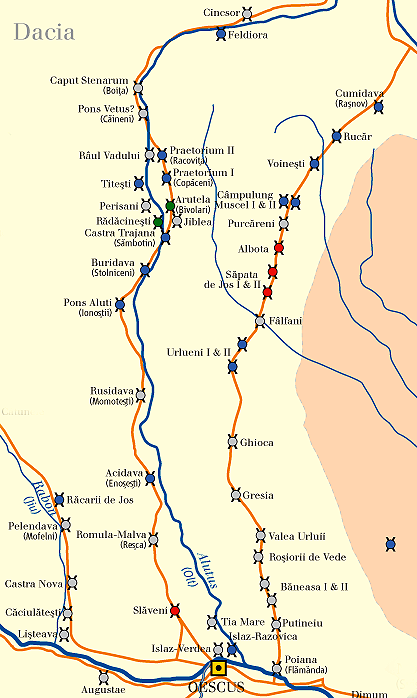
Forts on Limes Alutanus (to the left)

== See also ==
- List of castra
