= Boița =

- Commune
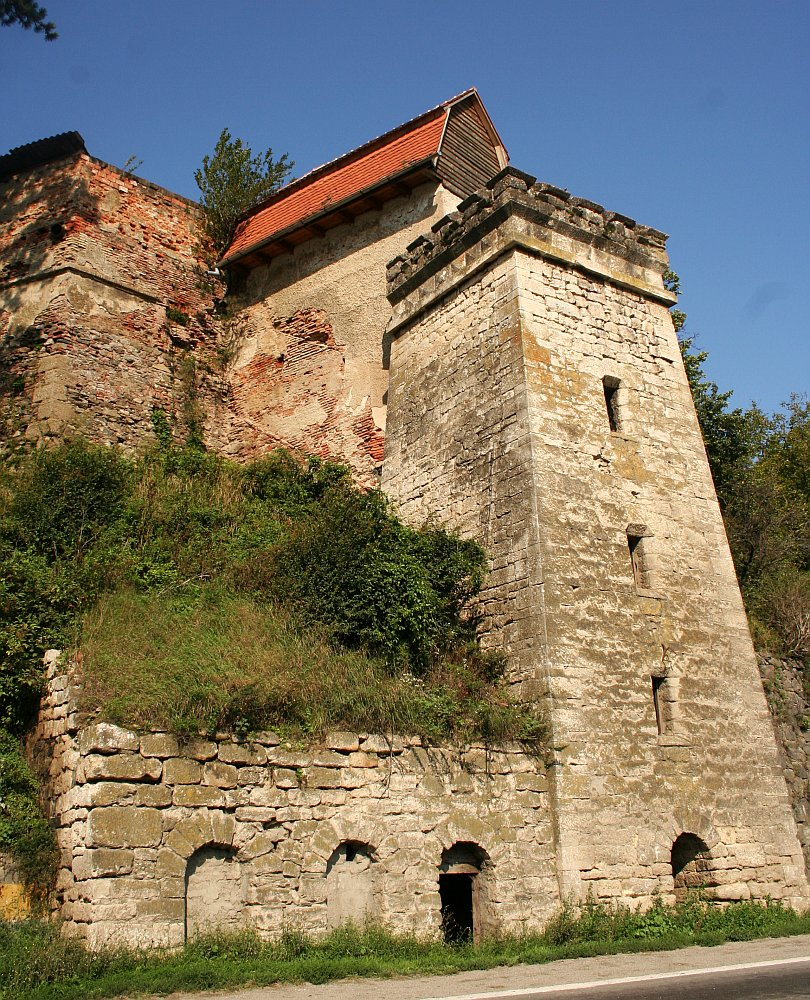
- The old customs tower in Boița

- Location in Sibiu County

- Location in Romania
- Coordinates: 45°37′59″N 24°15′27″E
- Country: Romania
- County: Sibiu

Government
  - Mayor (2024–2028): Nicolae Cocoș (PNL)
- Area: 100.37 km^{2} (38.75 sq mi)
- Highest elevation: 425 m (1,394 ft)
- Lowest elevation: 350 m (1,150 ft)
- Population (2021-12-01): 1,410
  - Density: 14.0/km^{2} (36.4/sq mi)
- Time zone: UTC+02:00 (EET)
  - Summer (DST): UTC+03:00 (EEST)
- Postal code: 555701
- Area code: +(40) 02 69
- Vehicle reg.: SB
- Website: boita.ro

Boița (German: Ochsendorf; Hungarian: Bojca; Latin: Caput Stenarum) is a commune in Sibiu County, Transylvania, Romania, at the foothills of the Cindrel Mountains, 22 km (14 mi) south of the county capital Sibiu, in the Mărginimea Sibiului ethnographic area, on the main road between Sibiu and the southern part of Romania, the National road 7/European route 81, at the entrance of the Olt River defile. The commune is composed of four villages: Boița, Lazaret, Lotrioara (Latorvár), and Paltin. These were part of Tălmaciu town until 2004, when they were split off.

In 1910 the village had 1,657 inhabitants. At the 2021 census, Boița had a population of 1,410; of those, 96.6% were ethnic Romanians.

== Climate ==
Climate data for Boița (altitude 518m, 2014–2026 normals, extremes 1981–present)
Month	Jan	Feb	Mar	Apr	May	Jun	Jul	Aug	Sep	Oct	Nov	Dec	Year
Record high °C (°F)	18.2 (64.8)	20.3 (68.5)	29.9 (85.8)	29.4 (84.9)	32.2 (90.0)	35.4 (95.7)	37.6 (99.7)	39.7 (103.5)	34.4 (93.9)	29.0 (84.2)	24.7 (76.5)	18.2 (64.8)	39.7 (103.5)
Mean daily maximum °C (°F)	3.6 (38.5)	7.3 (45.1)	12.0 (53.6)	16.8 (62.2)	20.7 (69.3)	25.9 (78.6)	27.4 (81.3)	27.9 (82.2)	23.0 (73.4)	16.8 (62.2)	10.1 (50.2)	5.0 (41.0)	16.4 (61.5)
Daily mean °C (°F)	−0.1 (31.8)	3.1 (37.6)	7.1 (44.8)	11.3 (52.3)	15.3 (59.5)	20.1 (68.2)	21.6 (70.9)	21.7 (71.1)	17.5 (63.5)	11.7 (53.1)	6.5 (43.7)	2.0 (35.6)	11.5 (52.7)
Mean daily minimum °C (°F)	−3.8 (25.2)	−1.0 (30.2)	2.1 (35.8)	5.7 (42.3)	9.9 (49.8)	14.2 (57.6)	15.7 (60.3)	15.6 (60.1)	11.9 (53.4)	6.6 (43.9)	2.9 (37.2)	−0.9 (30.4)	6.6 (43.8)
Record low °C (°F)	−26.2 (−15.2)	−20.5 (−4.9)	−19.3 (−2.7)	−3.7 (25.3)	−1.0 (30.2)	4.8 (40.6)	8.4 (47.1)	6.9 (44.4)	−0.3 (31.5)	−6.1 (21.0)	−17.1 (1.2)	−26.7 (−16.1)	−26.7 (−16.1)
Source: Meteomanz (2014-2026); Infoclimat (1980-2010)

== See also ==
- Caput Stenarum (castra)
