= Gura Râului =

- Commune
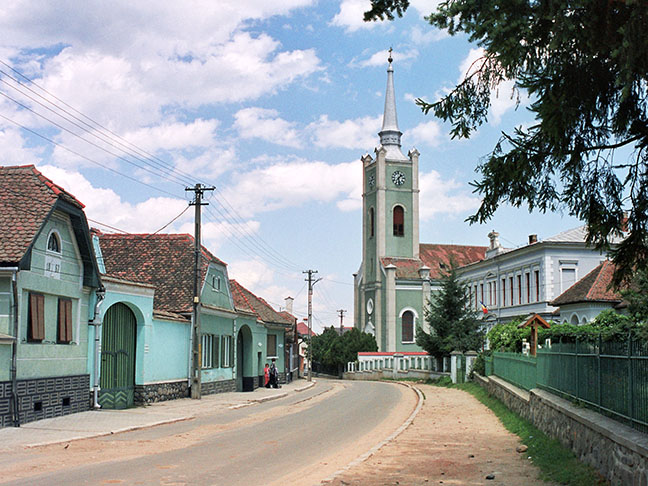
- Main street and Biserica Mare

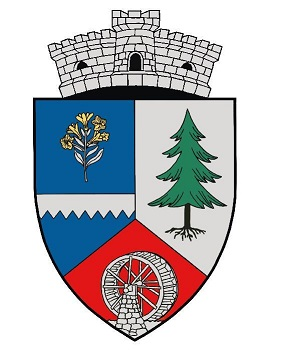
- Coat of arms

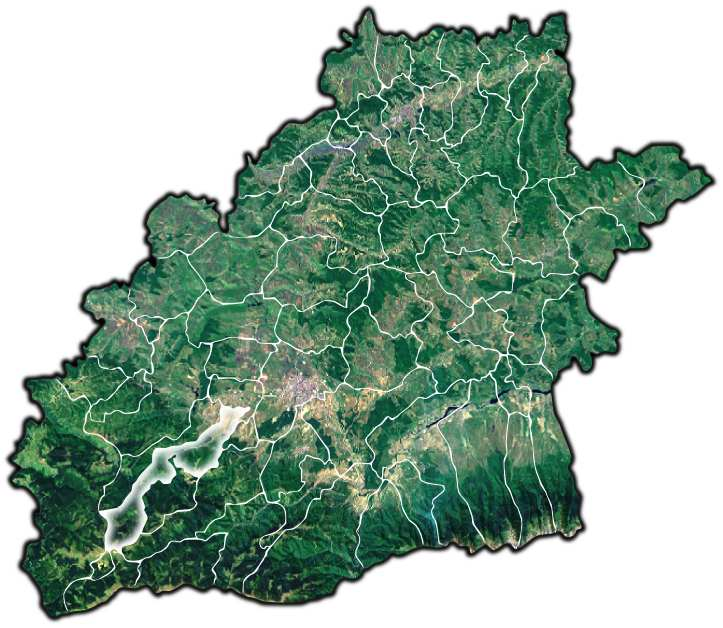
- Location in Sibiu County

- Location in Romania
- Coordinates: 45°43′39″N 23°58′19″E
- Country: Romania
- County: Sibiu

Government
  - Mayor (2020–2024): Gheorghe Călin (PNL)
- Area: 100 km^{2} (39 sq mi)
- Elevation: 530 m (1,740 ft)
- Population (2021-12-01): 3,522
  - Density: 35/km^{2} (91/sq mi)
- Time zone: UTC+02:00 (EET)
  - Summer (DST): UTC+03:00 (EEST)
- Postal code: 557095
- Area code: (+40) 02 69
- Vehicle reg.: SB
- Website: www.primariagurariului.ro

Gura Râului (German: Auendorf; Hungarian: Guraró) is a commune in Sibiu County, Transylvania, Romania. It lies at the foothills of the Cindrel Mountains, 20 km (12 mi) west of the county capital, Sibiu, within the Mărginimea Sibiului ethnographic area. It is composed of a single village, Gura Râului.
