= Poiana Sibiului =

- Commune
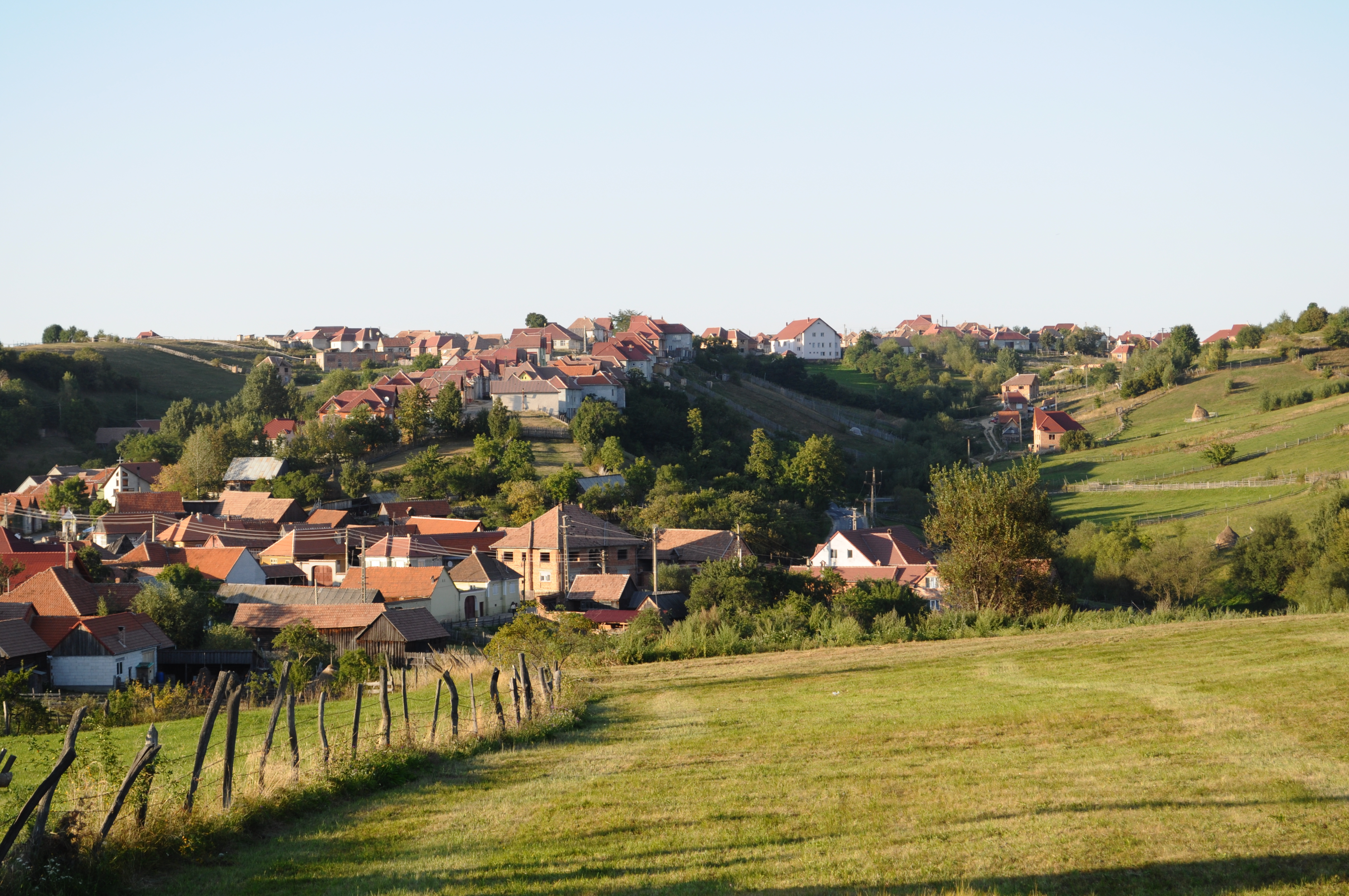

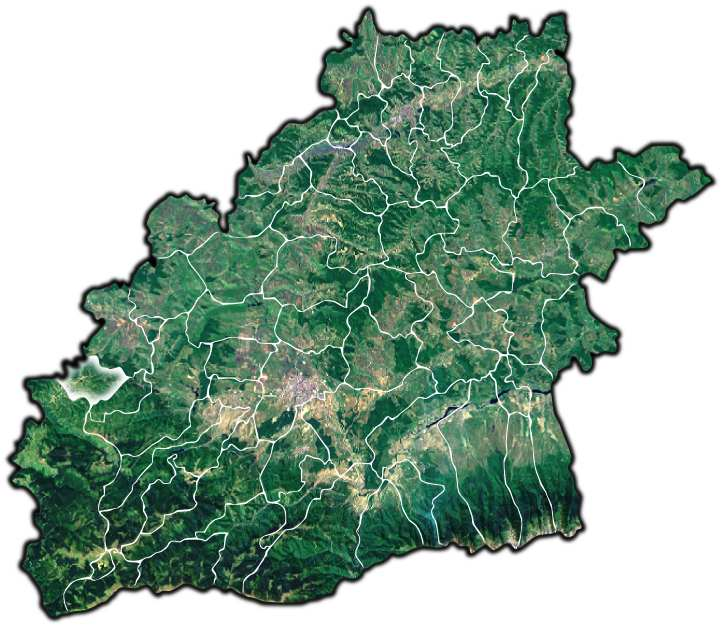
- Location in Sibiu County

- Location in Romania
- Coordinates: 45°48′20″N 23°43′49″E
- Country: Romania
- County: Sibiu
- Established: 1537

Government
  - Mayor (2020–2024): Adrian-Pavel Iovi (PSD)
- Area: 23.47 km^{2} (9.06 sq mi)
- Elevation: 853 m (2,799 ft)
- Population (2021-12-01): 2,346
  - Density: 99.96/km^{2} (258.9/sq mi)
- Time zone: UTC+02:00 (EET)
  - Summer (DST): UTC+03:00 (EEST)
- Postal code: 557180
- Area code: (+40) 02 69
- Vehicle reg.: SB
- Website: comunapoianasibiului.ro

Poiana Sibiului (German: Pojana; Hungarian: Polyán) is a commune in Sibiu County, Transylvania, Romania. It is composed of a single village, Poiana Sibiului. The name means "the glade of Sibiu".

== Position ==
The village is situated in the Cindrel Mountains at an altitude of about 900 m (3,000 ft), 35 km (22 mi) west of the county capital Sibiu, in the Mărginimea Sibiului ethnographic area.

== History ==
The first written account dates from 1537. Compared with the neighbouring villages, Poiana is a later settlement of Romanian population that moved higher in the mountains presumably dislocated by Saxon settlements. The occupation shifted from agriculture to sheep-herding, which remains even today the main occupation.
