= Râu Sadului =

- Commune
- Râu Sadului town hall

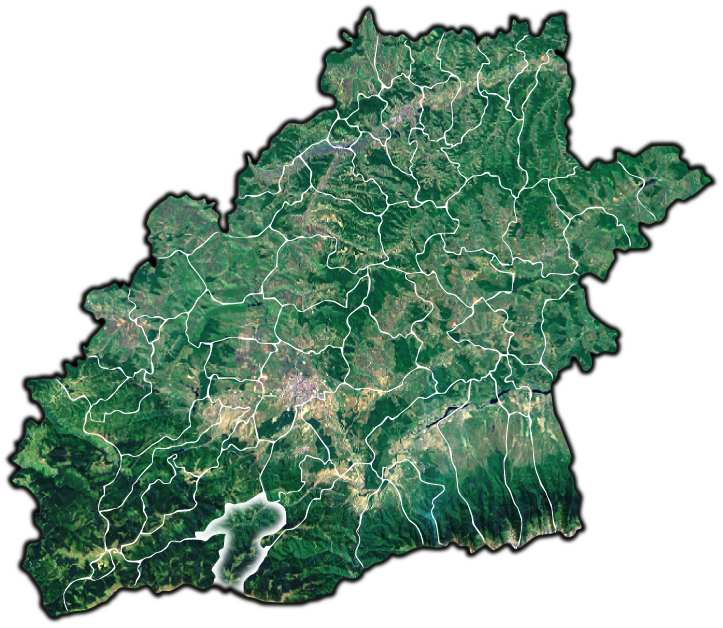
- Location in Sibiu County

- Location in Romania
- Coordinates: 45°37′N 24°4′E
- Country: Romania
- County: Sibiu

Government
  - Mayor (2024–2028): Daniel Dumitru Minea (PNL)
- Area: 52.21 km^{2} (20.16 sq mi)
- Elevation: 610 m (2,000 ft)
- Population (2021-12-01): 514
  - Density: 9.84/km^{2} (25.5/sq mi)
- Time zone: UTC+02:00 (EET)
  - Summer (DST): UTC+03:00 (EEST)
- Postal code: 557205
- Area code: +(40) 0269
- Vehicle reg.: SB
- Website: riusadului.ro

Râu Sadului (Hungarian: Riuszád) is a commune in Sibiu County, Transylvania, Romania, at the foothills of the Cindrel Mountains, 32 km (20 mi) south of the county capital Sibiu, in the Mărginimea Sibiului ethnographical area. It is composed of a single village, Râu Sadului.

The commune lies on the banks of the river Sadu, at an altitude of 610 m (2,000 ft). It is located in the southern part of the county, on the border with Vâlcea County.

At the 2011 census, the commune had 571 inhabitants, of which 96.85% were ethnic Romanians. At the 2021 census, the Râu Sadului had a population of 514; of those, 87.16% were Romanians.
