= Blăjel =

- Commune
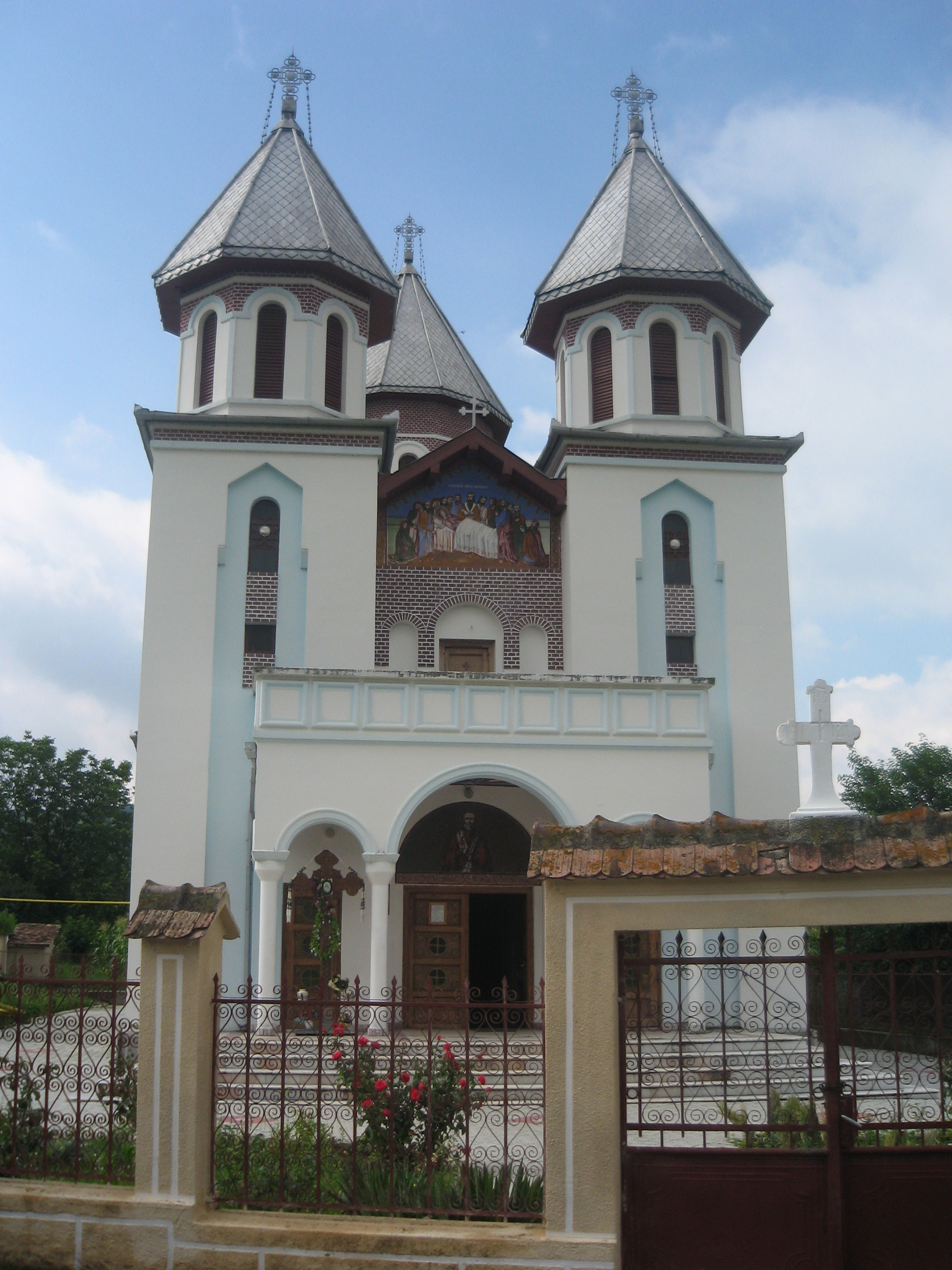
- Church in Blăjel

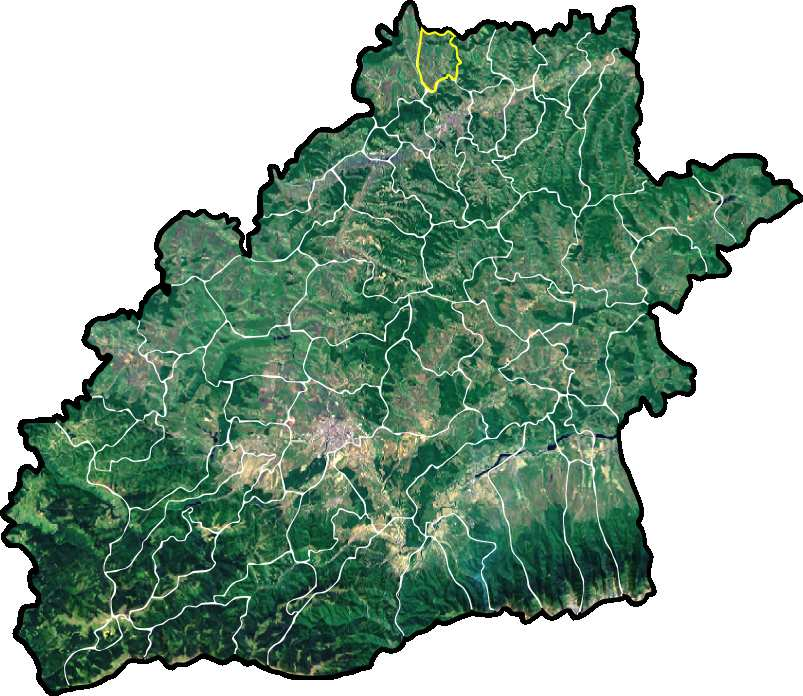
- Location in Sibiu County

- Location in Romania
- Coordinates: 46°13′N 24°19′E
- Country: Romania
- County: Sibiu

Government
  - Mayor (2024–2028): Marius Mărginean (PNL)
- Area: 34.02 km^{2} (13.14 sq mi)
- Elevation: 344 m (1,129 ft)
- Population (2021-12-01): 1,967
  - Density: 57.82/km^{2} (149.8/sq mi)
- Time zone: UTC+02:00 (EET)
  - Summer (DST): UTC+03:00 (EEST)
- Postal code: 557050
- Area code: +40 x59
- Vehicle reg.: SB
- Website: primariablajel.ro

Blăjel (German: Kleinblasendorf; Hungarian: Balázstelke) is a commune located in Sibiu County, Transylvania, Romania. It is composed of three villages: Blăjel, Păucea (Puschendorf; Pócstelke), and Romanești (Kalibák).

The commune is located in the northern part of the county, 65 km (40 mi) from the county seat, Sibiu. It sits on the Transylvanian Plateau, on the border with Mureș County and close to the border with Alba County. Its neighbors are: the city of Târnăveni to the north, the city of Mediaș to the south, Dârlos commune to the east, and Bazna commune to the west. Blăjel is traversed by national road DN14A, which runs from Mediaș to Târnăveni and on to Iernut.

At the 2011 census, the commune had 2,284 inhabitants; of those, 68.9% were Romanians, 18.1% Roma, 12.1% Hungarians, and 0.7% Germans. At the 2021 census, Blăjel had a population of 1,967; of those, 65.18% were Romanians, 16.12% Roma, and 8.74% Hungarians.
