= Sibiu County =

County of Romania

Sibiu County Județul Sibiu
- County
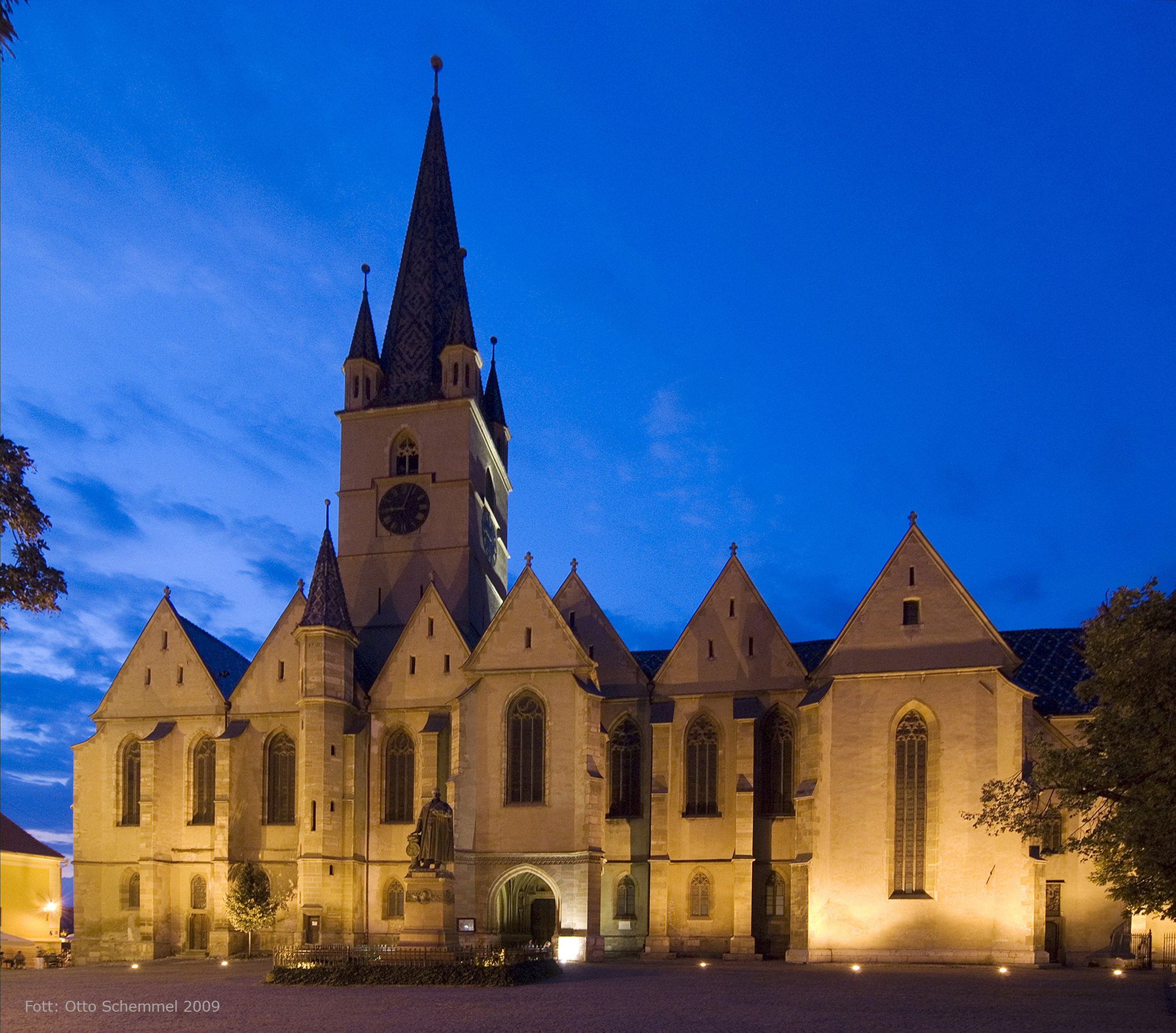
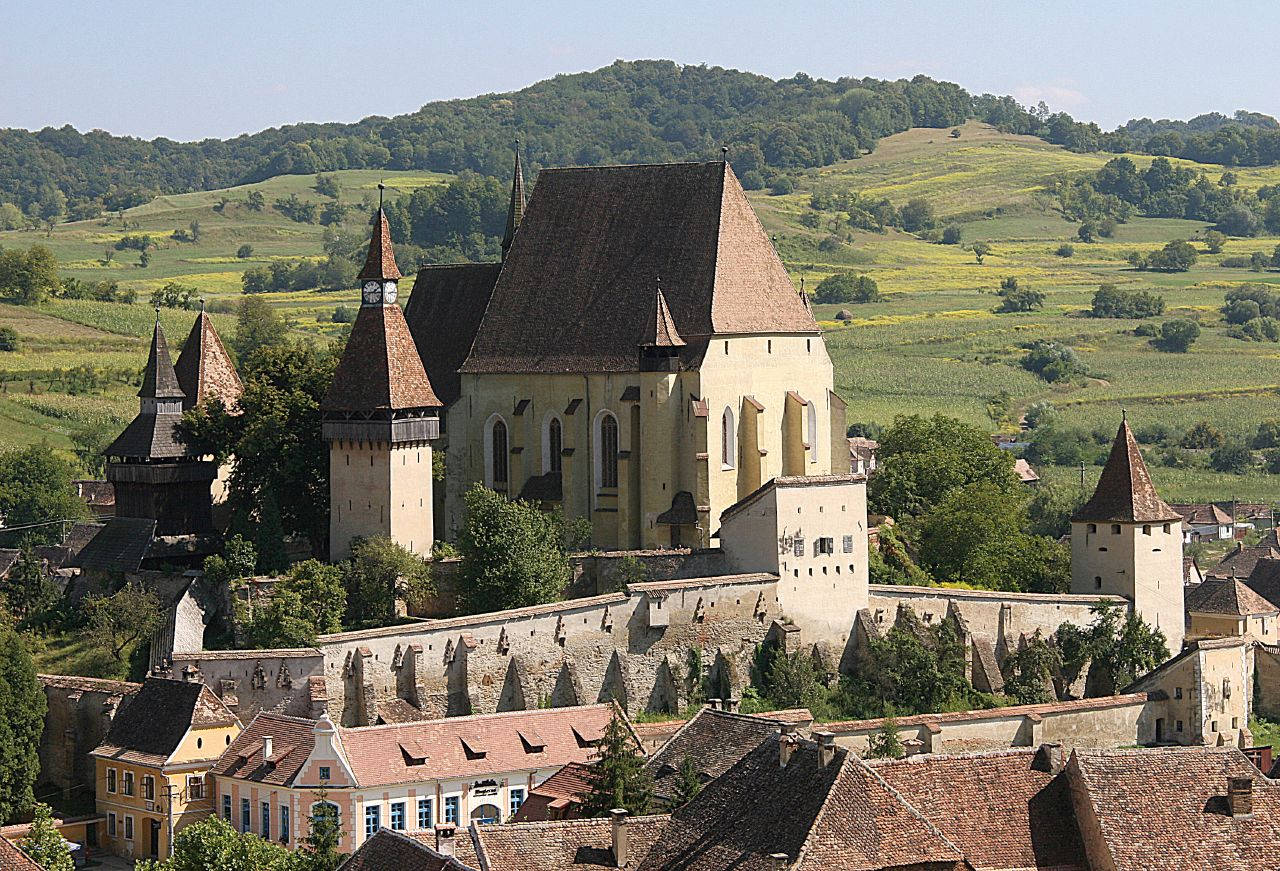
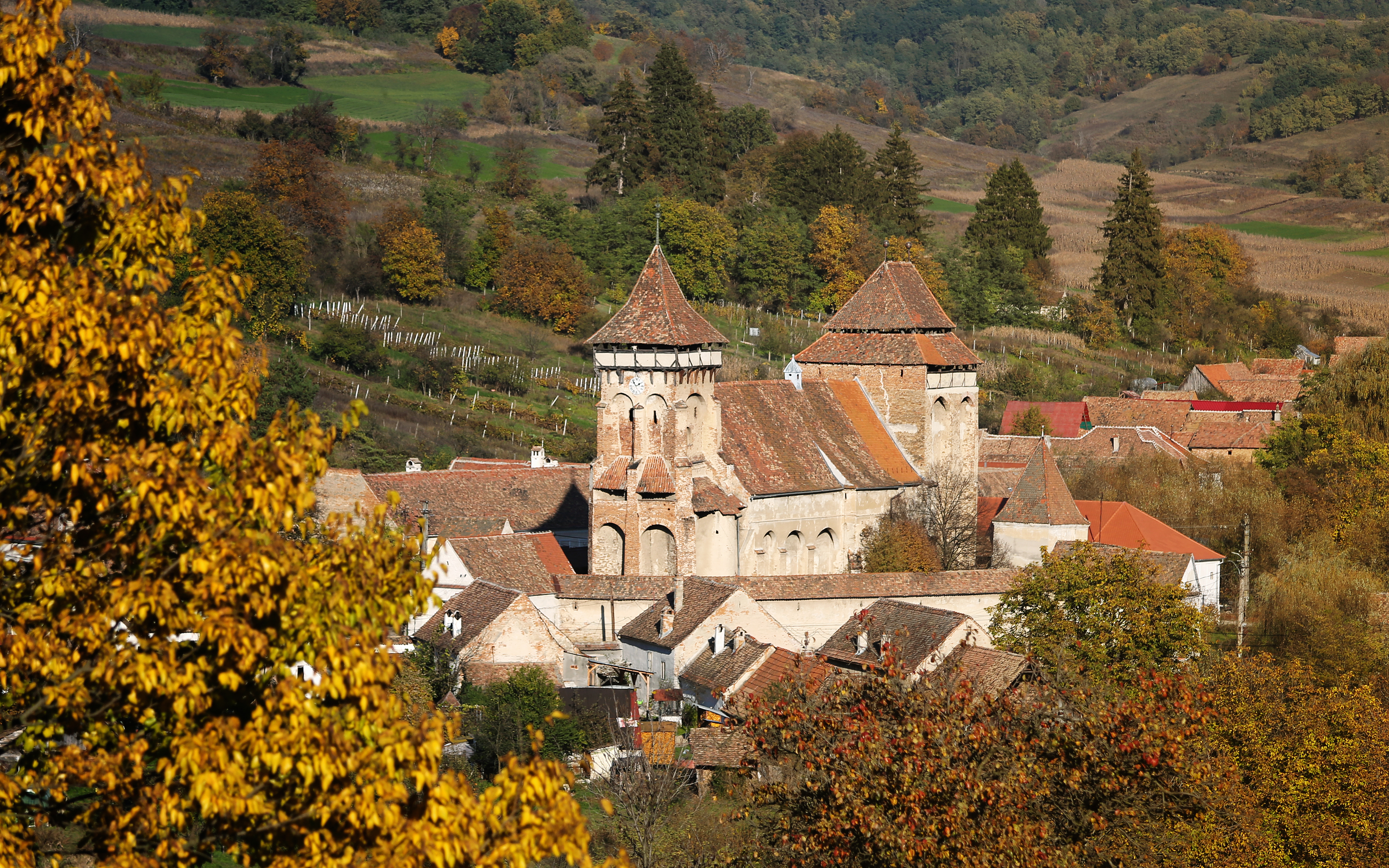
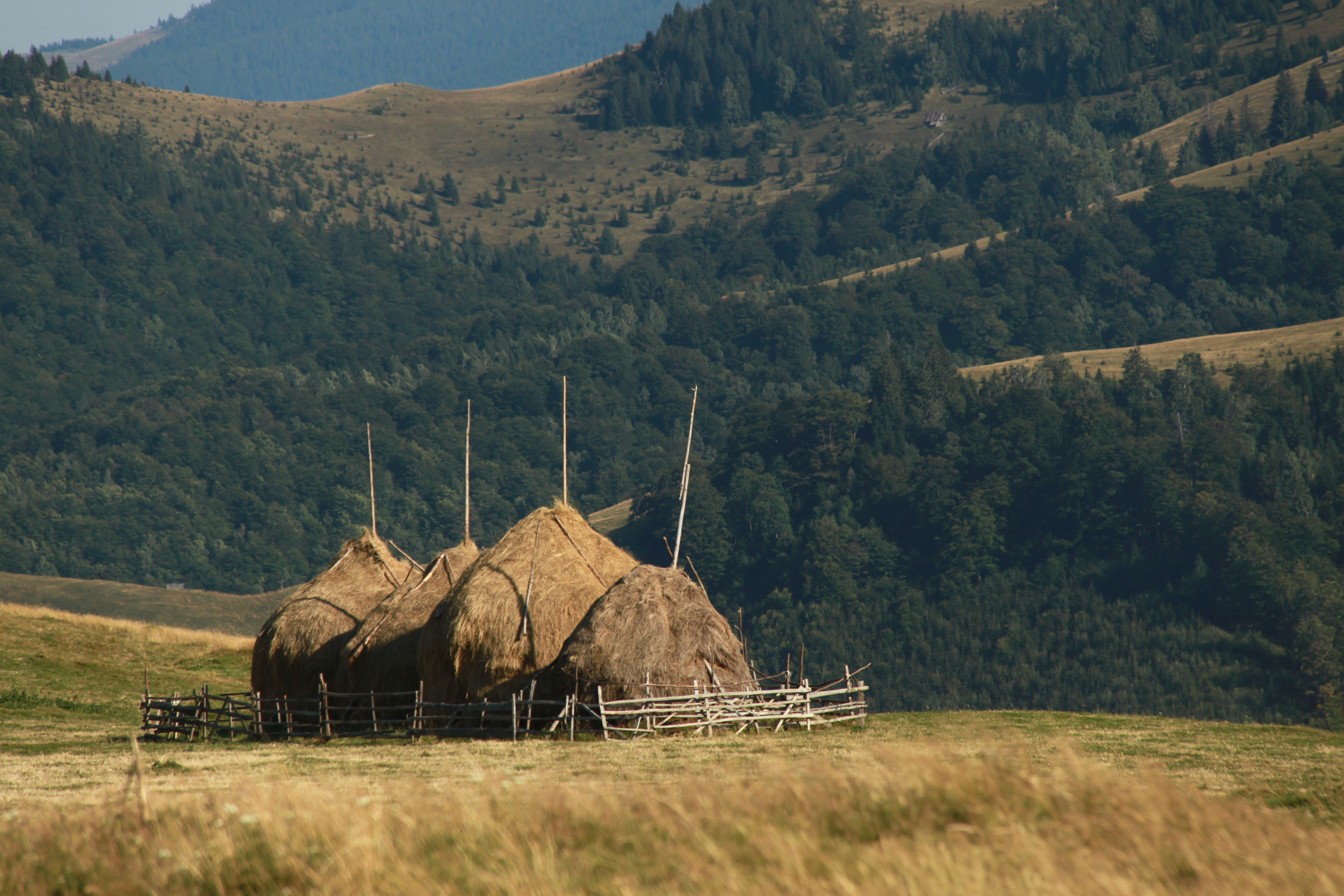
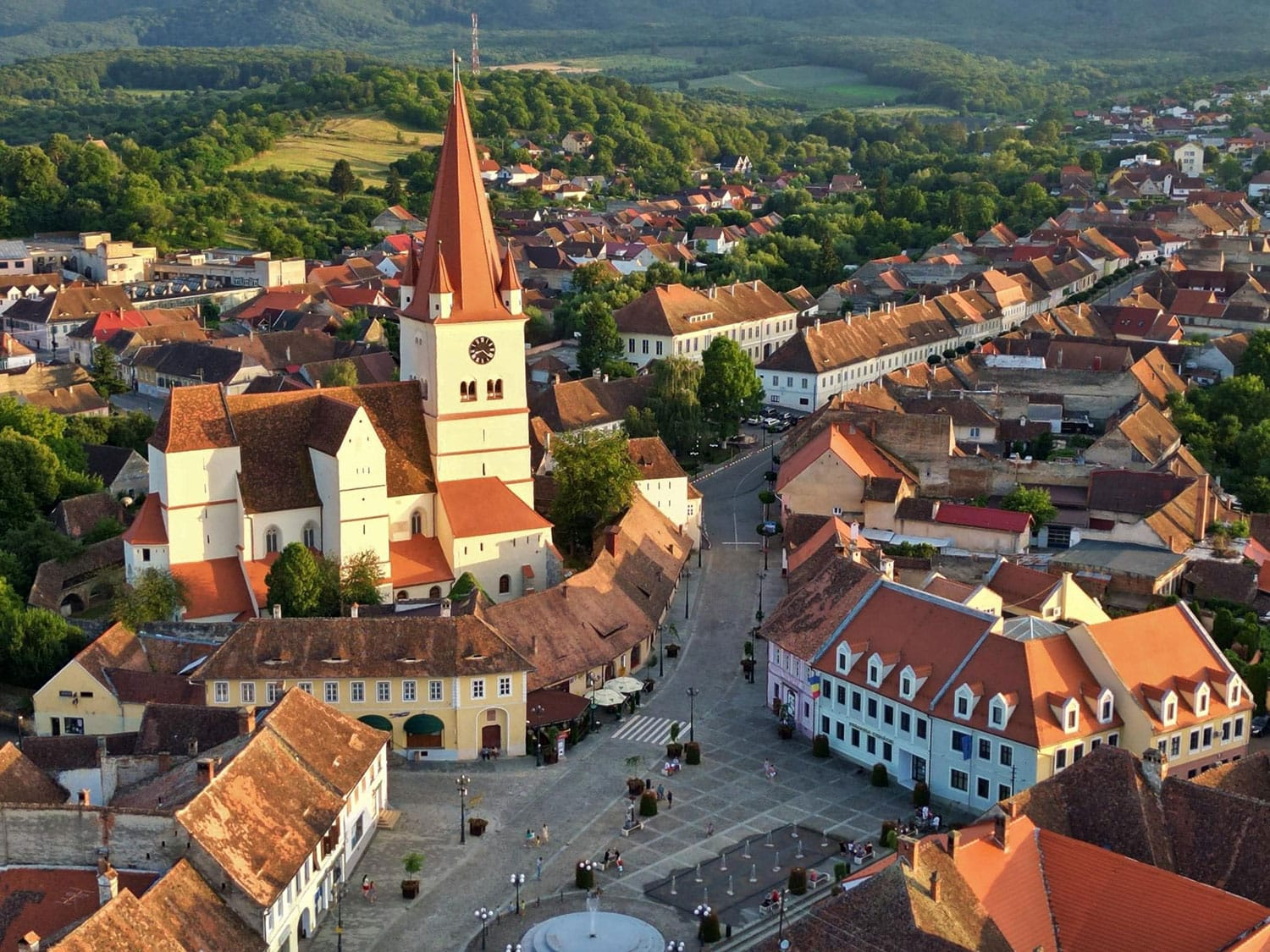
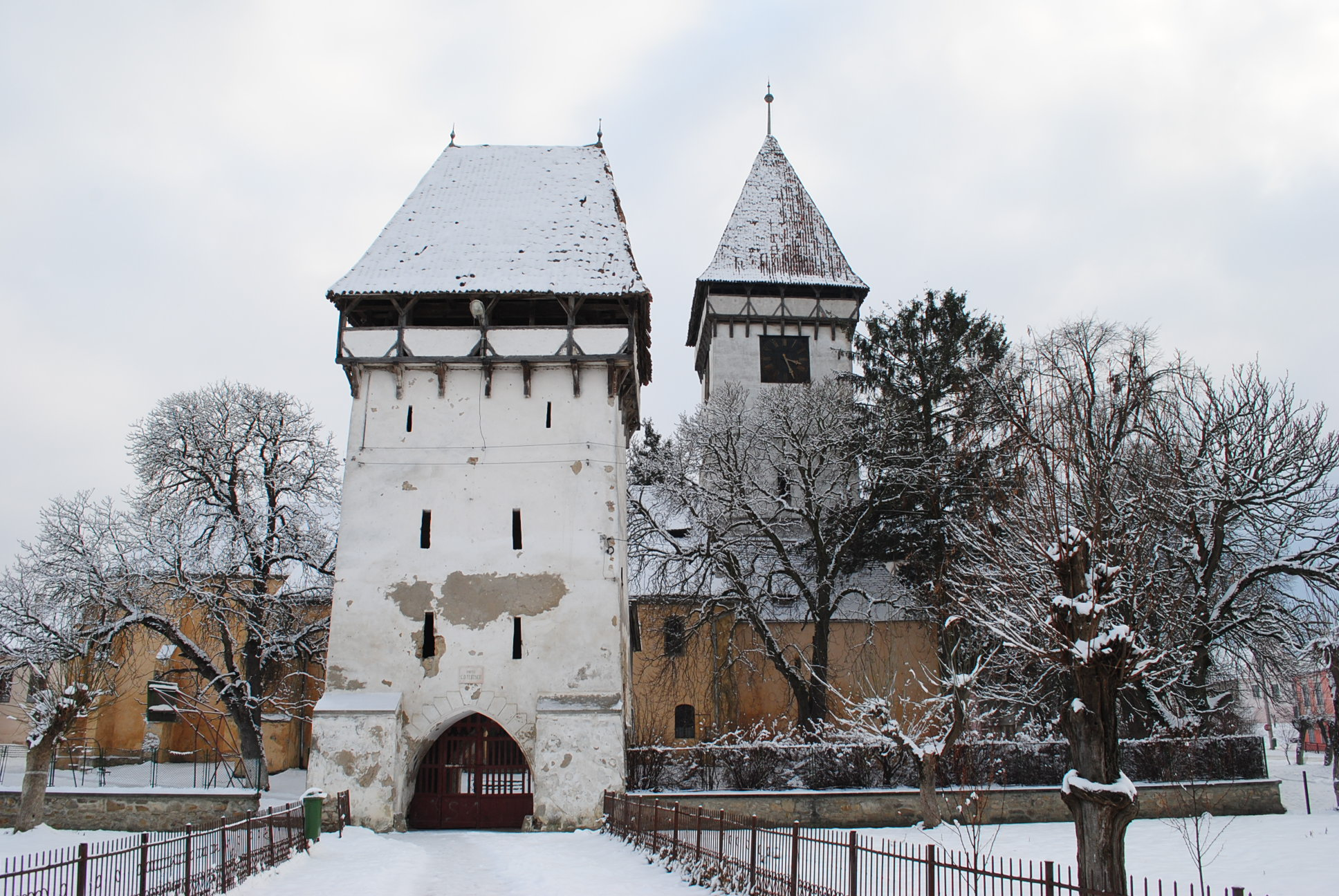
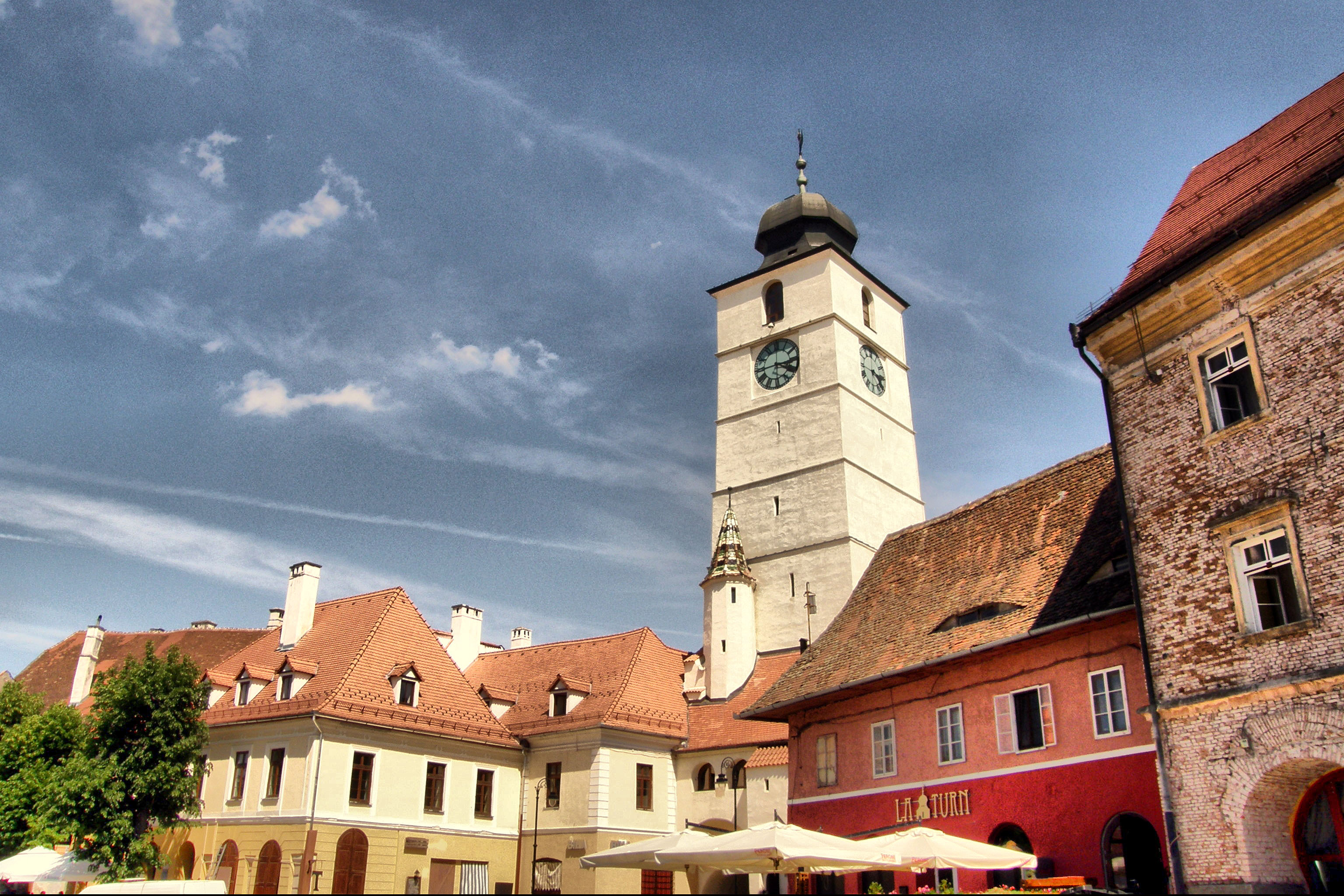
- Sibiu Cathedral Biertan Valea Viilor fortified church Păltiniș Bâlea Lake Cisnădie Agnita fortified church Council Tower of Sibiu

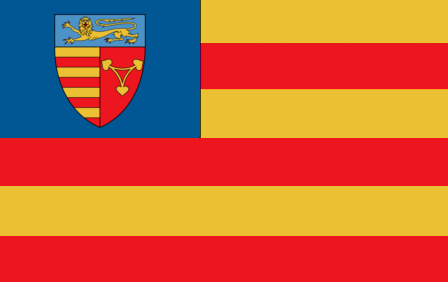
- Flag Coat of arms

- Coordinates: 45.87°N 24.23°E
- Country: Romania
- Development region: Centru
- Historical region: Transylvania
- Capital: Sibiu

Government
  - President of the County Board: Daniela Cîmpean (EPP)
  - Prefect: Mircea Dorin Crețu

Area
  - Total: 5,432 km^{2} (2,097 sq mi)
  - Rank: 24th

Population (2021-12-01)
  - Total: 388,326
  - Rank: 25th
  - Density: 71.49/km^{2} (185.2/sq mi)
- Telephone code: (+40) 269 or (+40) 369
- ISO 3166 code: RO-SB
- GDP (nominal): US$ 8,790 billion (2025)
- GDP per capita: US$ 22,635 (2025)
- Website: County Council; Prefecture

Sibiu County

Sibiu County (Romanian pronunciation: [siˈbiw]) is a county (Romanian: județ) of Romania, in the historical region of Transylvania. Its county seat (Romanian: reședință de județ) is the namesake town of Sibiu (German: Hermannstadt).

== Name ==
In Hungarian, it is known as Szeben megye, and in German as Kreis Hermannstadt. Under the Kingdom of Hungary, a county with an identical name (Szeben County, Romanian: Comitatul Sibiu) was created in 1876.

== Demographics ==
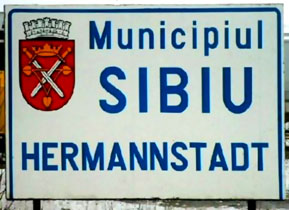
Romanian-German bilingual sign at the entrance in Sibiu (German: Hermannstadt)

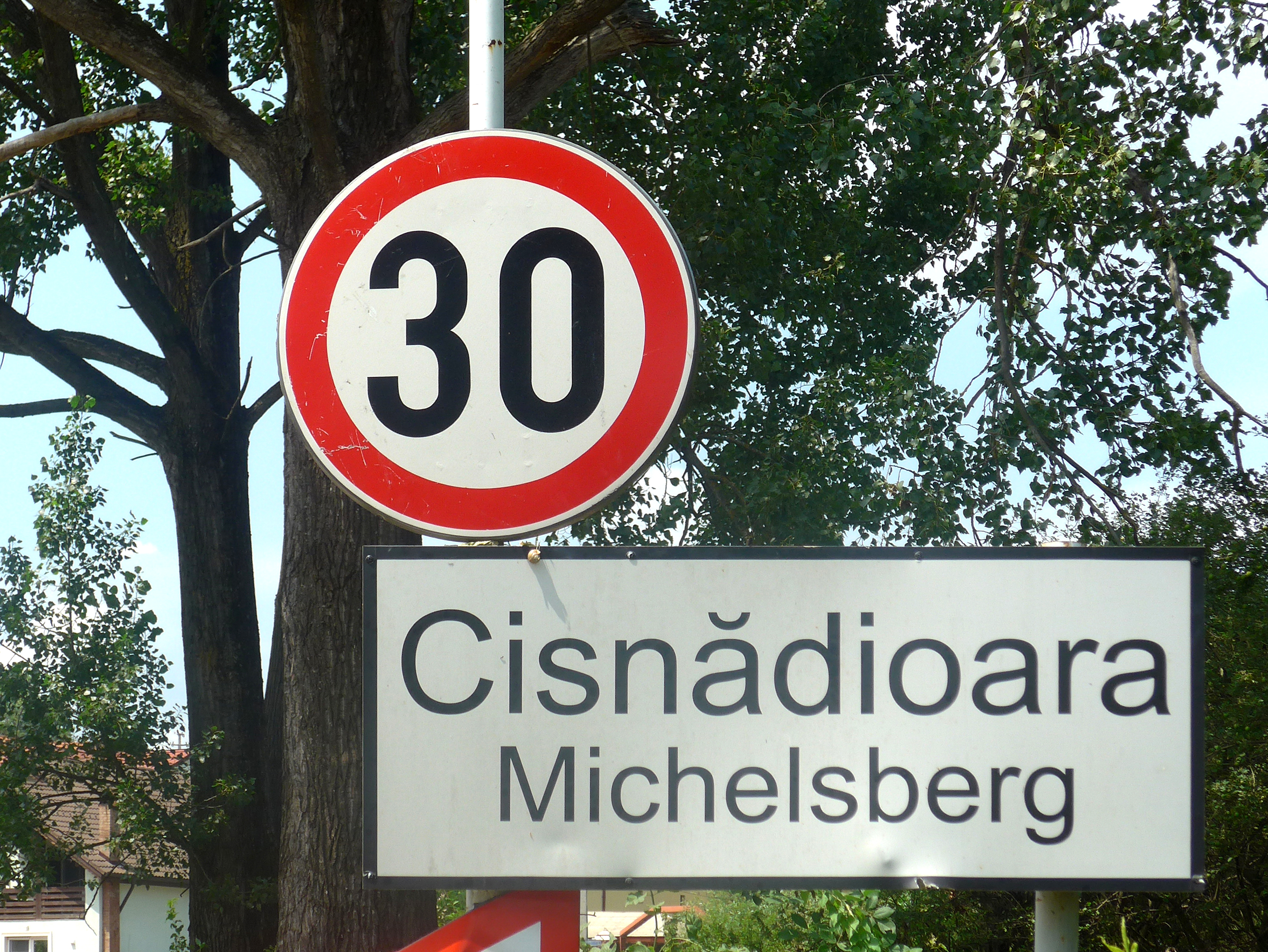
Romanian-German bilingual sign at the entrance in Cisnădioara (German: Michelsberg)

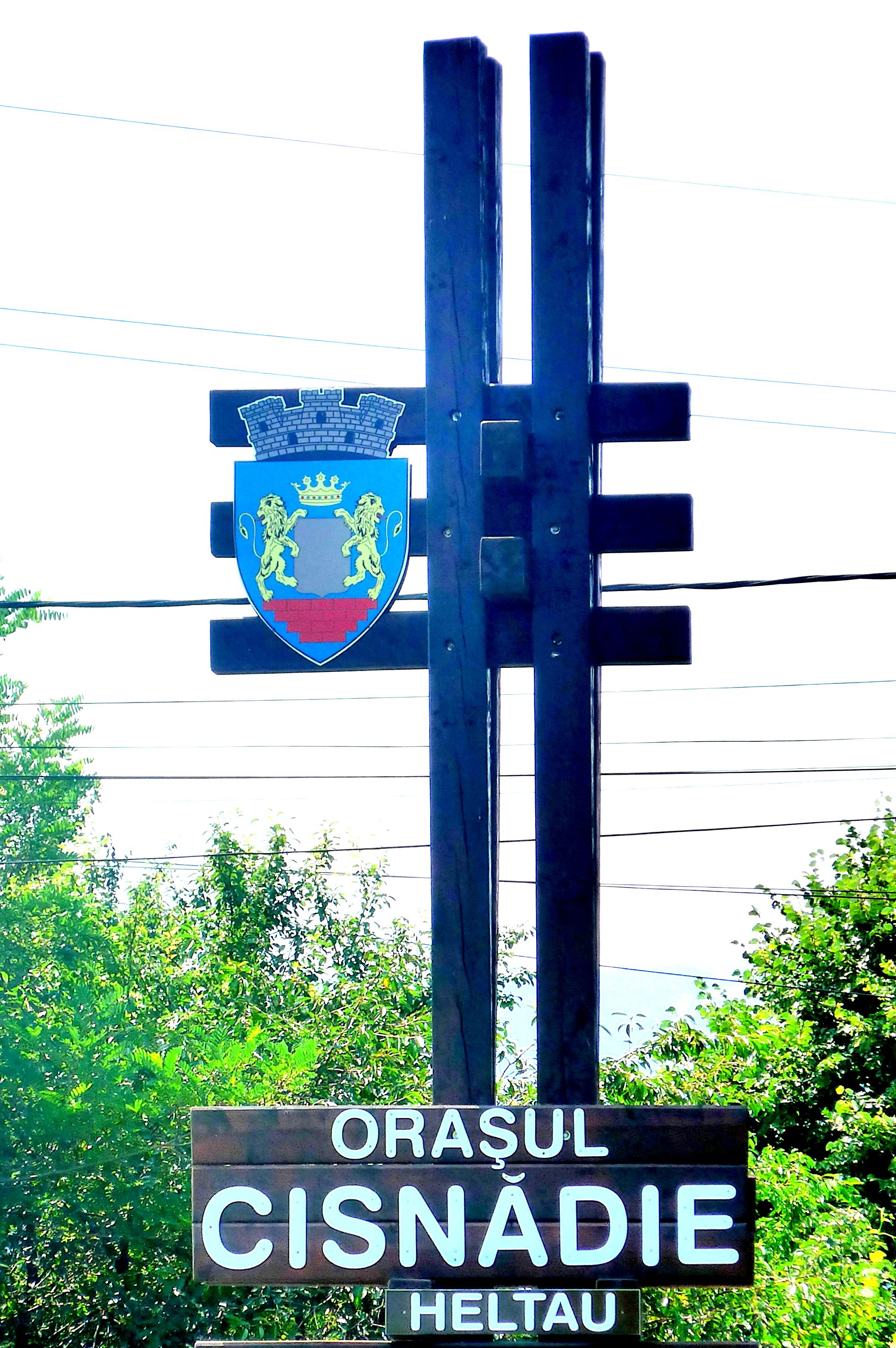
Romanian-German bilingual sign at the entrance in Cisnădie (German: Heltau)

At the 2021 census, Sibiu county had a population of 388.326 residents and a population density of 71.48/sq.km(27,59sq.mi)

At the 2011 census, the county has the following population indices:

- Romanians – 91.25% (or 340,836)
- Romani – 4.76% (or 17,901)
- Hungarians – 2.89% (or 10,893)
- Germans (Transylvanian Saxons) – 1.09% (or 4,117)
- Other – 0.1% (or 640)

At the 2021 census, the county has the following population indices:

- Romanians – 93.36% (or 313,118)
- Romani – 3.82% (or 12,808)
- Hungarians – 1.82% (or 6,112)
- Germans (Transylvanian Saxons) – 0.81% (or 2,716)
- Other – 0.19% (or 641)

Religion:

- Romanian Orthodox – 90.9%
- Greek Catholics – 2.3%
- Reformed – 2.0%
- Roman Catholics – 1.5%
- Pentecostals – 1.1%
- Baptists – 0.9%
- Other – 1.3%

Urbanisation – 5th most urbanised county in Romania:

- Urban dwellers: 277,574 (or 65.8%)
- Rural dwellers: 144,150 (or 34.2%)

Traditionally, the biggest minority in the county were Germans, but their numbers have decreased since World War II and especially after the Romanian Revolution of 1989.

The south side of the county, closer to the mountains was mainly inhabited by Romanians (Mărginimea Sibiului), and the north side of the country (the Transylvanian Plateau) was inhabited evenly by Germans and Romanians, but most Saxon villages are now deserted by their original ethnic German population. The Roma population, mainly from southern Romania, was placed close to the villages in the communist period and have since increased their numbers, especially in the Hârtibaciu valley.

Most of the population is concentrated in the Sibiu metropolitan area which has over 240 thousand inhabitants, with settlements like Șelimbăr, Cisnădie (especially the Arhitecților neighbourhood), Șura Mare, Șura Mică, Cristian, and Roșia having grown in population in the last 15 years, both from internal migration from the county and from other areas, mainly Vâlcea County. Tălmaciu and Avrig are other towns in the area.

Another population centre is the second largest city, Mediaș, with almost 40 thousand inhabitants, which forms a relatively higher population density area than the surrounding northern part of the county, with the nearby towns of Copșa Mică and Dumbrăveni and also communes like Bazna or Târnava.

Year	County population
1948	335,116 ▲
1956	372,687 ▲
1966	414,756 ▲
1977	481,645 ▲
1992	452,820 ▼
2002	421,724 ▼
2004	423,535 ▲
2007	424,855 ▲
2011	397,322 ▼
2021	388,326 ▼

== Geography ==
This county has a total area of 5,432 km^{2} (2,097 sq mi).

In the South side there are the Carpathian Mountains (Southern Carpathians) – the Făgăraș Mountains with heights over 2,500 m (8,200 ft), the Lotru Mountains, and the Cindrel Mountains – which make up to 30% of the county's surface. The Olt River crosses the mountains over to the South of Romania in Sibiu County, forming one of the most accessible links between Transylvania and Wallachia. In the North side there is the Transylvanian Plateau.

The most important rivers crossing the county are the Olt in the South with the Cibin as its main effluent, and the Târnava in the North.

=== Neighbours ===
- Brașov County in the East.
- Alba County in the West.
- Mureș County in the North.
- Vâlcea County in the South.
- Argeș County in the South-East.

== Economy ==
Sibiu County has one of the most dynamic economies in Romania, and is one of the regions with the highest level of foreign investment.

The predominant industries in the county are:

- Machine and automotive components
- Food industry
- Textile industry
- Wood industry

The biggest natural resource in the county is natural gas, especially in the north side, having one of the largest sources in the country.

In Copșa Mică during the communist period there were two chemical industrial complexes which polluted the environment heavily with carbon black, heavy metals, and other chemical substances. The area is still considered one of the most polluted communities in Europe. After 1989 many of the industrial complexes were shut down and the area is slowly recovering.

== Politics ==
The regional legislature is the County Council. Its president was Martin Bottesch (FDGR/DFDR) from 2004 to 2012. The Sibiu County Council, renewed at the 2024 local elections, consists of 32 counsellors, with the following party composition:

Party	Seats	Current County Council
National Liberal Party (PNL)	10	
Social Democratic Party (PSD)	8	
Democratic Forum of Germans (FDGR/DFDR)	5	
Alliance for the Union of Romanians (AUR)	4	
Save Romania Union (USR)	3	
Force of the Right (FD)	1	
People's Movement Party (PMP)	1	

== Tourism ==
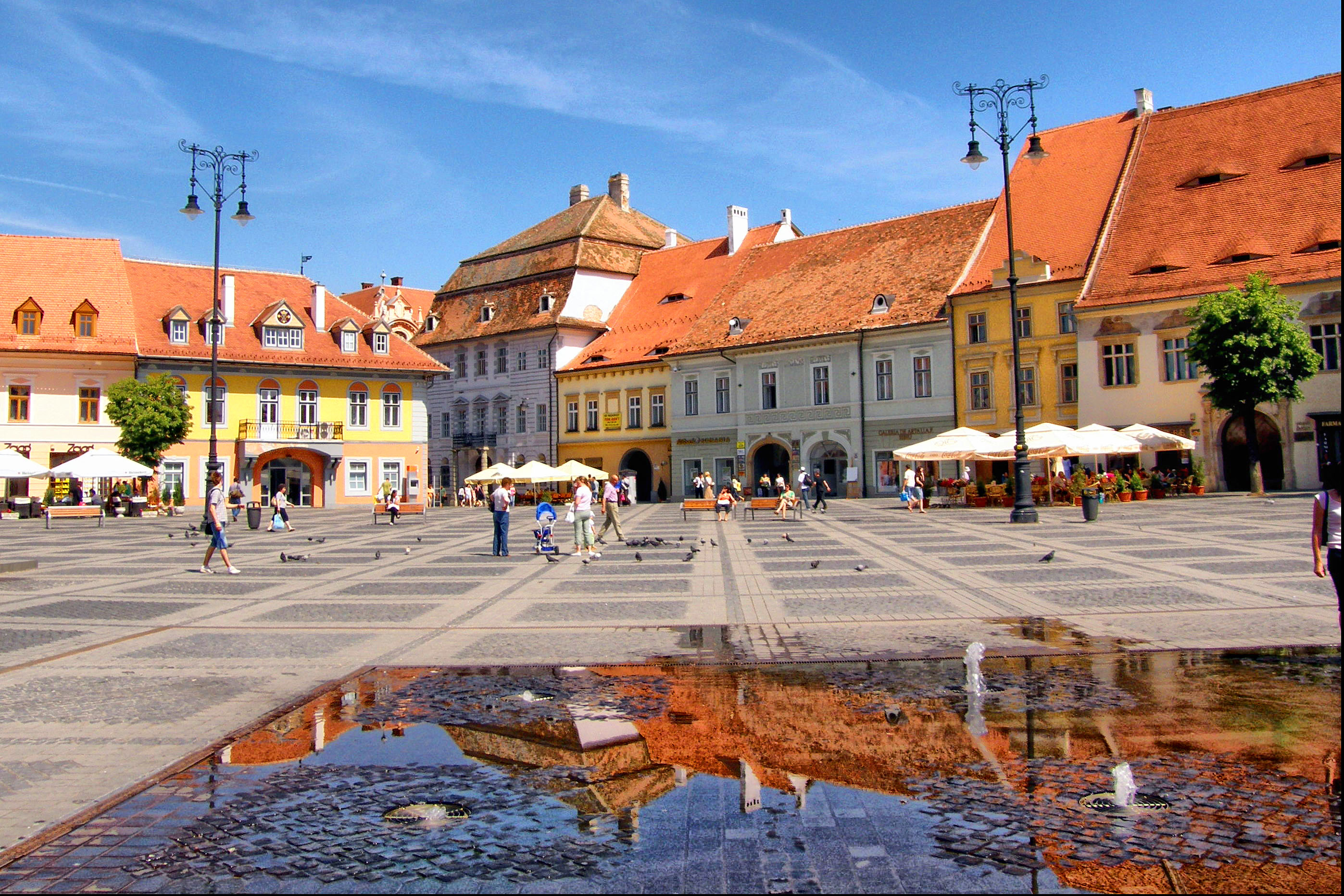
Sibiu (German: Hermannstadt, Hungarian: Nagyszeben)

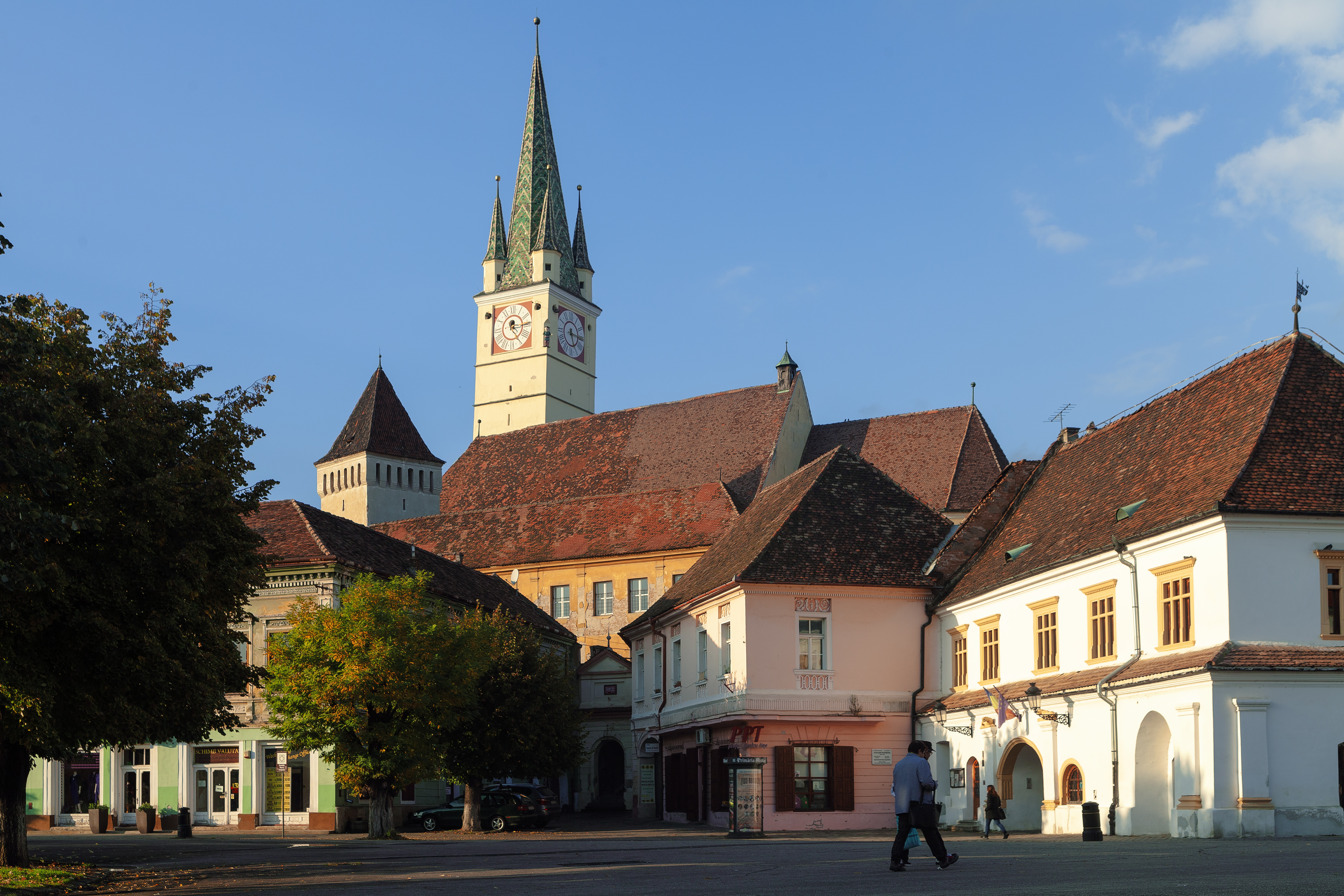
Mediaș (German: Mediasch, Hungarian: Medgyes)

The main tourist attractions in the county are:

- The city of Sibiu with its medieval fortifications and its historic centre
- The medieval city of Mediaș
- The medieval Saxon fortified churches and villages from Transylvania, some of them being UNESCO World Heritage Sites:
  - Biertan
  - Valea Viilor
  - Cisnădie
  - Cisnădioara
  - Slimnic
  - Agnita
- The abbey of Cârța
- The Făgăraș Mountains
  - The Bâlea Valley and the Transfăgărășan
  - The Negoiu Peak
- The Păltiniș mountain resort and the Cindrel Mountains
- The Ocna Sibiului, Bazna, and Miercurea Sibiului spa towns
- The Mărginimea Sibiului rural area
- The Via Transilvanica long-distance hiking and biking trail, which crosses the county

== Natives ==
- Emil Cioran
- Octavian Goga

== Administrative divisions ==
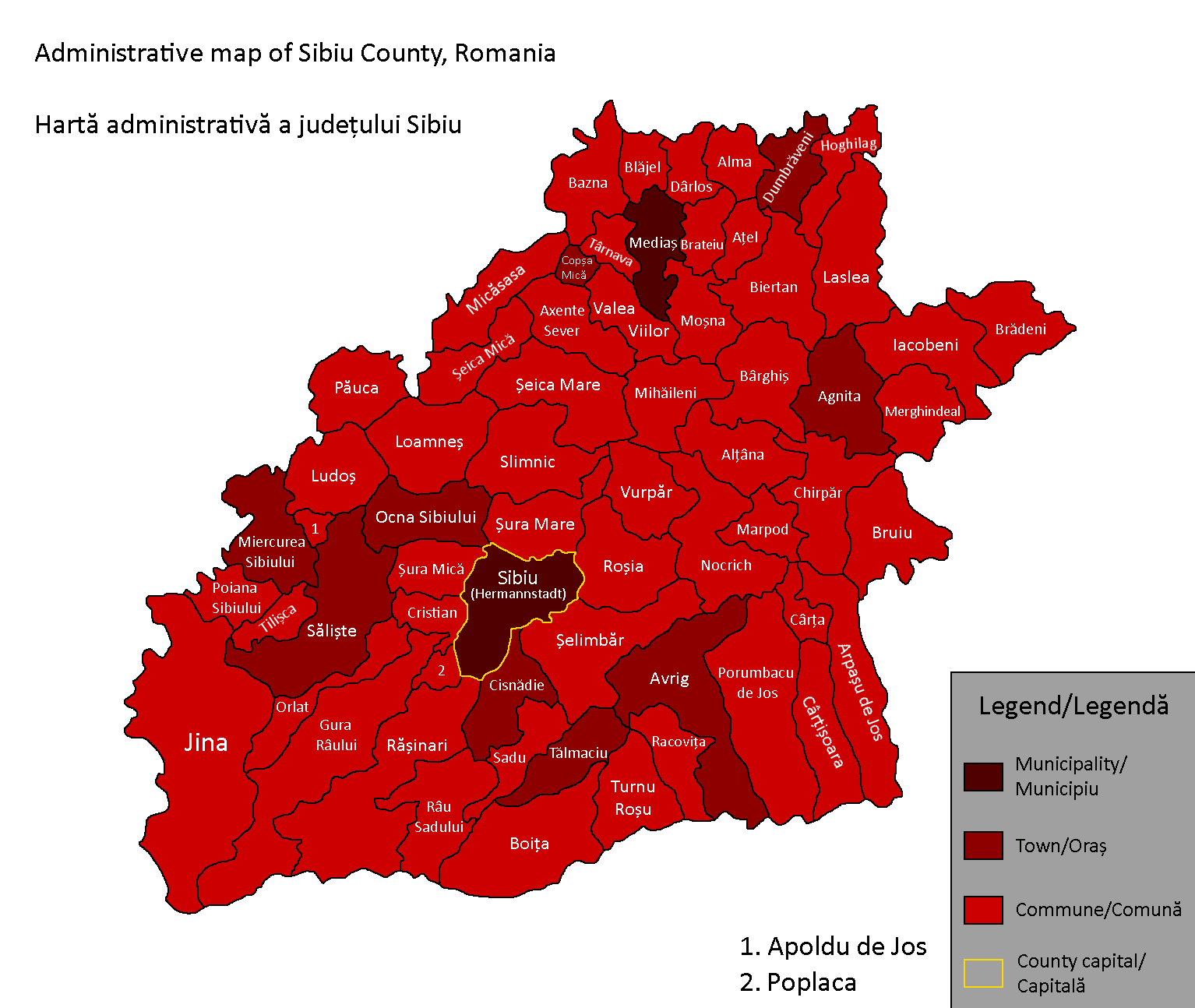
Administrative map of the county.

Sibiu County has 2 municipalities, 9 towns, and 53 communes

Municipalities

- Mediaș - second biggest city; population: 39,505
- Sibiu - capital city; population: 134,389 (as of 2021)

Towns

- Agnita; population: 7564
- Avrig; population: 12,534
- Cisnădie; population: 22,277
- Copșa Mică; population: 4570
- Dumbrăveni; population: 6238
- Miercurea Sibiului; population: 3619
- Ocna Sibiului; population: 3434
- Săliște; population: 5718
- Tălmaciu; population: 6711

Communes

- Alma
- Alțâna
- Apoldu de Jos
- Arpașu de Jos
- Ațel
- Axente Sever
- Bazna
- Bârghiș
- Biertan
- Blăjel
- Boița
- Brateiu
- Brădeni
- Bruiu
- Chirpăr
- Cârța
- Cârțișoara
- Cristian
- Dârlos
- Gura Râului
- Hoghilag
- Iacobeni
- Jina
- Laslea
- Loamneș
- Ludoș
- Marpod
- Merghindeal
- Micăsasa
- Mihăileni
- Moșna
- Nocrich
- Orlat
- Păuca
- Poiana Sibiului
- Poplaca
- Porumbacu de Jos
- Racovița
- Rășinari
- Râu Sadului
- Roșia
- Sadu
- Slimnic
- Șeica Mare
- Șeica Mică
- Șelimbăr
- Șura Mare
- Șura Mică
- Tilișca
- Târnava
- Turnu Roșu
- Valea Viilor
- Vurpăr

== Historical county ==
Județul Sibiu
- County (Județ)
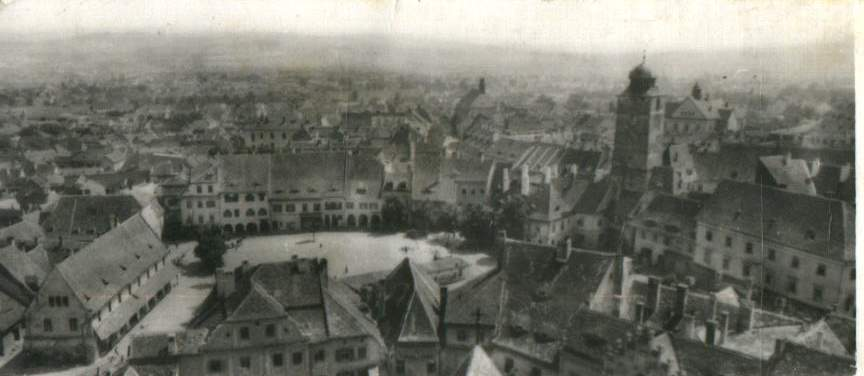
- Panoramic view of Sibiu in 1928.

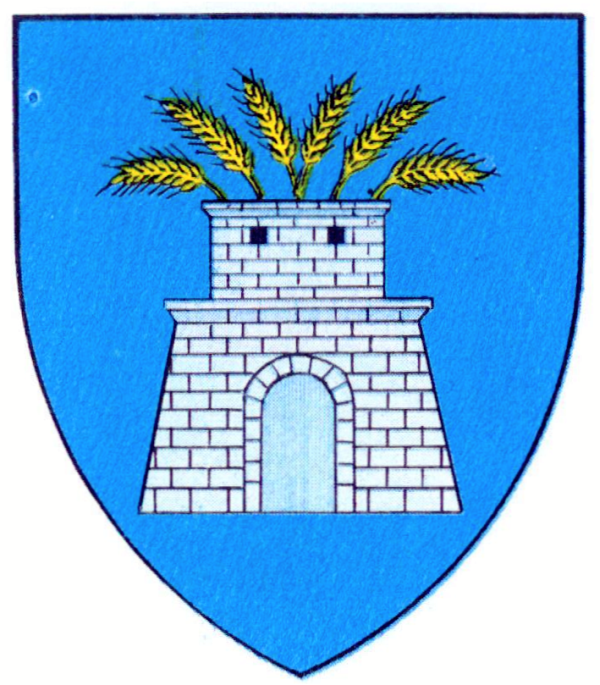
- Coat of arms

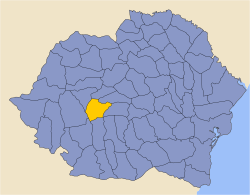
- Country: Romania
- Historic region: Transylvania
- Capital city (Reședință de județ): Sibiu
- Established: 1925

Area
  - Total: 3,531 km^{2} (1,363 sq mi)

Population (1930)
  - Total: 194,619
  - Density: 55.12/km^{2} (142.8/sq mi)
- Time zone: UTC+2 (EET)
  - Summer (DST): UTC+3 (EEST)

Historically, the county was located in the central part of Greater Romania, in the southern part of the historical region of Transylvania. The capital was Sibiu.

The interwar county's territory included most of the southwestern portion of today's Sibiu County, excluding the area around Vizocna that belonged to former Hungarian subdivision of Alsó-Fehér County, and the communes of Agârbiciu, Buia, Frâua, Hașag, Șeica Mare, and Șeica Mică, which all belonged to Târnava Mare County. Sibiu County once contained the district around Sebeș, which passed in 1925 to Alba County.

It was bordered to the west by the counties of Hunedoara and Alba, to the north by the counties of Târnava-Mică and Târnava Mare, to the east by Făgăraș County, and to the south by the counties of Gorj and Vâlcea.

=== Administration ===
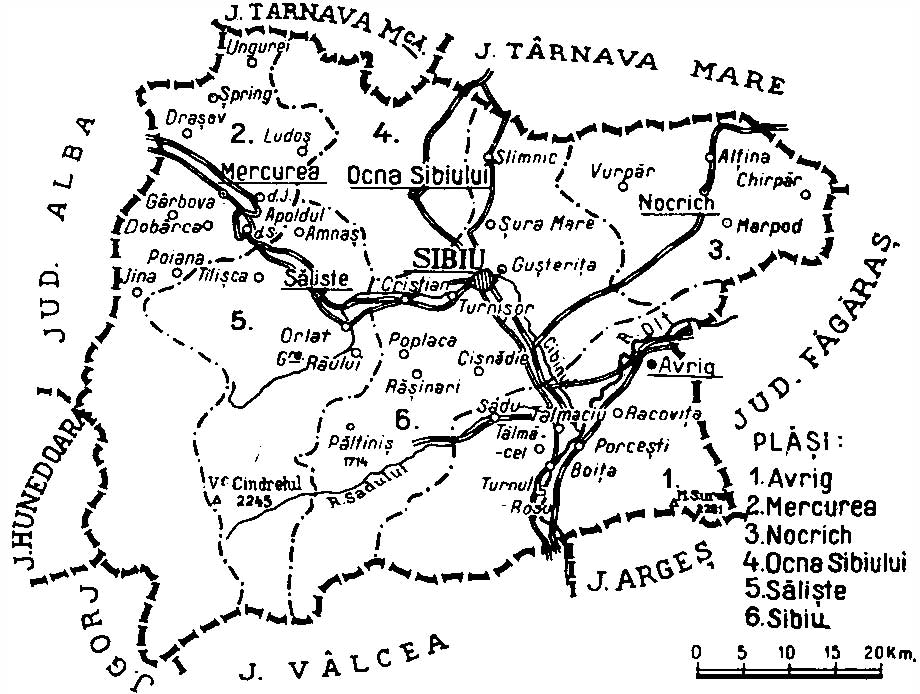
Map of Sibiu County as constituted in 1938.

The county originally consisted of the city of Sibiu and four districts (plăși):

1. Plasa Mercurea, headquartered at Mercurea
2. Plasa Ocna Sibiului, headquartered at Ocna Sibiului
3. Plasa Săliște, headquartered at Săliște
4. Plasa Sibiu, headquartered at Sibiu

A subsequent administrative division in 1937 had the county divided into the city of Sibiu and six districts:

1. Plasa Avrig, headquartered at Avrig
2. Plasa Mercurea, headquartered at Mercurea
3. Plasa Nocrich, headquartered at Nocrich
4. Plasa Ocna Sibiului, headquartered at Ocna Sibiului
5. Plasa Săliște, headquartered at Săliște
6. Plasa Sibiu, headquartered at Sibiu

=== Population ===
According to the census data of 1930, the county's population was 194,619, of which 62.0% were Romanians, 29.3% Germans, 4.7% Hungarians, as well as other minorities. In the religious aspect, the population consisted of 52.0% Eastern Orthodox, 27.8% Lutheran, 12.7% Greek Catholic, 4.0% Roman Catholic, 2.2% Reformed (Calvinist), as well as other minorities.

==== Urban population ====
In 1930, the urban population was ethnically divided as follows: 43.8% Germans, 37.7% Romanians, 13.2% Hungarians, 2.7% Jews, as well as other minorities. As a mother tongue in the urban population, German was spoken by 44.7% of the population, followed by Romanian (38.5%), Hungarian (13.7%), Yiddish (1.4%), as well as other minority languages. From the religious point of view, the urban population was made up of 38.8% Lutheran, 31.5% Eastern Orthodox, 12.9% Roman Catholic, 7.5% Greek Catholic, 5.2% Reformed, 2.9% Jewish, as well as other minorities.
