= Târnava, Sibiu =

Târnava
- Commune
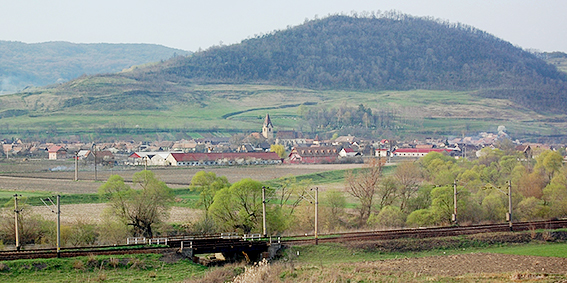
- Panoramic view of Târnava commune

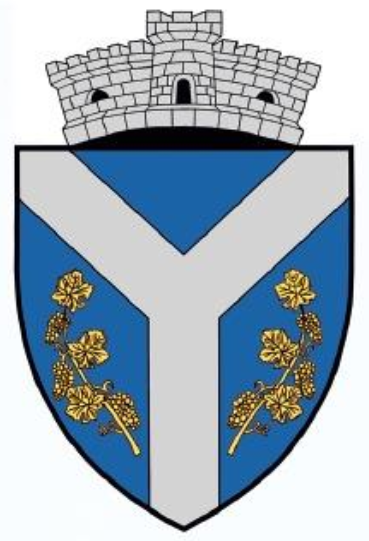
- Coat of arms

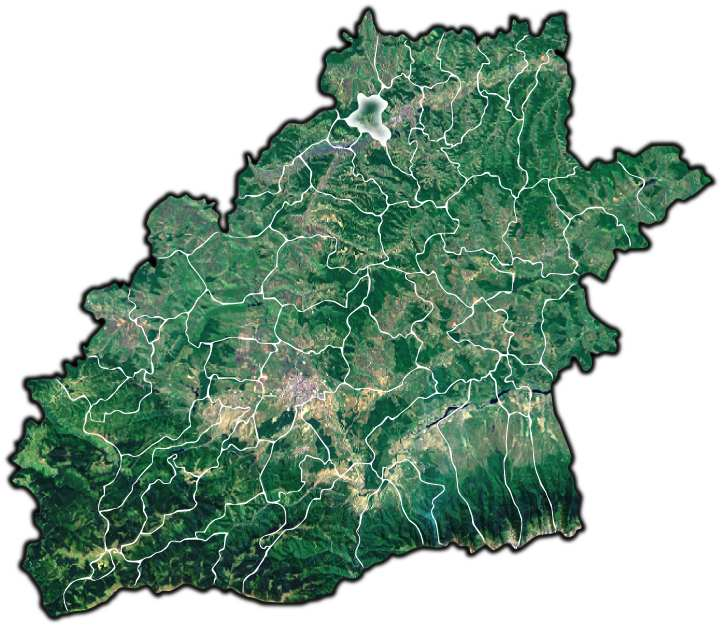
- Location in Sibiu County

- Location in Romania
- Coordinates: 46.141°N 24.293°E
- Country: Romania
- County: Sibiu

Government
  - Mayor (2020–2024): Norbert-Jácint Pleiner (PSD)
- Area: 29.38 km^{2} (11.34 sq mi)
- Elevation: 300 m (980 ft)
- Highest elevation: 600 m (2,000 ft)
- Population (2021-12-01): 3,007
  - Density: 102.3/km^{2} (265.1/sq mi)
- Time zone: UTC+02:00 (EET)
  - Summer (DST): UTC+03:00 (EEST)
- Postal code: 557275
- Area code: +(40) 269
- Vehicle reg.: SB
- Website: www.primariatirnava.ro

Târnava (German: Grossprobtsdorf; Hungarian: Nagyekemező) is a commune located in Sibiu County, Transylvania, Romania. It is composed of two villages, Colonia Târnava (Nagyekemezőtelep) and Târnava (formerly Proștea Mare).

== Geography ==
The commune is situated on the Transylvanian Plateau. It lies on the banks of the river Târnava Mare, in the northern part of the county, right in between the city of Mediaș and the town of Copșa Mică. The route of the Via Transilvanica long-distance trail passes through the village of Târnava.

== Demographics ==
At the 2011 census, the commune had 2,858 inhabitants, of which 64.6% were Romanians, 31.5% Roma, 2.7% Hungarians, and 1.1% Germans. At the 2021 census, Târnava had a population of 2,858; of those, 59.83% were Romanians and 26.64% Roma.

== Transport ==
Târnava is crossed by National Road DN14, which connects the county seat, Sibiu, to Sighișoara in Mureș County. There is also a train station that serves Line 300 of the CFR network, which connects Bucharest with the Hungarian border near Oradea.
