= Sadu =

- Commune
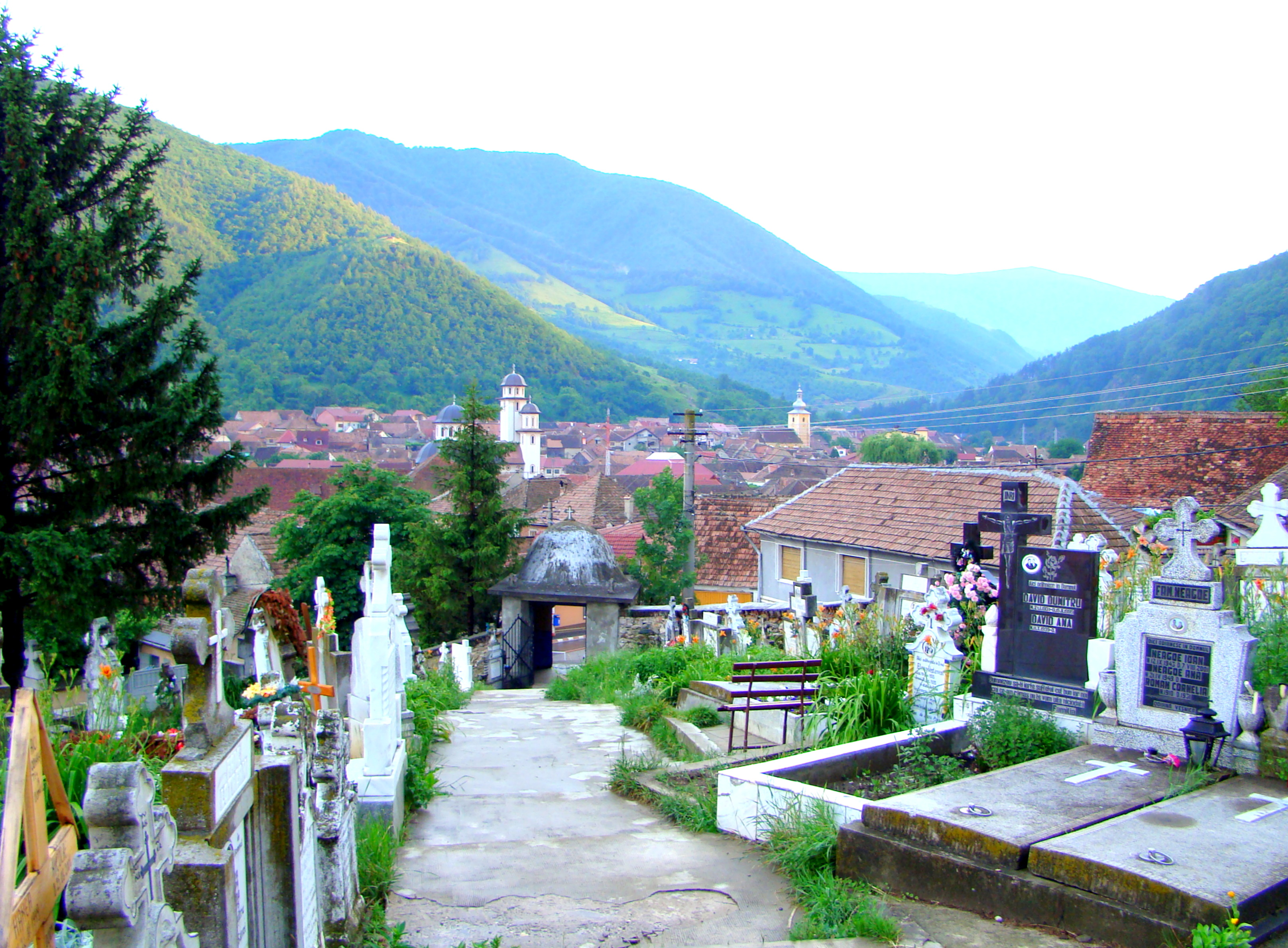

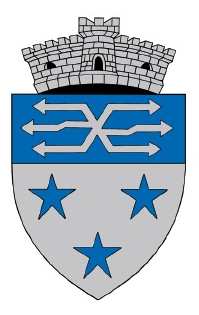
- Coat of arms

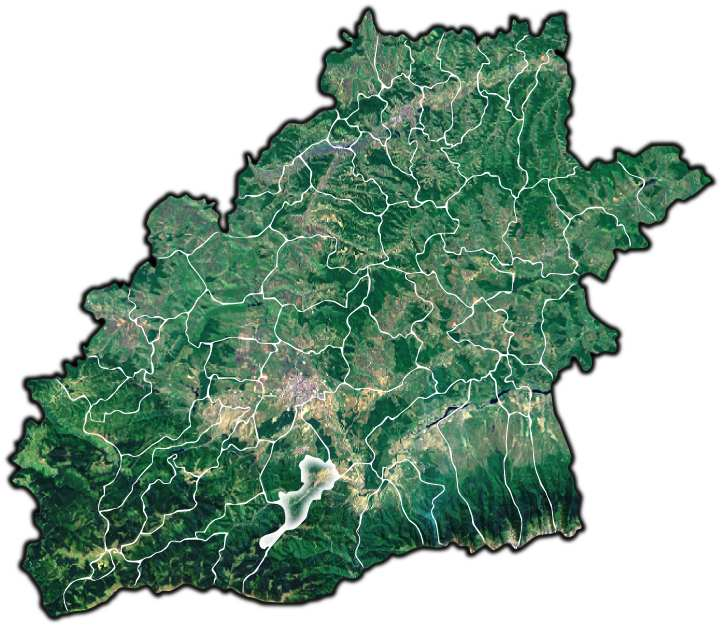
- Location in Sibiu County

- Location in Romania
- Coordinates: 45°40′N 24°11′E
- Country: Romania
- County: Sibiu

Government
  - Mayor (2020–2024): Valentin Dumitru Ioan Ivan (PNL)
- Area: 37.8 km^{2} (14.6 sq mi)
- Elevation: 480 m (1,570 ft)
- Population (2021-12-01): 2,561
  - Density: 67.8/km^{2} (175/sq mi)
- Time zone: UTC+02:00 (EET)
  - Summer (DST): UTC+03:00 (EEST)
- Postal code: 557220
- Area code: +(40) 269
- Vehicle reg.: SB
- Website: sadu.ro

Sadu (German: Zood; Hungarian: Cód) is a commune in Sibiu County, Transylvania, Romania, at the foothills of the Cindrel Mountains, 27 km south of the county capital Sibiu, in the Mărginimea Sibiului ethnographic area. It is composed of a single village, Sadu.

In 1910 the village had 2,143 inhabitants. At the 2021 census, Sadu had a population of 2,561, of which 91.25% were Romanians.

== Natives ==
The most notable people born in Sadu are:

- Inocențiu Micu-Klein (1692 – 1768), Romanian Greek-Catholic Bishop
- Samuil Micu-Klein (1745 – 1806), theologist, historian, philosopher, member of Transylvanian School
