= Cindrel Mountains =

Group of mountains in Romania

Coordinates: 45°35′N 23°47′E

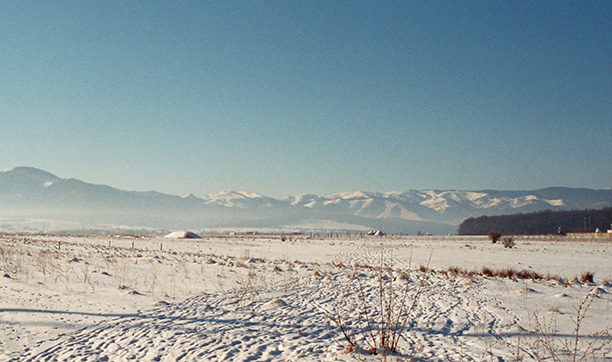
The snow-capped peaks of the Cindrel Mountains viewed from Sibiu

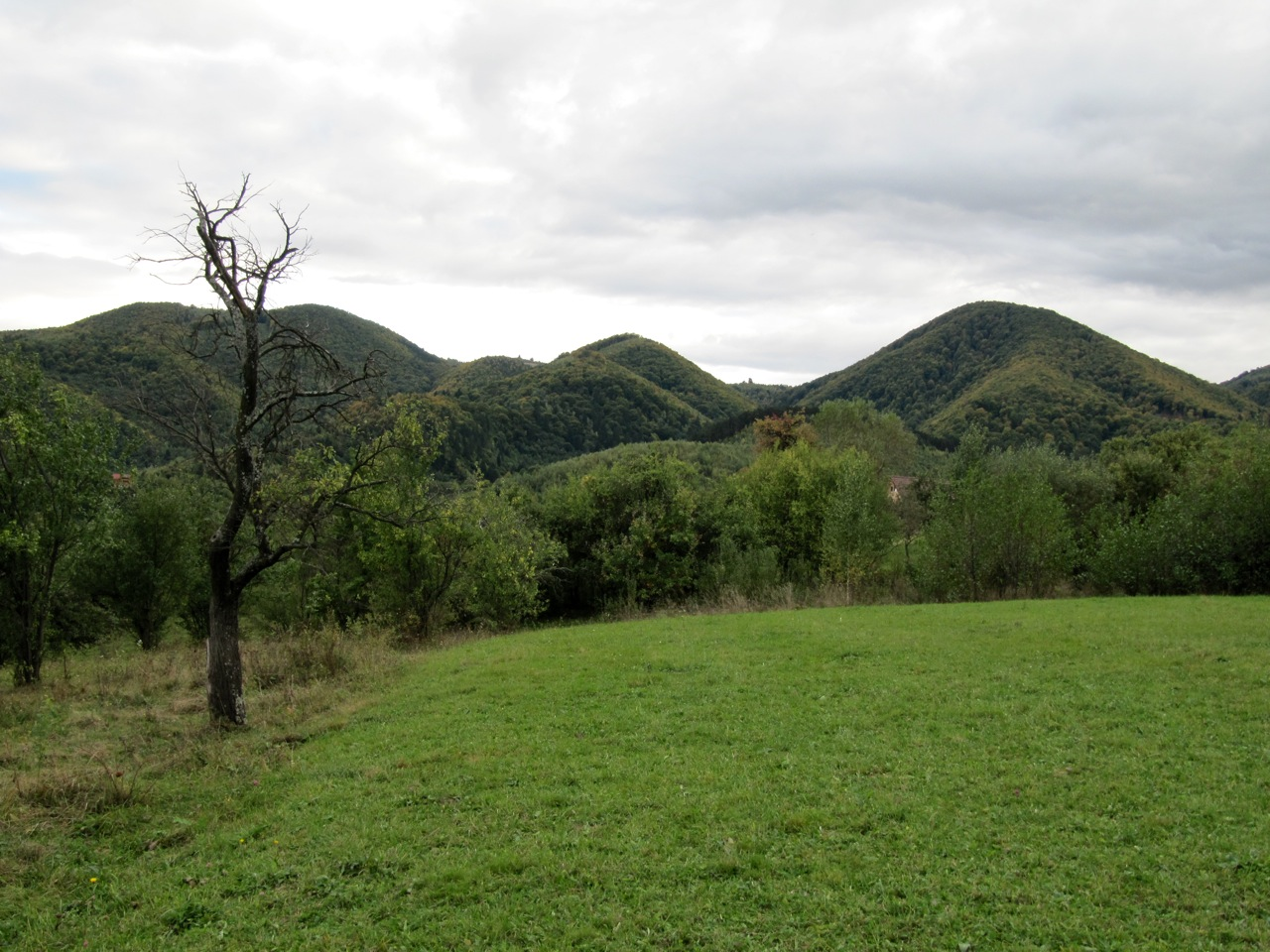
Cindrel Mountains view

Cindrel Mountains (also known as Cândrel Mountains, Cibin Mountains, or the Szeben Alps) are a group of mountains in central Romania in the centre of the Southern Carpathians, in the North-East of the Parâng Mountains group.

From the Transylvanian Plateau, with heights between 200 and 400 metres (660 and 1,310 ft), in the North and East, the heights grow abruptly through a zone of deep valleys at about 900 m (3,000 ft) on the verge of the massif where some villages are situated. The heights continue to grow slowly towards the highest peak, Cindrel Peak, at 2,244 m (7,362 ft). Only two other peaks in the range rise above 2000 metres: Balandrul Mare (2,210 m (7,250 ft)) and Starpului (2,146 m (7,041 ft)).

Mount Cindrel was the site of the World War I Battle of Mount Csindrel, part of the 1916 Battle of Transylvania.

Because the massif is easily accessible, the ethnographical area Mărginimea Sibiului has formed around the mountain, having sheep-herding and wood industry as the main occupations. On the Cibin and the Sadu rivers dams and hydro-electrical power plants were constructed, the oldest being the one from Sadu in 1896. The Păltiniș resort is situated halfway between the village of Rășinari and the Cindrel Peak, with hotels, chalets and a ski slope. The resort has developed around a small monastery in which the Romanian philosopher Constantin Noica spent the last part of his life.

The main river flowing from the mountain is the Cibin River, which collects most of the other smaller rivers. Between the Cindrel Mountains and the Transylvanian Plateau, the river forms a wide depression—the Sibiu Depression—in which the main city in the area, Sibiu, lies. The ethnographic region known as Mărginimea Sibiului is located there.
