= German exonyms (Transylvania) =

List of exonyms for settlements in Transylvania, Romania

Below is a list of German language exonyms for towns and villages in Transylvania, Romania.

German name	Romanian name	Hungarian name
Abtsdorf (near Marktschelken)	Țapu	Csicsóholdvilág
Abtsdorf (near Agnetheln)	Apoș	Szászapátfalva
Adamesch	Adămuș	Ádámos
Agnetheln	Agnita	Szentágota or Ágotafalva
Aitau	Aita Mare	Nagyajta
Ajerschteln	Agrișteu	Egrestő
Alexanderhausen	Șandra	Sándorháza
Allerheiligen	Mesentea	Kismindszent
Almaschken	Alma	Küküllőalmás
Almen	Alma Vii	Szászalmád
Almesch	Șoimuș	Sajósolymos
Altenberg	Baia de Criș	Körösbánya
Altflagen	Feleag	Magyarfelek
Alt-Sadowa	Sadova Veche	Ószadova
Alt-Schenk	Șinca	Ósinka
Alttohan	Tohanul Vechi	Tohán
Alzen	Alțâna	Alcina
Appesdorf	Mănăștur	Kolozsmonostor
Appfeldorf	Merișor	Pusztaalmás
Arbegen	Agârbiciu	Szaszegerbegy
Arendorf	Araci	Árapatak
Arkeden (near Bistritz)	Archiud	Mezőerked
Arkeden (near Schäßburg)	Archita	Erked
Auen	Cușma	Kusma
Auendorf	Gura Râului	Guraró
Baaßen	Bazna	Bázna
Bachnen	Bahnea	Bonyha
Bad Tuschnad	Băile Tușnad	Tusnádfürdő
Badlinen	Beclean	Betlen
Bägendorf	Benești	Bendorf
Baierdorf	Crainimăt	Királynémeti
Ballendorf	Balomiru de Câmp	Balomir
Bärendorf	Beriu	Berény
Bartholomä	Bartolomeu	Óbrassó
Batiz	Batiz	Batiz
Baumgarten (near Bistritz)	Bungard	Szászbongárd
Baumgarten (near Hermannstadt)	Bungard	Bongárd
Bayerdorf	Crainimăt	Királynémeti
Bedendorf	Bidiu	Bödön
Bekokten	Bărcut	Báránykút
Bell	Buia	Bólya
Belleschdorf	Idiciu	Jövedics
Benden	Biia	Magyarbénye
Benzenz	Aurel Vlaicu	Bencenc
Bernhardsdorf	Bernadea	Bernád
Besotten	Buza	Búza
Bethlen	Beclean	Bethlen
Bidda	Bidiu	Bödön
Bienengärten	Stupini	Brassó-Méhkertek
Bierldorf	Bârla	Berlád
Billak / Attelsdorf	Domnești	Bilak
Birk	Petelea	Petele
Birnbaum	Ghirbom	Oláhgorbó
Birthälm	Biertan	Berethalom
Bistritz	Bistrița	Beszterce
Bladenmarkt	Bălăușeri	Balavásár
Blasendorf	Blaj	Balázsfalva
Blumendorf	Belin	Bölön
Blutroth	Berghin	Berve
Bodeln	Budila	Bodola
Bodendorf	Bunești	Szászbuda
Bodesdorf	Buduș	Alsóbudak
Bogeschdorf	Băgaciu	Szászbogács
Bonnesdorf	Boian	Alsóbajom
Borbant	Bărăbanț	Borbánd
Botsch	Batoș	Bátos
Botschard	Bucerdea Grânoasă	Buzásbocsárd
Braller	Bruiu	Brulya
Breit	Bretea	Magyarberéte
Brenndorf	Bod	Botfalu
Broos	Orăștie	Szászváros
Bruck	Bonțida	Bonchida
Buchholz	Boholț	Boholc
Budenbach	Sibiel	Szibiel
Bulkesch	Bălcaciu	Bolkács
Burgberg (bei Hermannstadt)	Vurpăr	Vurpód
Burgberg (bei Mühlbach)	Vurpăr	Borberek
Bürgesch	Bârghiș	Bürkös
Burghalle	Orheiul Bistriței	Óvárhely
Burglos	Dej	Dés
Bußd (near Mühlbach)	Boz	Buzd
Bußd (near Mediasch)	Buzd	Szászbuzd
Langenfeld	Câmpulung la Tisa	Hosszúmező
Dahl	Dăișoara	Longodár
Dallen	Deal	Dál
Dallendorf	Daia Română	Oláhdálya
Dengel	Daia	Dányán
Denndorf	Daia	Szászdálya
Dersch	Dârjiu	Székelyderzs
Deutschbach	Valea Sasului	Szászvölgy
Deutsch-Budak	Budacu de Jos	Szászbudak
Deutschendorf	Mintiu Gherlii	Szamosújvárnémeti
Deutsch-Kreuz	Criț	Szászkeresztúr
Deutsch-Pien	Pianul de Jos	Alsópián
Deutsch-Tekes	Ticușul Vechi	Szásztyúkos
Deutsch-Weißkirch	Viscri	Szászfehéregyháza
Deutsch-Zepling	Dedrad	Dedrád
Diemrich	Deva	Déva
Dienesdorf	Șieu Odorhei	Sajóudvarhely
Dittersdorf	Ditrău	Ditró
Dobolló	Dobârlău	Dobolló
Dobring	Dobârca	Doborka
Donnersmarkt	Mănărade	Monora
Dopich	Dopca	Datk
Draas	Drăușeni	Homoróddaróc
Drachenbach (Traschen)	Drăguș	Dragus
Dragomir	Dragomirești	Dragomérfalva (Dragomérfalu)
Dreikirchen	Teiuș	Tövis
Dunesdorf	Daneș	Dános
Durles	Dârlos	Darlac
Dürrbach	Dipșa	Dipse
Egresch	Igris	Egres
Ehrgang	Ernea	Szászernye
Eibesdorf	Ighișu Nou	Szászivánfalva
Eisch	Fântânele	Szász-Újős
Eisdorf	Ionești	Homoródjánosfalva
Eisenburg	Rimetea	Torockó
Eisenmarkt	Hunedoara	Vajdahunyad
Elisabethstadt (formerly Eppeschdorf)	Dumbrăveni	Erzsébetváros
Elsterdorf	Sereca	Szereka
Emerichsdorf	Sântimbru	Marosszentimre
Engenthal	Mighindoala	Ingodály
Ensch	Enciu	Szászencs
Etschdorf	Iernuțeni	Radnótfája
Eulenbach	Ilimbav	Illenbák
Falk	Feleac	Fellak
Feigendorf	Micăsasa	Mikeszásza
Feisket	Sălcuța	Fűzkút
Felldorf	Filitelnic	Fületelke
Felmern	Felmer	Felmér
Felsendorf	Florești	Földszin
Fenesch	Florești	Szászfenes
Fleck	Feleacu	Erdöfelek
Fogarasch	Făgăraș	Fogaras
Frauenbach	Baia Mare	Nagybanya
Frauendorf	Axente Sever	Asszonyfalva
Frauenkirch	Sântămărie	Boldogfalva
Frauenvolk	Asinip	Asszonynépe
Freck	Avrig	Felek
Freißendorf	Lunca Bistriței	Friss
Fürstenberg	Hăghic	Hidvég
Fürstendorf	Acâș	Ákos
Füssen	Feisa	Küküllőfajsz
Galatz (near Fogarasch)	Galați (Făgăraș)	Galac
Gallusdorf	Galeș	Szebengálos
Galt	Ungra	Ugra
Garndorf	Ardan	Árdány
Gassen	Vălenii de Mureș	Disznajó
Geist	Apața	Apáca
Gela	Gilău	Gyalu
Gergeschdorf	Ungurei	Gergelyfája
Gergesdorf	Căpâlna de Jos	Alsókápolna
Gierelsau	Bradu	Fenyőfalva
Gieshübel	Gusu	Kisludas
Gindusdorf	Băița	Mezőbanyica
Gladen	Gledin	Gledény
Gogeschburg	Gogan-Varola	Gógán-Váralja
Grabendorf	Vale	Vále
Großalisch	Seleuș	Keménynagyszőllős
Großau (Grossau)	Cristian (Sibiu)	Kereszténysziget
Großbun	Boiu	Bún
Großdäwätsch	Diviciorii Mari	Nagydevecser
Großeidau	Viile Tecii	Kolozsnagyida
Großendorf (bei Bistritz)	Mărișelu	Sajónagyfalu
Großendorf (bei Hermannstadt)	Săliște	Szelistye
Großkend	Chendu Mare	Nagykend
Großkopisch	Copșa Mare	Nagykapus
Großobstdorf	Almașu Mare	Nagyalmás
Großpold (Grosspold, Grosspolden, Oberpold)	Apoldu de Sus	Nagyapold
Gier	Giera	Gyer
Großlasseln	Laslea	Szászszentlászló
Großlogdes	Ludoș	Nagyludas
Großprobstdorf	Târnava	Nagyekemező
Großrapolt	Rapoltu Mare	Nagyrápolt
Groß-Sankt Nikolaus	Sânnicolau Mare	Nagyszentmiklós
Großschenk	Cincu	Nagysink
Großschergied	Cergăul Mare	Magyarcserged
Großscheuern	Șura Mare	Nagycsűr
Großschlatten	Abrud	Abrudbánya
Großschogen	Șieu	Nagysajó
Groß-Zegendorf	Țagu	Nagycég
Großwardein	Oradea	Nagyvarad
Grubendorf	Ceuaș	Szász-Csávás
Gugendorf	Gogan	Gógán
Gunzendorf	Poplaca	Popláka
Gürteln	Gherdeal	Gerdály
Guttenbrunn	Zabrani	Temeshidegkút
Hahnbach	Hamba	Kakasfalva
Halmagen	Hălmeag	Halmágy
Halwelagen or Halvelagen	Hoghilag	Holdvilág
Hamlesch	Amnaș	Omlás
Hammersdorf	Gușterița	Szenterzsébet
Hamruden	Homorod	Homoród
Härwesdorf	Cornățel	Hortobágyfalva
Hasendorf	Milaș	Nagynyulas
Haschagen	Hașag	Hásság
Hatzfeld	Jimbolia	Zsombolya
Heidendorf	Viișoara	Besenyő
Heldsdorf	Hălchiu	Höltövény
Heltau	Cisnădie	Nagydisznód
Henndorf	Brădeni formerly Hendorf	Hégen
Henningsdorf	Henig	Henningfalva
Heresdorf	Galații Bistriței	Galacfalva
Herkulesbad	Băile Herculane	Herkulesfürdő
Hermannstadt	Sibiu	Nagyszeben
Hetzeldorf	Ațel	Ecel
Hochfeld	Fofeldea	Hóföld
Hohe Rinne	Păltiniș	Szebenjuharos
Hohenwarte	Straja	Őregyháza
Hohndorf	Viișoara	Csatófalva
Holzmengen	Hosman	Holcmány
Honigberg	Hărman	Szászhermány
Hühnerbach	Glâmboaca	Glimboka
Hundertbücheln	Movile	Százhalom
Irmesch	Ormeniș	Szászörményes
Jaad	Livezile	Jád
Jakobsdorf (near Agnetheln)	Iacobeni (Agnita)	Jakabfalva
Jakobsdorf (near Bistritz)	Sâniacob	Szászszentjakab
Jakobsdorf (near Mediasch), or Gogeschdorf	Giacăș	Gyákos
Johannisberg	Nucet	Szentjánoshegy
Johannisdorf (near Bistritz)	Sântioana	Sajószentiván
Johannisdorf (an der Kokel)	Sântioana	Szászszentiván
Käbesch	Coveș	Ágotakövesd
Kakowa	Dumbrava	Sebeskákova
Kallesdorf	Arcalia	Árokalja
Kaltbrunnen	Calbor	Kálbor
Kaltenbrunnen	Uilac	Újlak
Kaltwasser	Calvasăr	Hidegvíz
Kapolna	Căpâlna	Sebeskápolna
Käppelsbach	Cărpiniș	Kerpenyes
Karlsburg (formerly Weißenburg)	Alba Iulia	Gyulafehérvár
Kastendorf	Castău	Kasztó
Kastenholz	Cașolț	Hermány
Katzendorf	Cața	Kaca
Keisd	Saschiz	Szászkézd
Kellen	Colun	Kolun
Kelling	Câlnic	Kelnek
Kerschdorf	Presaca	Székásgyepű
Kertzing	Gornești	Gernyeszeg
Kerz	Cârța	Kerc
Kesseln	Chesler	Keszlér
Kiewern	Cobor	Kóbor
Kindeln	Chintelnic	Kentelke
Kirchberg	Chirpăr	Kürpöd
Kirtsch	Curciu	Küküllőkőrös
Klausenburg	Cluj-Napoca	Kolozsvár
Klein-Alisch	Seleuș	Szászszőllős
Kleinbistritz	Dorolea	Aszúbeszterce
Kleinblasendorf	Blăjel	Balázstelke
Kleindäwätsch	Diviciorii Mici	Kisdevecser
Kleindörfel	Micești	Ompolykisfalud
Kleinenyed	Sângătin	Kisenyed
Kleinfarken	Delenii	Magyarsáros
Kleinkopisch	Copșa Mică	Kiskapus
Kleinlasseln	Laslăul Mic	Kisszentlászló
Kleinmühlbach	Sebeșel	Sebeshely
Kleinphlepsdorf	Filipișul Mic	Kisfülpös
Kleinpold	Apoldul des Jos	Kisapold
Kleinprobstdorf	Târnăvioara, formerly Proștia Mică	Kisekemező
Kleinrumes	Romoșel	Romoszhely
Kleinschangen	Șieuț	Kissajó
Kleinschelken	Șeica Mică	Kisselyk
Kleinschenk	Cincșor	Kissink
Kleinschergied	Cergăul Mic	Bolgárcserged
Kleinscheuern	Șura Mică	Kiscsűr
Kleinschlatten	Zlatna	Szász-Zalatna
Kleinschogen	Sieuț	Kissajó
Kleintalmesch	Tălmăcel	Kistalmács
Kleinzegendorf	Țăgșoru	Kiscég
Klosdorf (an der Kokel)	Sânmiclăuș	Bethlenszentmiklós
Klosdorf (near Reps)	Cloașterf	Miklóstelke
Kokelburg	Cetatea de Baltă	Küküllővár
Kokt	Cut	Kútfalva
Köllendorf	Caila	Kajla
Komeloden	Comlod	Komlód
Königsberg	Crihalma	Királyhalma
Königsdorf	Paloș	Pálos
Konradsdorf	Poenița	Oláhtyúkos
Kormosbach	Racoșul de Sus	Felsőrákos
Kormospatak	Comăna de Jos	Komána/Alsókomána/Komárom
Kowasna	Covasna	Kovászna
Kowatschi	Covaci	Temeskovácsi
Kradendorf	Broșteni	Kiskerék
Krakau	Cricău	Boroskrakkó
Krapundorf	Ighiu	Magyarigen
Krebsbach (near Hermannstadt)	Fântânele	Szebenkákova
Krebsbach (near Kronstadt)	Crizbav	Krizba
Kreisch	Criș	Keresd
Kreuzburg	Teliu	Keresztvár
Kronstadt	Brașov	Brassó
Krotschendorf	Crăciunelu de Sus	Felsőkarácsonfalva
Kudschir	Cugir	Kudzsir
Kupferbergwerk	Bălan	Balánbánya
Kyrieleis	Chiraleș	Kerlés
Ladmesch	Loamneș	Ladamos
Langendorf	Lancrăm	Lámkerék
Langenthal	Valea Lungă	Hosszúaszó
Langenthal	Luncoiu de Jos	Alsólunkoj
Laßlenkirch	Livezile	Úrháza
Laurentz	Leorinț	Lőrincréve
Leblang	Lovnic	Lemnek
Lechnitz	Lechința	Szászlekence
Lehr	Luieriu	Lövér
Leresdorf	Șieu Sfântu	Sajószentandrás
Leschkirch	Nocrich	Újegyház
Lona	Luna de Sus	Magyarlóna
Ludwigsdorf	Logig	Szász-Ludvég
Magarei	Pelișor, formerly Măgărei	Magaré
Makendorf	Mocod	Szamosmákod
Maldorf	Domald	Domáld
Malmkrog	Mălâncrav	Almakerék
Maniersch	Măgheruș	Küküllőmagyaros
Mardisch	Moardăș	Mardos
Marienburg (near Kronstadt)	Feldioara	Földvár
Marienburg (near Schäßburg)	Hetiur	Hétúr
Mariensdorf	Sântămăria de Piatră	Kőboldogfalva
Marktschelken	Șeica Mare	Nagyselyk
Markusdorf	Mărcuș	Márkos
Marpod	Marpod	Márpod
Marmaroschsiget (Siget)	Sighetu Marmației	Máramarossziget
Martinsberg	Șomartin	Mártonhegy
Martinsdorf	Metiș	Szász-Mártonfalva
Mathesdorf	Matei	Szentmáté
Mausdorf	Săcalu de Pădure	Erdőszakál
Mediasch	Mediaș	Medgyes
Meeburg	Beia	Homoródbene
Meeport	Hopârta	Háporton
Mercydorf	Carani	Mercyfalva
Mergeln	Merghindeal	Morgonda
Meschen	Moșna	Szász-Muzsna
Meschendorf	Meșendorf	Mese
Mettersdorf	Dumitra	Nagydemeter
Michelsberg	Cisnădioara	Kisdisznód
Michelsdorf (an der Kokel)	Veseuș	Szásznagyvesszős
Michelsdorf (near Marktschelken)	Boarta	Mihályfalva
Miereschhall	Ocna Mureș	Marosújvár
Mikesdorf	Părău	Páró
Mildenburg	Alămor	Alamor
Minarken	Monariu	Malomárka
Mindorf	Monor	Monorfalva
Mitteldorf	Chiuza	Középfalva
Moichen	Mohu	Móh
Mönchsdorf	Herina	Harina
Moritzdorf	Moruț	Aranyosmóric
Moritzfeld	Măureni	Mritzföld
Mortesdorf	Motiș	Mártontelke
Mühlbach	Sebeș	Szászsebes
Mukendorf	Grânari	Nagymoha
Myttersdorf	Dumitra	Demeterpataka
Nadesch	Nadeș	Szásznádas
Neithausen	Netuș	Netus
Neppendorf	Turnișor	Kis-Torony
Netz	Nețeni	Nec
Neudorf (near Hermannstadt)	Noul	Szászújfalu
Neudorf (near Karlsburg)	Ohaba	Székásszabadja
Neudorf (near Kronstadt)	Satu Nou	Barca-Újfalu
Neudorf (near Schäßburg)	Noul Săsesc	Apaújfalu
Neudorf (near Straßburg)	Rădești	Tompaháza
Neuflagen	Mureni	Szederjes
Neuhammer in der Tschik	Mădăraș	Csíkmadaras
Neumarkt am Mieresch	Târgu Mureș	Marosvásárhely
Neupanat	Horia	Ujpanát
Neuschloß	Gherla	Szamosújvár
Neustadt (near Agnetheln)	Noiștat	Újváros
Neustadt (near Kronstadt)	Cristian (Brașov)	Keresztényfalva
Niedereidisch	Ideciu de Jos	Alsóidecs
Niederneudorf	Corvinești	Kékesújfalu
Niederrohnen	Rona de Jos	Alsóróna
Nieresch	Nireș	Szász-Nyíres
Niklasmarkt	Gheorgheni	Gyergyószentmiklós
Nimesch	Nemșa	Nemes
Nindorf	Nimigea de Jos	Magyarnemegye
Nitzkydorf	Nițchidorf	Niczkyfalva
Nösen (former name for Bistritz)	Bistrița	Beszterce
Nußbach	Măieruș	Szászmagyaros
Nussendorf	Năsăud	Naszód
Oberblasendorf	Blăjenii de Sus	Felsőbalázsfalva
Oberbrodsdorf	Vinerea	Felkenyér
Obereidisch	Ideciu de Sus	Felsőidecs
Oberkreuz	Cristur-Șieu	Bethlenkeresztúr
Oberneudorf	Cetate	Felsőszászújfalu
Oberrohnen	Rona de Sus	Felsőróna
Oberrübendorf	Vătava	Felsőrépa
Obersebesch	Sebiș	Sajófelsősebes
Oberschewesch	Sebeșu de Sus	Oltfelsősebes
Oberwischau	Vișeu de Sus	Felsővisó
Ochsendorf	Boița	Bojca
Odendorf	Apalina	Abafája
Oderhellen (Hofmarkt)	Odorheiu Secuiesc	Székelyudvarhely
Offenburg	Baia de Arieș	Aranyosbánya
Okne	Ocnița	Mezőakna
Orschowa	Orșova	Orsova
Orzydorf	Orțișoara	Orczyfalva
Panagen	Pănade	Panád
Pankota	Pâncota	Pankota
Paßbusch	Posmuș	Paszmos
Perkaß	Pricaz	Perkász
Pernseifen	Băița	Boica
Peschendorf	Stejăreni	Bese
Petersberg	Sânpetru	Barcaszentpéter
Petersdorf (near Bistritz)	Petriș	Petres
Petersdorf (near Marktschelken)	Petiș	Kispéterfalva
Petersdorf (near Mühlbach)	Petrești	Péterfalva
Petsch	Petecu	Petek
Pintak (near Tekendorf)	Pinticiu	Szászpéntek
Pintak (near Wallendorf)	Slătinița	Pinták
Pojana	Poiana Sibiului	Polyán
Pränzdorf	Suseni	Marosfelfalu
Pretai	Bratei	Baráthely
Probstdorf	Stejărișu	Prépostfalva
Pruden	Prod, Romania	Prod
Puschendorf	Păucea	Pócstelke
Radeln	Roadeș	Rádos
Ragelsdorf	Ragla	Rágla
Rakowitz	Racovița	Oltrákovica
Rätsch	Reciu	Szebenrécse
Rauthal	Roandola	Rudály
Reckentek	Reteag	Retteg
Reichau	Răhău	Rehó
Reichesdorf	Richiș	Riomfalva
Reissen	Rusu Bârgăului	Oroszborgó
Rekitta	Răchita	Rekitta
Reps	Rupea ehem. Cohalm	Kőhalom
Reschitz	Reșița	Resiczabanya
Retersdorf	Retiș	Réten
Reußdorf	Cund	Kund
Reußdörfchen	Rusciori	Oroszcsűr
Reussen (near Bistritz)	Sărățel	Szeretfalva
Reussen (near Mediasch)	Ruși	Rüsz
Reußmarkt	Miercurea Sibiului	Szerdahely
Rod	Rod	Ród
Rode	Zagăr	Zágor
Rodna	Rodna	Óradna
Rohrbach	Rodbav	Nádpatak
Rosch	Răvășel	Rovás
Roseln	Ruja	Rozsonda
Rosenau	Râșnov	Barcarozsnyó
Roter Turm	Turnul Roșu	Vöröstorony
Rothbach	Rotbav	Szászveresmart
Rothberg	Roșia	Veresmart
Rothkirch (near Bistritz)	Strugureni	Mezőveresegyháza
Rothkirch (near Mühlbach)	Roșia de Secaș	Székásveresegyháza
Ruckersdorf	Rucăr	Rukkor
Rumänisch Baierdorf	Mintiu	Oláhnémeti
Rumänisch Budak	Budacul de Sus	Felsőbudak
Rumänisch Eibesdorf	Ighișu Vechi	Oláhivánfalva
Rumänisch Lasseln	Laslăul Mare	Nagyszentlászló
Rumänisch Neudorf	Noul Român	Oláhújfalu
Rumänisch Pien	Pianul de Sus	Felsőpián
Rumänisch Sankt Georgen	Sângeorz-Băi	Oláhszentgyörgy
Rumänisch Tekes	Ticușul Nou	Felsőtyúkos
Rumes	Romos	Romosz
Sachsenbach	Spătac	Szászpatak
Sachsenhausen	Săsăuși	Szászház
Sächsisch Regen (Sächsisch Reen)	Reghin	Szászrégen
Saderlach	Zădăreni	Zádorlak
Salz	Sărata	Sófalva
Salzbach	Șeușa	Sóspatak
Salzburg	Ocna Sibiului	Vizakna
Salzdorf	Ocna Dejului	Désakna
Salzfelden	Poiana Sărată	Sósmező
Salzgrub	Cojocna	Kolozs
Salzgruben	Ocnița	Mezőakna
SanktAnna	Sântana	Újszentanna
Sankt Georgen	Sfintu Gheorghe	Sepsiszentgyörgy
Sankt Georgen	Sângeorzu Nou	Szászszentgyörgy
Sankt Martin	Târnăveni	Dicsőszentmárton
Sathmar	Satu Mare	Szatmárnémeti
Schaal	Șoala	Sálya
Schaas	Șaeș	Segesd
Schaldorf	Mihăileni	Sálfalva
Schalko	Șalcău	Salko
Schalmen	Șoimuș	Küküllősolymos
Scharberg	Dumbrăvioara	Sáromberke
Schard (near Karlsburg)	Șard	Sárd
Schard (near Schäßburg)	Șoard	Küküllősárd
Scharosch (near Fogarasch)	Șoarș	Sáros
Scharosch (near Mediasch)	Șaroș pe Târnave	Szászsáros
Scharpendorf	Glodeni	Marossárpatak
Schäßburg	Sighișoara	Segesvár
Schelken	Jeica	Zselyk
Schellenberg	Șelimbăr	Sellenberk
Scherling	Măgurele	Serling
Schirkanyen	Șercaia	Sárkány
Schlatt	Zlagna	Szászzalatna
Schmiegen	Șmig	Somogyom
Schnakendorf	Dumbrăvița	Szunyogszég
Scholten	Cenade	Szászcsanád
Schomlenmarkt	Șimleu Silvaniei	Szilágysomlyó
Schönau	Șona	Szépmező
Schönberg	Dealul Frumos	Lesses
Schönbirk	Sigmir	Szépnyir
Schöndorf	Frumușeni	Szépfalu
Schönen	Șona	Sona
Schugag	Șugag	Sugág
Schorsten	Șoroștin	Sorostély
Schulerau	Poiana Brașov	Brassópojána
Schwarzwasser	Săcel	Szecsel
Schweinsdorf	Turnu Roșu	Porcsesd
Schweischer	Fișer	Sövénység
Sebeschel	Sibișel	Ósebeshely
Seck	Sic	Szék
Seiburg	Jibert	Zsiberk
Seiden	Jidvei	Zsidve
Seimesdorf	Simionești	Simontelke
Seligstadt	Seliștat	Boldogváros
Senndorf	Jelna	Kiszsolna
Siben	Jibou	Zsibó
Sibendorf	Șopteriu	Septér
Siebendörfer	Șapte Sate/Săcele	Hétfalu/Négyfalu
Silwasch	Silivaș	Vízszilvás
Simkragen	Șintereag	Somkerék
Sinna	Jina	Zsinna
Sommer	Jimbor	Szászzsombor
Sommerburg	Jimbor	Székelyzsombor
Spring	Șpring	Spring
Städterdorf	Rășinari	Resinár
Steierdorf-Anina	Anina	Stájerlakanina
Stein (near Marktschelken)	Ștenea	Isztina
Stein (near Reps)	Dacia formerly Ștena	Garat
Stolzenburg	Slimnic	Szelindek
Straßburg	Aiud	Nagyenyed
Streitfort	Mercheașa	Mirkvásár
Strugar	Strungari	Sztrugár
Szekler Neumarkt	Târgu Secuiesc	Kézdivásárhely
Szeklerburg	Miercurea Ciuc	Csíkszereda
Szeklerkreuz	Cristuru Secuiesc	Székelykeresztúr
Talmesch	Tălmaciu	Nagytalmács
Tarteln	Toarcla	Kisprázsmár
Tartlau	Prejmer	Prázsmár
Taterloch	Tătârlaua	Felsőtatárlaka
Taters	Totoi	Táté
Tatsch	Tonciu	Tács
Tekendorf	Teaca	Teke
Temeschburg / Temeswar	Timișoara	Temesvár
Tetscheln	Aciliu	Ecsellő
Teufelsdorf	Vânători	Héjjasfalva
Thalheim	Daia	Dolmány
Thorenburg	Turda	Torda
Thorstadt	Doștat	Hosszutelke
Tilischka	Tilișca	Tilicske
Tobsdorf	Dupuș	Táblás
Topesdorf	Câmpeni	Topánfalva
Tordesch	Turdaș	Tordos
Töplitz	Toplița	Maroshévíz
Törnen	Păuca	Pókafalva
Törzburg	Bran	Törcsvár
Trappold	Apold	Apold
Traßten	Lunca	Tekeújfalu
Treppen	Tărpiu	Szásztörpény
Trestenburg	Tășnad	Tasnád
Triebswetter	Tomnatic	Nagyösz
Troschen	Drașov	Drassó
Tschanad	Cenad	Csanád
Tschapertsch	Topârcea	Toporcsa
Tschene	Cenei	Csene
Tschippendorf	Cepari	Csépán
Ungarisch-Brettendorf	Bretea Streiului	Magyarbrettye
Ungarisch-Opatitz	Opatița	Magyarapáca
Ungarisch Regen (Ungarisch Reen)	Reghin Sat	Magyarrégen
Ungarisch Birk	Beica de Jos	Alsóbölkény
Ungarisch Zepling	Goreni	Dedrádszéplak
Ungersdorf	Șieu Măgheruș	Sajómagyaros
Unterblasendorf	Blăjenii de Jos	Alsóbalázsfalva
Unterbrodsdorf	Șibot	Alkenyér
Untergesäß	Ghijasa de Jos	Alsógezés
Unterrübendorf	Râpa de Jos	Alsórépa
Untersebesch (near Bistritz)	Ruștior	Sajósebes
Untersebesch (near Hermannstadt)	Sebeșul de Jos	Oltalsósebes
Untervenitze	Veneția de Jos	Alsóvenice
Unterwardein	Oarda de Jos	Alsómarosváradja
Urmenen	Armeni	Örményszékes
Urwegen	Gârbova	Szászorbó
Vajasd	Oiejdea	Vajasd
Viktoriastadt	Victoria	Viktóriaváros
Wallahisch-Birk	Beica de Sus	Felsőbölkény
Waldhütten	Valcid	Váldhíd
Wallendorf	Unirea	Aldorf
Waltersdorf	Dumitrița	Kisdemeter
Warmwasser	Hoghiz	Olthévíz
Wassid	Veseud	Szászvessződ
Weichseldorf	Meșreac	Meggykerék
Weidenbach	Ghimbav	Vidombák
Weidenthal	Brebu-nou	Temesfö
Weiersdorf	Tău	Székástóhát
Weilau	Uila	Vajola
Weingartskirchen	Vingard	Vingárd
Weißhorn	Săsarm	Szeszárma
Weißkirch (near Bistritz)	Albeștii Bistriței	Fehéregyház
Weißkirch (near Schäßburg)	Albești, Mureș	Fehéregyháza
Wepeschdorf	Pipea	Pipe
Werd	Vărd	Vérd
Wermesch	Vermeș	Vermes
Westen	Veștem	Vesztény
Wetsch	Brâncovenești	Marosvécs
Wetscherd	Vecerd	Vecsérd
Windau	Ghinda	Vinda
Winsberg	Orlat	Orlát
Winz	Vințu de Jos	Alvinc
Witzau	Vița	Vice
Wladein	Vlădeni	Vledény
Woiwoden	Vaidei	Vajdej
Woldorf	Văleni	Dombos
Wolfsberg	Gărâna	Szörényordas
Wolkendorf (near Kronstadt)	Vulcan, Brașov	Szászvolkány
Wolkendorf (near Schäßburg)	Vulcan	Volkány
Wolkersdorf (Kreis Hunedoara)	Vulcan, Hunedoara	Zsilyvajdevulkan
Wölz	Velț	Völc
Woßling	Țeline	Pusztacelina
Wurmloch	Valea Viilor	Nagybaromlaka
Zagendorf	Țigău	Szászcegő
Zeiden	Codlea	Feketehalom
Zekeschdorf	Cunța	Konca
Zendersch	Senereuș	Szénaverös
Zernest	Zărnești	Zernest
Zied	Veseud	Vessződ
Ziegenthal	Țichindeal	Cikendál
Zillenmarkt (Waltenberg)	Zalău	Zilah
Zoltendorf	Mihai Viteazu	Zoltán
Zood	Sadu	Cód
Zuckmantel	Țigmandru	Cikmántor

== See also ==
- German exonyms
- List of European exonyms
- List of Transylvanian Saxon localities
