= Friss =

Friss may refer to:

- Friss, the German name for Lunca village, Șieuț Commune, Bistrița-Năsăud County, Romania
- Friss, another name for the Hungarian folk dance term Friska
