= Großendorf =

Großendorf or Grossendorf may refer to:

- A city district of Büdingen, Germany
- A district of Ried im Traunkreis, Austria
- The German name of Săliște, Romania
- The German name of Władysławowo, Poland
- The German name of Mărișelu, a commune in Bistrița-Năsăud County, Transylvania, Romania
