= Șieu, Bistrița-Năsăud =

Șieu
- Commune
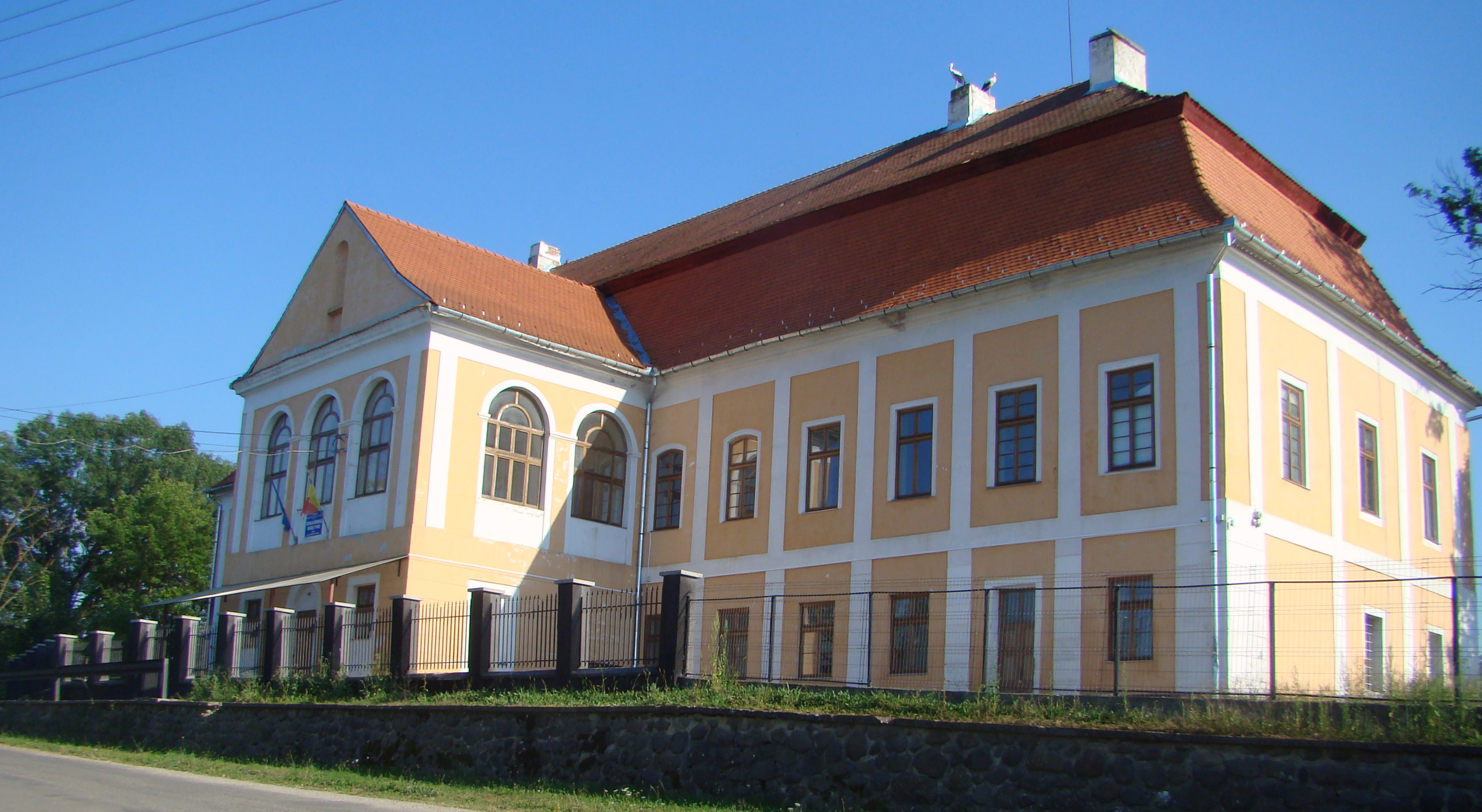
- Rákóczi Castle in Șieu

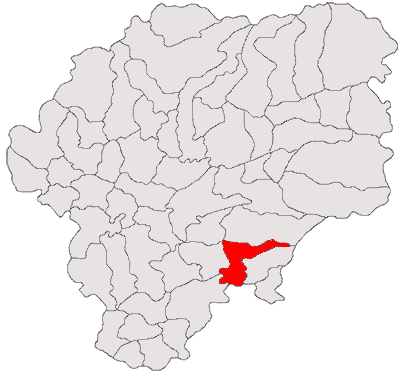
- Location in Bistrița-Năsăud County

- Location in Romania
- Coordinates: 47°N 24.6°E
- Country: Romania
- County: Bistrița-Năsăud

Government
  - Mayor (2020–2024): Ioan-Sebastian Cifor-Tiniș (PSD)
- Area: 71.98 km^{2} (27.79 sq mi)
- Elevation: 406 m (1,332 ft)
- Population (2021-12-01): 2,932
  - Density: 40.73/km^{2} (105.5/sq mi)
- Time zone: UTC+02:00 (EET)
  - Summer (DST): UTC+03:00 (EEST)
- Postal code: 427290
- Area code: +(40) 263
- Vehicle reg.: BN
- Website: www.comunasieu.ro

Șieu (formerly Șieul Mare, Șieul de Jos; Hungarian: Nagysajó or Alsósajó; German: Großschogen or Gross-Schogen or Gross-Schagen; Transylvanian Saxon: Griuszschogn) is a commune in Bistrița-Năsăud County, Transylvania, Romania.

It is composed of four villages: Ardan (Árdány; Garendorf or Garndorf or Jordan), Posmuș (Paszmos; Paßbusch; Transylvanian Saxon: Puespesch), Șieu, and Șoimuș (Sajósolymos or colloquially Solymos; Almesch).

The commune is situated on the Transylvanian Plateau, at an altitude of 406 m (1,332 ft), on the banks of the river Șieu. It is located in the southern part of Bistrița-Năsăud County, 22 km (14 mi) southeast of the county seat, Bistrița, on the border with Mureș County. Șieu borders the following communes: Cetate to the north, Budacu de Jos to the northwest, Mărișelu to the west, Batoș, Mureș County to the south, and Șieuț to the east. The route of the Via Transilvanica long-distance trail passes through the village of Posmuș.

Historical population
Year	Pop.	±%
2002	3,158	—
2011	2,827	−10.5%
2021	2,932	+3.7%
Source: Census data

At the 2021 census, Șieu had a population of 2,932; of those, 87.72% were Romanians, 7.37% Roma, and 2.08% Hungarians.
