= Doștat =

- Commune
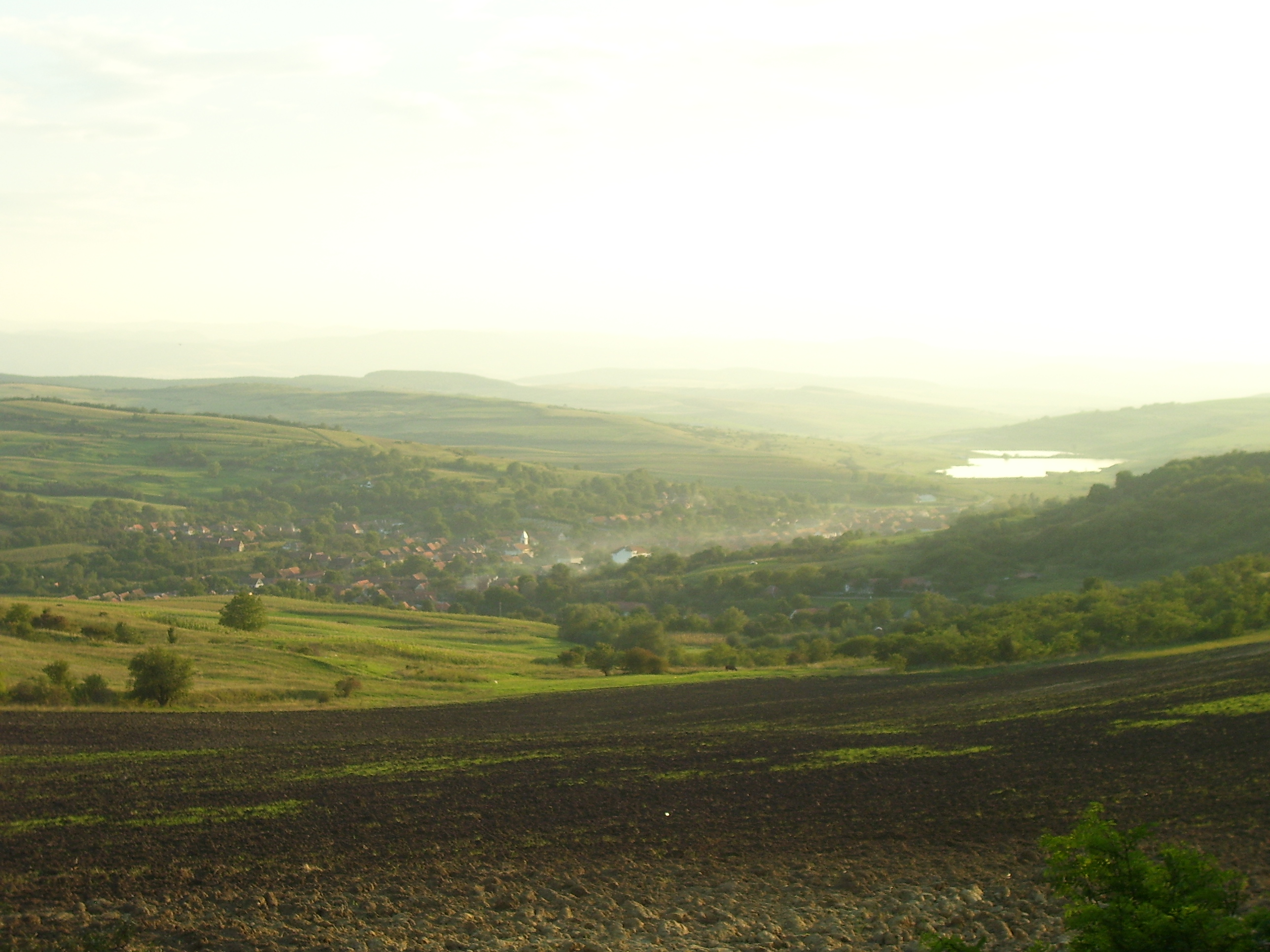

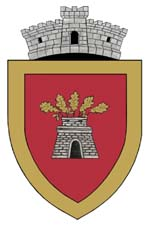
- Coat of arms

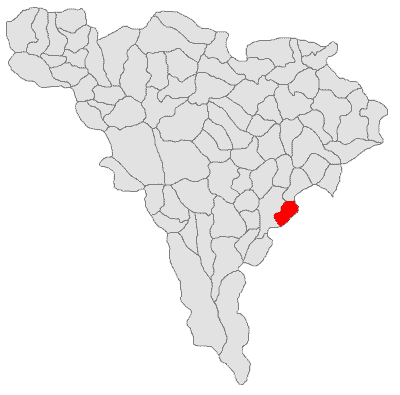
- Location in Alba County

- Location in Romania
- Coordinates: 45°58′N 23°50′E
- Country: Romania
- County: Alba

Government
  - Mayor (2020–2024): Emilia-Livia Cândea (PNL)
- Area: 43.52 km^{2} (16.80 sq mi)
- Elevation: 501 m (1,644 ft)
- Population (2021-12-01): 980
  - Density: 23/km^{2} (58/sq mi)
- Time zone: UTC+02:00 (EET)
  - Summer (DST): UTC+03:00 (EEST)
- Postal code: 517275
- Area code: (+40) 02 58
- Vehicle reg.: AB
- Website: comuna-dostat.ro

Doștat (German: Thorstadt; Hungarian: Hosszútelke) is a commune located in Alba County, Transylvania, Romania. As of 2021, it has a population of 980 and is composed of three villages: Boz, Dealu Doștatului, and Doștat.

The commune is situated in the southeastern part of the county, on the border with Sibiu County. By road, it is at a distance of 26.7 km (16.6 mi) from Sebeș, 41.5 km (25.8 mi) from the county seat, Alba Iulia, and 54.4 km (33.8 mi) from Sibiu.

Doștat borders Roșia de Secaș commune to the north, Șpring commune to the west, Păuca commune to the north-east, Presaca village to the east, Ludoș commune to the southeast, and the town of Miercurea Sibiului to the south.

Historical population
Year	Pop.	±%
1850	1,642	—
1900	2,160	+31.5%
1930	2,748	+27.2%
1966	2,193	−20.2%
2002	1,072	−51.1%
2011	956	−10.8%
2021	980	+2.5%
Source: INS, Census data

== Villages ==
=== Boz ===
Boz (German: Bußd or Bussd, Hungarian: Buzd) is a village in the Doștat commune. The name means elder bush in Romanian. The first document that mentions the village is from 1290. In 1786 there were 571 inhabitants recorded, in 1936 there were 1,013 inhabitants, from which 342 Transylvanian Saxons.

In 1992, after almost all ethnic Germans emigrated (mainly to Germany), there remained only 371 inhabitants.

Boz is the birthplace of the Lutheran priest Mathias Schuster (1912–1997), who founded the village Rosenau in Seewalchen commune in Austria, as a refuge place for the German population (Saxons and Lander) from Transylvania and other parts of Central and Eastern Europe who had to flee after World War II in order to escape the communist deportation to the Soviet Union and imprisonment.

During the war, on their way to the Russian front, being enrolled in the German army (as Waffen SS), the men from Bussd wrote on the walls of the train in their home dialect: "Holt Dich, Stalin, un der Grunn, denn de Bussder kunn", "Tremble for your moustache, Stalin, 'couse the people from Bussd are coming!" .

A meaningful joke about Bussd can be found in a German newspaper: In the train from Kronstadt to Vienna, a peasant from Bussd is sitting next to a merchant from Vienna, who was continuously rhapsodizing about his beautiful city. Because the peasant wasn't paying any attention, the merchant asked him: So tell me, you really haven't been in Vienna before? The peasant then answered drily: Well, have you ever been in Bussd?

== Gallery ==
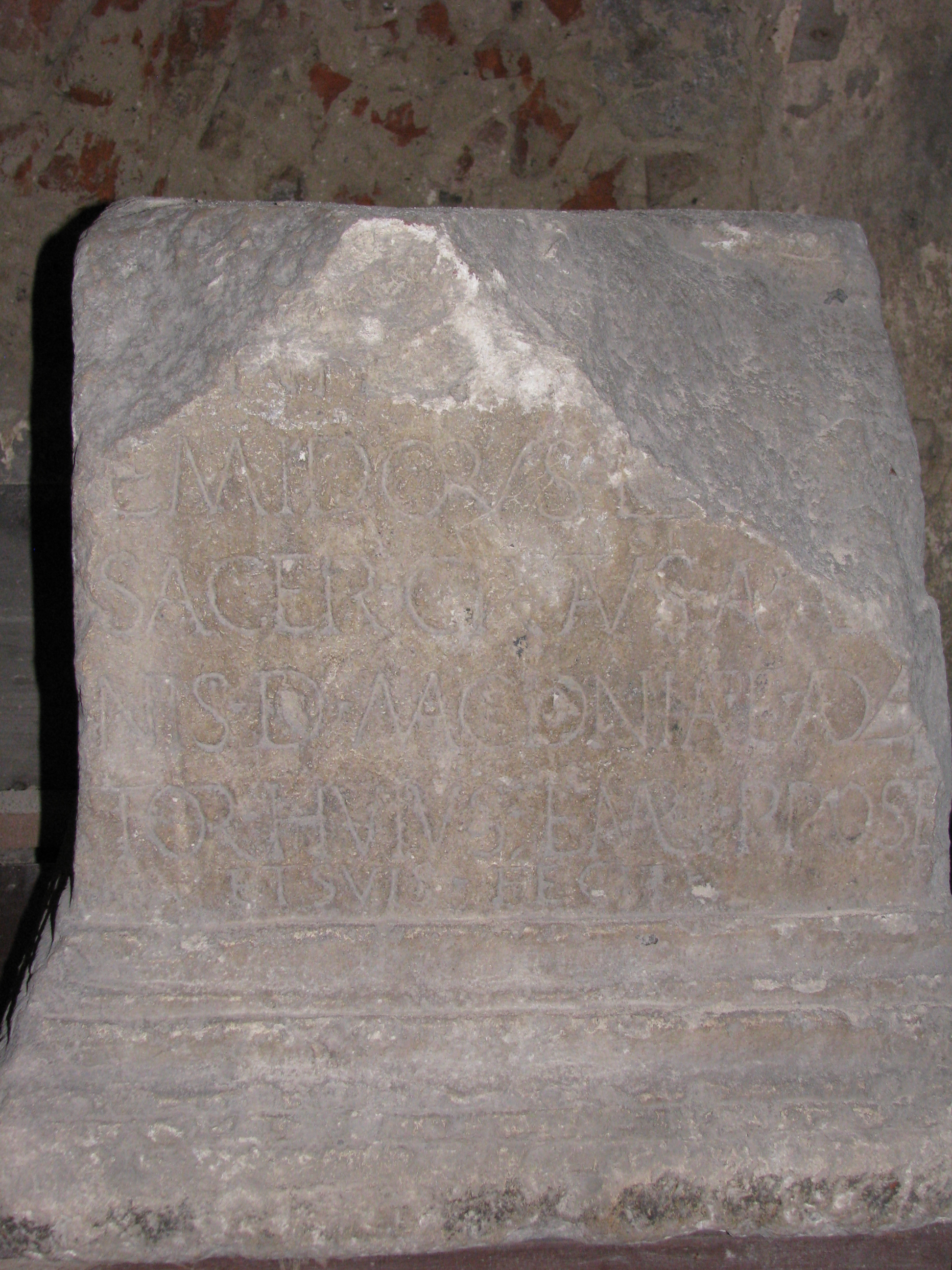
Roman votive altar with inscription from Roman Dacia (c. 101–250 AD), found at Doștat

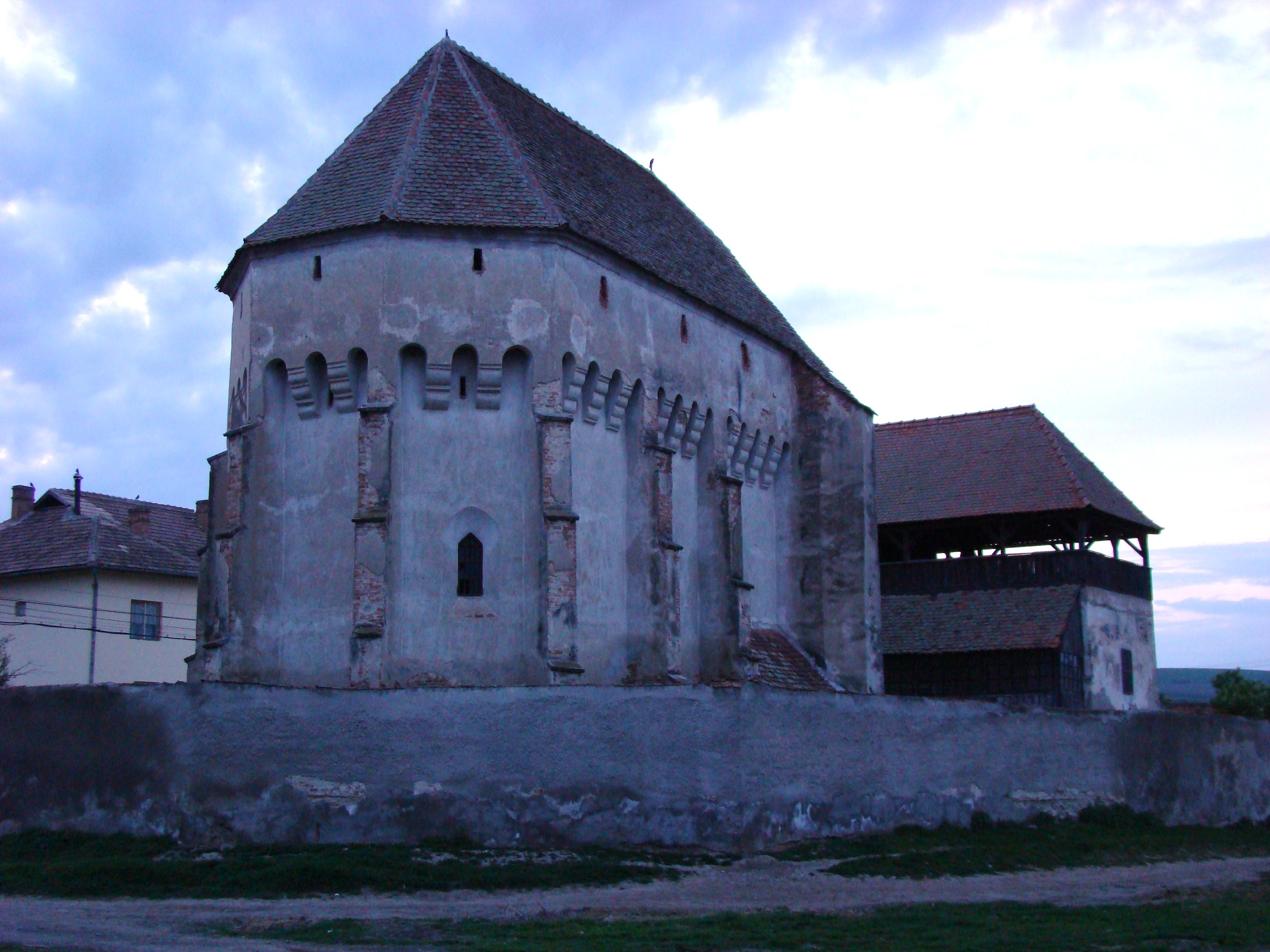
The Fortified Evangelical Church of Boz, built 1523

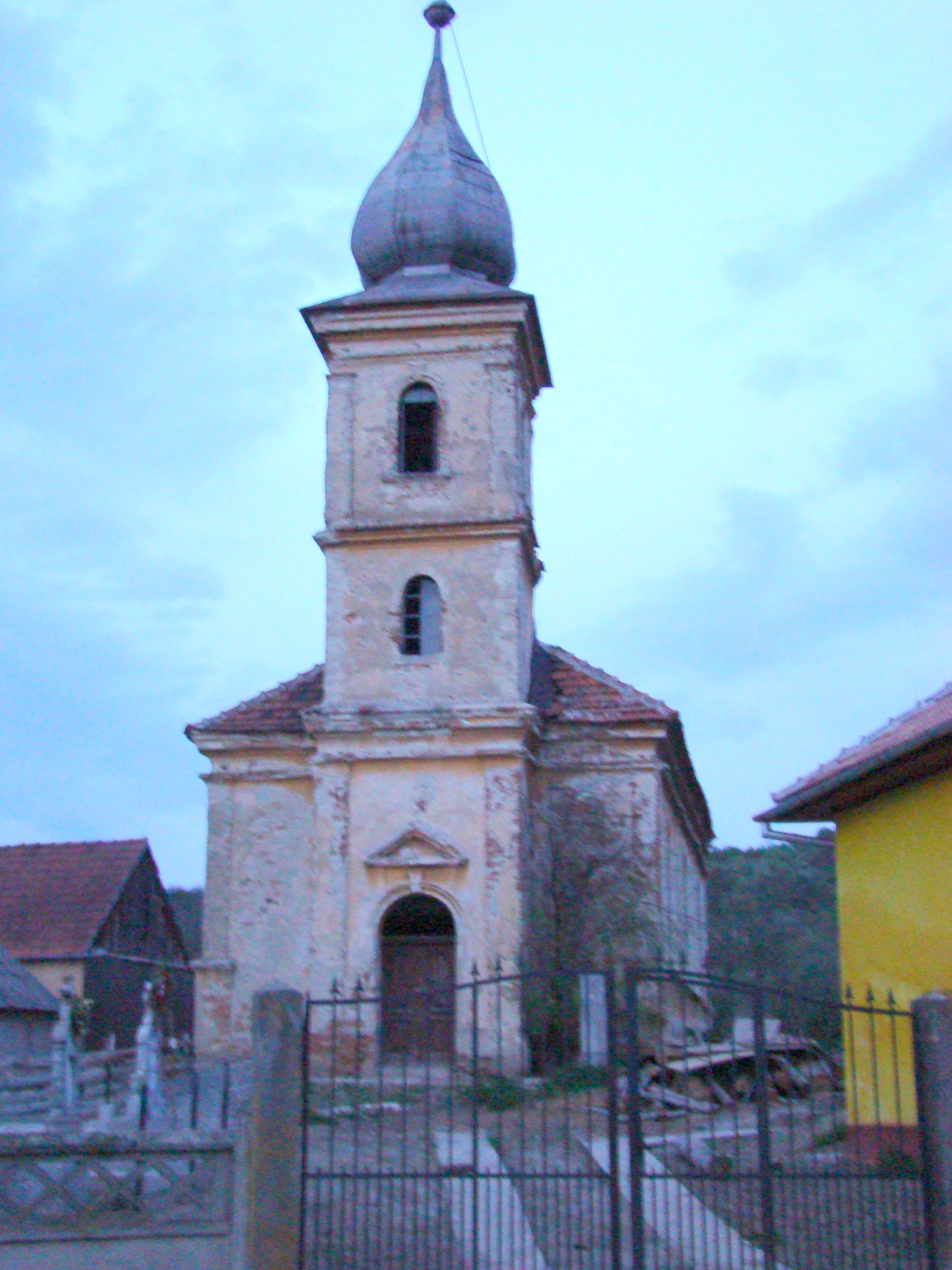
The Unitarian Church of Boz

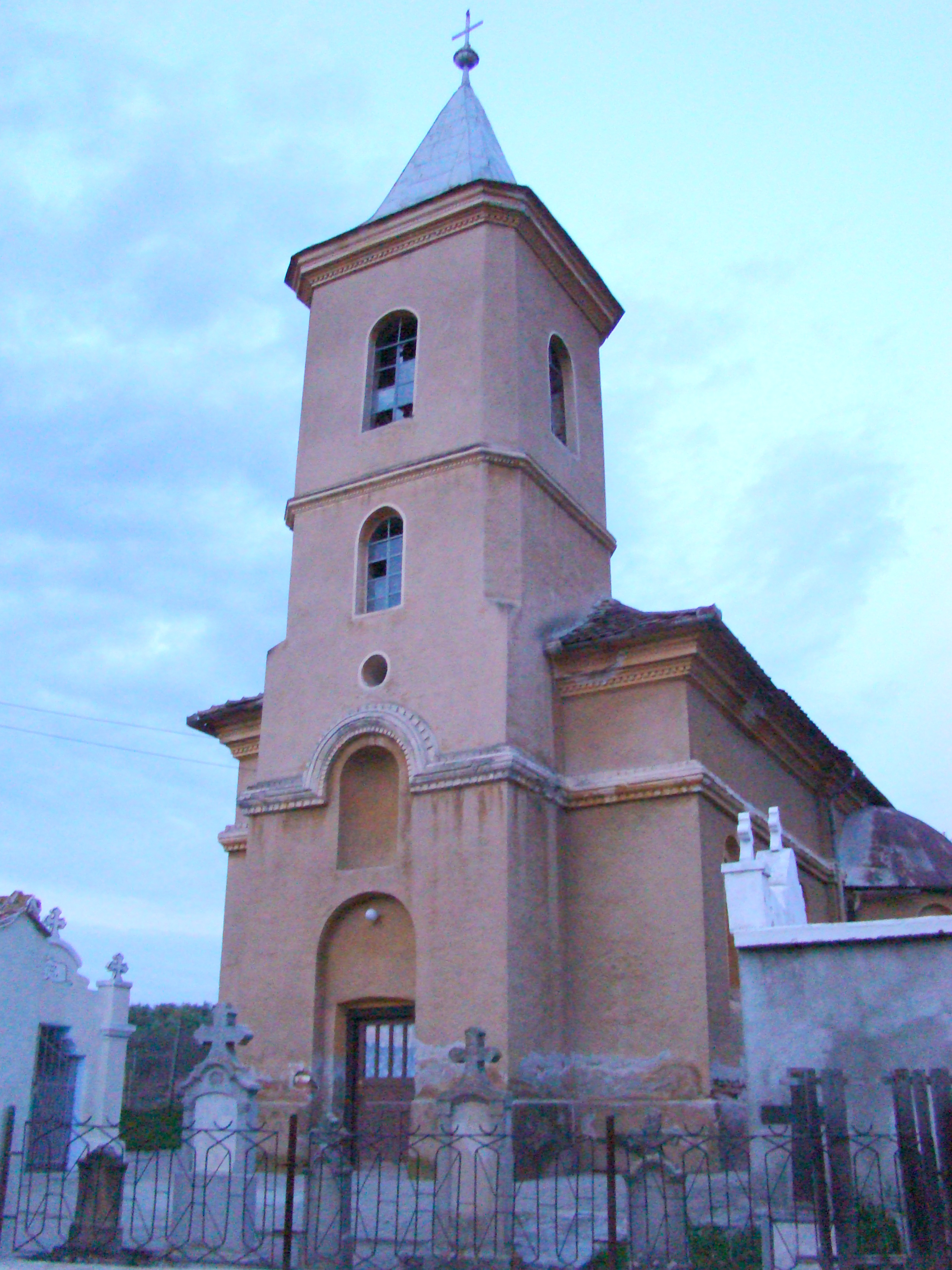
The Orthodox Church of Boz

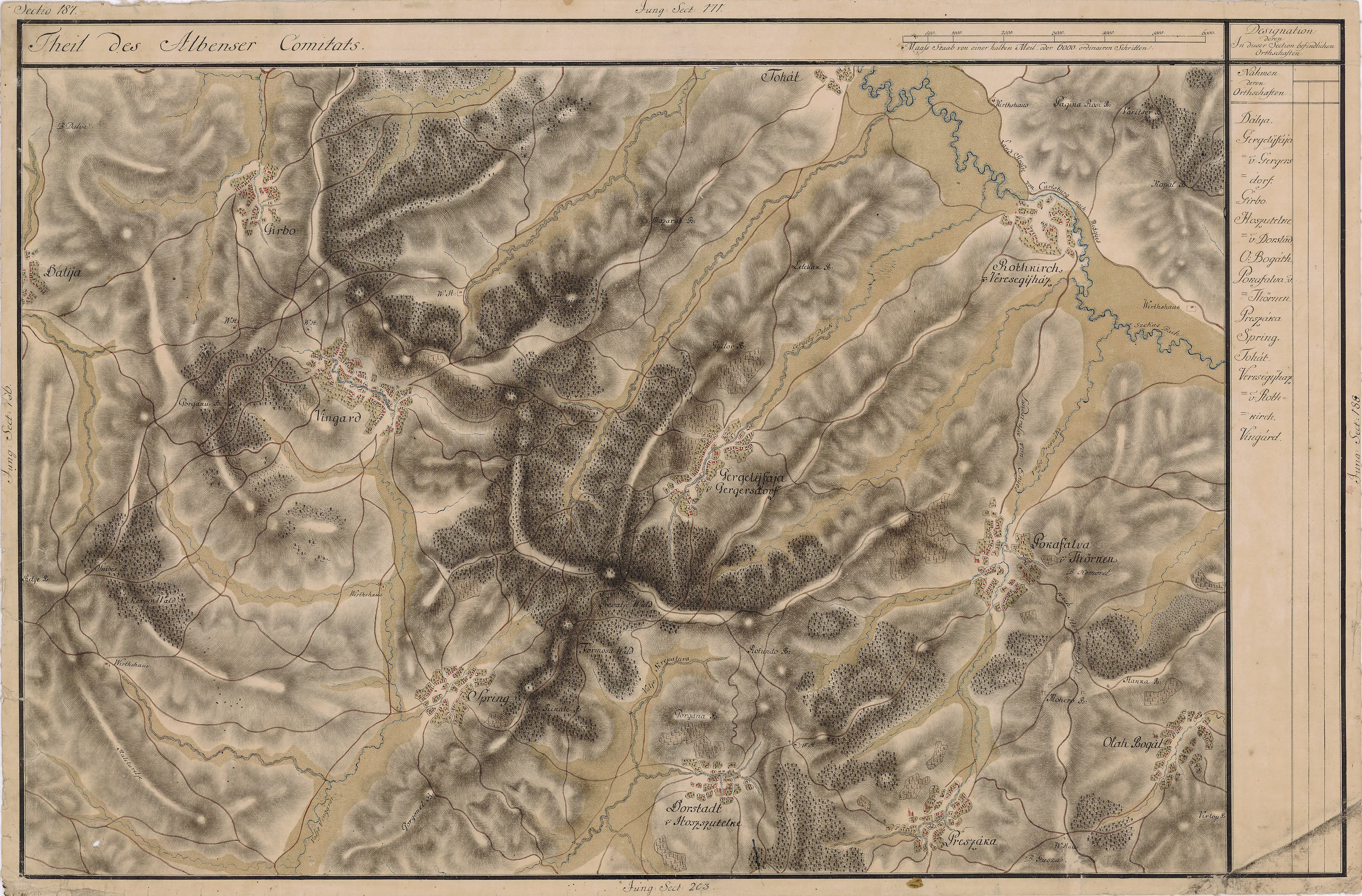
Doștat on the Josephine Topographic Surveys of Transylvania, 1769–1773

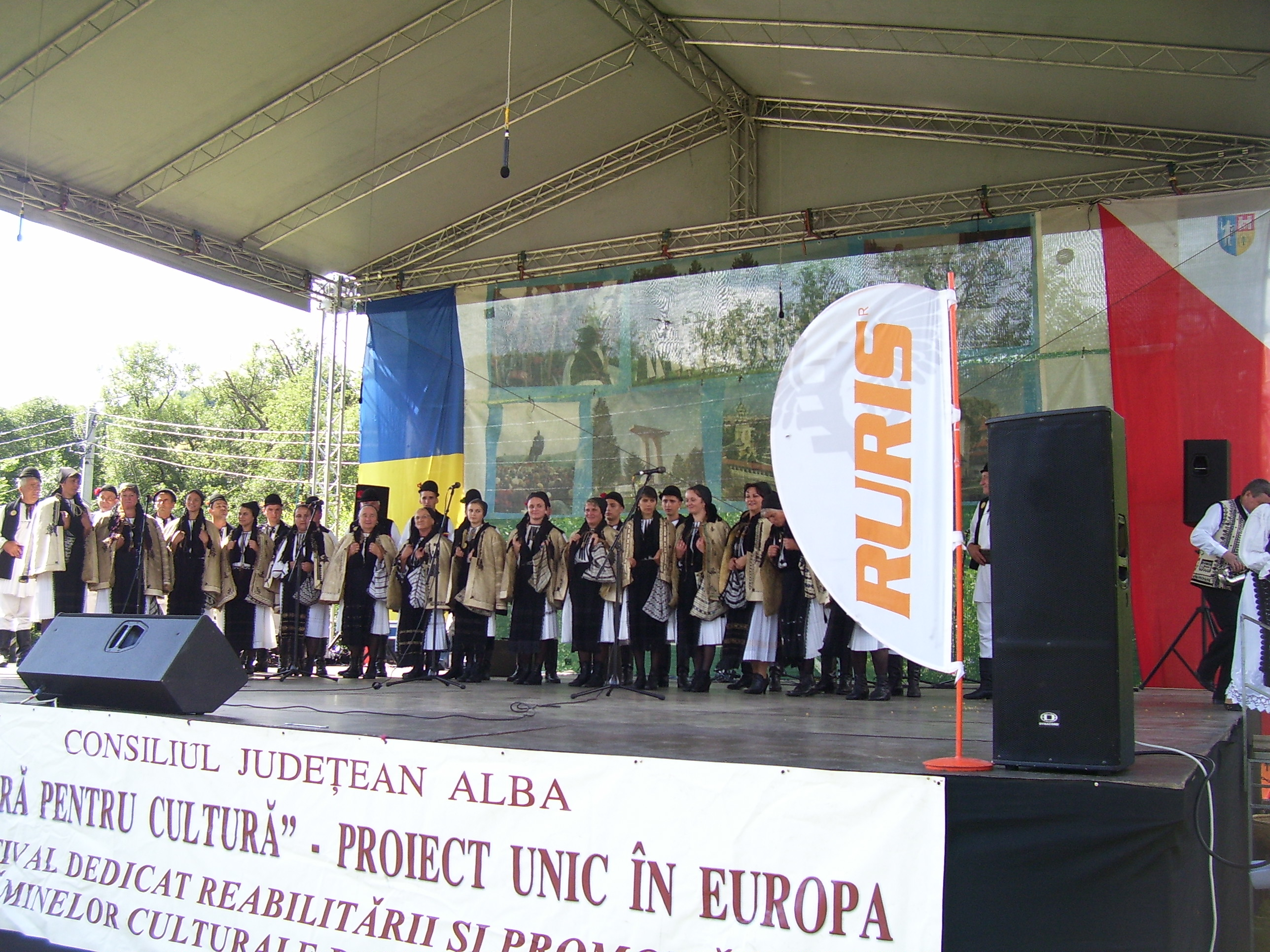
Local folklore group

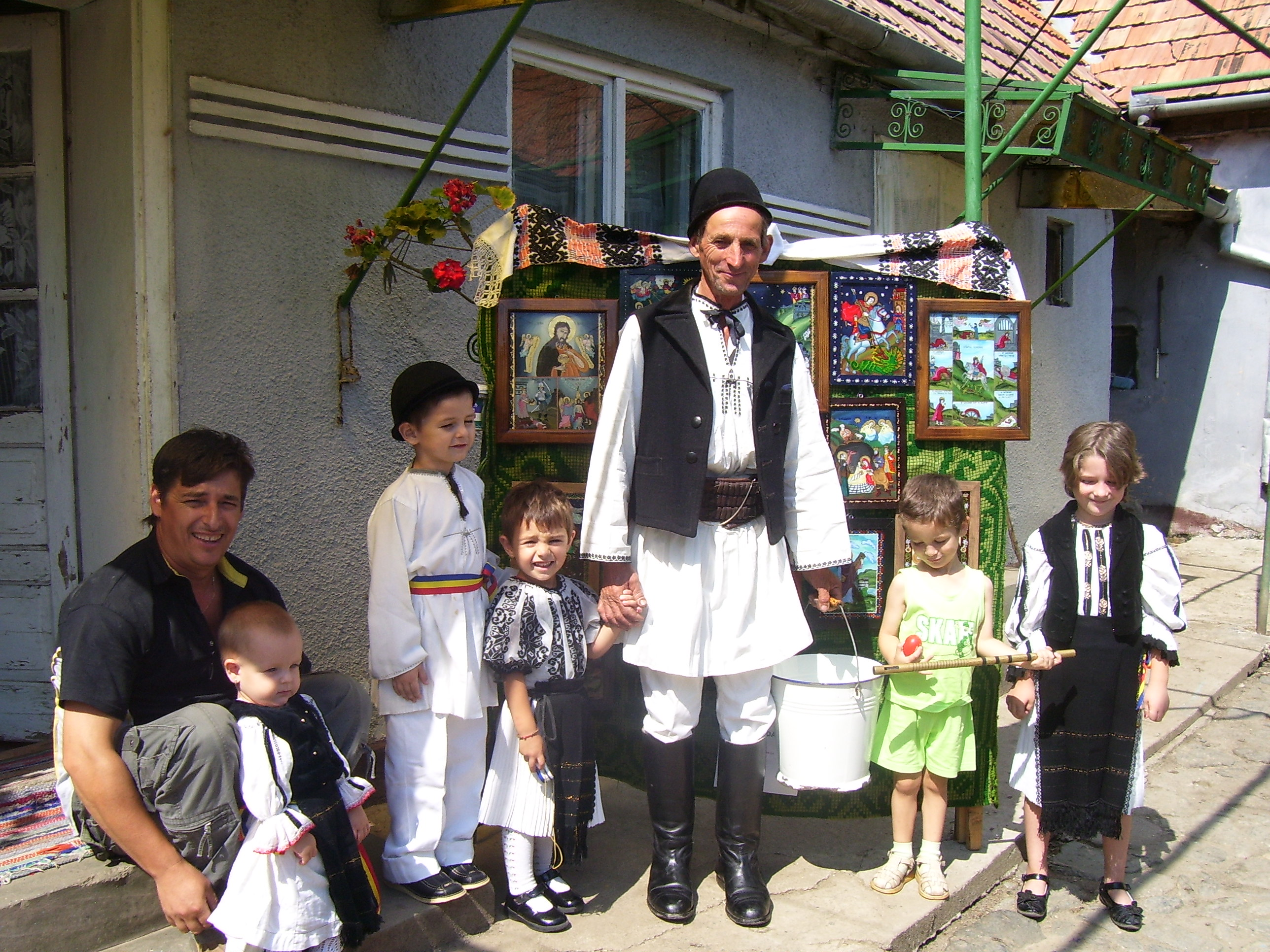
Local costumes

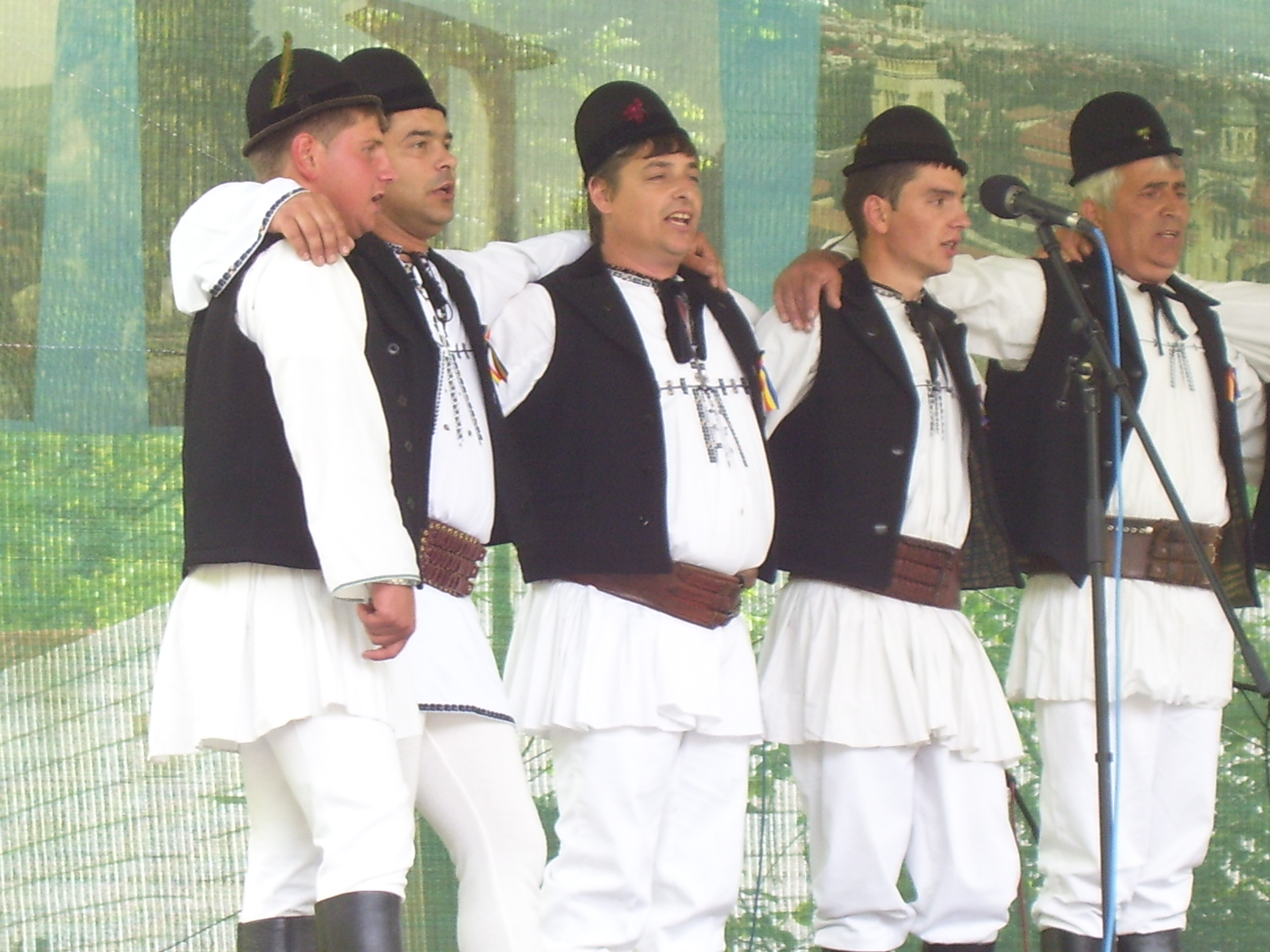
Local folklore group
