= Dudești =

Dudeşti may refer to:

- Dudeşti culture, an archeological culture of the 6th millennium BC
- Dudești, Bucharest
- Dudești, Brăila, a commune in Brăila County
- Dudeşti, a village in Luncoiu de Jos Commune, Hunedoara County
- Dudeștii Noi, a commune in Timiș County, Romania
- Dudeștii Vechi, a commune in Timiș County, Romania

== See also ==
- Duda (disambiguation)
