= Luncoiu =

- Location within Romania

Location
- Country: Romania
- Counties: Hunedoara County
- Villages: Luncoiu de Sus, Luncoiu de Jos, Brad

Physical characteristics
- Source: Bihor Mountains
- Mouth: Crișul Alb
  - coordinates: 46.1295°N 22.7940°E
- Length: 11 km (6.8 mi)
- Basin size: 67 km^{2} (26 sq mi)

Basin features
- Progression: Crișul Alb→ Körös→ Tisza→ Danube→ Black Sea
- Tributaries
  - left: Valea Lungă
  - right: Ruda

The Luncoiu is a left tributary of the river Crișul Alb in Romania. It discharges into the Crișul Alb in Brad. Its length is 11 km (6.8 mi) and its basin size is 67 km^{2} (26 sq mi).
