= Ioan Nagy =

Romanian footballer

Personal information
- Date of birth: 8 November 1954 (age 71)
- Place of birth: Corvinești, Romania
- Position: Centre back

Senior career*
Years	Team	Apps	(Gls)
1972–1990	FCM Brașov	403	(9)

Managerial career
- 1990–1991: FC Brașov
- 1994: FC Brașov
- 2011–2012: FC Brașov (assistant)
- 2012: ASA Târgu Mureș (assistant)
- 2012–2013: FC Brașov (assistant)
- 2013–2014: Politehnica Iași (assistant)
- 2020–2022: SR Brașov (technical director)
- 2022: SR Brașov
- 2022–2025: SR Brașov (technical director)
- 2025–: CSM Săcele (technical director)
- * Club domestic league appearances and goals

Ioan Nagy (also known as Ioan Naghi; born 8 November 1954) is a Romanian former football defender.

== Career ==
He made his debut as a player in the yellow-and-black shirt alongside titans such as Pescaru, Adamache and Gyorffy, and over the years went on to become one of the great figures of "Steagul" himself.

He remained loyal to the team even after the relegation in 1975, being one of the key players in the remarkable 1979 Cupa României campaign, when he scored in the round of 16 against Slatina and converted the decisive penalty in the quarter-finals against Craiova.

In 1980, he returned to the top flight in style and was awarded the captain’s armband following Pescaru's retirement. As captain, he led the team to the Romanian Cup semi-finals for the second time in his career (1987). He retired three years later, at the end of the season in which the club narrowly missed qualification for the European competitions.

== Honours ==
FCM Brașov

- Divizia B: 1979–80, 1983–84
