= Matei, Bistrița-Năsăud =

Matei Szentmáté
- Commune
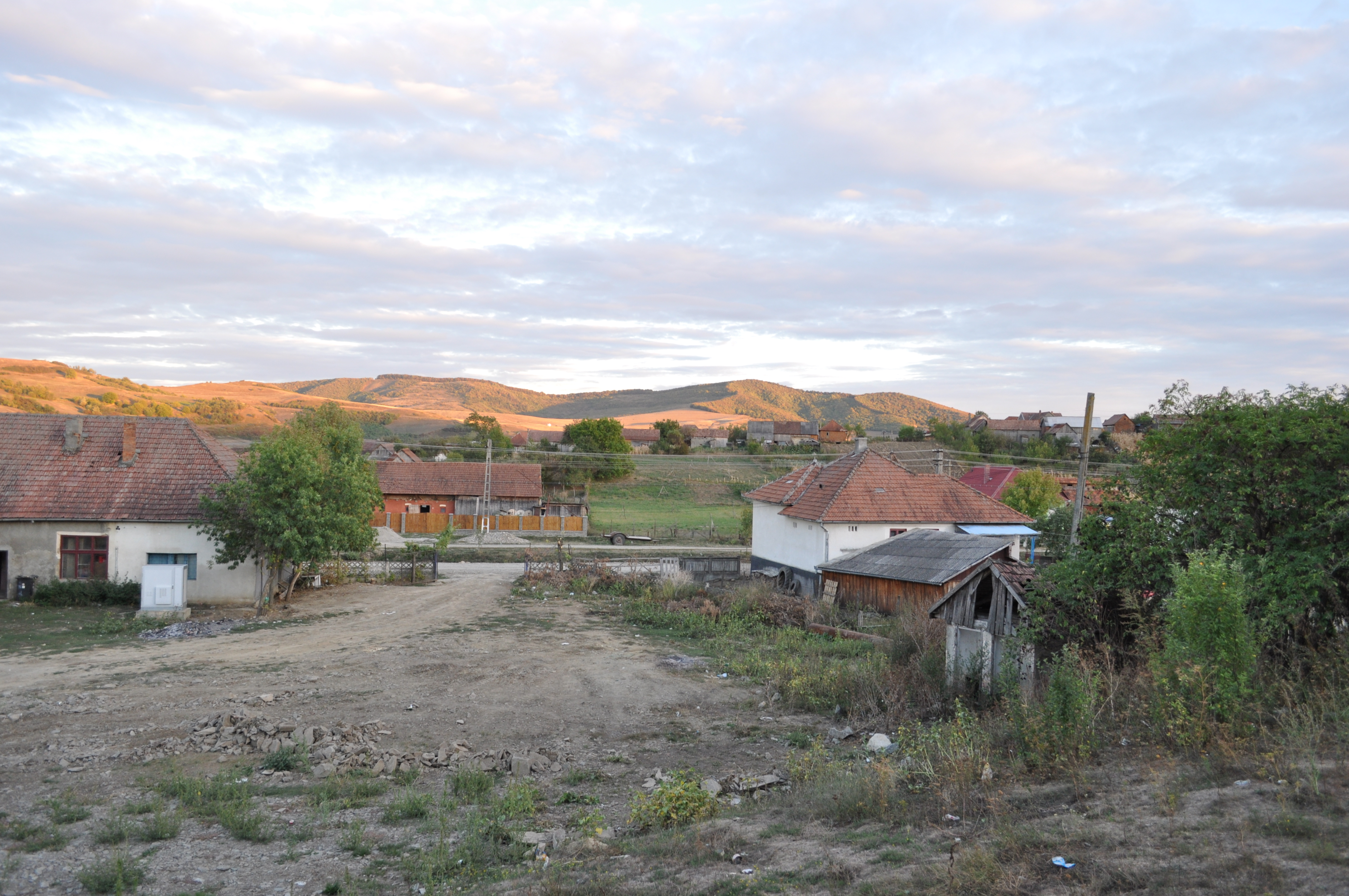
- View of Corvinești village

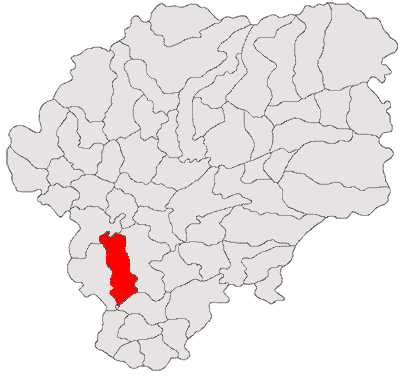
- Location in Bistrița-Năsăud County

- Location in Romania
- Coordinates: 46°59′N 24°16′E
- Country: Romania
- County: Bistrița-Năsăud

Government
  - Mayor (2020–2024): Vasile Encian (PNL)
- Area: 86.02 km^{2} (33.21 sq mi)
- Elevation: 330 m (1,080 ft)
- Population (2021-12-01): 2,332
  - Density: 27.11/km^{2} (70.21/sq mi)
- Time zone: UTC+02:00 (EET)
  - Summer (DST): UTC+03:00 (EEST)
- Postal code: 427135
- Area code: +40 x59
- Vehicle reg.: BN
- Website: comunamatei.ro

Matei (Hungarian: Szentmáté; German: Mathesdorf) is a commune in Bistrița-Năsăud County, Transylvania, Romania.

It is composed of six villages: Bidiu (formerly Bidin; Bödön; German: Bedendorf, Betendorf, Bidda), Corvinești (formerly Uifalău; Kékesújfalu; German: Niederneudorf), Enciu (Szászencs, Encs; German: Entsch or Intsch), Fântânele (Újős, Szászújős; German: Eisch or Neuösch or Erbdorf)), Matei, and Moruț (Aranyosmóric, Szászmóric, Szász-Móricz, Móric; German: Moritzdorf or Mauritz).

== Geography ==
The commune lies on the Transylvanian Plateau, in the Nösnerland historic region of northeastern Transylvania. It is located in the southern part of Bistrița-Năsăud County, at a distance of 27 km (17 mi) from the town of Beclean and 34 km (21 mi) from the county seat, Bistrița; the city of Gherla is 38 km (24 mi) to the west, in Cluj County.

== Demographics ==
At the 2011 census, 52.3% of inhabitants were Romanians, 40.6% Hungarians, 5.8% Roma, and 1.2% Germans. At the 2021 census, Matei commune had a population of 2,332, of which 51.84% were Romanians, 36.49% Hungarians, and 3.56% Roma.

== Natives ==
- Ioan Nagy (born 1954), footballer
