= Zagăr =

- Commune
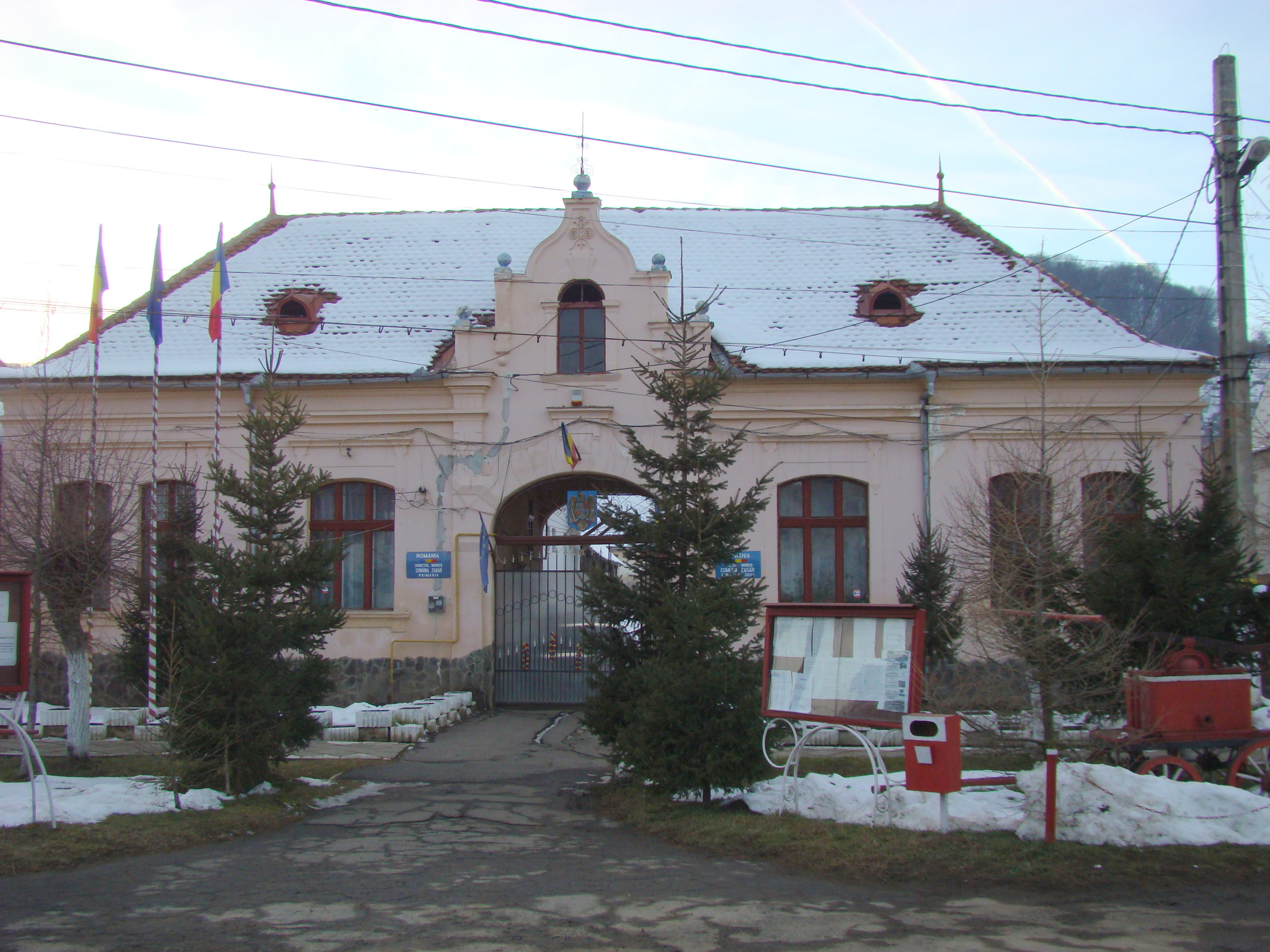
- Zagăr townhall

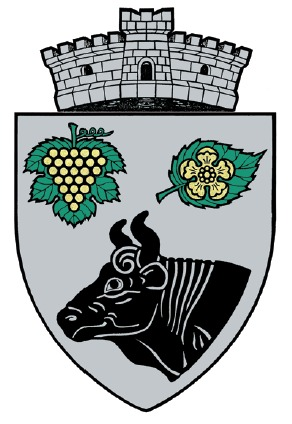
- Coat of arms

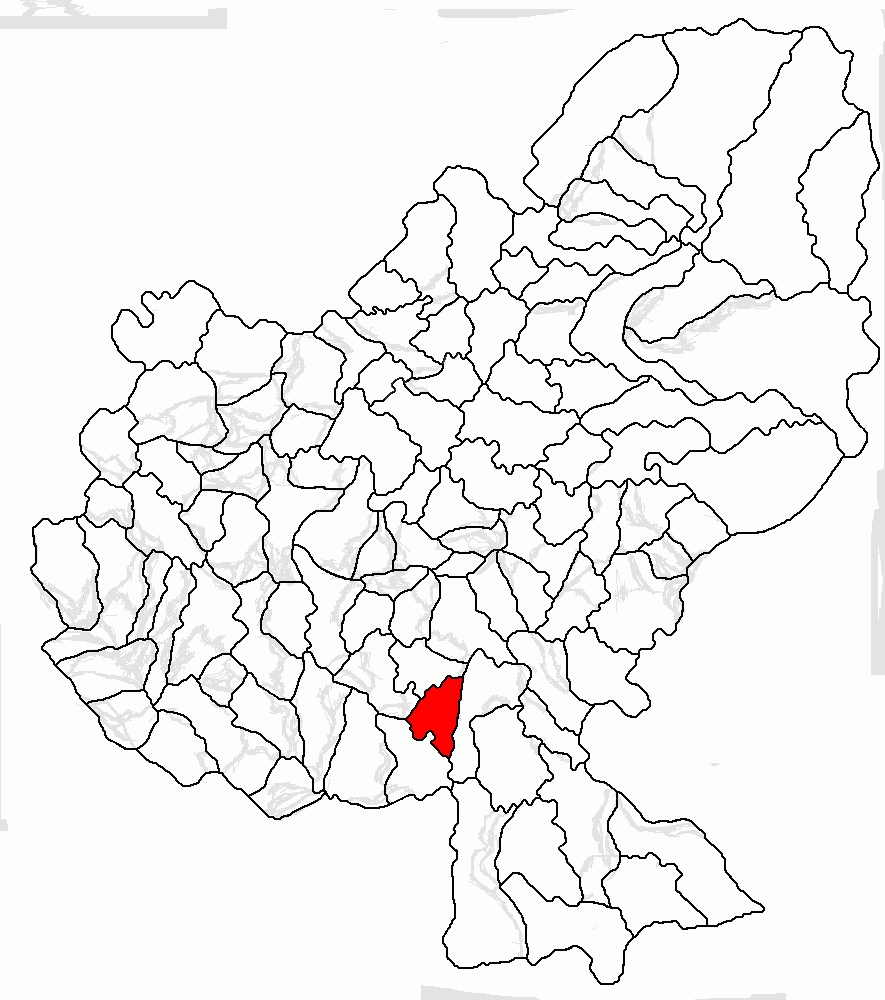
- Location in Mureș County

- Location in Romania
- Coordinates: 46°21′N 24°37′E
- Country: Romania
- County: Mureș

Government
  - Mayor (2020–2024): Claudiu Pătrușel (PSD)
- Area: 39.02 km^{2} (15.07 sq mi)
- Elevation: 349 m (1,145 ft)
- Population (2021-12-01): 1,080
  - Density: 27.7/km^{2} (71.7/sq mi)
- Time zone: UTC+02:00 (EET)
  - Summer (DST): UTC+03:00 (EEST)
- Postal code: 547655
- Area code: (+40) 0265
- Vehicle reg.: MS
- Website: www.primariazagar.ro

Zagăr (German: Rode; Hungarian: Zágor, Hungarian pronunciation: [ˈzaːɡor]) is a commune in Mureș County, Transylvania, Romania that is composed of two villages, Seleuș (Klein-Alisch; Szászszőllős) and Zagăr.

At the 2002 census, Zagăr had a population of 1,208, consisting of 60% Romanians, 35% Roma, 3% Hungarians, and 2% Germans. At the 2021 census, the commune had a population of 1,080; of those, 49.44% were Roma, 40.09 Romanians, and 1.76% Hungarians.
