= Mihăileni, Sibiu =

Mihăileni
- Commune
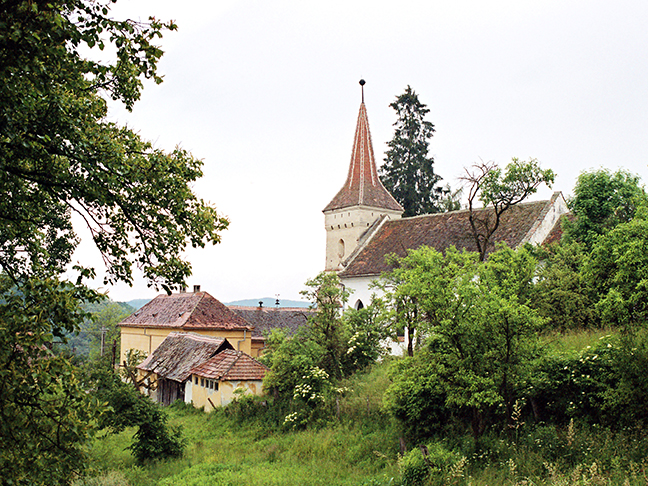
- Fortified church of Metiș

- Coat of arms

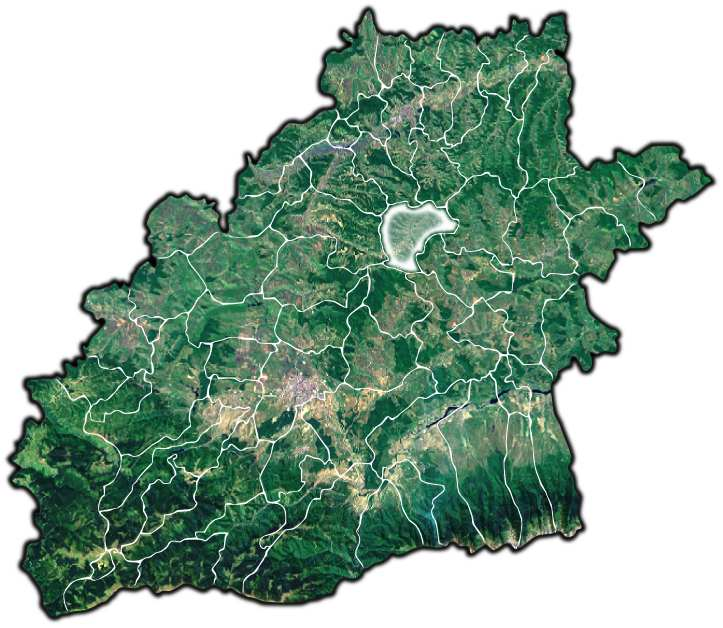
- Location in Sibiu County

- Location in Romania
- Coordinates: 45.9889°N 24.3472°E
- Country: Romania
- County: Sibiu

Government
  - Mayor (2024–2028): Cristian Ioan Bratu (ADU)
- Area: 77.4 km^{2} (29.9 sq mi)
- Elevation: 399 m (1,309 ft)
- Population (2021-12-01): 973
  - Density: 12.6/km^{2} (32.6/sq mi)
- Time zone: UTC+02:00 (EET)
  - Summer (DST): UTC+03:00 (EEST)
- Postal code: 557155
- Area code: +(40) 0269
- Vehicle reg.: SB
- Website: comunamihailenisb.ro

Mihăileni (German: Schaldorf, Hungarian: Sálfalva) is a commune located in Sibiu County, Transylvania, Romania. It is composed of five villages: Metiș (Martinsdorf, Mártonfalva), Mihăileni, Moardăș (Mardisch, Mardos), Răvășel (Rosch, Rovás), and Șalcău (Schalko, Salkó). Metiș and Moardăș have fortified churches.
