= Nadeș =

- Commune
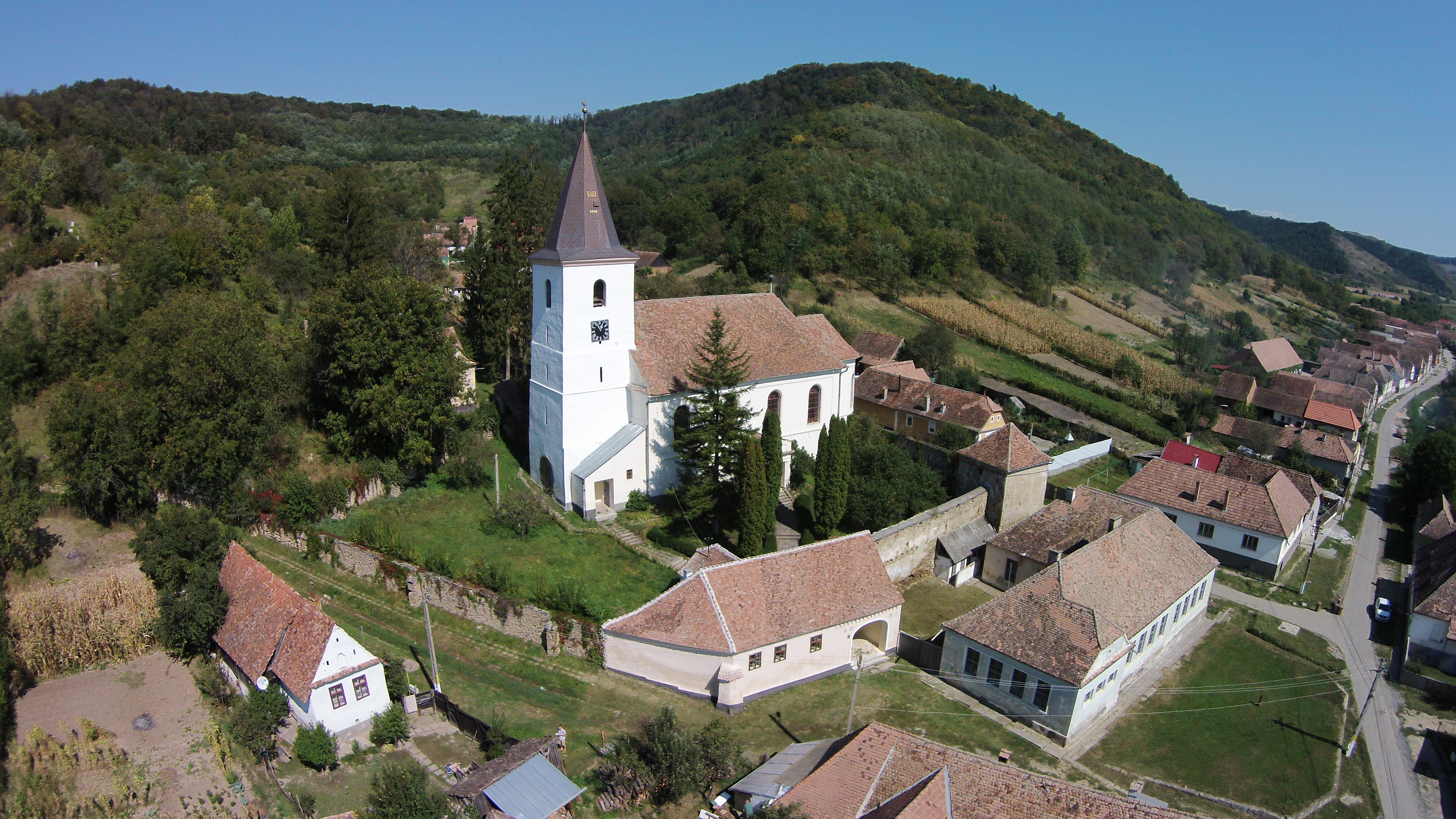
- Lutheran church in Nadeș

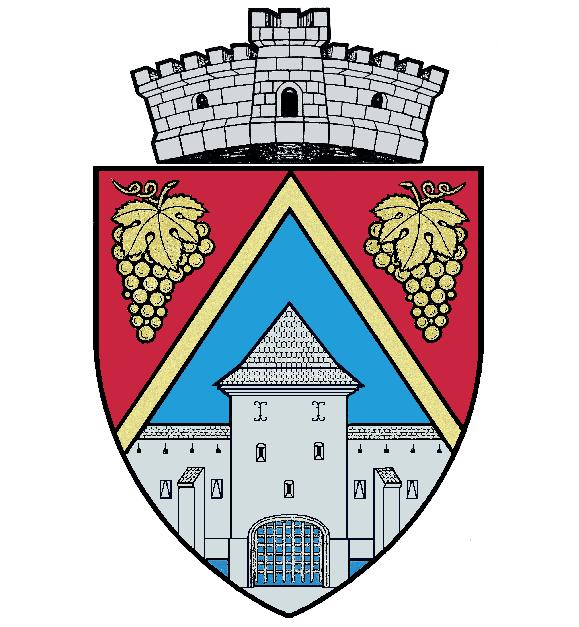
- Coat of arms

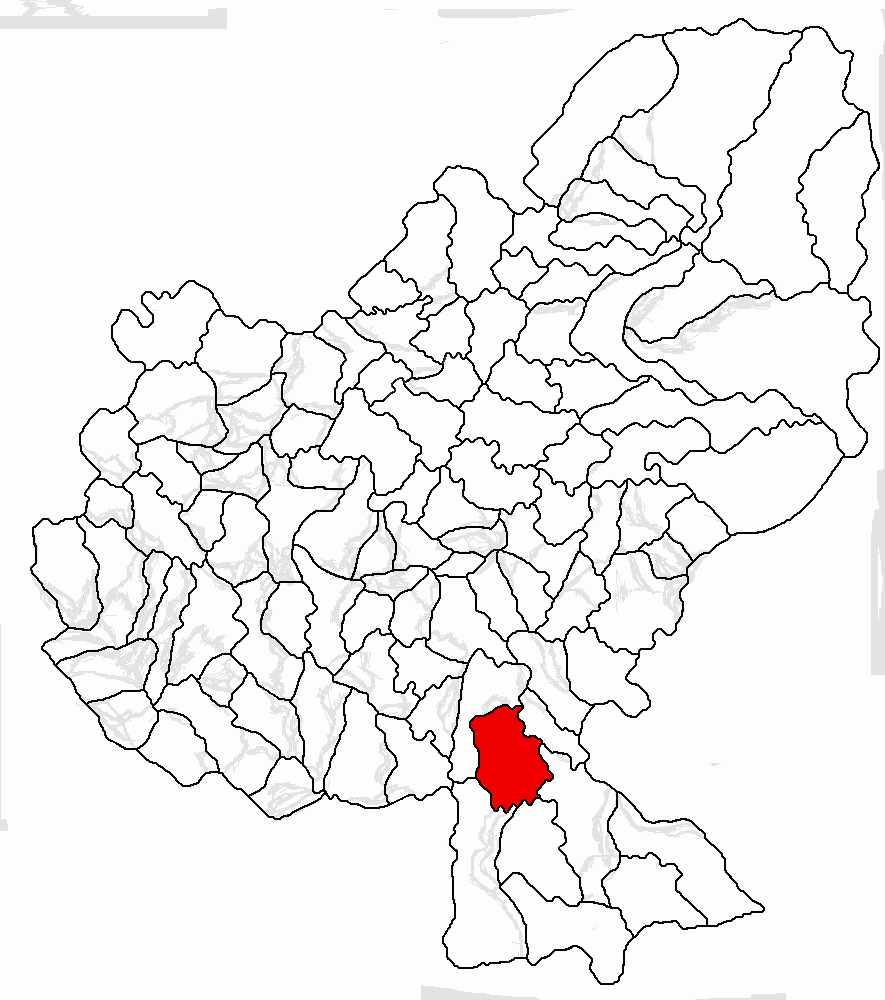
- Location in Mureș County

- Location in Romania
- Coordinates: 46°19′17″N 24°43′9″E
- Country: Romania
- County: Mureș

Government
  - Mayor (2024–2028): Alexandru Grigore Sînpetrean (PSD)
- Area: 68.76 km^{2} (26.55 sq mi)
- Elevation: 368 m (1,207 ft)
- Population (2021-12-01): 2,864
  - Density: 41.65/km^{2} (107.9/sq mi)
- Time zone: UTC+02:00 (EET)
  - Summer (DST): UTC+03:00 (EEST)
- Postal code: 547430
- Area code: (+40) 0265
- Vehicle reg.: MS
- Website: www.nades.ro/ro

Nadeș (Hungarian: Szásznádas, Hungarian pronunciation: [ˈsaːsnaːdɒʃ]; German: Nadesch) is a commune in Mureș County, Transylvania, Romania. It is composed of four villages: Măgheruș (Küküllőmagyarós; German: Maniersch), Nadeș, Pipea (Pipe; German: Wepeschdorf), and Țigmandru (Cikmántor; German: Zuckmantel).

At the 2021 census, the commune had a population of 2,864; of those, 59.71% were Romanians, 20.98% Roma, 14.66% Hungarians, and 1.22% Germans.

The Nadeș gas field is located on the administrative territory of the commune.

== See also ==
- List of Hungarian exonyms (Mureș County)
