= Suseni, Mureș =

Suseni Marosfelfalu
- Commune
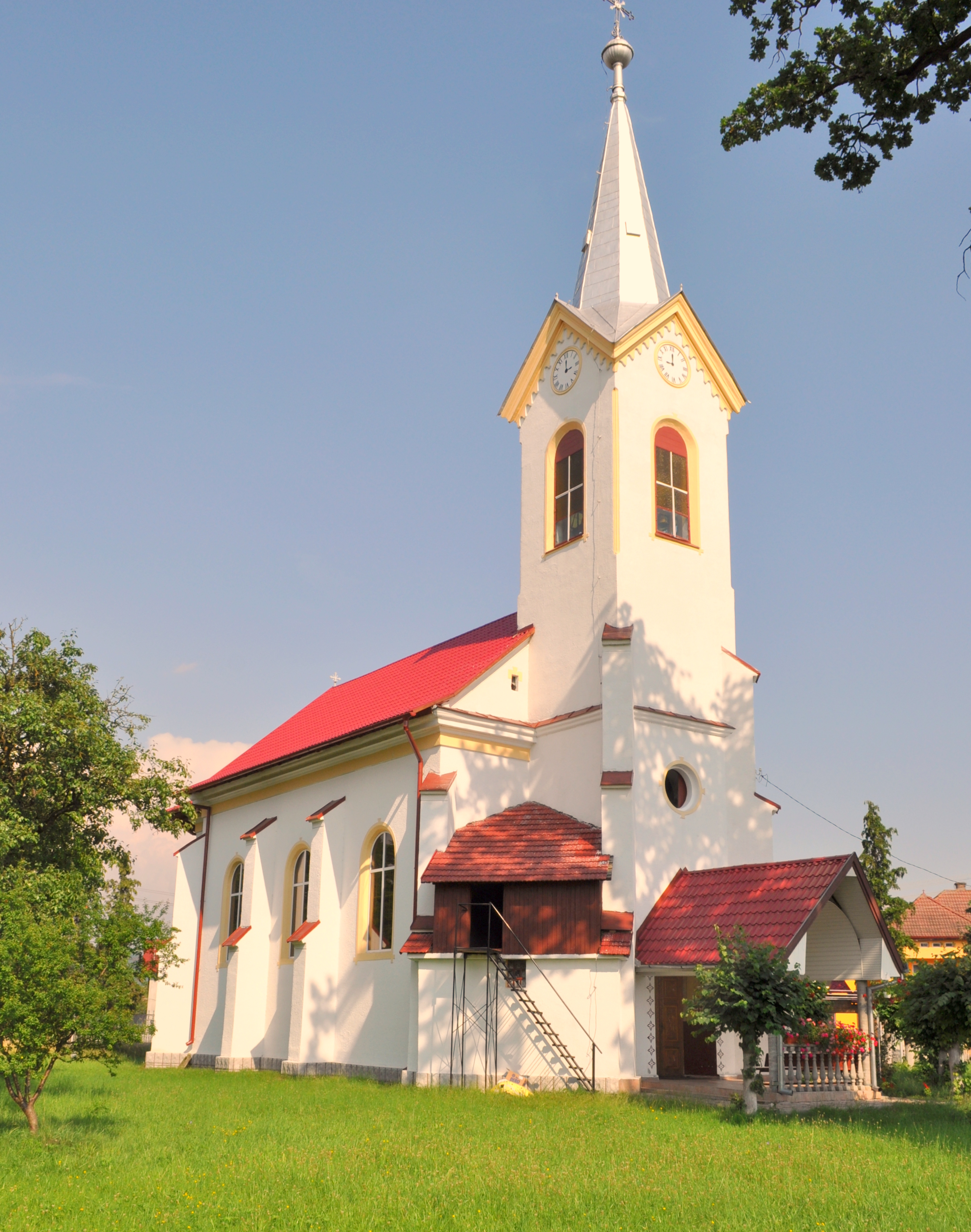
- Catholic church in Suseni

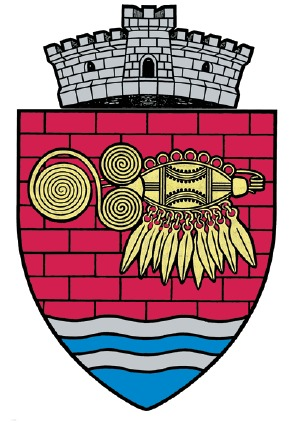
- Coat of arms

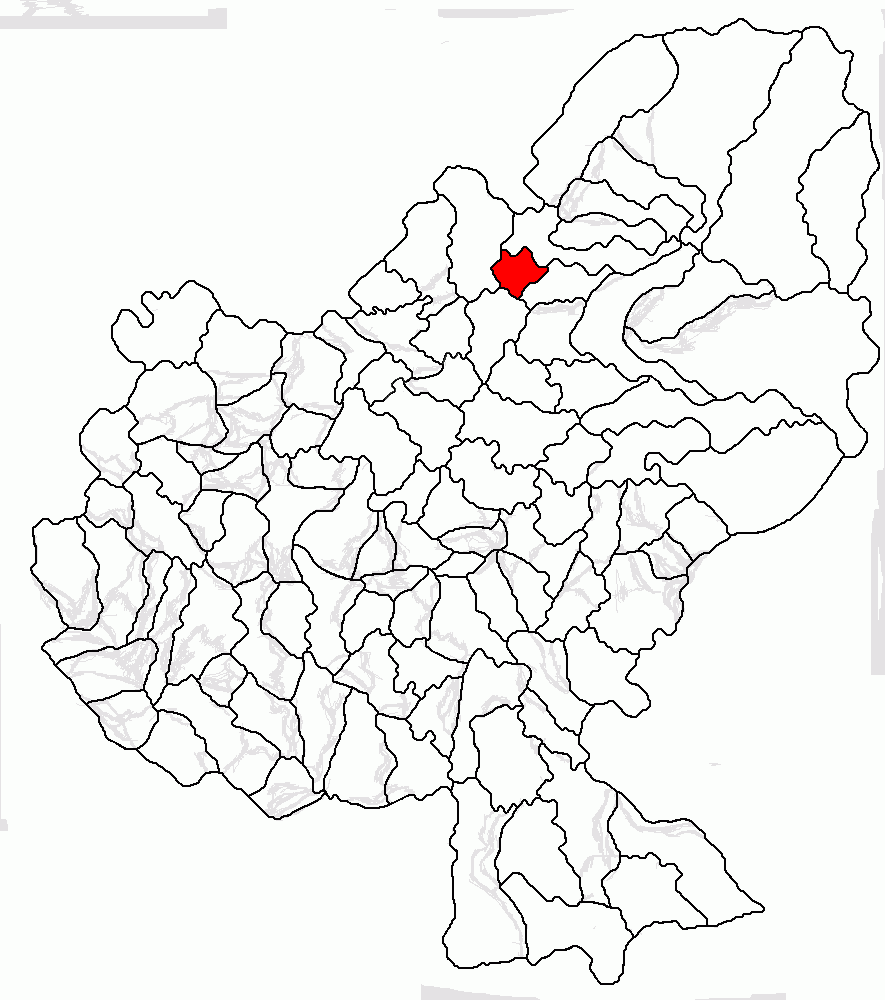
- Location in Mureș County

- Location in Romania
- Coordinates: 46°49′N 24°44′E
- Country: Romania
- County: Mureș

Government
  - Mayor (2020–2024): Mircea Mariș (PNL)
- Area: 30.73 km^{2} (11.86 sq mi)
- Elevation: 380 m (1,250 ft)
- Population (2021-12-01): 2,357
  - Density: 76.70/km^{2} (198.7/sq mi)
- Time zone: UTC+02:00 (EET)
  - Summer (DST): UTC+03:00 (EEST)
- Postal code: 547585
- Area code: +(40) x65
- Vehicle reg.: MS
- Website: primariacomuneisuseni.ro

Suseni (Hungarian: Marosfelfalu, Hungarian pronunciation: [ˈmɒroʃfɛlfɒlu]; Transylvanian Saxon: Pränzdorf; German: Oberdorf, literally 'Upperbourg') is a commune in Mureș County, Transylvania, Romania that is composed of two villages, Luieriu (Lövér) and Suseni.

The commune is situated on the Transylvanian Plateau, at an altitude of 380 m (1,250 ft), on the banks of the Mureș River. It is located in the northern part of Mureș County, 6 km (3.7 mi) from the town of Reghin and 38 km (24 mi) from the county seat, Târgu Mureș.

At the 2002 census, Suseni had a population of 2,319: 62% Romanians, 29% Hungarians, and 9% Roma. At the 2011 census, there were 2,253 inhabitants, of which 57.21% were Romanians, 26.85% Hungarians, and 12.29% Roma. At the 2021 census, the commune had a population of 2,357; of those, 63.09% were Romanians, 23.17% Hungarians, and 10.48% Roma.

== See also ==
- List of Hungarian exonyms (Mureș County)
