= Racovița, Sibiu =

Racovița
- Commune
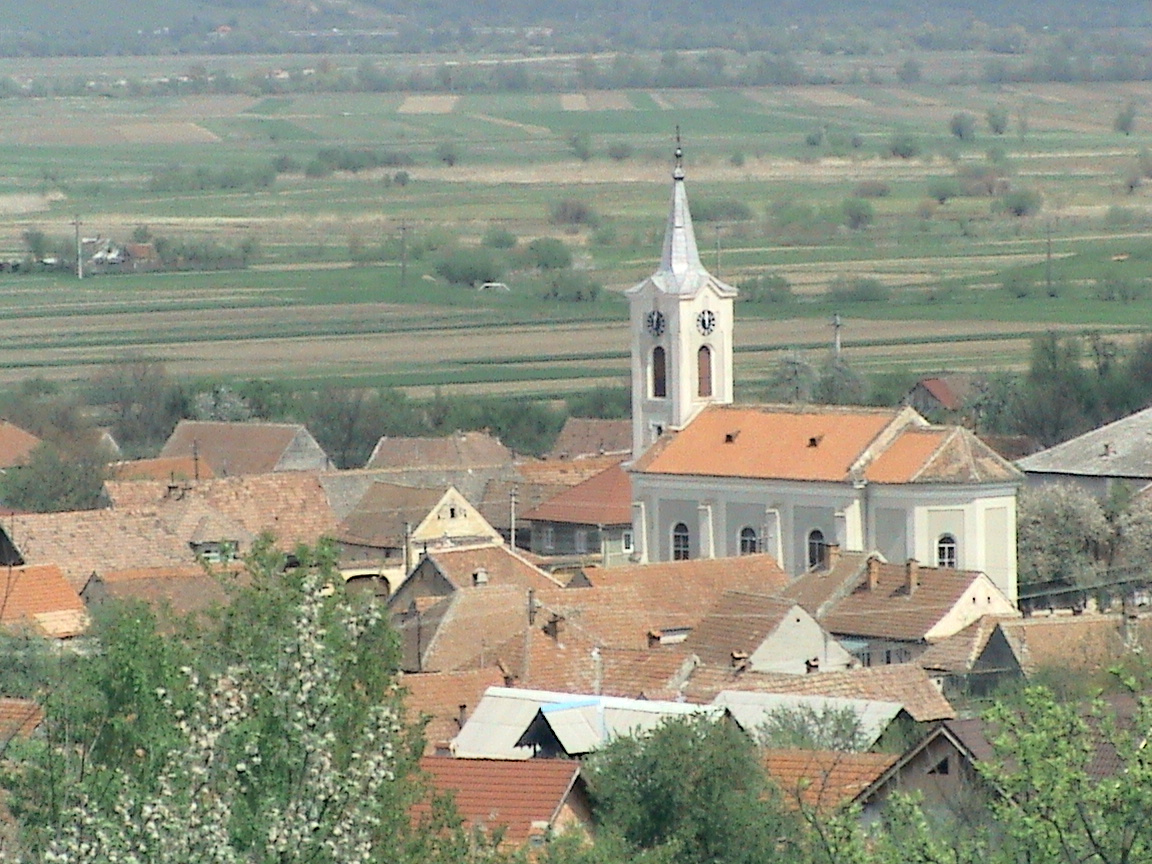
- View of Racovița

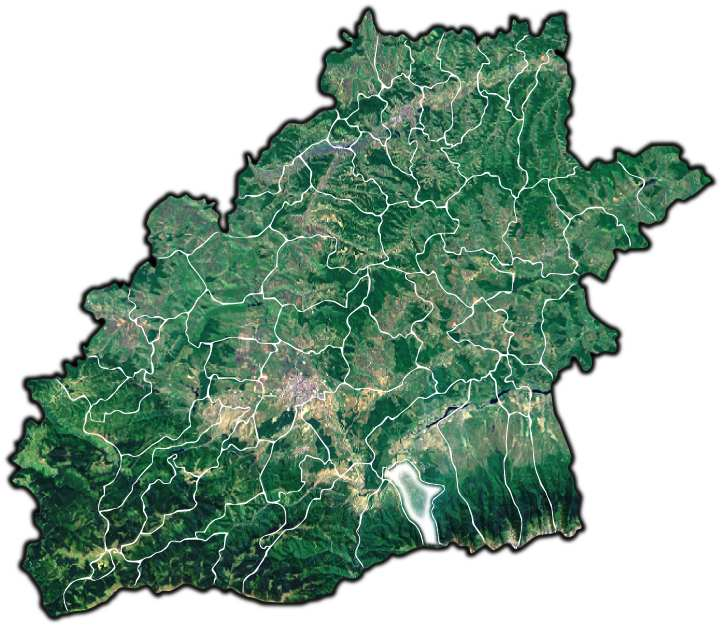
- Location in Sibiu County

- Location in Romania
- Coordinates: 45°40′45″N 24°20′38″E
- Country: Romania
- County: Sibiu
- Established: 1443 (first mentioned)
- Subdivisions: Racovița, Sebeșu de Sus

Government
  - Mayor (2020–2024): Andreea Voicu (PNL)
- Area: 34.5 km^{2} (13.3 sq mi)
- Elevation: 385 m (1,263 ft)
- Population (2021-12-01): 2,606
  - Density: 75.5/km^{2} (196/sq mi)
- Time zone: UTC+02:00 (EET)
  - Summer (DST): UTC+03:00 (EEST)
- Postal code: 557195
- Area code: +(40) 0269
- Vehicle reg.: SB
- Website: racovita-sb.ro

Racovița (Racovița-Olt until 1931; German: Rakowitza or Rakevets; Hungarian: Oltrákovica or colloquially Rákovica) is a commune in Sibiu County, Transylvania, Romania. It has a population of 2,606 inhabitants (2021 census) and is composed of two villages, Racovița and Sebeșu de Sus (Oltfelsősebes).

The first official mention of the then-village was in a 22 May 1443 "gift" act of John Hunyadi. Church documents first mention the village on 8 July 1647, when George I Rákóczi names Ion din Ţichindeal as archpriest over 17 villages around Sibiu, including Racovița. The rich history of the village is linked to the military border with Transylvania established by empress Maria Theresa of Austria in 1765. At the time, Racovița was part of the 7th Company of the First Border Regiment in Orlat.

Starting in 1698, before the village was completely militarised, the village and its area were confronted with severe religious conflicts due to the decision made by the Alba-Iulia Orthodox Church to unite with the Catholic Church.

Soldiers and villagers participated enthusiastically in the Hungarian Revolution of 1848. Once the military border was abolished in 1851, important village members took initiative to manage the Regiment School Funds and became actively involved in the Transylvanian Association for Romanian Literature and the Culture of the Romanian People.

During World War I, soldiers from Racovița served in the army from 1916 to 1918 and received distinctions for fighting against "Russian Poland", Galicia, Albania, Italy, Serbia. and even France.

== Geography ==
Racovița Commune is situated at the base of Suru Peak (2,281 m or 7,484 ft) on the contact between the foothills of the Făgăraș Mountains and the low terrace of the floodplain, on the left bank of the Olt River, at an altitude of 385 meters. The commune borders to the north and northeast with the town Avrig; the border, which extends from the confluence of the small river Mârșa with the Olt to the Sorliței Peak, was established after the year 1200 and is marked with border signs called 'morminți'.
