= Roșia de Secaș =

- Commune
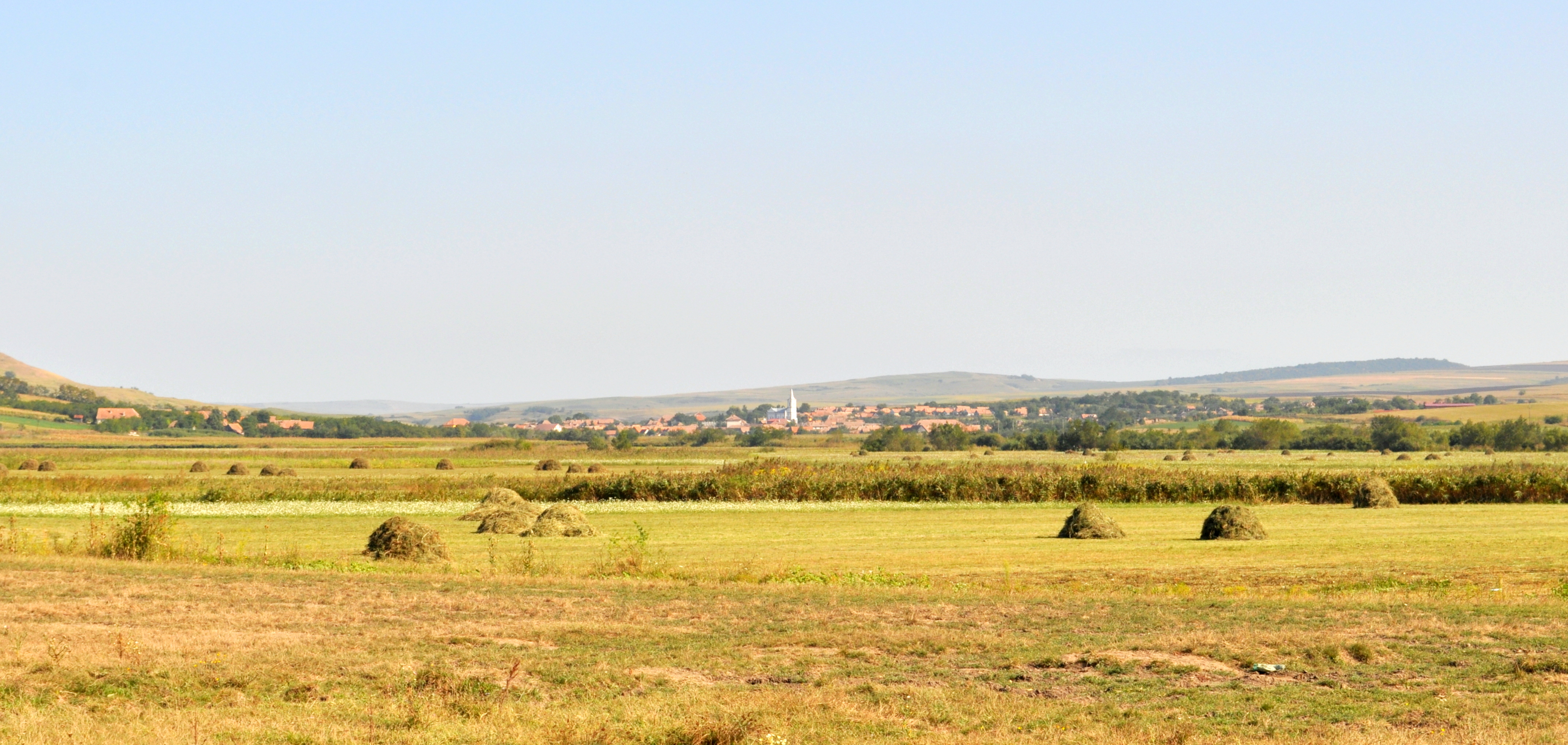
- Panoramic view of Roșia de Secaș

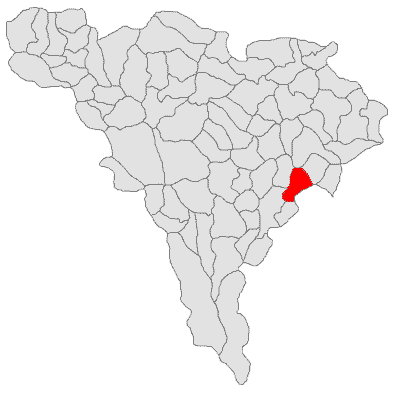
- Location in Alba County

- Location in Romania
- Coordinates: 46°03′N 23°53′E
- Country: Romania
- County: Alba

Government
  - Mayor (2020–2024): Ioan Cristea (PSD)
- Area: 52.3 km^{2} (20.2 sq mi)
- Elevation: 292 m (958 ft)
- Population (2021-12-01): 1,405
  - Density: 26.9/km^{2} (69.6/sq mi)
- Time zone: UTC+02:00 (EET)
  - Summer (DST): UTC+03:00 (EEST)
- Postal code: 517640
- Area code: (+40) 02 58
- Vehicle reg.: AB
- Website: www.rosiadesecas.ro

Roșia de Secaș (German: Rothkirchen; Hungarian: Székásveresegyháza) is a commune located in Alba County, Transylvania, Romania. It has a population of 1,405 as of 2021 and is composed of three villages: Roșia de Secaș, Tău (Székástóhát), and Ungurei (Gergelyfája).

The commune is located in the southeastern part of the county, on the border with Sibiu County, 21 km (13 mi) south of Blaj and 35 km (22 mi) east of the county seat, Alba Iulia.

Historical population
Year	Pop.	±%
1850	2,694	—
1900	3,297	+22.4%
1941	4,477	+35.8%
1977	2,752	−38.5%
2002	1,696	−38.4%
2011	1,542	−9.1%
2021	1,405	−8.9%
Source: INS, Census data
