= Păuca =

- Commune
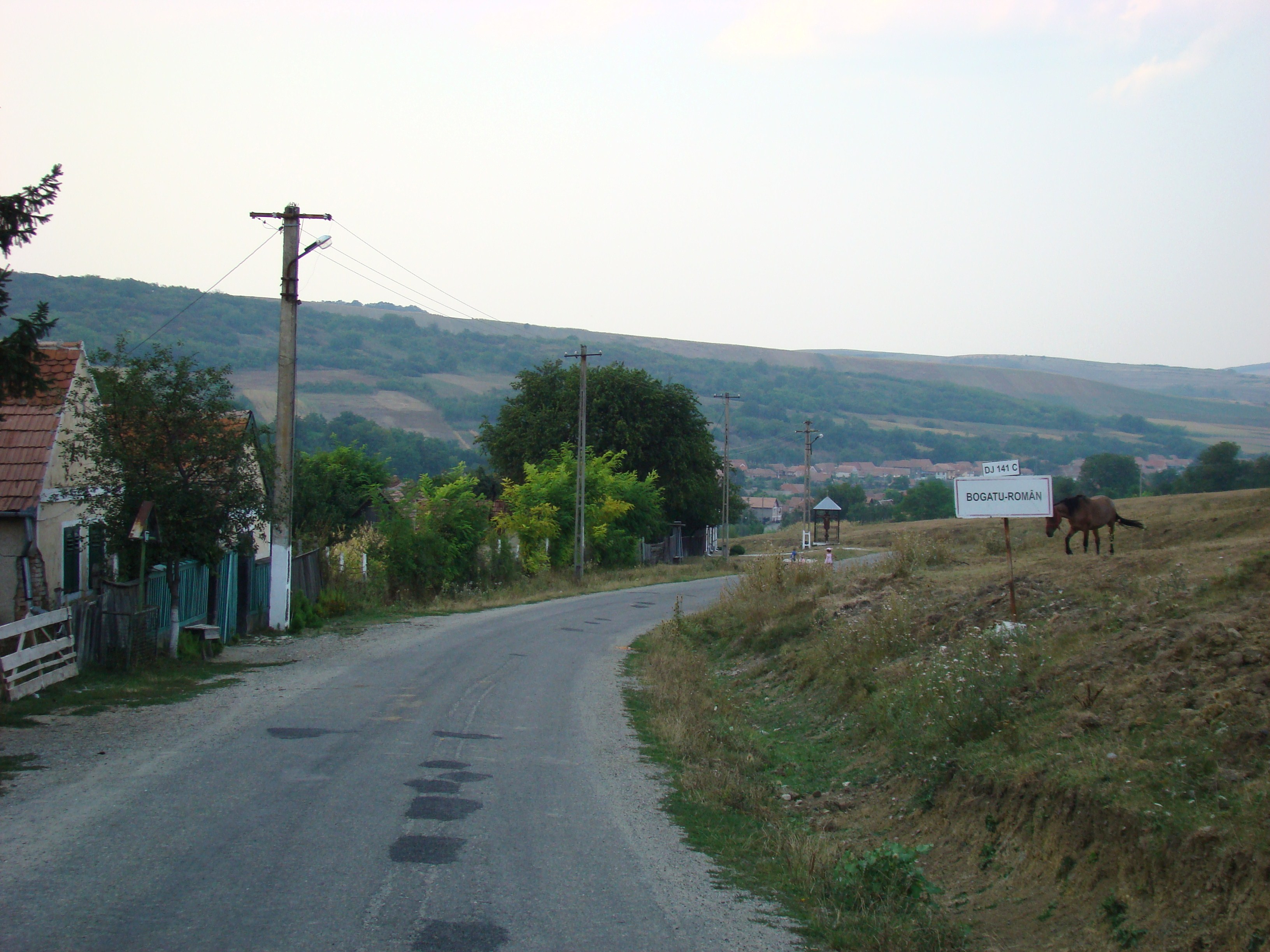
- View of Bogatu Român

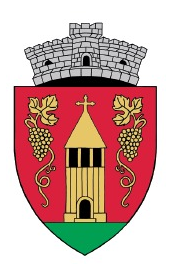
- Coat of arms

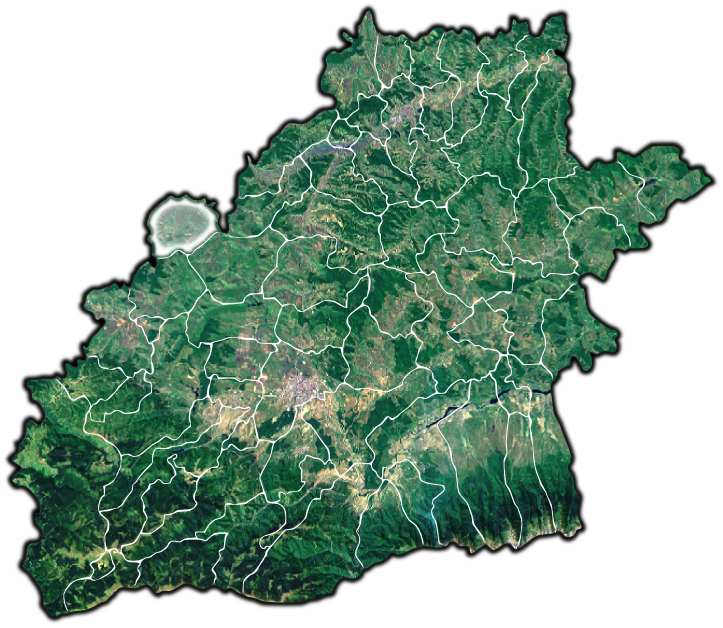
- Location in Sibiu County

- Location in Romania
- Coordinates: 46°1′N 23°54′E
- Country: Romania
- County: Sibiu

Government
  - Mayor (2024–2028): Niculae Dancu (PNL)
- Area: 73.2 km^{2} (28.3 sq mi)
- Elevation: 330 m (1,080 ft)
- Population (2021-12-01): 1,535
  - Density: 21.0/km^{2} (54.3/sq mi)
- Time zone: UTC+02:00 (EET)
  - Summer (DST): UTC+03:00 (EEST)
- Postal code: 557175
- Area code: +(40) 0269
- Vehicle reg.: SB
- Website: comunapauca.ro

Păuca (German: Törnen; Hungarian: Pókafalva) is a commune located in Sibiu County, Transylvania, Romania. It is composed of four villages: Bogatu Român (Reichhof, Oláhbogát), Broșteni (Kradendorf, Kiskerék), Păuca, and Presaca (Kerschdorf, Székásgyepü).

The commune is situated on the Transylvanian Plateau. It is located in the western part of the county, on the border with Alba County, at a distance of 47 km (29 mi) from the county seat, Sibiu, and 41 km (25 mi) from Alba Iulia.

According to the census from 2011 there was a total population of 1,929 people living in this commune, of which 94.04% were ethnic Romanians, 2.44% ethnic Roma, and 1.66% ethnic Germans. At the 2021 census, Păuca had a population of 1,535; of those, 90.55% were Romanians, 3.06% Roma, and 1.82% Germans.
