= Luncoiu de Jos =

- Commune
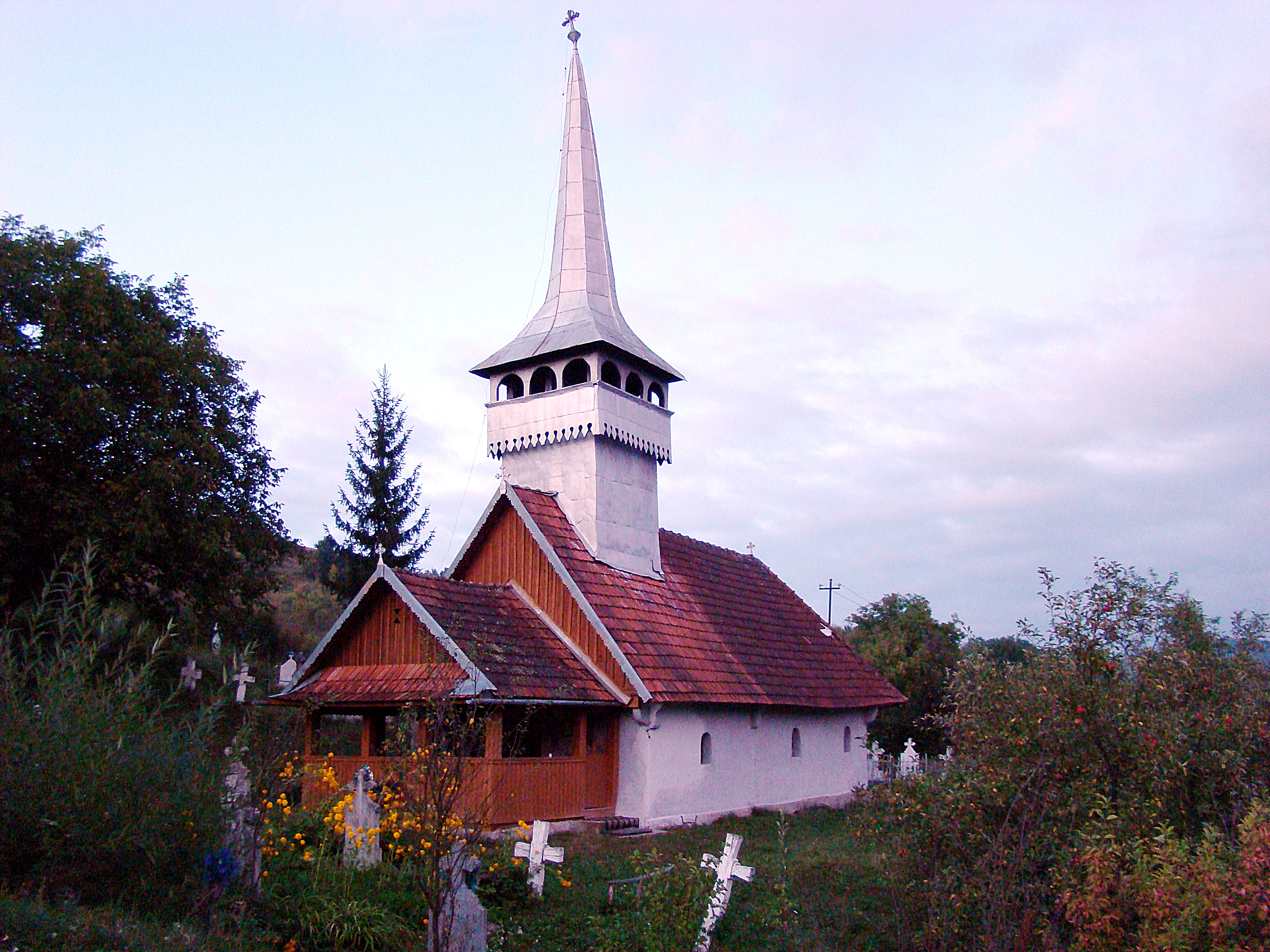
- Wooden church in Stejărel

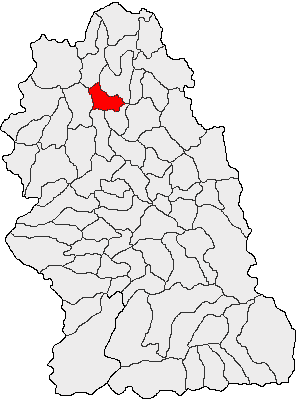
- Location in Hunedoara County

- Location in Romania
- Coordinates: 46°6′N 22°46′E
- Country: Romania
- County: Hunedoara

Government
  - Mayor (2024–2028): Călin-Dorin Dud (PNL)
- Area: 49.59 km^{2} (19.15 sq mi)
- Elevation: 363 m (1,191 ft)
- Population (2021-12-01): 1,630
  - Density: 32.9/km^{2} (85.1/sq mi)
- Time zone: UTC+02:00 (EET)
  - Summer (DST): UTC+03:00 (EEST)
- Postal code: 337310
- Area code: (+40) 02 54
- Vehicle reg.: HD
- Website: www.luncoi.ro

Luncoiu de Jos (Hungarian: Alsólunkoj, German: Langenthal) is a commune in Hunedoara County, Transylvania, Romania. It is composed of five villages: Dudești (Dudesd), Luncoiu de Jos, Luncoiu de Sus (Felsőlunkoj), Podele, and Stejărel (Szkrófa).

The commune at situated in the southwestern extremity of the Transylvanian Plateau, in the foothills of the Metaliferi Mountains, on the banks of the river Luncoiu. It is located in the northern part of Hunedoara County, 33 km (21 mi) from the county seat, Deva, just south of the city of Brad.

Luncoiu de Jos is crossed by national road DN76 (part of European Road E79), which connects Deva to Oradea. The commune is traversed by the now-defunct Căile Ferate Române Line 209, which connected Brad to Deva. Construction of the rail line started in April 1939. During World War II, Jews and Soviet prisoners of war worked on the project; up to a 1,000 are said to have died due to the harsh conditions there. The project was restarted in 1960, with a 301 m (988 ft) rail bridge over the river Mureș, and was completed in the mid-1980s.

Historical population
Year	Pop.	±%
1850	1,943	—
1966	2,636	+35.7%
2002	2,024	−23.2%
2011	1,815	−10.3%
2021	1,630	−10.2%
Source: Census data
