= Șieuț =

- Commune
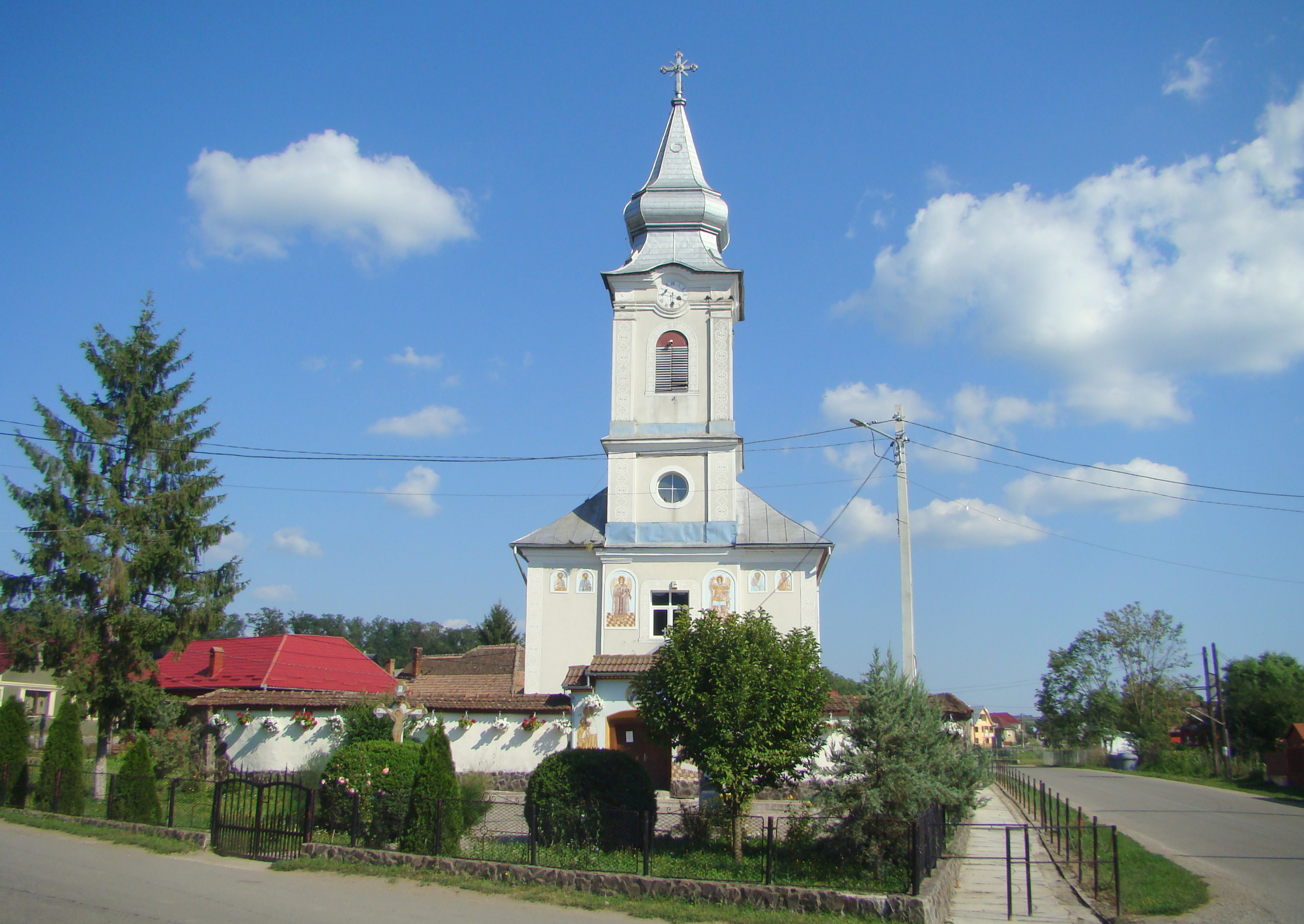
- Orthodox church in Șieuț

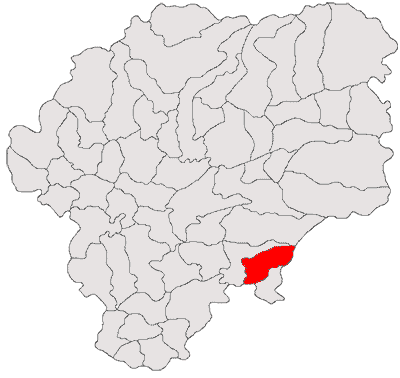
- Location in Bistrița-Năsăud County

- Location in Romania
- Coordinates: 46°59′N 24°39′E
- Country: Romania
- County: Bistrița-Năsăud

Government
  - Mayor (2020–2024): Mihai-Gheorghe Ivan (PSD)
- Area: 62.64 km^{2} (24.19 sq mi)
- Elevation: 457 m (1,499 ft)
- Population (2021-12-01): 2,417
  - Density: 38.59/km^{2} (99.94/sq mi)
- Time zone: UTC+02:00 (EET)
  - Summer (DST): UTC+03:00 (EEST)
- Postal code: 427315
- Area code: +40 x59
- Vehicle reg.: BN
- Website: www.primariasieut.ro

Șieuț (Hungarian: Kissajó; German: Kleinschogen) is a commune in Bistrița-Năsăud County, Transylvania, Romania. It is composed of four villages: Lunca (Friș, Friss; German: Freißendorf), Ruștior (Sajósebes, Sajóalsósebes, Alsósebes; German: Unterschebesch or Niederschebesch), Sebiș (Sajófelsősebes, Felsősebes, Sebes; German: Oberschebesch), and Șieuț.

The commune is located in the southeastern part of Bistrița-Năsăud County, 26 km (16 mi) from the county seat, Bistrița, on the border with Mureș County. The Șieuț train station serves the CFR Line 400, which runs from Brașov to Satu Mare.
