= Mărișelu =

- Commune
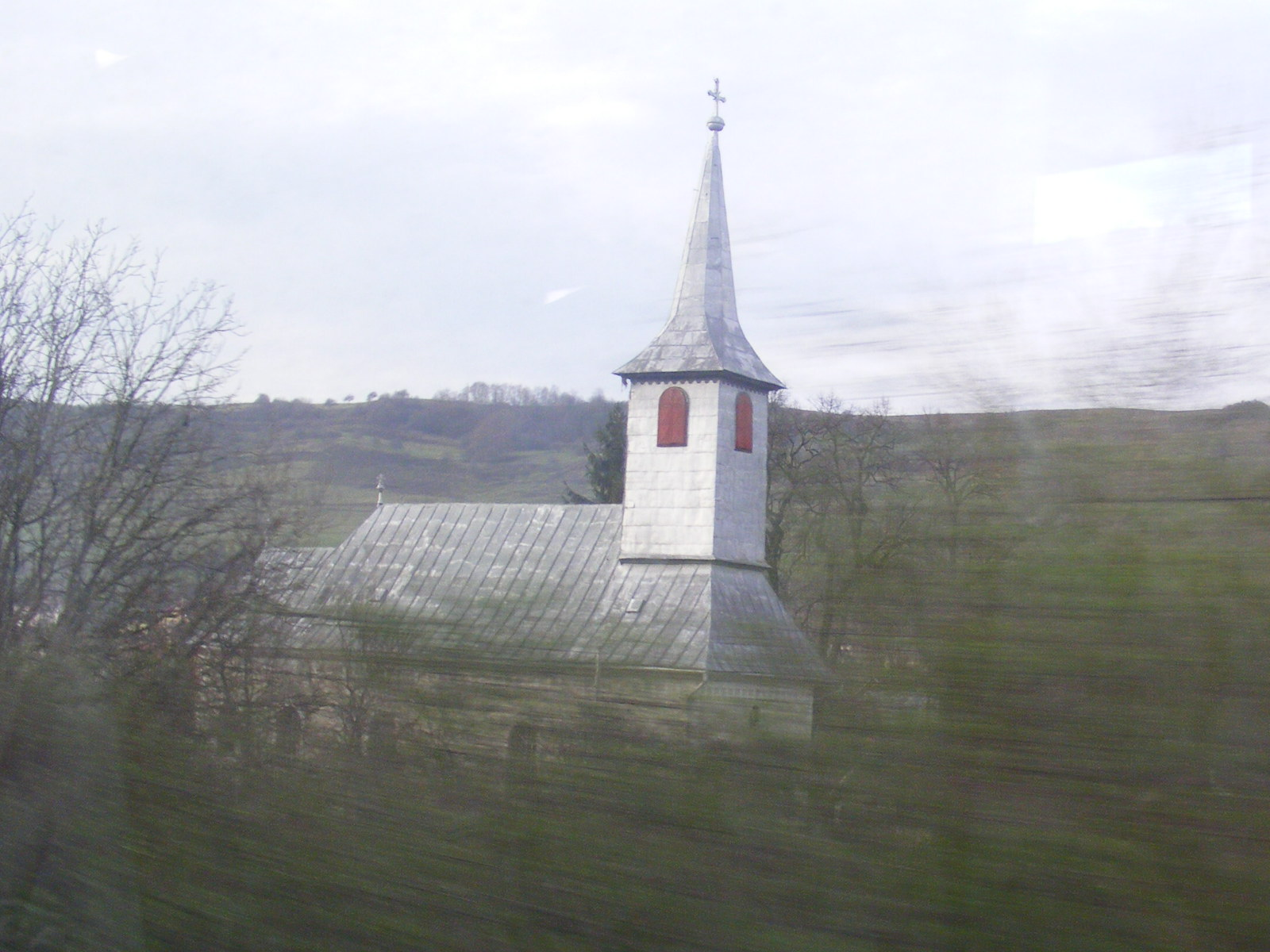
- Church in Mărișelu

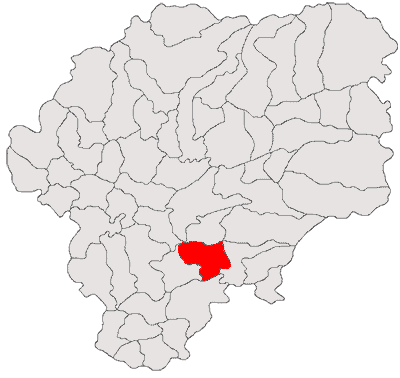
- Location in Bistrița-Năsăud County

- Location in Romania
- Coordinates: 47°0′42″N 24°30′29″E
- Country: Romania
- County: Bistrița-Năsăud

Government
  - Mayor (2020–2024): Horea-Călin Petruț (PSD)
- Area: 77.54 km^{2} (29.94 sq mi)
- Elevation: 357 m (1,171 ft)
- Population (2021-12-01): 2,246
  - Density: 28.97/km^{2} (75.02/sq mi)
- Time zone: UTC+02:00 (EET)
  - Summer (DST): UTC+03:00 (EEST)
- Postal code: 427150
- Area code: +(40) x59
- Vehicle reg.: BN
- Website: www.comunamariselu.ro

Mărișelu (formerly Nușfalău; Hungarian: Sajónagyfalu or Nagyfalu; German: Großdorf or Großendorf bei Bistritz or Grossendorf; Transylvanian Saxon: Gruszndref) is a commune in Bistrița-Năsăud County, Transylvania, Romania.

It is composed of seven villages: Bârla (Berlád; German: Bierldorf or Berldorf), Domnești (formerly Bileag; Bilak; German: Attelsdorf), Jeica (formerly Șeica, Șelca; Zselyk; German: Schelken or Schelk), Măgurele (formerly Șirling, Șârling, Cucutenii pe Șieu, Serling; German: Scherling or Schierling; Transylvanian Saxon: Schiärlänk), Mărișelu, Nețeni (Nec; German: Netz or Netzdorf; Transylvanian Saxon: Naz), and Sântioana (formerly Sânt-Ioana; Sajószentiván; German: Johannisdorf or Johannisdorf am Schogen; Transylvanian Saxon: Gehonesz).

The commune is situated on the Transylvanian Plateau, in the Nösnerland, a historic region of northeastern Transylvania. It is located in the southern part of Bistrița-Năsăud County, 20 km (12 mi) from the county seat, Bistrița, and is crossed by county road DJ154.

The route of the Via Transilvanica long-distance trail passes through the villages of Mărișelu and Măgurele.

== Natives ==
- Martin Abern (1898–1949), American Marxist politician
- Dorel Zegrean (born 1969), Romanian footballer
