= Orlat (disambiguation) =

Orlat may refer to:

- Orlat, a commune in Sibiu County, Transylvania, Romania
- Orlat (river), a tributary of the Săliște in Sibiu County, Romania
- Orlat cemetery (disambiguation), multiple locations
- Sidi Ahmed Orlat, a 14th-century ruler of an independent state of Shaki, Azerbaijan
