= Valea Caselor (Sebeș) =

Valea Caselor Sibișel
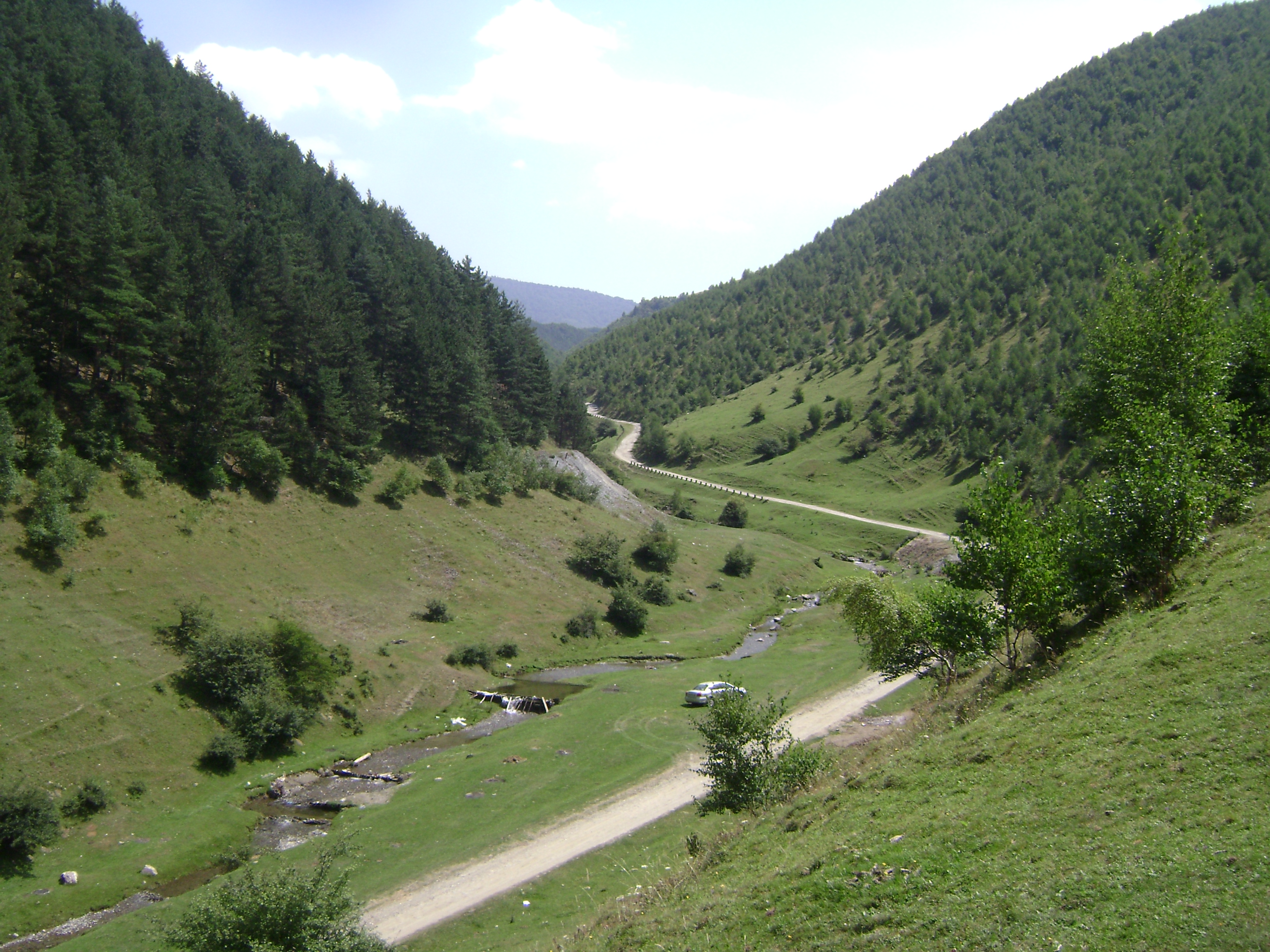

- Location within Romania

Location
- Country: Romania
- Counties: Sibiu County
- Villages: Rășinari

Physical characteristics
- Source: Mount Apa Cumpănită
  - location: Cindrel Mountains
  - coordinates: 45°39′26″N 24°01′52″E
  - elevation: 1,098 m (3,602 ft)
- Mouth: Sebeș
  - location: Rășinari
  - coordinates: 45°42′52″N 24°04′31″E
  - elevation: 531 m (1,742 ft)
- Length: 11 km (6.8 mi)
- Basin size: 22 km^{2} (8.5 sq mi)

Basin features
- Progression: Sebeș→ Cibin→ Olt→ Danube→ Black Sea
- Tributaries
  - left: Dobra, Valea Muntelui, Plaiu, Coasta

The Valea Caselor (also: Sibișel) is a right tributary of the river Sebeș in Romania. It discharges into the Sebeș in Rășinari. Its length is 11 km (6.8 mi) and its basin size is 22 km^{2} (8.5 sq mi).
