= Mag (river) =

- Location within Romania

Location
- Country: Romania
- Counties: Sibiu County
- Villages: Mag

Physical characteristics
- Mouth: Săliște
  - location: Downstream of Săcel
  - coordinates: 45.7663°N 23.9415°E
- Length: 10 km (6.2 mi)
- Basin size: 43 km^{2} (17 sq mi)

Basin features
- Progression: Săliște→ Cibin→ Olt→ Danube→ Black Sea
- Tributaries
  - right: Valea Merelor, Cerna Vodă
- River code: VIII.1.120.4.3

The Mag is a left tributary of the river Săliște in Romania. It flows into the Săliște near Săcel. Its length is 10 km (6.2 mi) and its basin size is 43 km^{2} (17 sq mi).
