= Daniil Popovici-Barcianu =

Austro-Hungarian ethnic Romanian teacher, naturalist and political activist

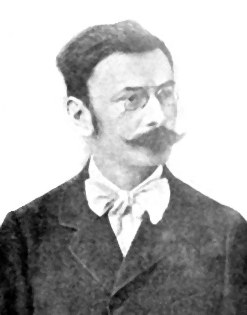
Daniil Popovici-Barcianu

Daniil Popovici-Barcianu (October 19, 1847 – February 16 [O.S. February 2] 1903) was an Austro-Hungarian ethnic Romanian teacher, naturalist and political activist.

== Biography ==
=== Origins and education ===
Born in Rășinari, Sibiu County, in the Transylvania region, his parents were the Romanian Orthodox priest Sava Popovici-Barcianu and his wife Stanca (née Cioran). Barcianu, who had a brother and two sisters, attended the local church's primary school, followed by the Lutheran gymnasium in Sibiu from 1858 to 1866. He then studied at the Sibiu theological institute from 1866 to 1869. During the 1869-1870 school year, he taught at the church school in his native village. The same year, Barcianu was sent to Germany, tasked with studying school organization in Dresden and its surroundings, in order to apply his findings at home.

In the autumn of 1870, Metropolitan Andrei Șaguna, whom he had known since childhood, granted him a scholarship to study at German-language universities. He took courses in philosophy, pedagogy and natural sciences at the universities of Vienna (1870-1871), Bonn (1871-1872) and Leipzig (1872-1874). He wrote frequent letters to his father about his studies and travels, covering topics such as the ongoing Franco-Prussian War and his lectures with Friedrich Nietzsche. He received a doctorate in philosophy at Leipzig in the summer of 1874, with a thesis about botany.

=== Career ===
Barcianu had difficulty securing employment as a teacher or church administrator, and refused an offer from the Romanian Old Kingdom's University of Bucharest, stating he was needed in Transylvania. It was only in late 1875 that he found work as a secretary at the Sibiu-based Astra; the job paid less than his student scholarship. As such, he worked to establish a girls' school, which he headed from 1876 to 1887. In 1876, he was named professor at the theological-pedagogical institute, remaining there until 1901. In the theological wing, he taught Romanian language and literature from 1877 onward, with the exception of the year he spent in prison. In the pedagogical section, he taught Romanian language as well as zoology, botany and mineralogy. He set up a natural science room featuring stuffed animals, plants and minerals.

In 1901, upon the recommendation of Metropolitan Ioan Mețianu, the Sibiu Archdiocese elected him cultural adviser, charged with supervising the archdiocese's schools. He managed to found several school libraries and embarked on inspections in order to assess the state of education. Taken ill after one such visit to a village near Sibiu, he died in early 1903, aged 55.

=== Transylvanian Memorandum and cultural activity ===
Barcianu's publications included textbooks and works on pedagogy, as well as new editions of his father's writings. In 1876-1877, together with several colleagues, he edited a literary supplement to Telegraful Român that promoted phonetic spelling. In 1891, he edited a popular literary and scientific newspaper on his own, while in 1897-1900, he edited Foaia pedagogică in collaboration. He contributed articles to Telegraful Român and, from 1884, to Tribuna. He again served as secretary at Astra from 1881 to 1887, and from 1889 to 1901 headed the Romanian teachers' association of Szeben County. Active in several other societies, Barcianu was long a lay member of the archdiocesan synod, where he notably spoke in 1900 regarding proposals for a new cathedral.

Together with his friend and colleague Dimitrie Comșa, Barcianu belonged to the leadership of the Romanian National Party, and as such helped draft the 1892 Transylvanian Memorandum. As a result, he was among those collectively tried in May 1894. Sentenced to two and a half years in prison, he was held at Vác until a general amnesty was granted in September 1895. Barcianu married Silvia Olteanu in 1882. She died in 1902, and after her husband's death the following year, the couple's four sons and two daughters were raised by his sister.
