= Sibiel =

- Location within Romania

Location
- Country: Romania
- Counties: Sibiu County
- Villages: Crinț, Sibiel

Physical characteristics
- Mouth: Săliște
  - coordinates: 45.7649°N 23.9411°E
- Length: 15 km (9.3 mi)
- Basin size: 41 km^{2} (16 sq mi)

Basin features
- Progression: Săliște→ Cibin→ Olt→ Danube→ Black Sea
- Tributaries
  - right: Sibelaș, Valea Cetății, Pârâul lui Toderaș, Zăvoaia

The Sibiel is a right tributary of the river Săliște in Romania. It discharges into the Săliște near Fântânele. Its length is 15 km (9.3 mi) and its basin size is 41 km^{2} (16 sq mi).

Sibiel lies in the foothills of the Transylvania Alps, which range to the south and west of the village. It is known to be a rural village of mainly farming homesteads, where the population farms cattle, sheep, and orchids of apples, grapes, plums, and pears. A tributary of the river runs through the village.
