= Valea Izvorului River =

Valea Izvorului River may refer to:

- Valea Izvorului, a tributary of the Lotru in Vâlcea County, Romania
- Valea Izvorului, a tributary of the Valea Ploscarilor in Sibiu County, Romania
