= Tocila River =

Tocila River may refer to:

- Tocila, a tributary of the Lăpuș in Maramureș County, Romania
- Tocila Mare, a tributary of the Valea Tocilelor in Sibiu County, Romania
- Tocila Mică, a tributary of the Valea Tocilelor in Sibiu County, Romania

== See also ==
- Tocilița River, in Brașov County, Romania
