= Lungșoara =

- Location within Romania

Location
- Country: Romania
- Counties: Sibiu County
- Villages: Tălmăcel, Tălmaciu

Physical characteristics
- Mouth: Cibin
  - location: Tălmaciu
  - coordinates: 45°39′33″N 24°16′01″E
  - elevation: 370 m (1,210 ft)
- Length: 10 km (6.2 mi)
- Basin size: 28 km^{2} (11 sq mi)

Basin features
- Progression: Cibin→ Olt→ Danube→ Black Sea
- Tributaries
  - left: Tălmăcuța
  - right: Strungarul, Râușorul

The Lungșoara is a right tributary of the river Cibin in Romania. It discharges into the Cibin in Tălmaciu. Its length is 10 km (6.2 mi) and its basin size is 28 km^{2} (11 sq mi).
