= Valea Șerpuița =

- Location within Romania

Location
- Country: Romania
- Counties: Sibiu County
- Villages: Hamba, Șura Mare

Physical characteristics
- Mouth: Rusciori
  - location: Sibiu
  - coordinates: 45.8128°N 24.1490°E
- Length: 11 km (6.8 mi)
- Basin size: 35 km^{2} (14 sq mi)

Basin features
- Progression: Rusciori→ Cibin→ Olt→ Danube→ Black Sea
- Tributaries
  - right: Valea Popilor

The Valea Șerpuița is a left tributary of the river Rusciori in Romania. It flows into the Rusciori in the city Sibiu. Its length is 11 km (6.8 mi) and its basin size is 35 km^{2} (14 sq mi).
