= Râul Mic =

Râul Mic may refer to:

- Râul Mic (Cugir), Romania
- Râul Mic (Cibin), Romania
