= Valea Comenzii River =

Valea Comenzii River may refer to:

- Valea Comenzii, another name for the upper course of the Râul Mic in Sibiu County, Romania
- Valea Comenzii, a headwater of the Sădurel in Sibiu County, Romania
