= Samuel von Brukenthal National College =

- German: Samuel-von-Brukenthal-Gymnasium; Romanian: Colegiul Național "Samuel von Brukenthal"
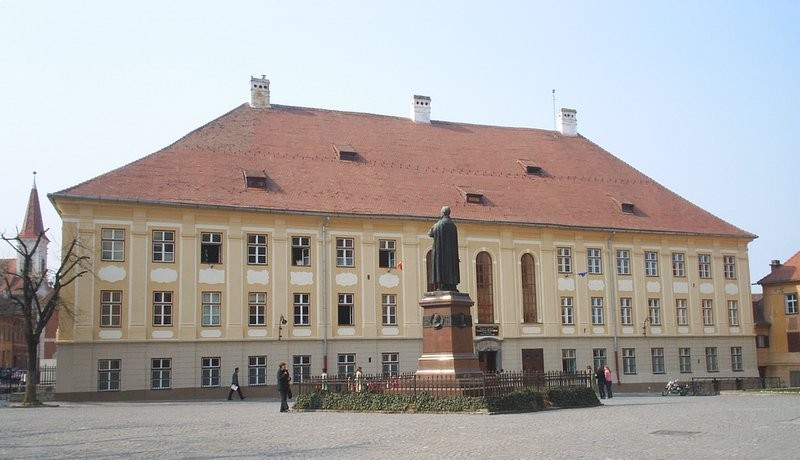

Location
- Piața Albert Huet, Nr. 5 Sibiu, Sibiu County; Romania
- Coordinates: 45.7972°N 24.1497°E

Information
- Established: 1380; 646 years ago
- Website: brukenthal.ro

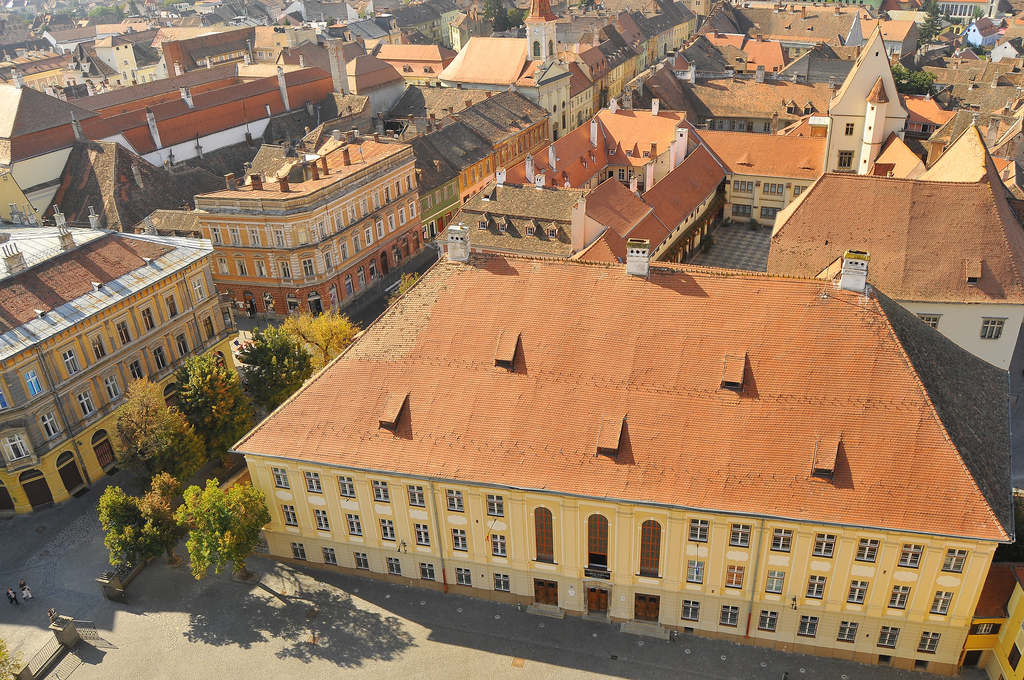
Samuel von Brukenthal national college in Sibiu (German: Hermannstadt)

Samuel von Brukenthal National College (German: Samuel-von-Brukenthal-Gymnasium, Romanian: Colegiul Național "Samuel von Brukenthal", Hungarian: Samuel von Brukenthal Főgimnázium) is a German-language high school founded in Nagyszeben, Transylvania, Kingdom of Hungary, today in Sibiu (German: Hermannstadt), Sibiu County, Romania, located at 5 Albert Huet Square.

The school is named after baron Samuel von Brukenthal, governor of the Grand Principality of Transylvania between 6 July 1774 and 9 January 1787. The earliest record of the school is from 1380, making it the oldest German-language school on the territory of present-day Romania. The current school building was built between 1779 and 1786 on the site of an earlier school, and is classified as a historical monument with LMI code SB-II-m-A-12082.

== Notable alumni ==
- Septimiu Albini (1861–1919), journalist and political activist
- Romulus Cândea (1886–1973), ecclesiastical historian
- Dimitrie Comșa (1846–1931), agronomist and political activist
- Arthur Coulin (1869–1912), painter and art critic
- Bernd Fabritius (born 1965), German politician
- Klaus Johannis, President of Romania
- Karl Kurt Klein (1897–1971), theologian and writer
- Friedrich Müller-Langenthal (1884–1969), historian and theologian
- Rubin Patiția (1841–1918), lawyer and political activist
- Daniil Popovici-Barcianu (1847–1903), teacher, naturalist, and political activist
- Arthur Arz von Straußenburg (1857–1935), Chief of the General Staff of the Austro-Hungarian Army
- Viorel Tilea (1896–1972), diplomat
