= Orlat cemetery =

Orlat Cemetery may refer to:

- Cemetery of the Defenders of Lwów, in Lviv, Ukraine
- An archeological site in Uzbekistan, see Orlat plaques
- Orlat cemetery, Hungary
