= Dimitrie Comșa =

Imperial Austrian-born Romanian agronomist and political activist

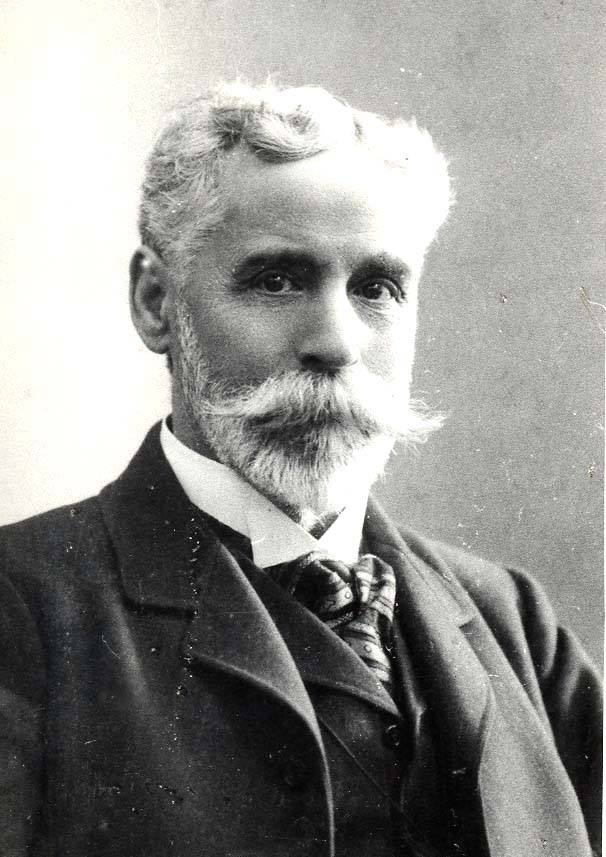
Dimitrie Comșa

Dimitrie Comșa (September 29, 1846–February 15, 1931) was an Imperial Austrian-born Romanian agronomist and political activist.

== Biography ==
=== Origins and teaching ===
Born into a peasant family in Sibiu, in the Transylvania region, Comșa was one of three sons and three daughters; his father was a choir singer in the local Romanian Orthodox parish. Initially enrolling in the affiliated church school, he then studied at the Lutheran gymnasium. From an early age, he had to give private lessons and copy documents in order to support his poor family. After six classes of gymnasium, he went to the Sibiu theological institute from 1868 to 1871. Meanwhile, on his own, he passed the matura examination.

Comșa was a favorite of Metropolitan Andrei Șaguna, who had intervened to prevent him from being drafted into the Austro-Hungarian Army, and in 1871, his patron offered him a scholarship to study abroad. He was sent to learn agronomy, the intention being that he would lecture on the subject to priests and teachers, who would disseminate knowledge of modern agricultural methods. From 1871 to 1873, he studied at the agronomy academies in Altenburg (where he was considered the best student) and Leipzig, then practicing various branches of agriculture in Germany and Bohemia.

In 1874, he was named a professor of economics and agriculture at Sibiu. Except for his prison term, Comșa taught there for thirty-five years. In 1909, the government forced him to retire due to the fact that he did not know Hungarian; at the time, the Minister of Education was Albert Apponyi, a proponent of Magyarization. Active in both the theological and pedagogical branches of the institute, he mainly taught horticulture and the cultivation of fruit trees and vegetables, the three subjects being merged as "rural economics" in 1892.

=== Writings and peasantry involvement ===
Interested in improving the material situation of the peasantry, Comșa worked to establish an agricultural council for Szeben County in 1888, and served as president from 1893 to 1905. In the 1890s and 1900s, aided by his former student Victor Tordășianu, he organized some two dozen exhibitions of calves in the county's settlements, also exhibiting sheep and fruits; juries would award prizes to the winners. Every year, he helped organize workshops and lectures in which he would introduce modern techniques to the peasants. He set up credit institutions that allowed them to purchase equipment, or else lent these at modest prices.

His first book, Pomăritul, appeared in 1877 and dealt with fruit tree cultivation. Several others followed through the late 1920s, notably the three-volume Călăuza agricolă (1924–1925), a collection of his lectures. He edited Călindarul bunului econom (1877–1881) and Economul (1893–1894), publishing numerous articles in each; his writings on agriculture and economics appeared in other periodicals, such as Telegraful Român and Foaia Poporului. At Sibiu in 1902, he organized an ample show of Romanian folk art attended by over 8000 people, including Ioan Bianu and Eugeniu Carada from the Romanian Old Kingdom.

In 1904, his experience with the show and interest in ethnography led Comșa to publish an album encompassing 284 textile weaves. Lauded at home and abroad, the book was purchased by museums and libraries in Budapest, Vienna, Berlin, Paris, Rome and Bucharest. A similar project was a 1909 album presenting 243 carved wooden pieces, such as distaffs, crosses, clubs and spoons.

=== Transylvanian Memorandum ===
Active in the national movement of Transylvania's Romanians, he helped found Tribuna and Foaia Poporului newspapers, and belonged to the Romanian National Party's executive committee. As such, in 1892 he helped draft the Transylvanian Memorandum, which led to his prosecution. He was interrogated in the spring of 1893, admitting that he took part in the meetings that decided on the document's final text and that he agreed to its publication in four languages. As the interrogation record was not written in his native language, he refused to sign it. He made similar statements during the trial, held at Cluj in May 1894, and declared that he knew of no "Comșa Demeter" (the Magyarized version of his name).

He was sentenced to three years, the second-longest term out of all the defendants. Held at Vác prison, his wife and children joined him in the town, renting a room there. He remained there for fourteen months, until September 1895, when all the prisoners were released. He spent the time writing; meanwhile, the church cut his salary in half, forcing him to return home on borrowed money. He ended up heavily indebted, which forced him to sell his house, and two of his children had their health ruined. Although Comșa resigned from the party leadership after being released, he continued to be active in the national cause, gradually increasing his contributions to Astra by holding conferences and organizing exhibits.

=== Later years and legacy ===
In 1922, after the union of Transylvania with Romania, Metropolitan Nicolae Bălan invited the aged Comșa to organize an archdiocesan museum featuring old church objects; lacking qualified personnel, he also asked him to teach his old subjects for the 1922–1923 school year. In 1926, upon the occasion of his 80th birthday, he was elected an honorary member of the Romanian Academy, and a festive celebration was held, with around a dozen speakers who included Comșa himself. He died in 1931, and the government accorded him a state funeral. The service was held at the Sibiu Orthodox Cathedral, led by vicar bishop Vasile Stan. Speeches were given by both the clergy and state officials; burial took place in Sibiu. Among the series of obituaries that followed was one by Nicolae Iorga, who emphasized Comșa's contributions as ethnographer.

Comșa was married twice. His first wife, Constanția, was the sister of Eugen Brote. A native of Rășinari, she died in 1879. They had one son, Victor, who died in Budapest in 1904 while serving in the military. His second wife, Otilia Cioran (1856–1925), was also from Rășinari. Their son Emanoil (1882–1961) was a bank director; their daughters were Erica Otilia (1886–1915) and Stela (1892–1978).
