= St. Nicholas Church, Orlat =

Heritage site in Sibiu County, Romania

Coordinates: 45°45′17″N 23°58′06″E

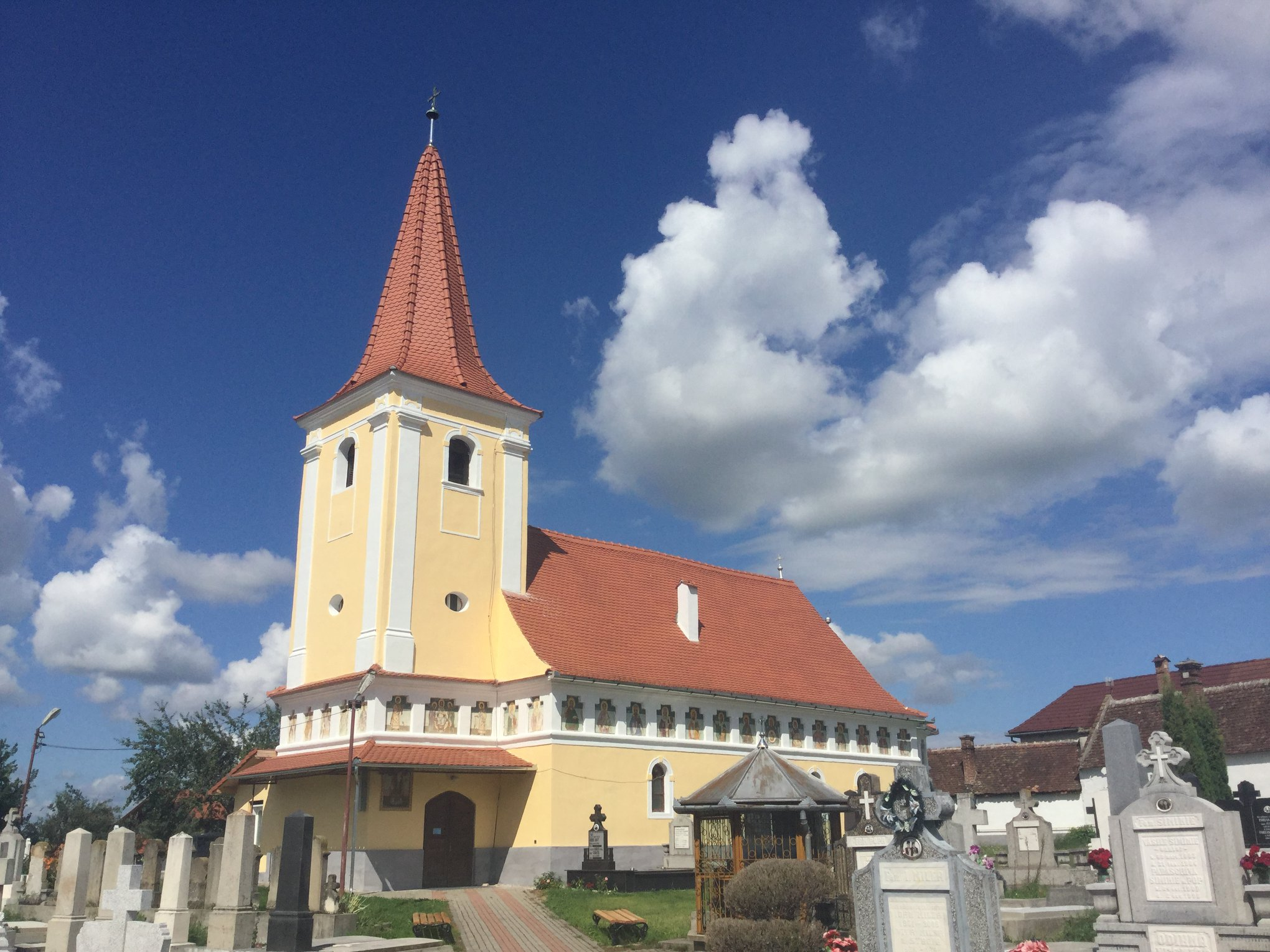
St. Nicholas Church

St. Nicholas Church (Romanian: Biserica Sfântul Nicolae) is a Greek Catholic, since 1948 Romanian Orthodox church located at 542 Câmpușorului Street, Orlat, Sibiu County, Romania. It is dedicated to Saint Nicholas.

The church dates to 1794. It is listed as a historic monument by Romania's Ministry of Culture and Religious Affairs.

From 1910 to 1916, writer Ion Agârbiceanu served there as a parish priest, when the church was still Greek Catholic.
