= Săliște (Cibin) =

Săliște Râul Negru
- Location within Romania

Location
- Country: Romania
- Counties: Sibiu County
- Villages: Jina, Tilișca, Galeş, Săliște, Săcel

Physical characteristics
- Mouth: Cibin
  - coordinates: 45.7640°N 23.9655°E
- Length: 32 km (20 mi)
- Basin size: 220 km^{2} (85 sq mi)
- Discharge
  - location: *
  - average: 1.01 m^{3}/s (36 cu ft/s)

Basin features
- Progression: Cibin→ Olt→ Danube→ Black Sea

The Săliște (also: Râul Negru and Valea Mare) is a left tributary of the river Cibin in Romania. It discharges into the Cibin in Orlat. Its length is 32 km (20 mi) and its basin size is 220 km^{2} (85 sq mi).

== Tributaries ==
The following rivers are tributaries of the river Săliște:

- Left: Luncuța, Mag
- Right: Căptanu, Pârâul Peștilor, Greul, Pârâul Muntelui, Valea Drojdiei, Tilișca, Valea Muierii, Sibiel, Orlat
