= Cisnădie (river) =

Cisnădie Pârâul Argintului
- Location within Romania

Location
- Country: Romania
- Counties: Sibiu County
- Villages: Cisnădioara, Cisnădie

Physical characteristics
- Source: Cindrel Mountains, Curmătura Măgurii
  - coordinates: 45°39′43″N 24°05′20″E
  - elevation: 908 m (2,979 ft)
- Mouth: Cibin
  - location: Upstream of Mohu
  - coordinates: 45°45′08″N 24°13′10″E
  - elevation: 385 m (1,263 ft)
- Length: 18 km (11 mi)
- Basin size: 46 km^{2} (18 sq mi)

Basin features
- Progression: Cibin→ Olt→ Danube→ Black Sea
- Tributaries
  - right: Valea Popii

The Cisnădie (German: Silberbach, Hungarian: Kisdisznód) is a right tributary of the river Cibin in Romania. It discharges into the Cibin near Mohu. Its length is 18 km (11 mi) and its basin size is 46 km^{2} (18 sq mi). The reach upstream of Cisnădioara is sometimes called Pârâul Argintului.
