= Rusciori (river) =

Rusciori Rușcior
- Location within Romania

Location
- Country: Romania
- Counties: Sibiu County
- Villages: Rusciori

Physical characteristics
- Mouth: Cibin
  - location: Sibiu
  - coordinates: 45.8074°N 24.1599°E
- Length: 16 km (9.9 mi)
- Basin size: 123 km^{2} (47 sq mi)

Basin features
- Progression: Cibin→ Olt→ Danube→ Black Sea
- Tributaries
  - left: Pârâul Strâmb, Valea Șerpuița
  - right: Valea Sălcii

The Rusciori (also: Rușcior) is a left tributary of the river Cibin in Romania. It discharges into the Cibin in the city Sibiu. Its length is 16 km (9.9 mi) and its basin size is 123 km^{2} (47 sq mi).
