= Orlat (river) =

- Location within Romania

Location
- Country: Romania
- Counties: Sibiu County
- Villages: Orlat

Physical characteristics
- Mouth: Săliște
  - location: Orlat
  - coordinates: 45.7576°N 23.9633°E
- Length: 15 km (9.3 mi)
- Basin size: 19 km^{2} (7.3 sq mi)

Basin features
- Progression: Săliște→ Cibin→ Olt→ Danube→ Black Sea
- Tributaries
  - right: Orlățel

The Orlat is a right tributary of the river Săliște in Romania. It flows into the Săliște in the village Orlat. Its length is 15 km (9.3 mi) and its basin size is 19 km^{2} (7.3 sq mi).
