= Sebeș (Cibin) =

Sebeș Seviș
- Location within Romania

Location
- Country: Romania
- Counties: Sibiu County
- Villages: Rășinari, Șelimbăr

Physical characteristics
- Source: Cindrel Mountains
- Mouth: Cibin
  - location: Șelimbăr
  - coordinates: 45°45′13″N 24°13′10″E
  - elevation: 290 m (950 ft)
- Length: 30 km (19 mi)
- Basin size: 101 km^{2} (39 sq mi)

Basin features
- Progression: Cibin→ Olt→ Danube→ Black Sea

The Sebeș (also: Seviș, in its upper course also: Șteaza) is a right tributary of the river Cibin in Romania. Its source is in the Cindrel Mountains. It discharges into the Cibin in Șelimbăr, southeast of Sibiu. Its length is 30 km (19 mi) and its basin size is 101 km^{2} (39 sq mi).

== Tributaries ==
The following rivers are tributaries to the river Sebeș (from source to mouth):

Left: -

Right: Șanta, Valea Ploscarilor, Strâmba, Valea Caselor, Valea Stupului
