= Transylvanian Military Frontier =

States and territories established in 1762

- District of The Military Frontier, Habsburg monarchy
- 1762–1851
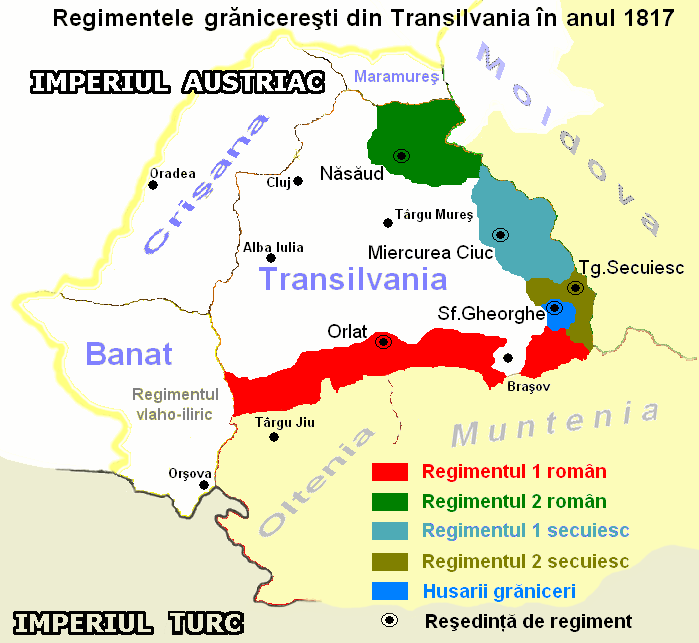
- The Frontier in 1817, with the different regiments shown
- History
  - Established: 1762
  - Disestablished: 1851
| Preceded by | Succeeded by |
| Principality of Transylvania | Principality of Transylvania |
- Today part of: Romania

The Transylvanian Military Frontier (Romanian: Granița Militară Transilvăneană; German: Siebenbürgische Militärgrenze; Hungarian: Erdélyi határőrvidék) was a territory in the Habsburg monarchy. It was a section of the Habsburg Military Frontier.

== History ==
It was founded in 1762 from territories that had been part of the Habsburg Principality of Transylvania. After it was abolished, the territory of the Transylvanian Military Frontier was reincorporated into the principality.

== Borders ==
Within the Habsburg monarchy the Transylvanian Military Frontier bordered the Principality of Transylvania and the Kingdom of Hungary in the northwest, the Banatian Military Frontier in the southwest, and Bukovina (part of Galicia and Lodomeria until 1849, a separate duchy thereafter) in the northeast. It also bordered the Ottoman vassal principalities of Wallachia and Moldavia in the southeast.

== Regiments ==
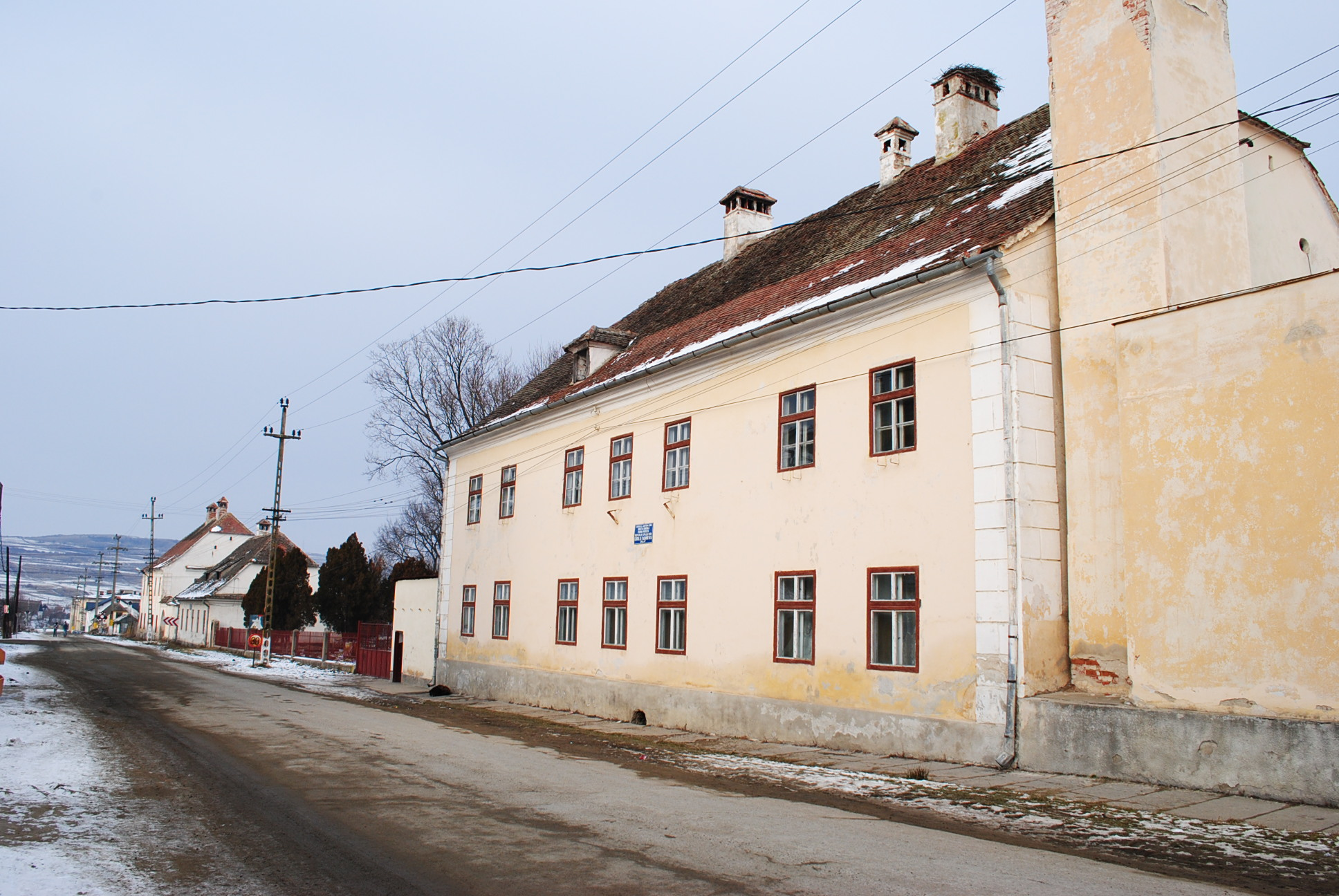
Old headquarters of the 1st Romanian Border Guards Regiment in Orlat

The Transylvanian Military Frontier was composed of two Romanian and two Székely frontier regiments, and a Hussars regiment, garrisoned as follows:

- 1st Romanian Regiment at Orlat
- 2nd Romanian Regiment at Năsăud
- 1st Székely Regiment at Miercurea Ciuc
- 2nd Székely Regiment at Târgu Secuiesc
- Hussar border guards at Sfântu Gheorghe

A Romanian dragoon regiment, also garrisoned at Năsăud, existed between 1762 and 1770 as well.

Transylvanian Military Frontier Regiments

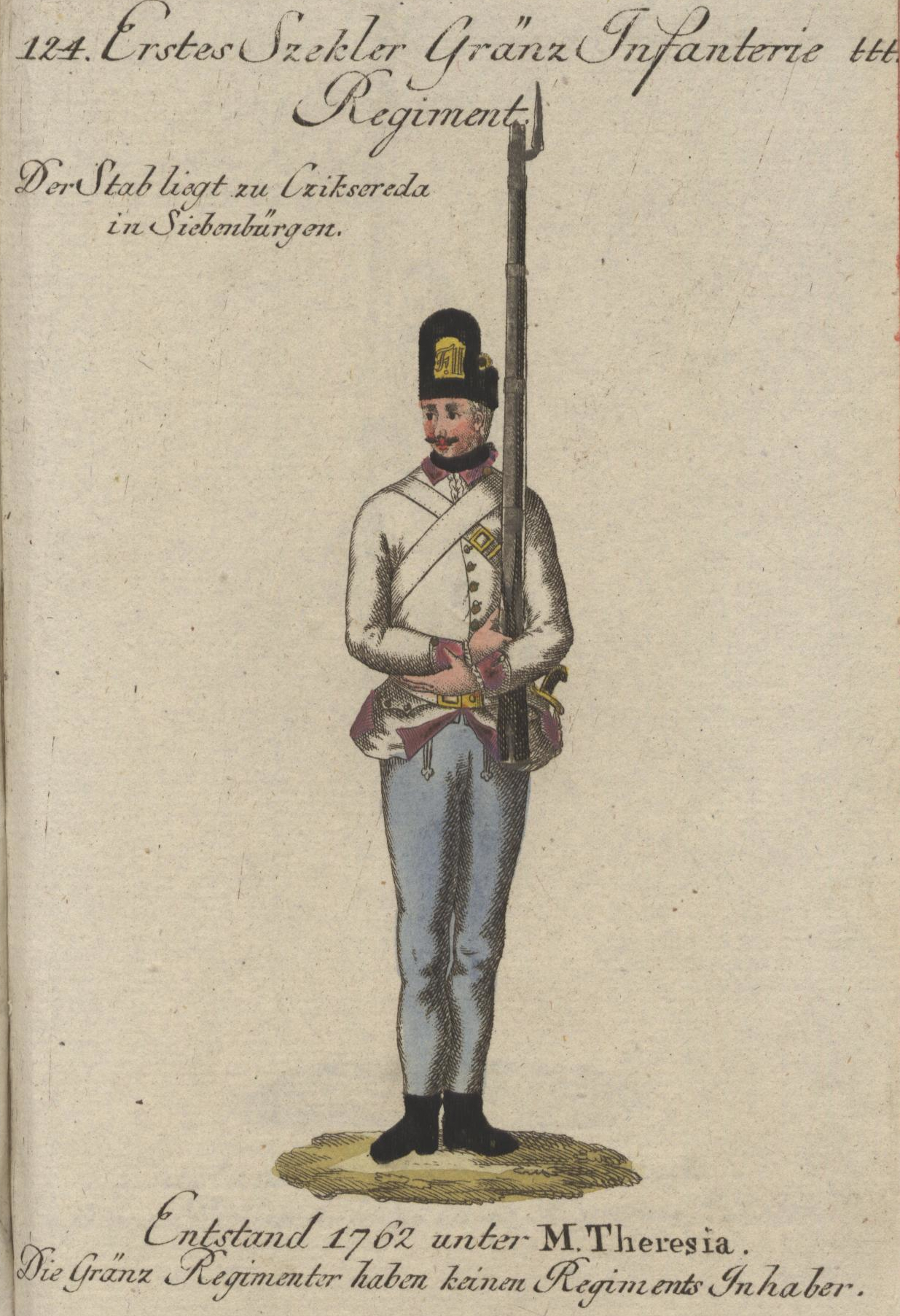
1st Székely Regiment

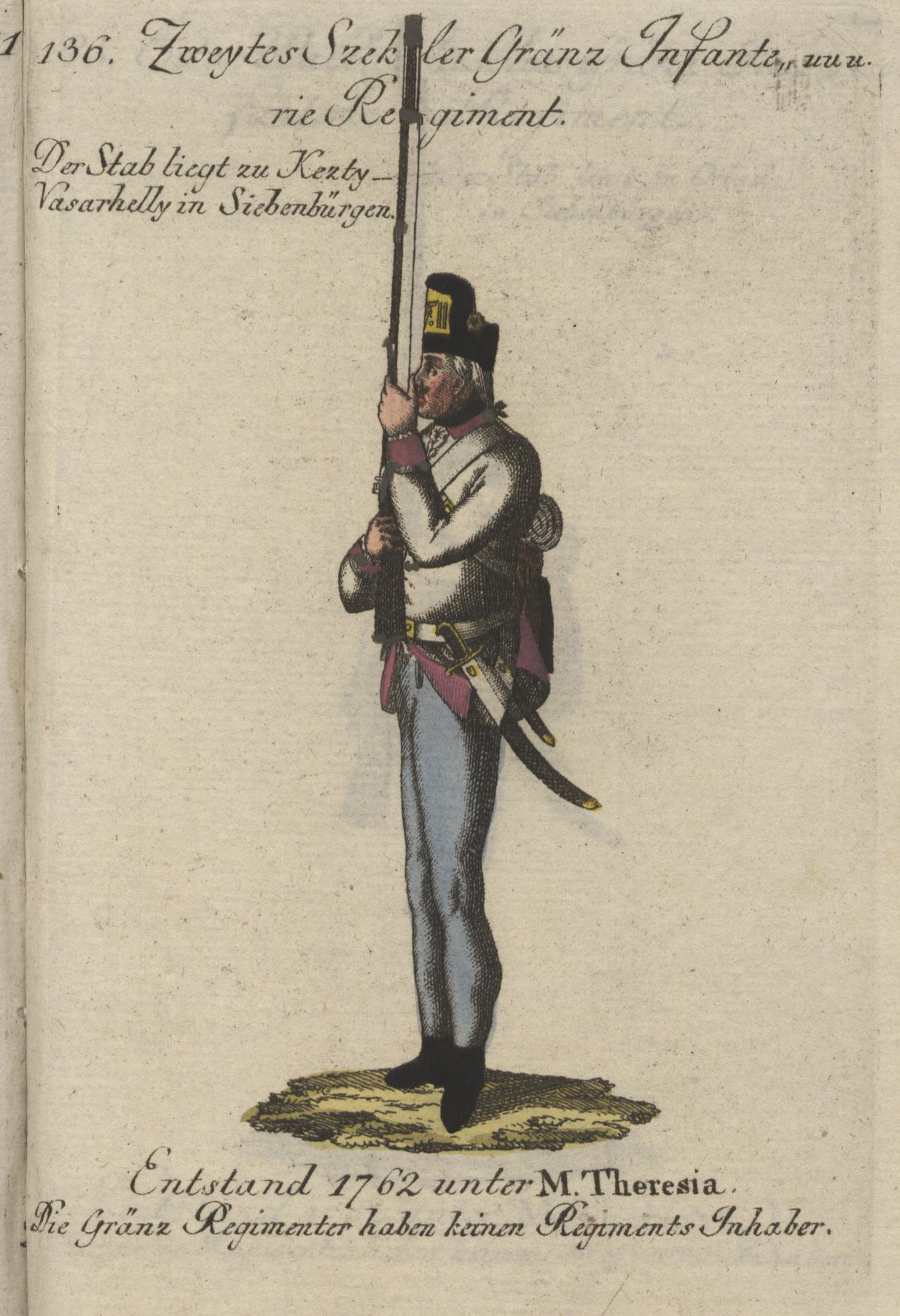
2nd Székely Regiment

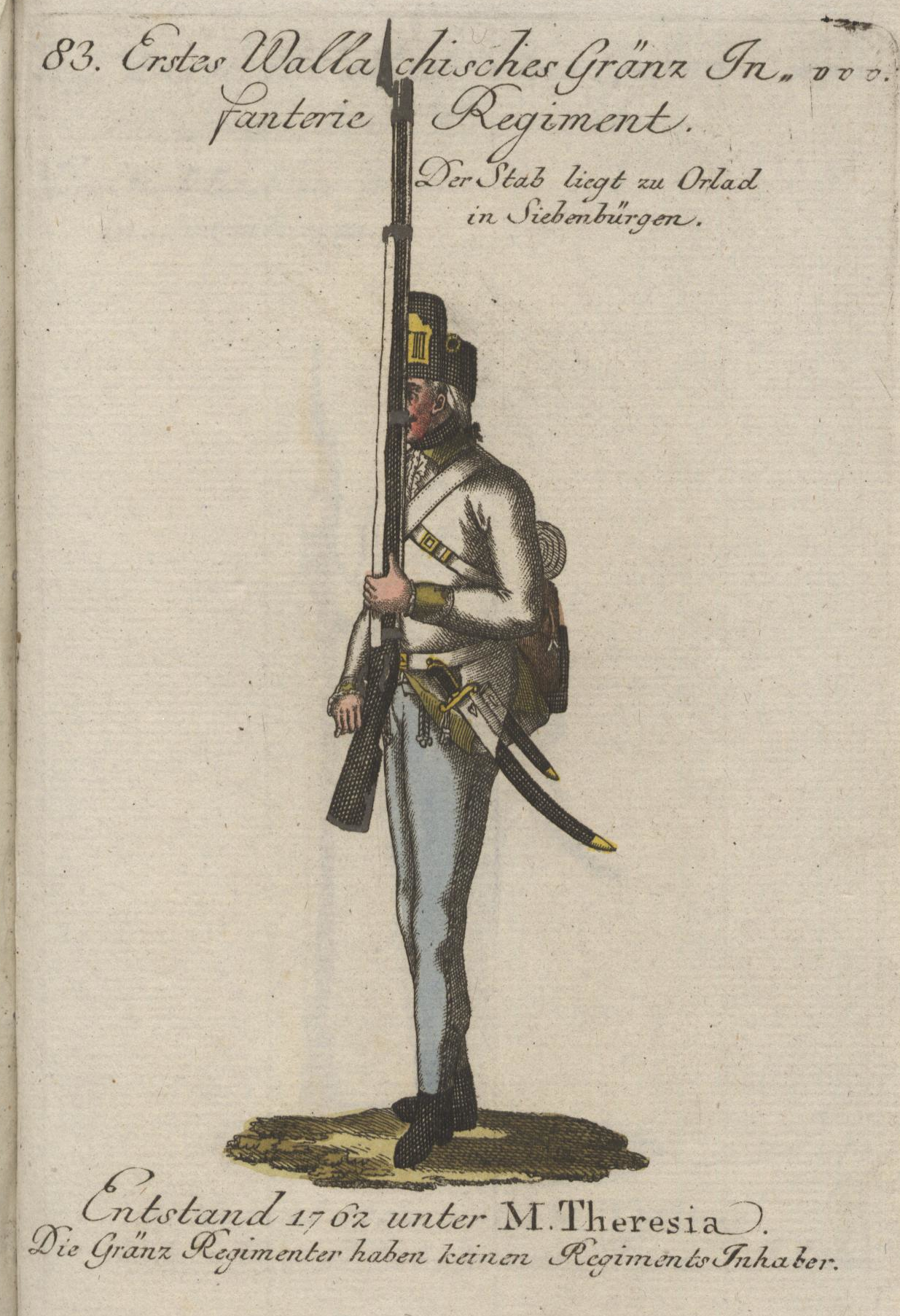
1st Romanian Regiment

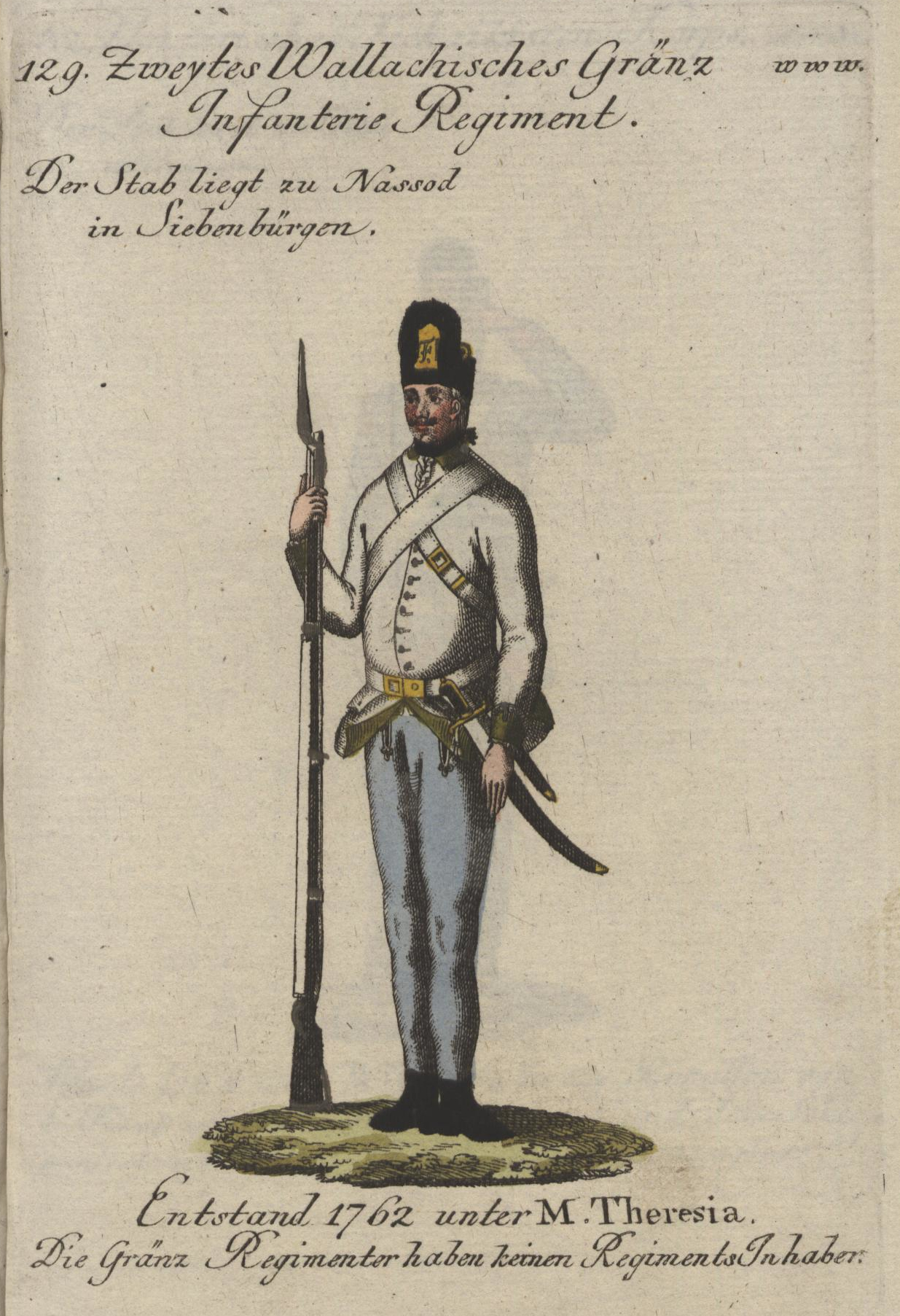
2nd Romanian Regiment

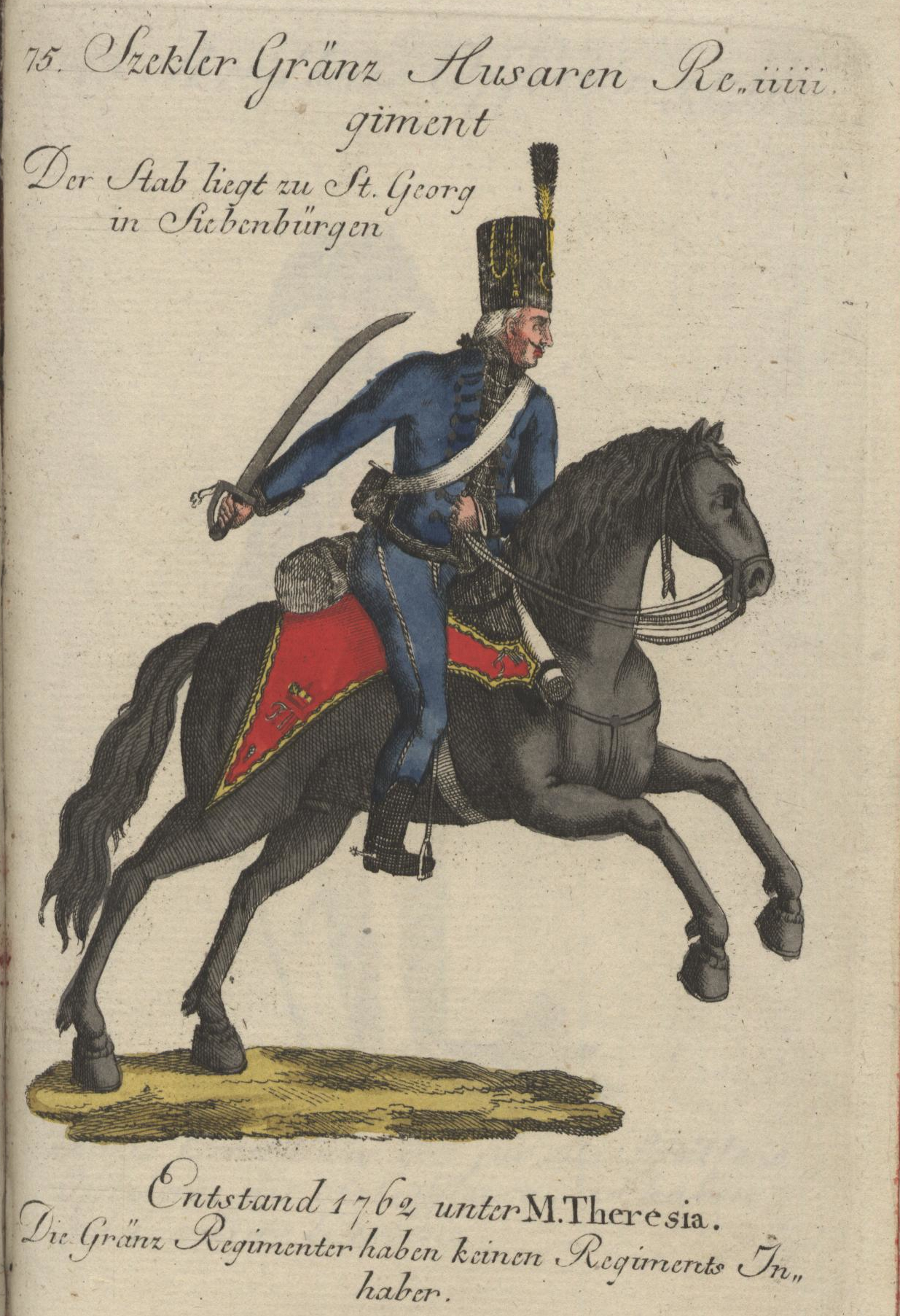
Székely Hussar Regiment

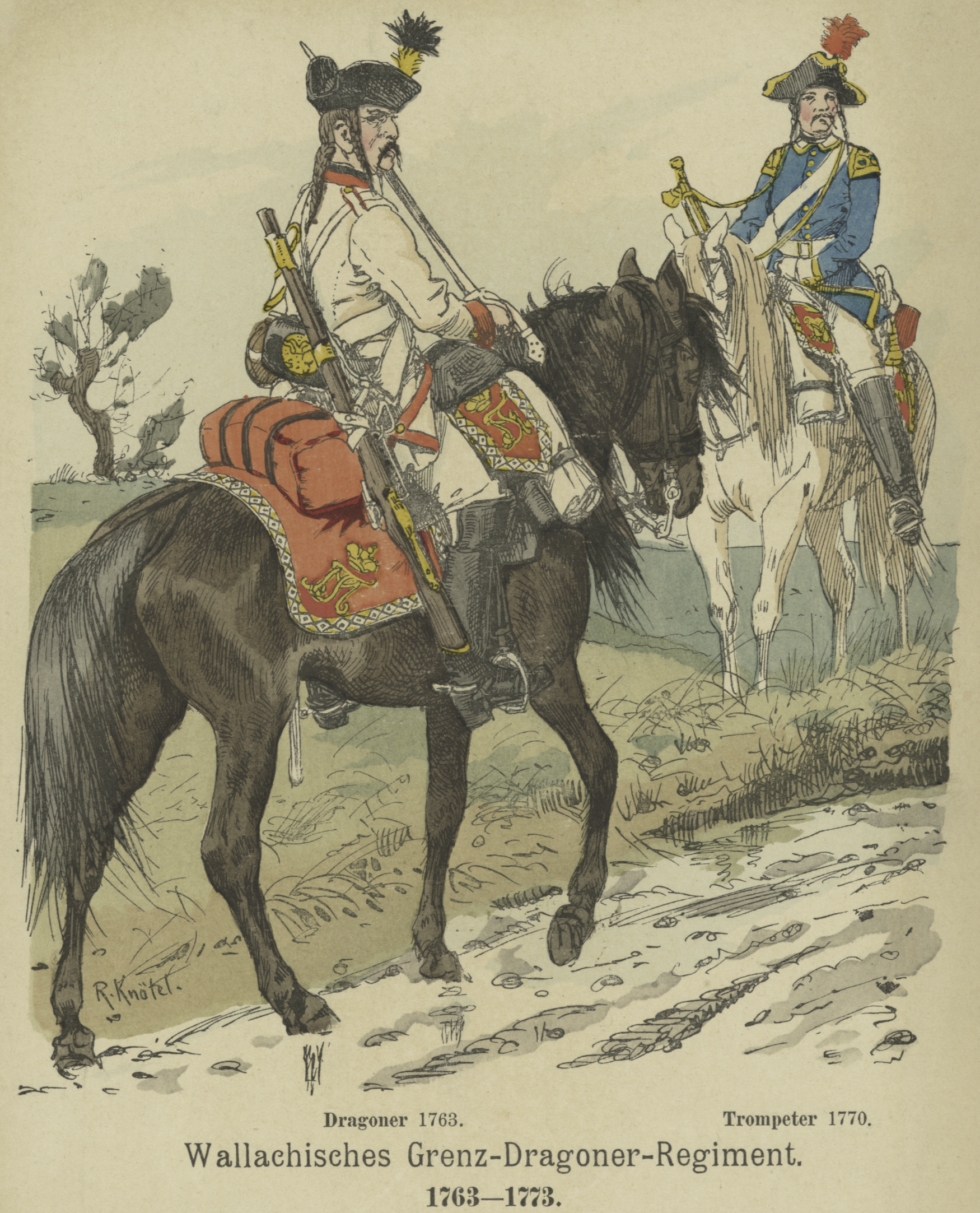
Romanian Dragoon Regiment

== See also ==
- Military Frontier
- Principality of Transylvania (1711–1867)
- History of Transylvania
- Transylvania
