= Tălmaciu =

- Town
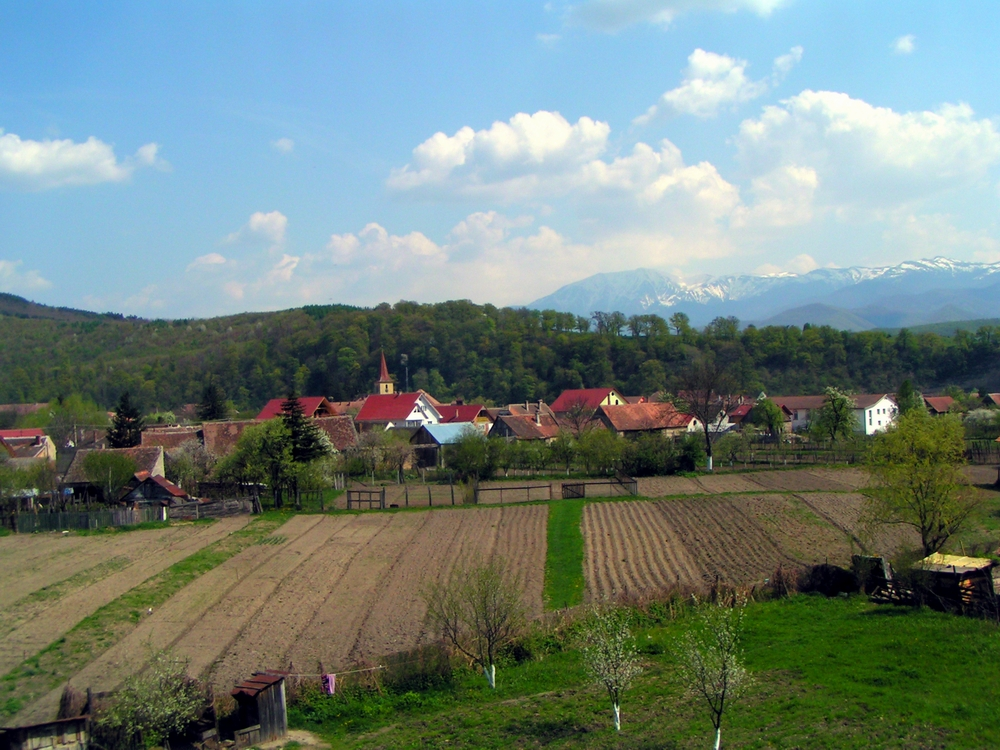

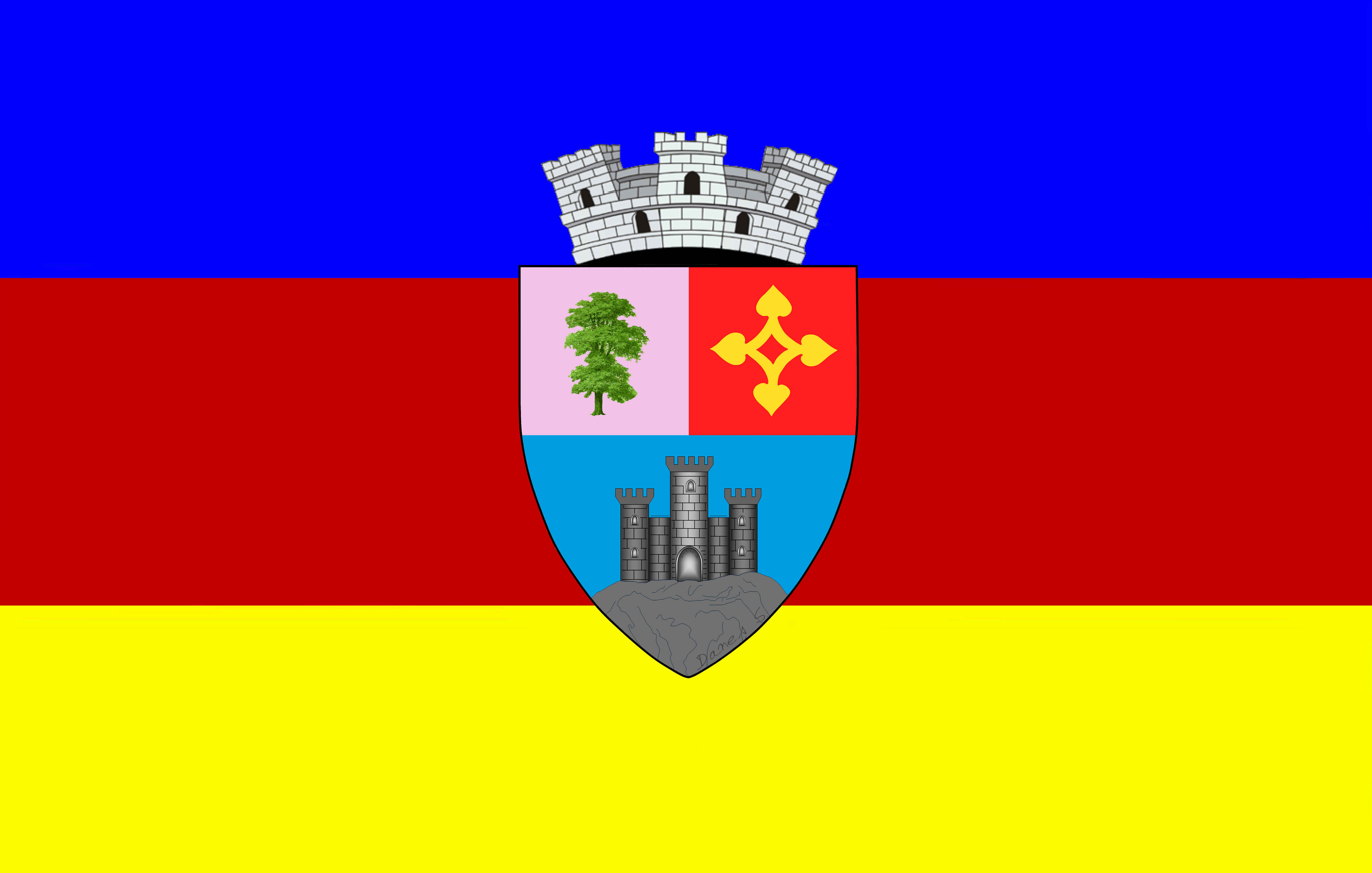
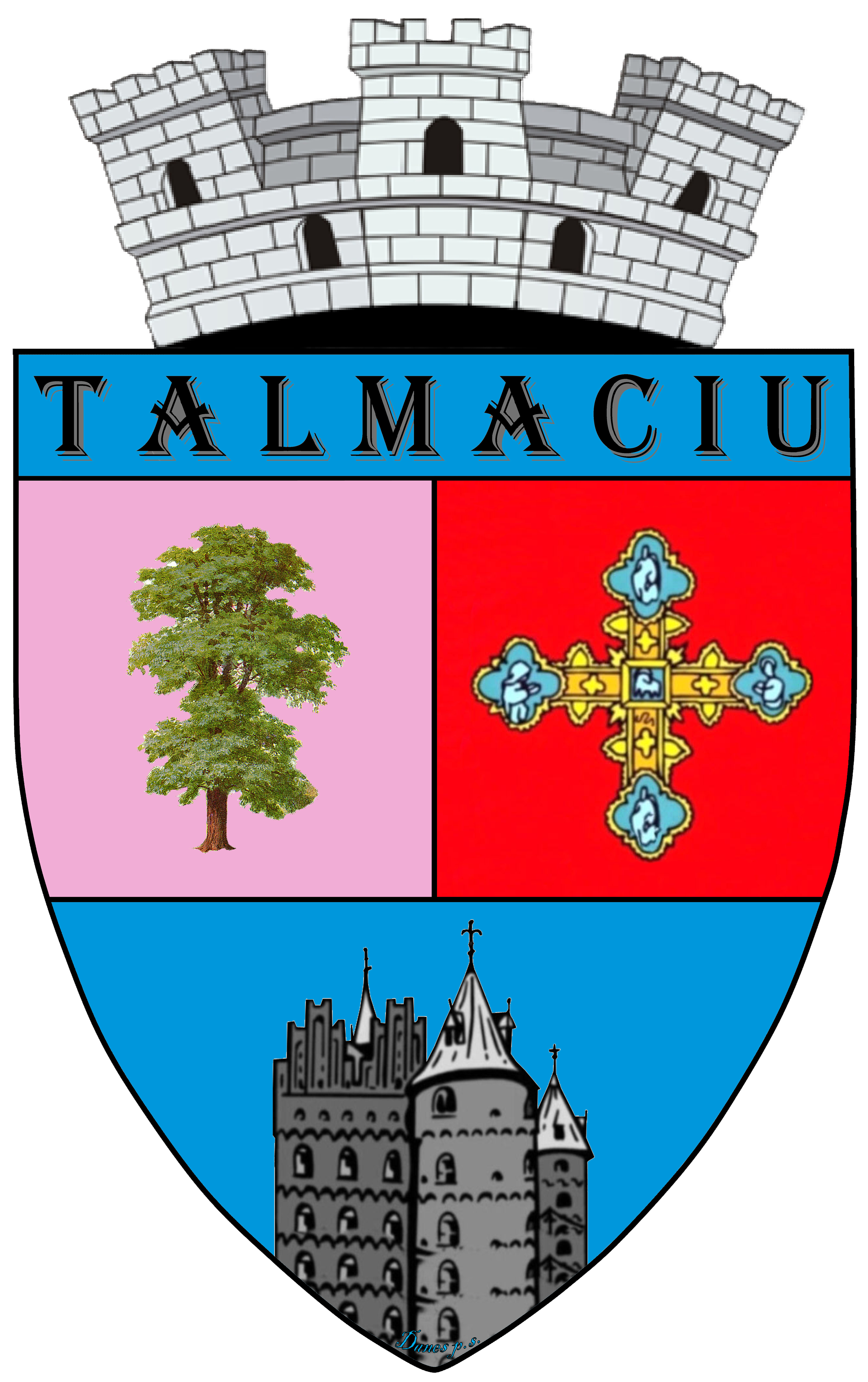
- Flag Coat of arms

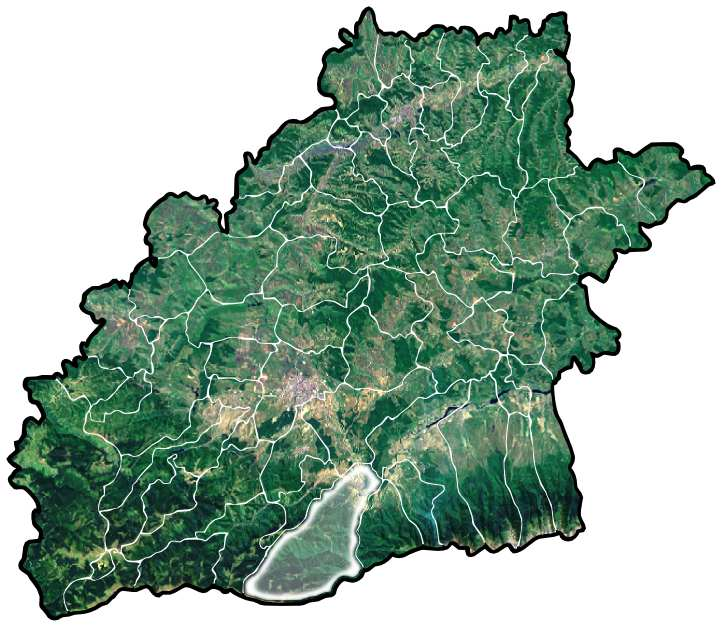
- Location in Sibiu County

- Location in Romania
- Coordinates: 45°40′0″N 24°15′40″E
- Country: Romania
- County: Sibiu

Government
  - Mayor (2024–2028): Ioan Oancea (PNL)
- Area: 128.29 km^{2} (49.53 sq mi)
- Elevation: 378 m (1,240 ft)
- Population (2021-12-01): 6,711
  - Density: 52.31/km^{2} (135.5/sq mi)
- Time zone: UTC+02:00 (EET)
  - Summer (DST): UTC+03:00 (EEST)
- Postal code: 555700
- Area code: (+40) 02 69
- Vehicle reg.: SB
- Website: talmaciu.ro

Tălmaciu (German: Talmesch; Hungarian: Nagytalmács) is a town in Sibiu County, in central Romania, 20 km (12 mi) south of the county seat, Sibiu. It lies on the eastern end of the Mărginimea Sibiului area.

== Geography ==
Tălmaciu is situated at the confluence of the Sadu and Cibin rivers, 2 km (1.2 mi) before the confluence of the Cibin with the Olt River. It lies on one of the main access routes between Transylvania and Wallachia, at the northern entrance of the Turnu Roșu Pass; the European route E81 passes through it. The town administers two villages:

- Colonia Tălmaciu (Feltrinellitelep), 3 km (1.9 mi) to the north;
- Tălmăcel (Kistalmács), 3 km (1.9 mi) to the west.

It also administered four other villages until 2004, when they were split off to form Boița Commune.

== Demographics ==
At the 2011 census, the town had a population of 6,527; of those, 95.3% were Romanians, 3.3% Roma, 0.8% Hungarians, and 0.6% Germans. At the 2021 census, Tălmaciu had 6,711 inhabitants.

Historical population
Year	Pop.	±%
1992	9,369	—
2002	9,147	−2.4%
2011	6,527	−28.6%
2021	6,711	+2.8%
Source: Census data

== History ==
The first documents referring to Tălmaciu (Tholmach) are from 1318. After the Saxon colonisation of Transylvania, Tălmaciu was the administrative center for the settlements of Tălmăcel, Boița, Turnul Roșu, Racovița, Sebeșul de Jos, and Plopi. After 1453 the administrative center was moved to Sibiu. It officially became a town in 1989, as a result of the Romanian rural systematization program.

Because using the Olt Pass to the south requires passing through Tălmaciu, it has witnessed numerous historical events:

- The Romans passed through during the battles between the troops of Emperor Trajan and King Decebalus of Dacia.
- 1599: Mihai Viteazu's troops regrouped here before the battle of Șelimbăr.
- 1848: the Czarist troops battled General Bem's army.
- 1916: the Romanian Army used the town to stage the battle for Sibiu.

On 29 August 1916, during the Battle of Transylvania, Tălmaciu (then part of the Hungarian half of Austria-Hungary) was occupied by General Ioan Culcer's Romanian 1st Army. The most powerful unit of the 1st Army was the I Corps. It was its only army corps and as such the only unit of the 1st Army to comprise multiple divisions. The I Corps was commanded by General Ioan Popovici. In the middle of September, Culcer moved the I Corps headquarters to Tălmaciu, to direct the operations of the two divisions located there. Popovici arrived in Tălmaciu along with his staff on 16 September. Tălmaciu was evacuated by the Romanians on 28 September, towards the end of the Battle of Nagyszeben. Tălmaciu also served as the air base for the 1st Army's squadron, consisting of (depending on source) 3 or 6 aircraft.

== Economy ==
Industrially, Tălmaciu is home to one of the most important thread manufacturers and spinners in Romania. There are also textile and lumber products manufacturers. The water flowing from the mountains is used for one of the most popular brand of bottled water in Romania: Fântâna.

== Image gallery ==
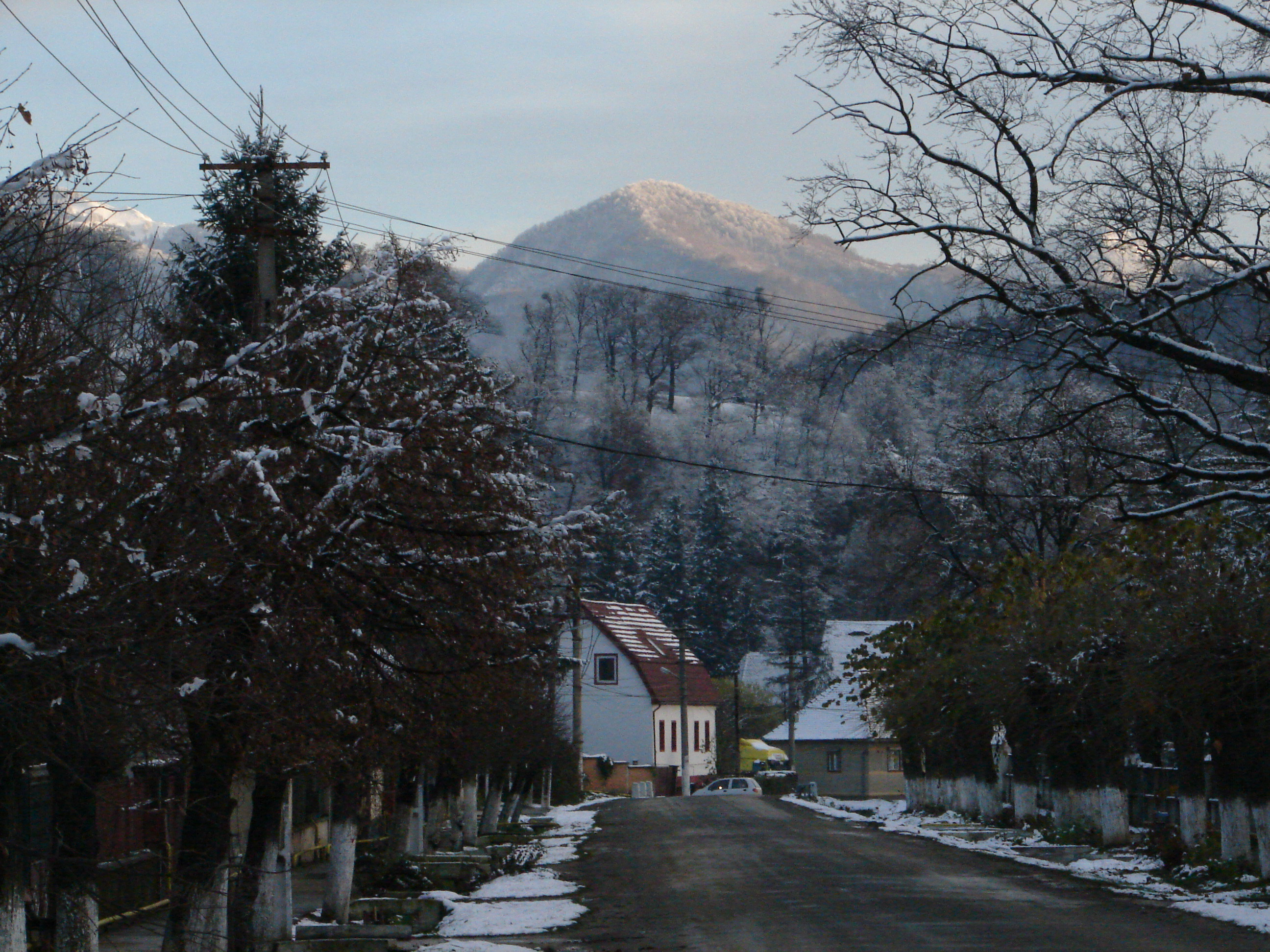
View of Tălmaciu

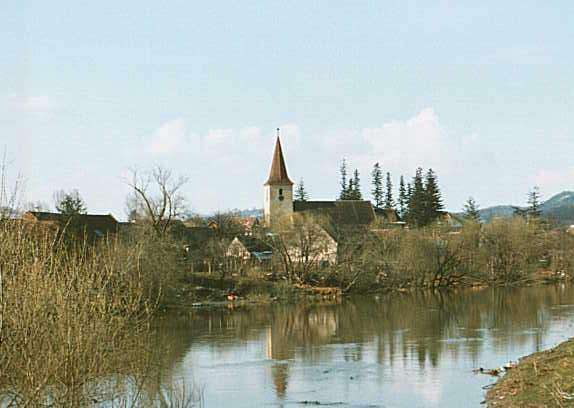
Saxon Lutheran church

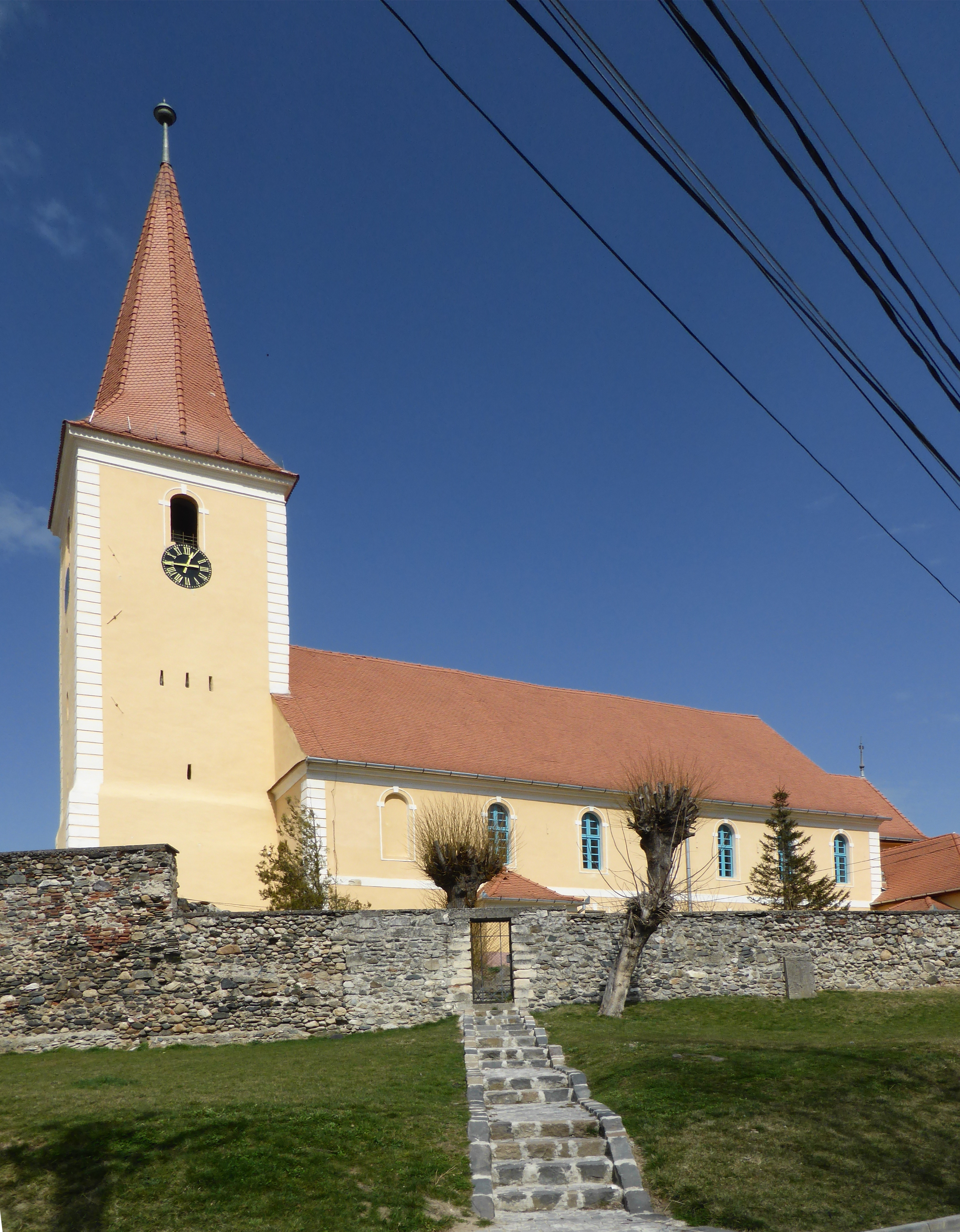
Saxon Lutheran Church

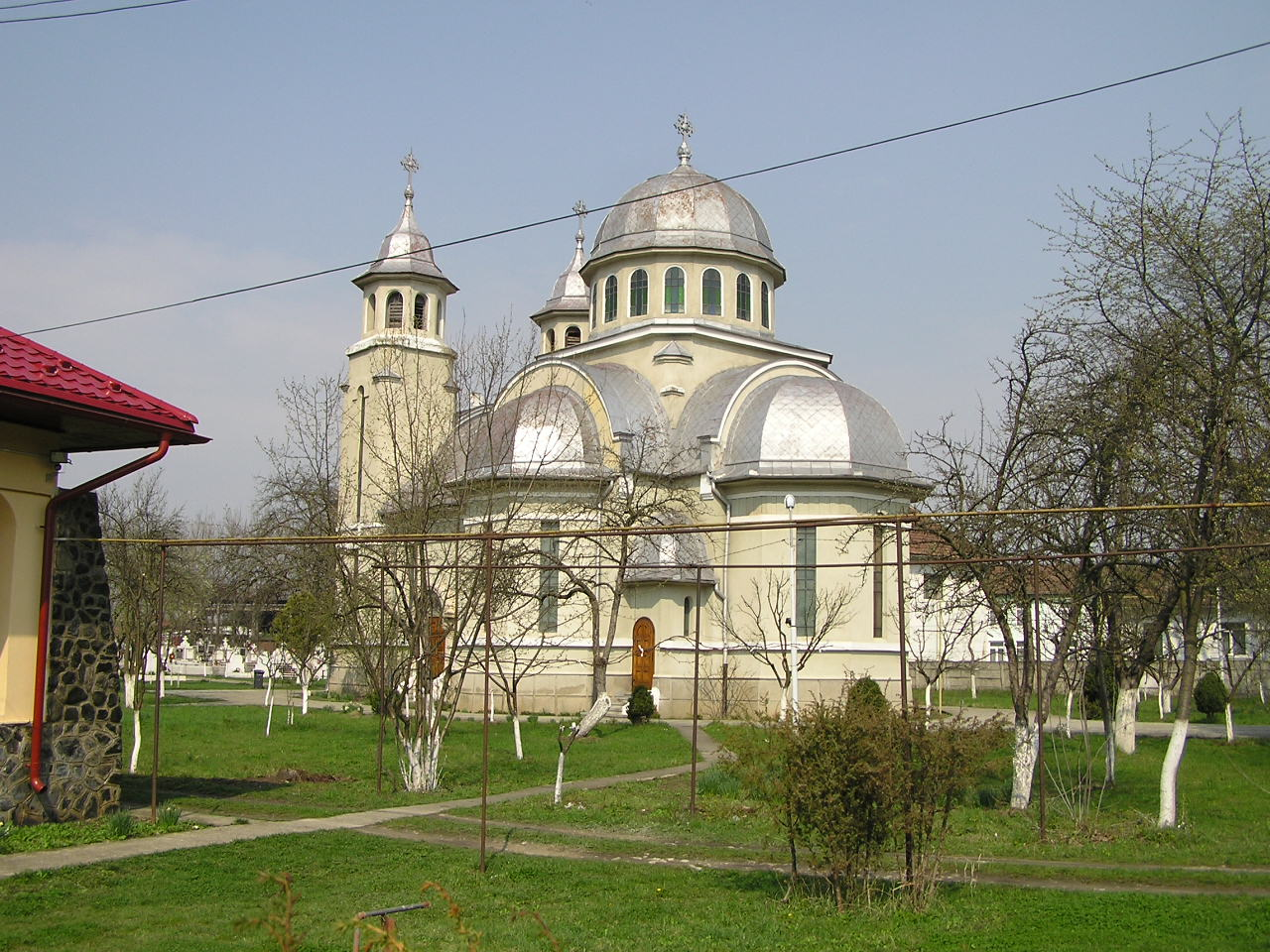
Romanian Orthodox Church

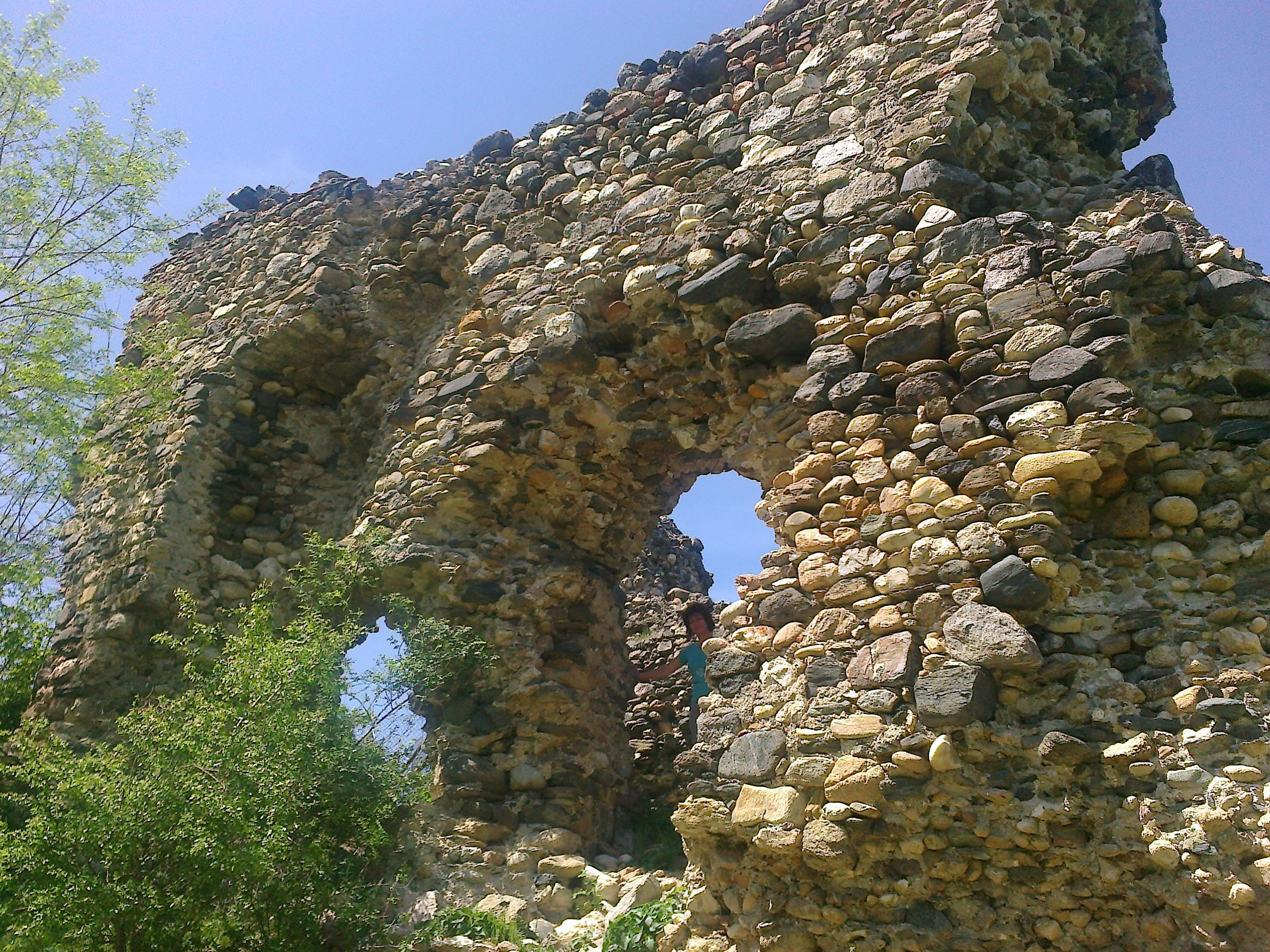
Ruins of Landskrone Castle
