= Valea Tocilelor =

- Location within Romania

Location
- Country: Romania
- Counties: Sibiu County

Physical characteristics
- Source: Confluence of headwaters Tocila Mare and Tocila Mică
  - location: Cindrel Mountains
  - coordinates: 45°40′42″N 24°09′07″E
  - elevation: 566 m (1,857 ft)
- Mouth: Cibin
  - location: Upstream of Veștem
  - coordinates: 45°43′32″N 24°14′00″E
  - elevation: 379 m (1,243 ft)
- Length: 13 km (8.1 mi)
- Basin size: 19 km^{2} (7.3 sq mi)

Basin features
- Progression: Cibin→ Olt→ Danube→ Black Sea
- Tributaries
  - right: Tocila Mică

The Valea Tocilelor (in its upper course: Tocila Mare) is a right tributary of the river Cibin in Romania. It discharges into the Cibin near Veștem. Its length is 13 km (8.1 mi) and its basin size is 19 km^{2} (7.3 sq mi).
