= Orlat =

- Commune
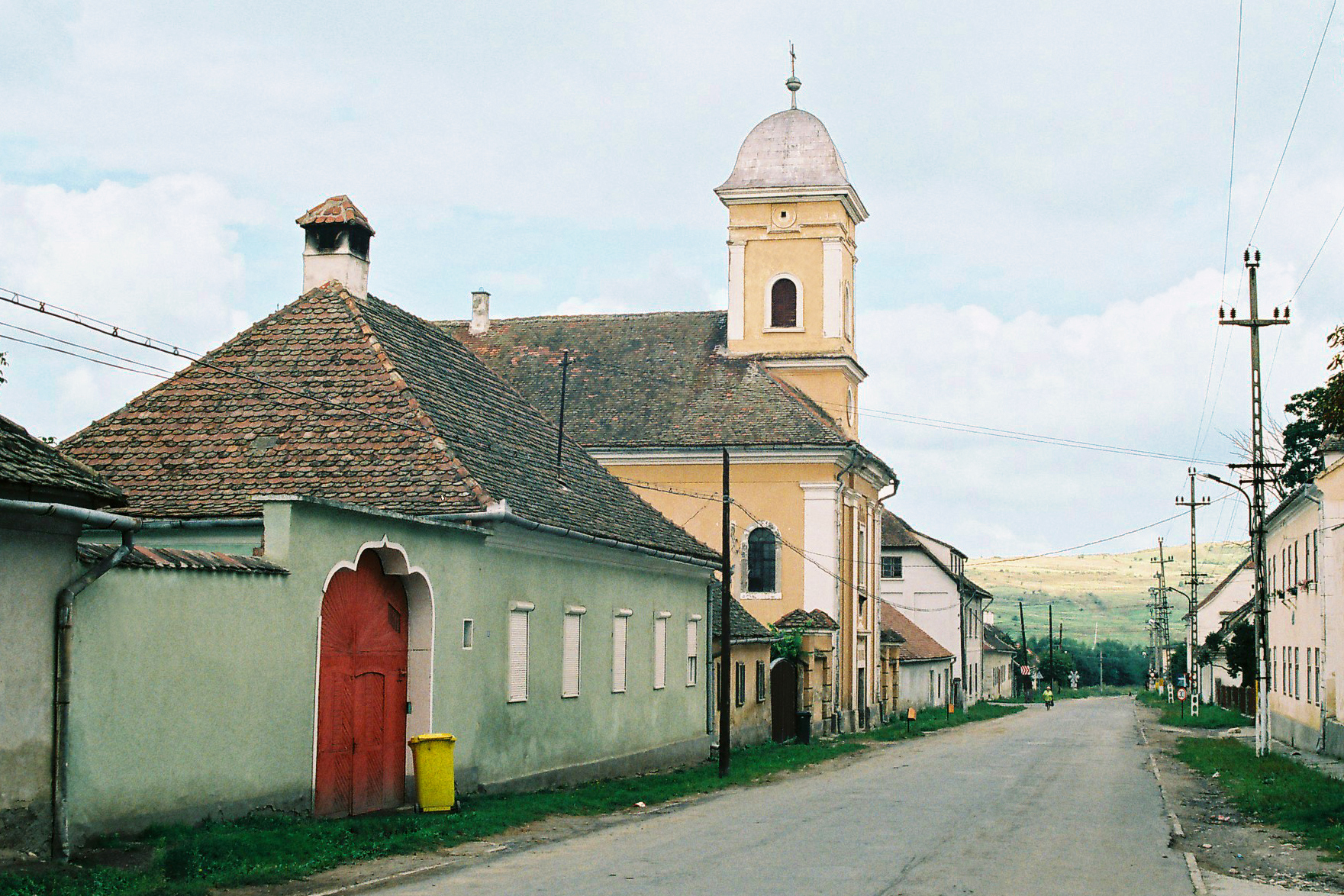
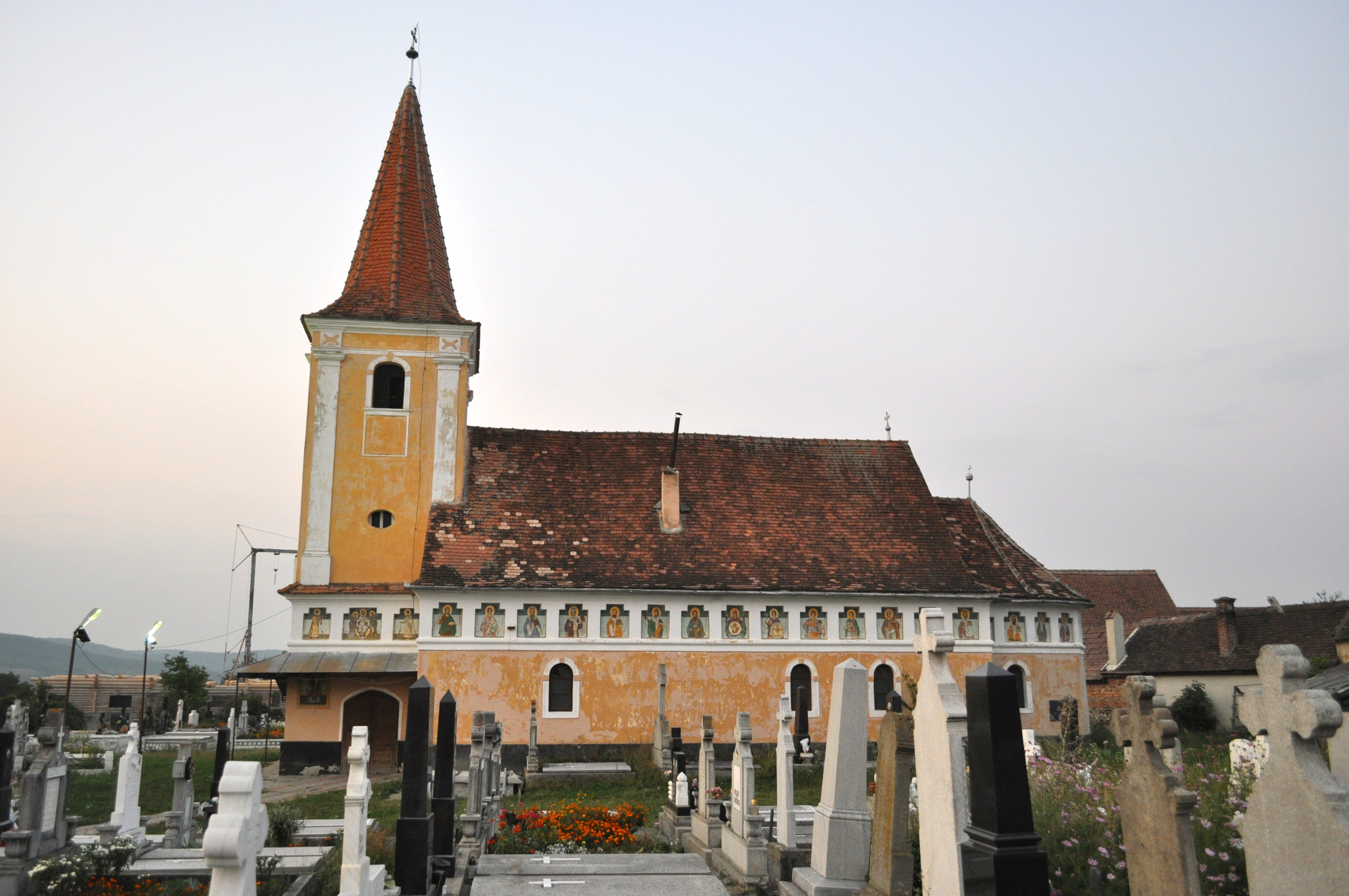
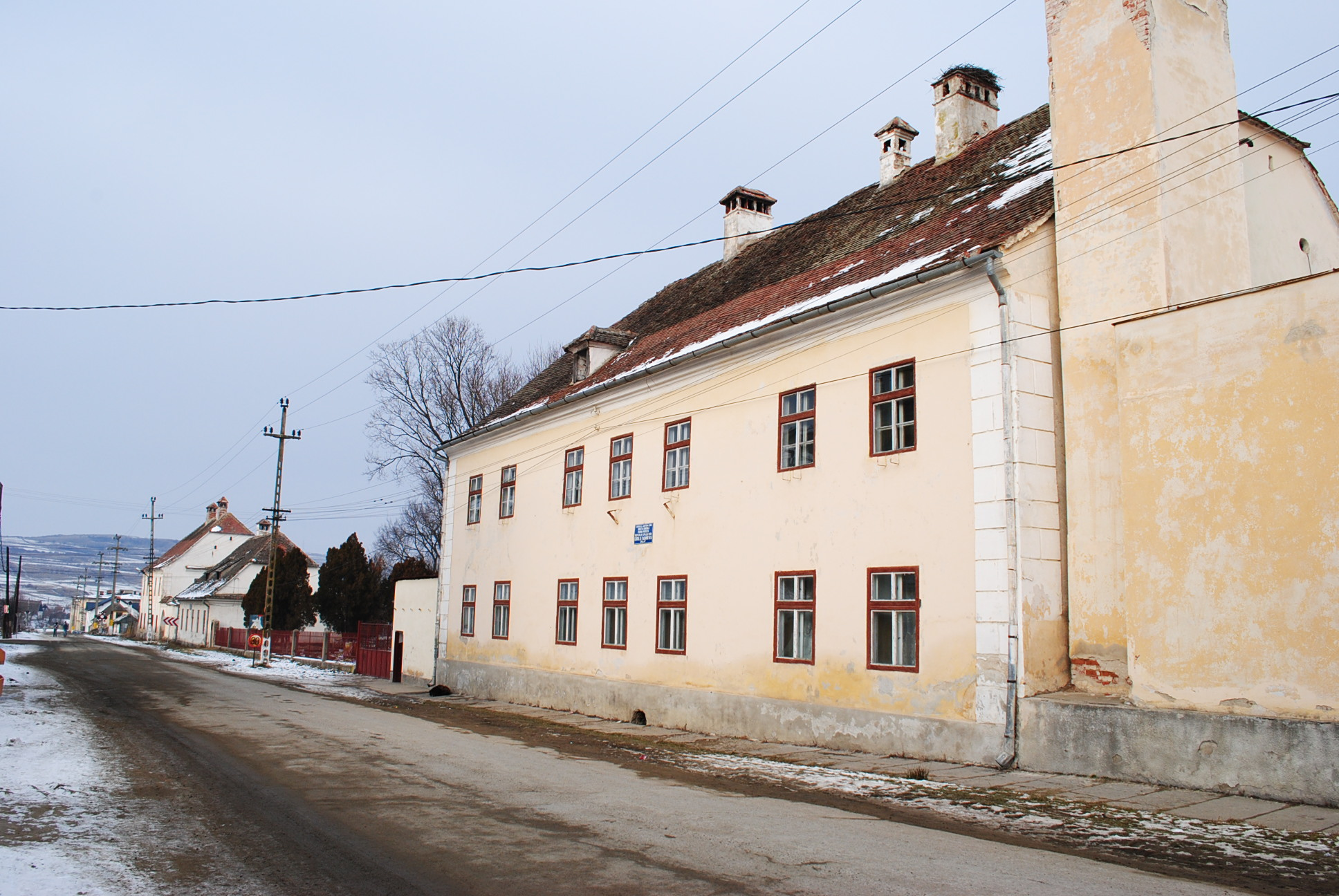
- Street in Orlat St. Nicholas Church The former headquarters of the 1st Romanian Border Guards Regiment

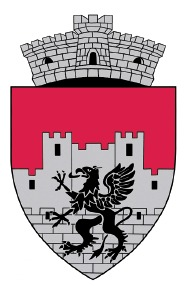
- Coat of arms

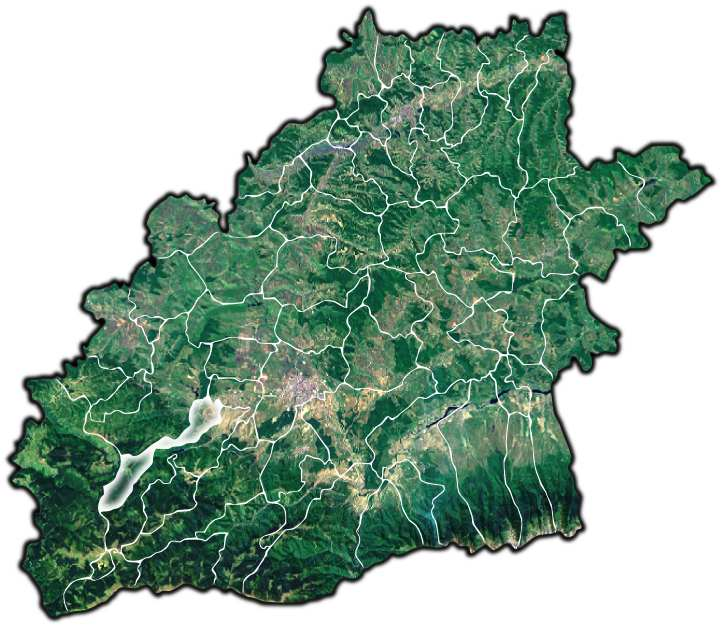
- Location in Sibiu County

- Location in Romania
- Coordinates: 45°45′5″N 23°58′2″E
- Country: Romania
- County: Sibiu

Government
  - Mayor (2020–2024): Aurel Gață (PNL)
- Area: 59.02 km^{2} (22.79 sq mi)
- Elevation: 486 m (1,594 ft)
- Population (2021-12-01): 2,964
  - Density: 50.22/km^{2} (130.1/sq mi)
- Time zone: UTC+02:00 (EET)
  - Summer (DST): UTC+03:00 (EEST)
- Postal code: 557170
- Area code: +(40) 0269
- Vehicle reg.: SB
- Website: comunaorlat.ro

Orlat (German: Winsberg; Hungarian: Orlát) is a commune in Sibiu County, Transylvania, Romania, 17 km (11 mi) west of the county capital, Sibiu, in the Mărginimea Sibiului ethnographic area. It is composed of a single village, Orlat.

The commune lies in the foothills of the Cindrel Mountains, on the banks of the river Cibin and its affluents, the rivers Săliște and Orlat.

Orlat is one of the oldest villages in the Mărginimea Sibiului. The 1st Romanian Border Guards Regiment (established by an Imperial decree signed by Maria Theresa of Austria on April 15, 1762) was located here. The regiment's mission was to guard the southern sector of the Transylvanian Military Frontier.

The A1 Motorway passes just north of the commune. The Orlat train station serves the CFR Line 200, which runs from Brașov to the Hungarian border at Curtici.

At the 2021 census, the commune had a population of 2,964, of which 90.86% were Romanians.
