= Râul Mic (Cibin) =

- Location within Romania

Location
- Country: Romania
- Counties: Sibiu County

Physical characteristics
- Source: Cindrel Mountains
- Mouth: Cibin
  - coordinates: 45.7071°N 23.8928°E
- Length: 13 km (8.1 mi)
- Basin size: 48 km^{2} (19 sq mi)

Basin features
- Progression: Cibin→ Olt→ Danube→ Black Sea
- Tributaries
  - right: Valea Rudarilor, Foltea, Valea Porcarului

The Râul Mic (in its upper course also: Valea Comenzii) is a left tributary of the river Cibin in Romania. Its source is in the Cindrel Mountains. It discharges into the Gura Râului Reservoir, which is drained by the Cibin. Its length is 13 km (8.1 mi) and its basin size is 48 km^{2} (19 sq mi).
