= Rășinari =

- Commune
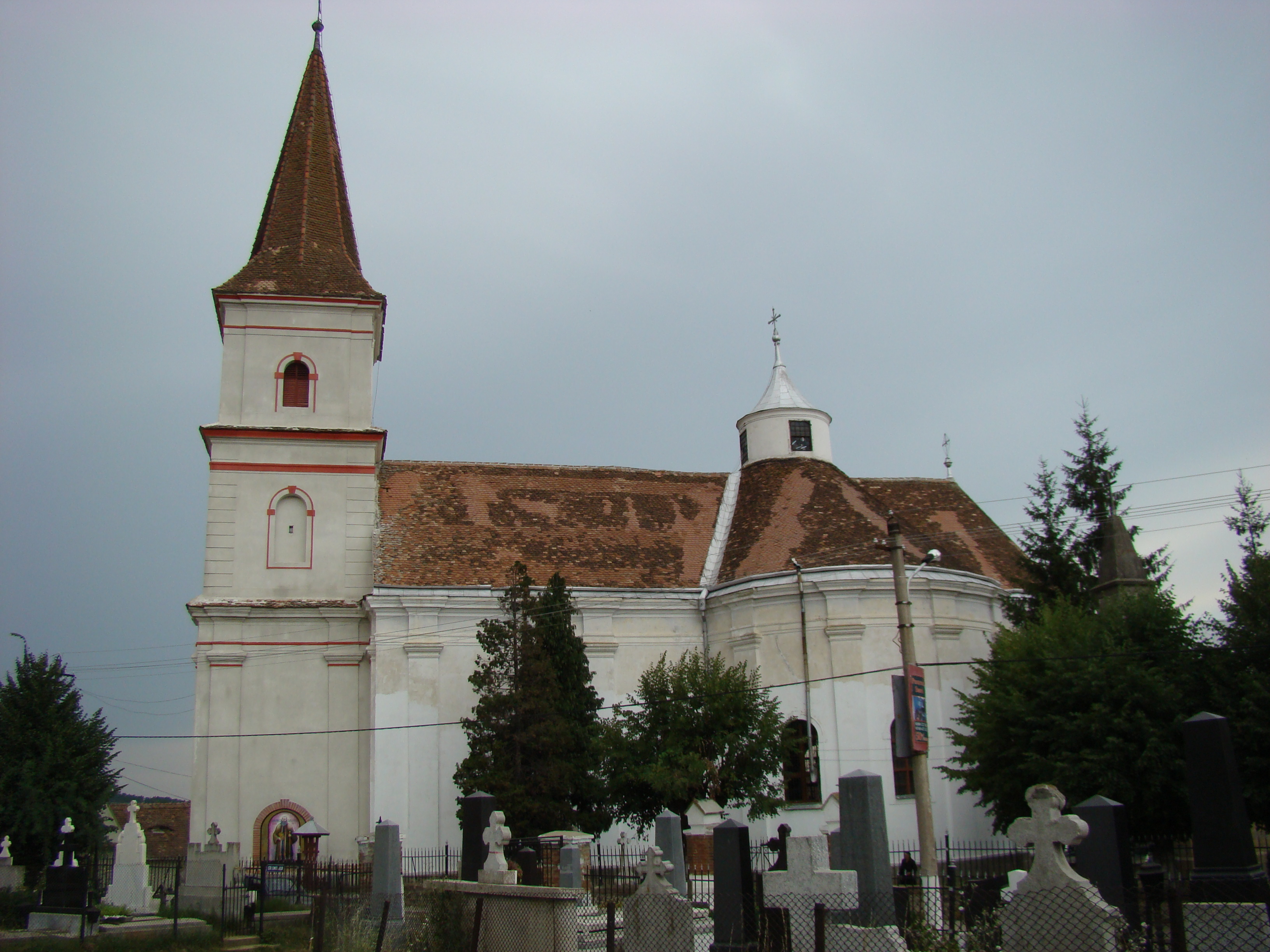
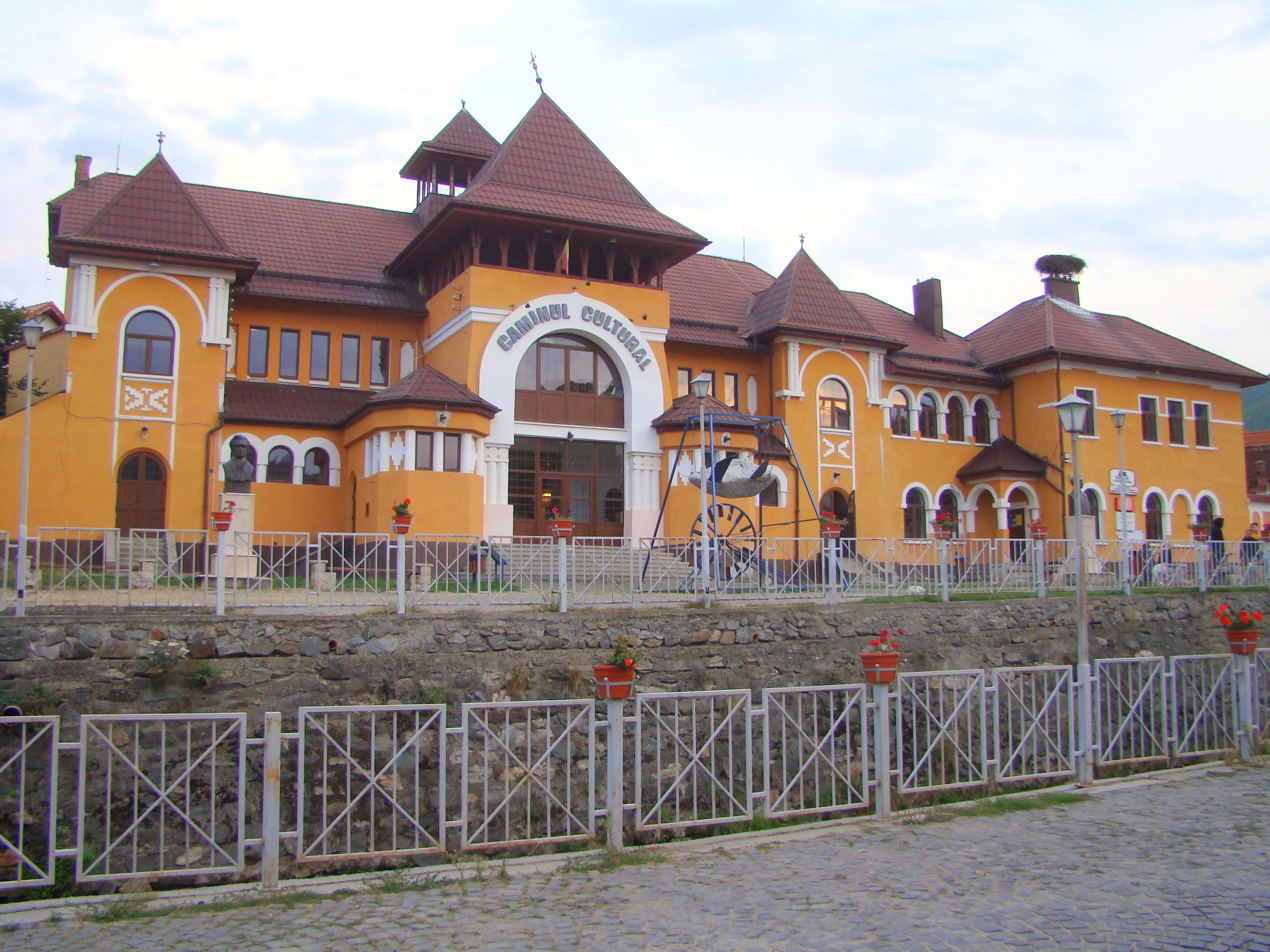
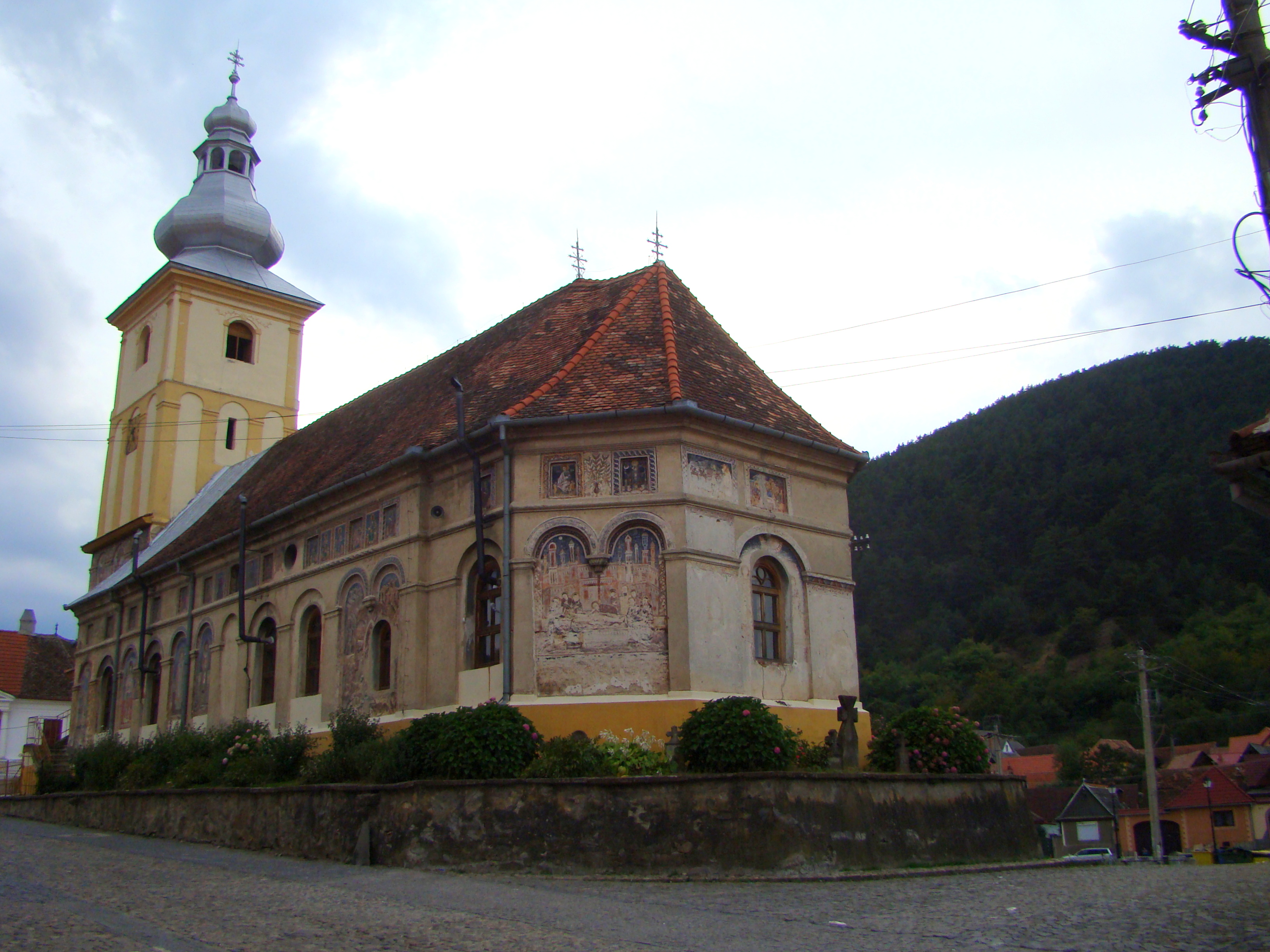
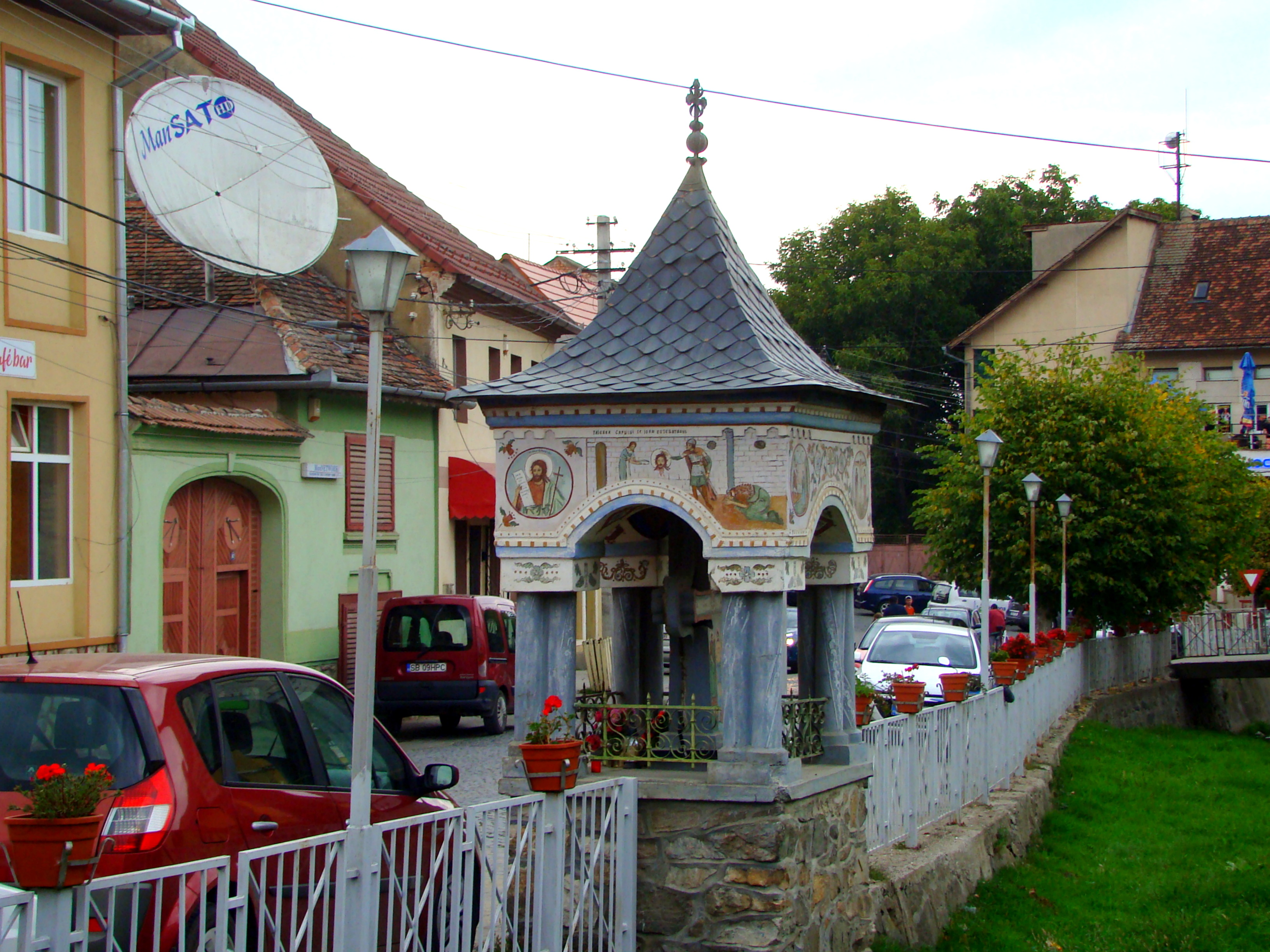
- From top, left to right: The "New Church"; Cultural Hall; Saint Parascheva Church; Stone cross

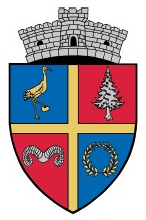
- Coat of arms

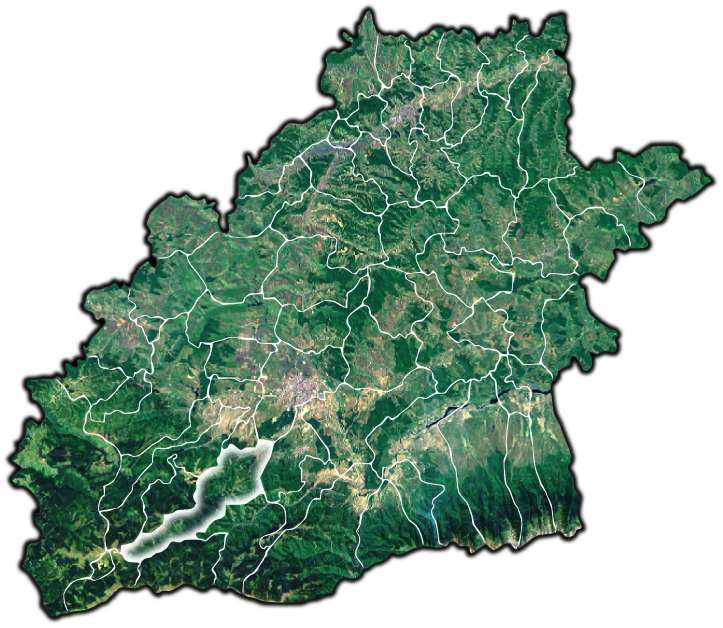
- Location in Sibiu County

- Location in Romania
- Coordinates: 45°42′N 24°04′E
- Country: Romania
- County: Sibiu

Government
  - Mayor (2020–2024): Bucur Bogdan (PNL)
- Area: 127.87 km^{2} (49.37 sq mi)
- Elevation: 574 m (1,883 ft)
- Population (2021-12-01): 5,362
  - Density: 41.93/km^{2} (108.6/sq mi)
- Time zone: UTC+02:00 (EET)
  - Summer (DST): UTC+03:00 (EEST)
- Postal code: 557200
- Area code: +(40) 0269
- Vehicle reg.: SB
- Website: www.primaria-rasinari.ro

Rășinari (German: Städterdorf; Hungarian: Resinár) is a commune in Sibiu County, Transylvania, Romania. It has a population of 5,362 inhabitants as of 2021 and is composed of two villages, Prislop (Priszloptelep) and Rășinari.

Until 2012, Rășinari was connected to Sibiu by a roughly 8-km tram line through the Dumbrava Forest, but regular service ended in 2011 and since 2013 much of the line has since been dismantled.

== History ==
In the second half of the 18th century, the Rășinari Orthodox bishops' residence was built - the first one of its kind in Transylvania. Today the pastoral traditions of the village are incorporated in the new modern rhythm of life.

=== Tram line ===
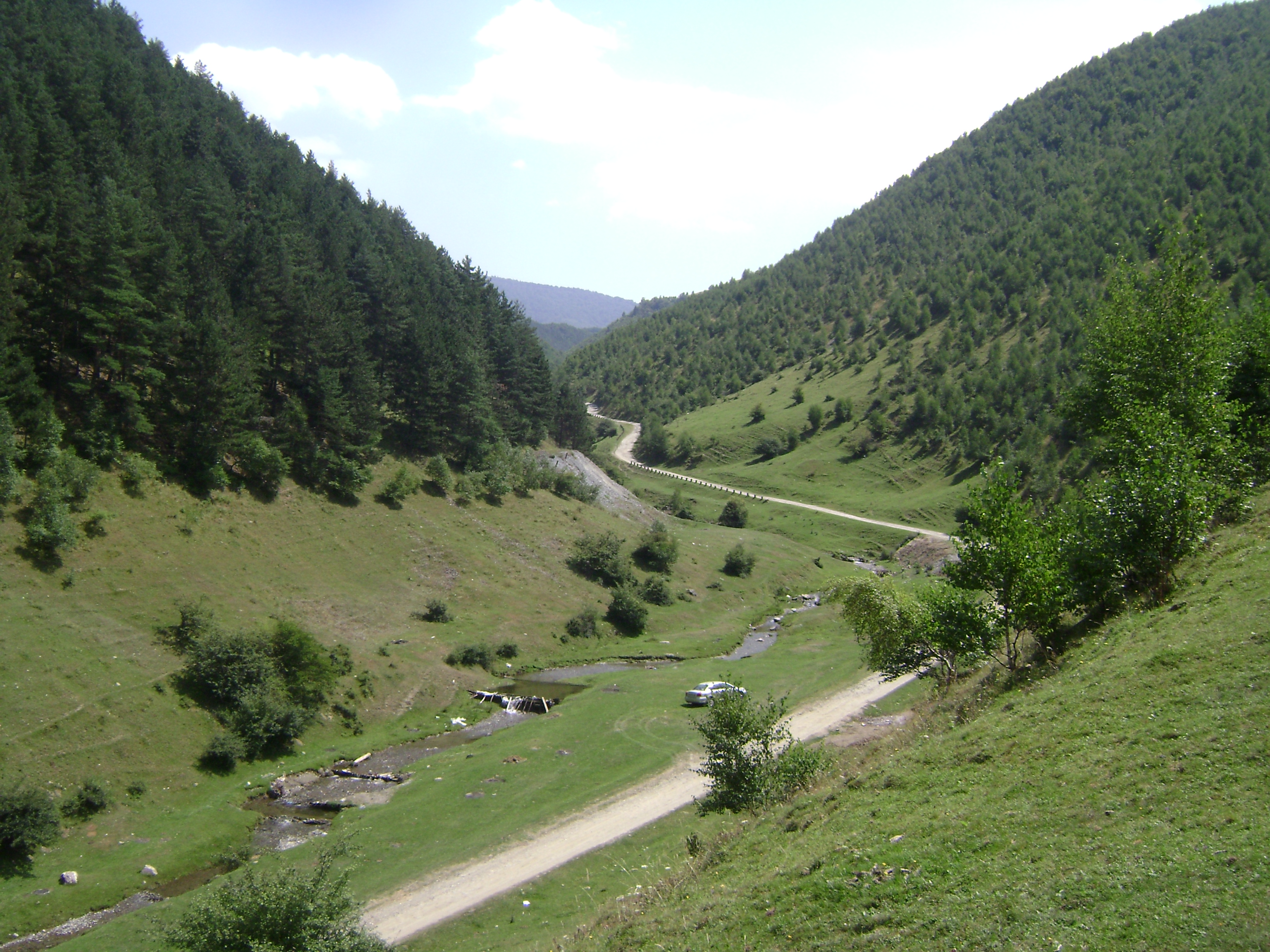
Sebeșel Valley, Rășinari

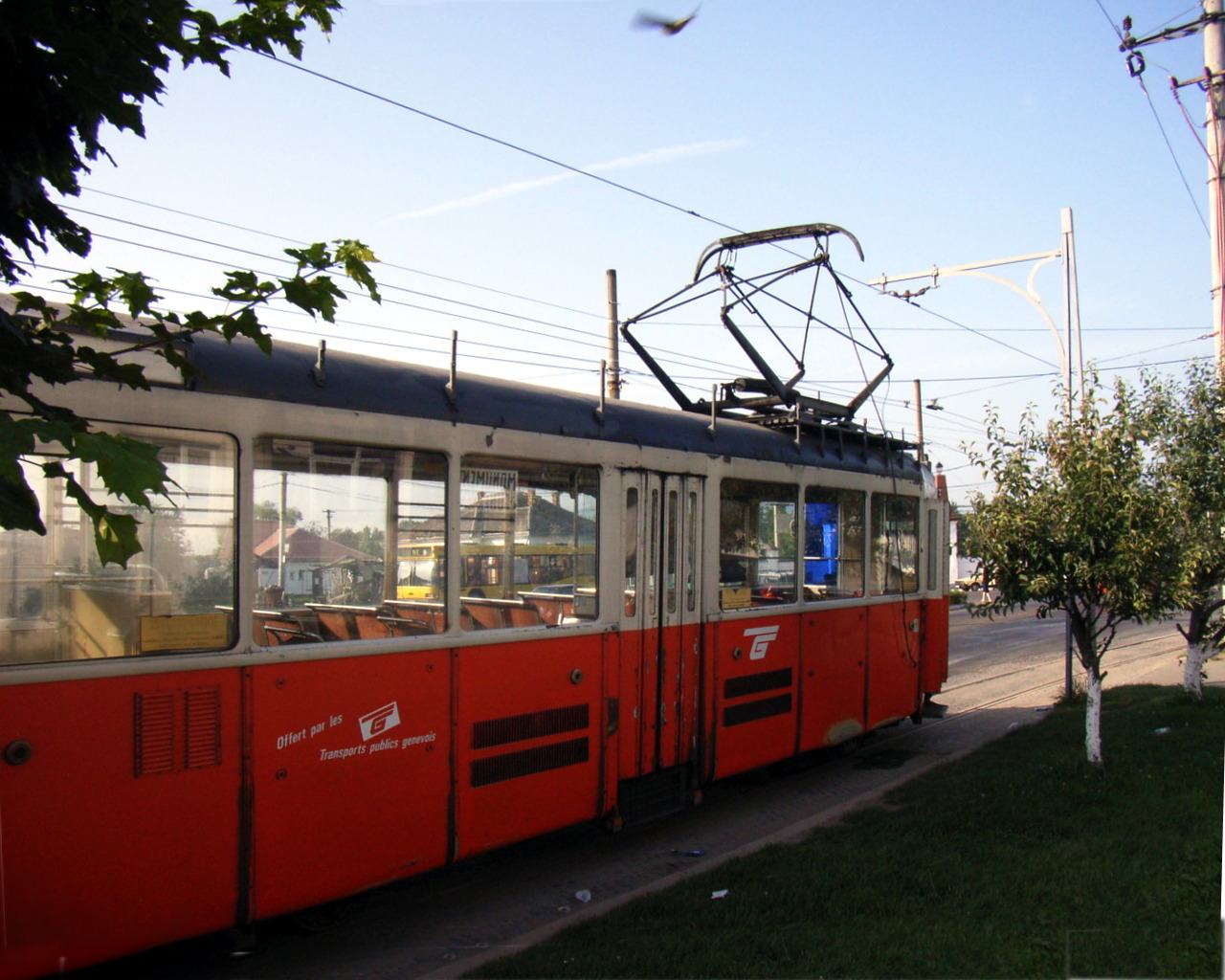
Sibiu–Rășinari tram

From 1947, Rășinari was linked to Sibiu by an electric tram line which crossed Dumbrava Forest, but service became sporadic in the late 2000s and ceased entirely on 28 February 2011. Very limited operation that took place later – mainly only for visiting tourist groups – ended in 2012, followed in 2013 by the start of work to dismantle the line. It is hoped to reopen a portion as a heritage tramway. The trams in use since the mid-1990s were formerly used in Geneva and retained their French-language signs. In 2013, they were sold to Rășinari for a low price and moved to the Rășinari end of the tram line, just before work to remove the tracks and overhead trolley wires began. Officials in Rășinari are attempting to obtain funding to build a small depot (carhouse) and to reopen a portion of the line as a tourist attraction.

In 2018, the tram line between Rășinari and Dumbrava Zoo was reopened for visitors' use.

== Demographics ==
The 1930 census registered 5,281 inhabitants, of which 5,229 were Romanian, 32 Gypsies, 13 Germans, and 4 Hungarians. At the 2002 census, roughly the same percentages were maintained, with 5,529 inhabitants registered. At the 2021 census, Rășinari had a population of 5,362; of those, 87.75% were Romanians and 5.26% Roma.

== Prislop ==
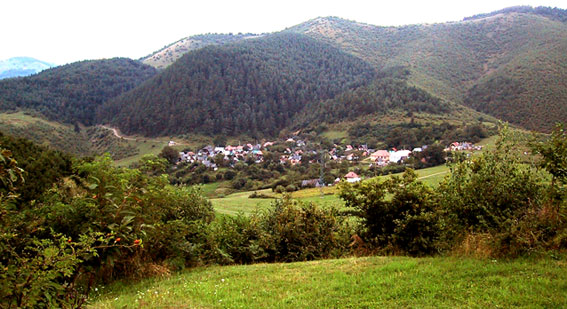
Prislop village

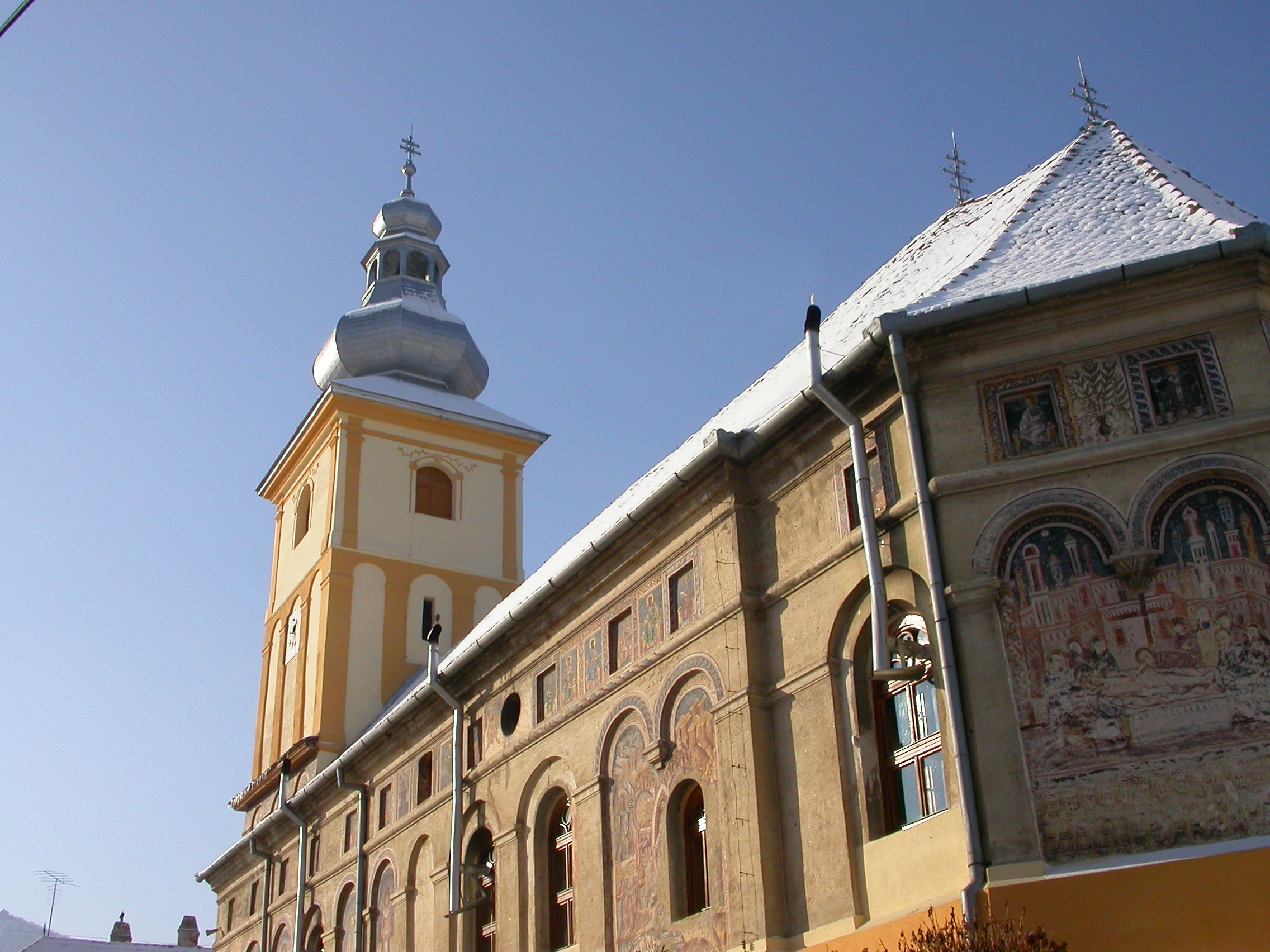
Holy Trinity Orthodox church

Prislop village has around 300 residents (as of 2010), of whom about 15 are ethnic Romanians and the rest Roma. However, at the 2002 census, the latter declared as Romanians, as they speak Romanian and not Romani. This caused the village to miss out on the opportunity to apply for European Union funds for Roma integration. There is one school from kindergarten to 4th grade; pupils who finish can go on through 8th grade in Rășinari.

== Sights ==
- Andrei Șaguna monument
- St. Parascheva Church
- Octavian Goga memorial house
- The ruins of the medieval fortress of Cetățuia Citadel
- Ethnographic museum
- Ward museum (set up in the former residence of the bishops)

== Natives ==
- Daniil Popovici-Barcianu (1847–1903), teacher, naturalist, and political activist
- Sava Barcianu-Popovici (1814–1879), priest, corresponding member of the Romanian Academy
- Traian Bratu (1875–1940), scholar of German language and literature
- Eugen Brote (1850–1912), agronomist and politician
- Emil Cioran (1911–1995), philosopher and essayist
- Octavian Goga (1881–1938), poet, playwright, and politician
- Ioan Ilcuș (1882–1977), lieutenant general and Defense Minister
- Ilarie Mitrea (1842–1904), military doctor and explorer
- Nicolae Ștefănuță (born 1982), politician
- Stan Vidrighin (1876–1956), engineer and Mayor of Timișoara
