= Cibin =

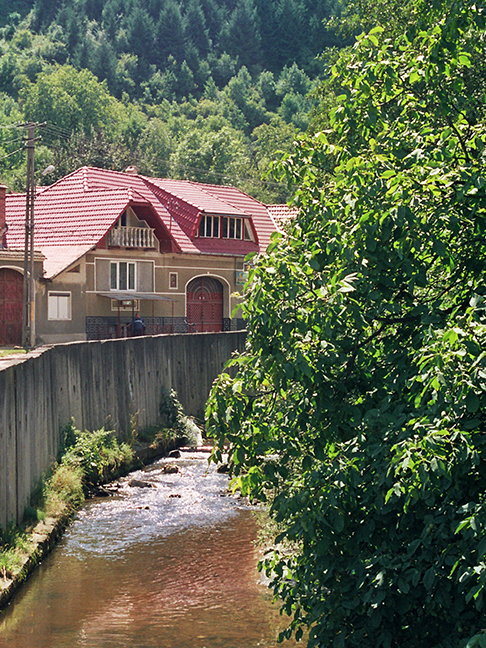
- The Cibin at Gura Râului

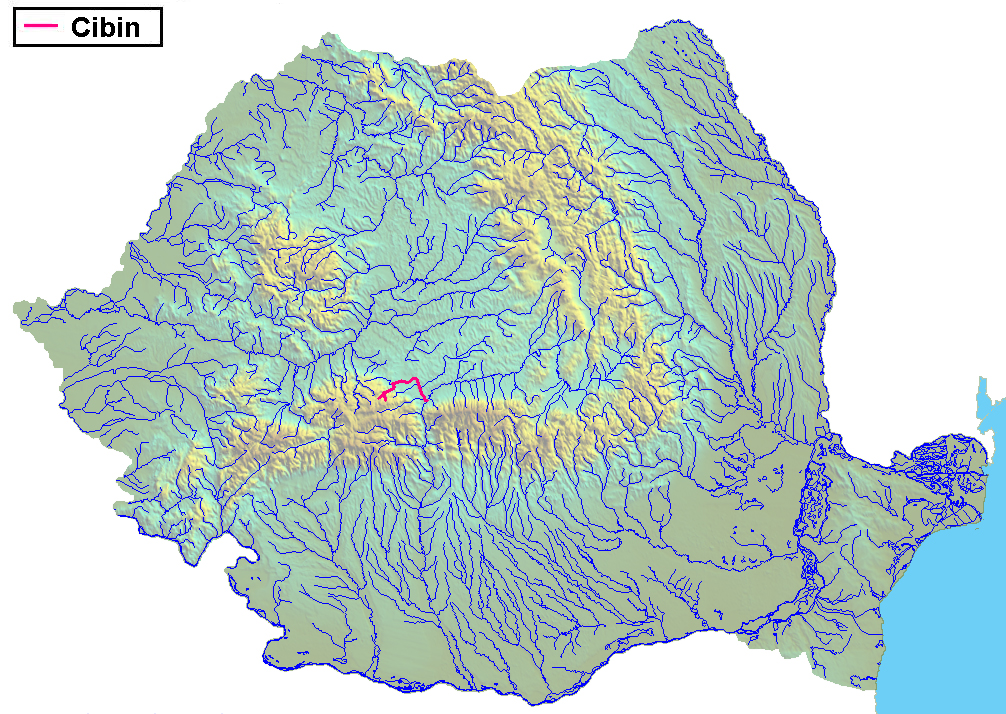

Location
- Country: Romania
- Counties: Sibiu County
- Towns: Sibiu

Physical characteristics
- Source: Cindrel Mountains
- Mouth: Olt
  - location: near Tălmaciu
  - coordinates: 45°38′51″N 24°17′29″E
- Length: 82 km (51 mi)
- Basin size: 2,194 km^{2} (847 sq mi)
- Discharge
  - location: mouth
  - average: 14.7 m^{3}/s (520 cu ft/s)

Basin features
- Progression: Olt→ Danube→ Black Sea
- Tributaries
  - left: Săliște, Hârtibaciu
  - right: Sadu

The Cibin (German: Zibin; Hungarian: Szeben) is a river in central Romania, in the south part of Transylvania. Its source is close to the highest peak in the Cindrel Mountains (known also as Cibin Mountains) of the Southern Carpathian Mountains. Upstream from its confluence with the Râul Mic, the river is also called the Râul Mare. The river flows entirely in Sibiu County.

The Cibin is an important tributary of the river Olt, flowing into it near Tălmaciu, in the immediate vicinity of the Podu Olt railway station. Its length is 82 km (51 mi) and its basin size is 2,194 km^{2} (847 sq mi).

The river forms the depression (Sibiu Depression) in which lies the city of Sibiu, through which it flows. Close to the mountains, the river flows through the Mărginimea Sibiului area, known for its strong Romanian traditions. Two of the biggest communes of Sibiu County – Gura Râului and Orlat – are situated on the river banks.

The economical importance or the river comes from the dam close to Gura Râului, which, besides generating electrical power, represents the biggest source of drinking water for the city of Sibiu. Also a few construction aggregate quarries stations are situated on the river.

== Tributaries ==
The following rivers are tributaries to the river Cibin (from source to mouth):

Left: Râul Mic, Breaza, Săliște (near Orlat), Rusciori, Fărmăndola, Hârtibaciu (near Veștem)

Right: Niculești, Măciuca, Crăciuneasa, Izvorul de la Degnaza, Păltiniș, Valea Cărbunarului, Valea Mare, Mărăjdia Veche, Valea Lupului, Valea Aurie, Valea Săpunului, Sebeș, Cisnădie, Valea Tocilelor, Valea Sărății, Sadu (near Tălmaciu), Lungșoara

== Gallery ==
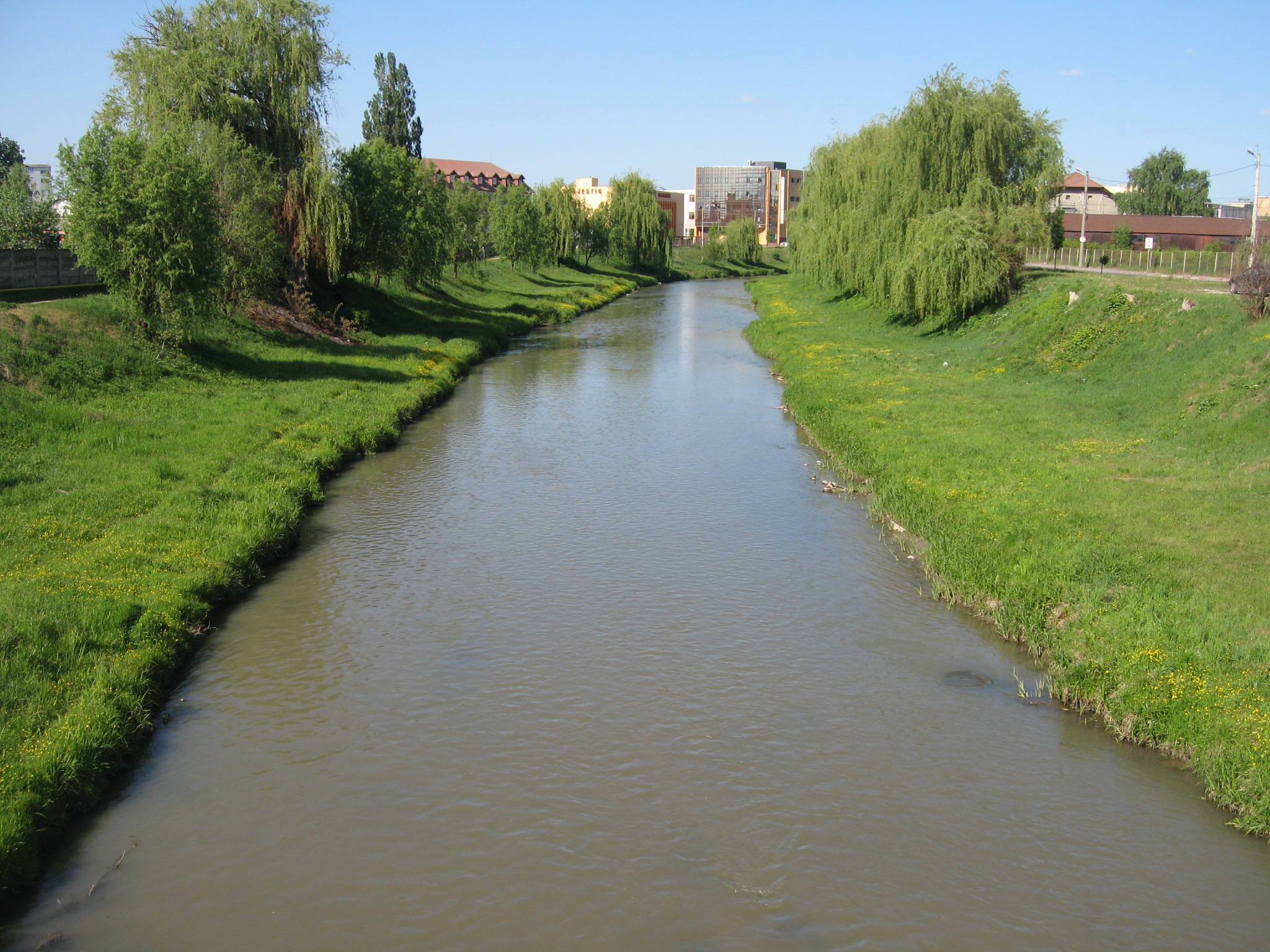
Cibin River, at the passing in the city of Sibiu.
