= Church on the Hill (Cluj-Napoca) =

Heritage site in Cluj County, Romania

Coordinates: 46°45′55″N 23°35′20″E

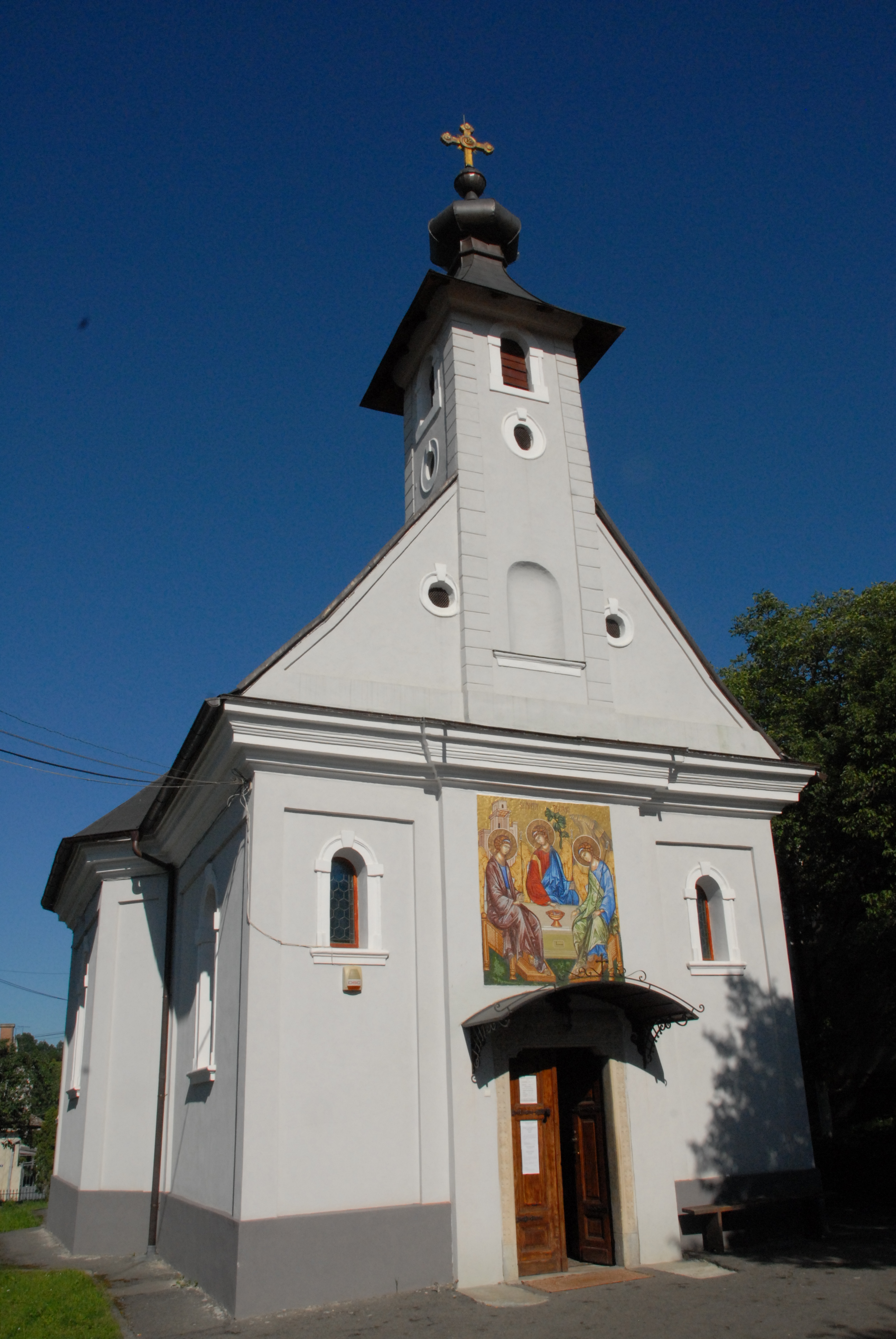
Church on the Hill

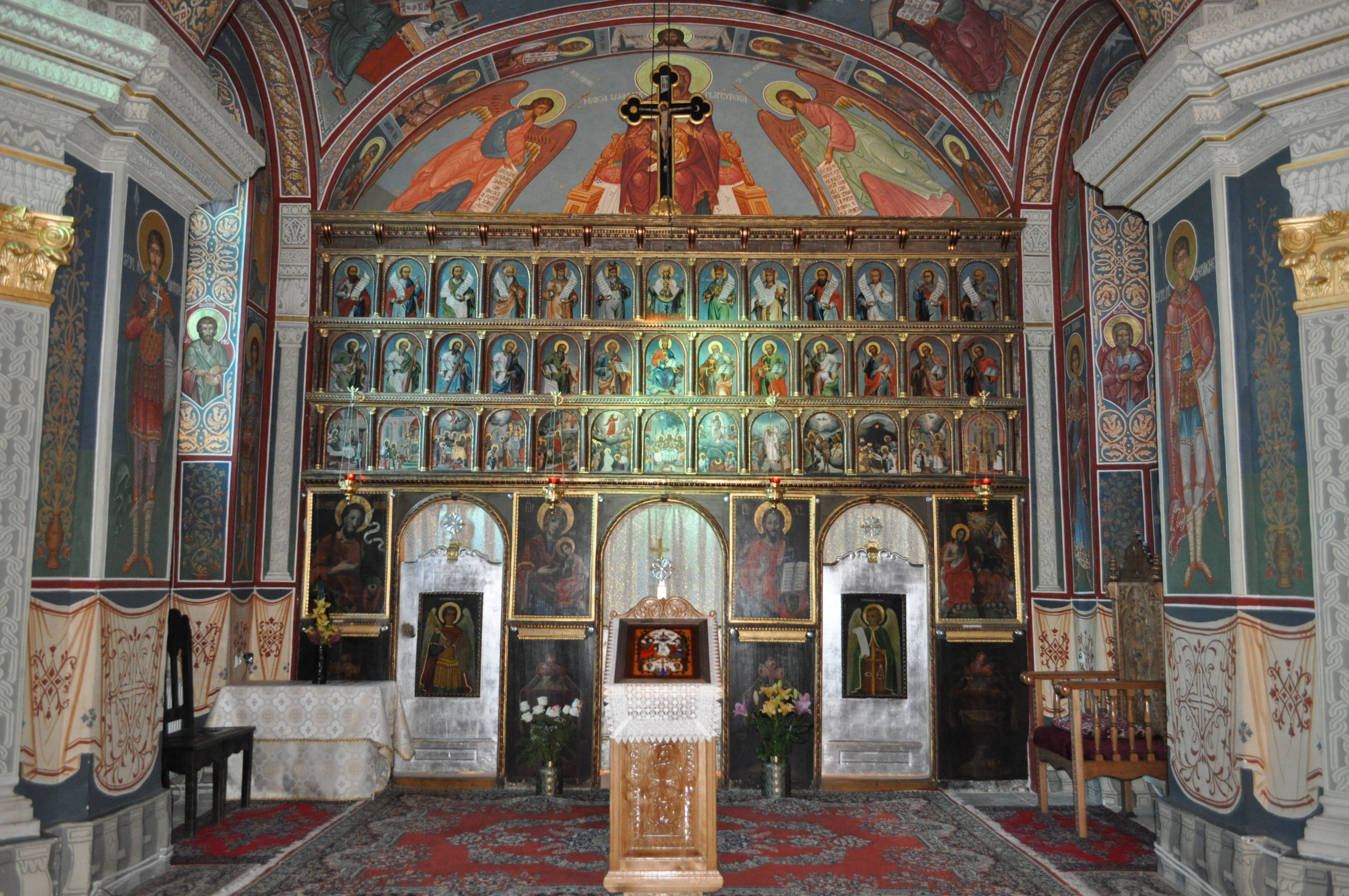
Interior

The Church on the Hill (Romanian: Biserica din Deal) is a Romanian Orthodox church located at 10 Bisericii Ortodoxe Street, Cluj-Napoca, Romania. It is dedicated to the Holy Trinity.

== Origins and description ==
In the late 18th century, several wealthy Aromanian families lived in Cluj; the nearest Orthodox church, which they attended only on major holidays, was located in Someșeni. Thus, in 1788, two merchants petitioned count Ádám Teleki, royal commissioner of Joseph II in the Principality of Transylvania, asking permission to build an Orthodox church inside the city.

The following year, the town council rejected the request, arguing that only previously established denominations could build. A new petition was issued, and a census in February 1790 identified 129 Orthodox inhabitants. Upon the government's recommendation, the chancellery in the imperial capital Vienna approved the building the same month. The town council protested in vain that this would increase the local Romanian presence. Thus, the merchants purchased land in the Hajongard area.

The church was built using a Baroque style in 1795–1796, with help from the Romanians of Brașov and Wallachia. The first liturgy was celebrated at Christmas 1796, when the church was consecrated. The church is small, 19 meters long by 9 meters wide, with a spire reaching 19 meters. The vestibule is rectangular, the nave octagonal, the choir narrow; the altar is semicircular in the interior and polygonal in the exterior. The iconostasis was painted in 1796 by the well known Constantin the Painter, a deacon from Șcheii Brașovului and sent as a gift by the merchants of Brașov.

== Subsequent history ==
From 1796 to 1932, it was the only Orthodox church in Cluj. Vasile Moga was enthroned bishop there in 1811, but political pressure soon forced him to leave for Rășinari. In 1921, when Nicolae Ivan became the first bishop of the Vad, Feleac and Cluj Diocese, the church became his cathedral, holding that status until 1933, when the Dormition Cathedral opened.

The archpriest's office has operated out of the church since 1818. Several priests are buried in the little cemetery in front of the church. Several intellectuals of the interwar period were parishioners, including Victor Papilian, Lucian Blaga and Dumitru D. Roșca. The church underwent restoration in 1919, when a memorial written by the then-priest in 1877 was discovered in the spire. As the building was facing degradation, a thorough set of repairs was carried out between 2003 and 2010.

The church is listed as a historic monument by Romania's Ministry of Culture and Religious Affairs.
