= Teofil Herineanu =

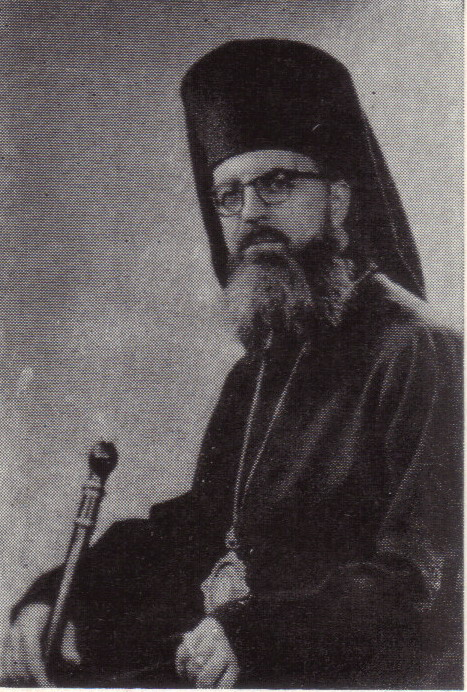
Herineanu as Bishop of Cluj in the 1960s

Teofil Herineanu (November 11, 1909–November 3, 1992) was an Austro-Hungarian-born Romanian cleric.

== Biography ==
=== Origins and Greek-Catholic priesthood ===
Born into a family of Greek-Catholic peasants in Arcalia village, Beszterce-Naszód County, Austria-Hungary, he attended primary school in Lemniu. From 1920 to 1921, after the union of Transylvania with Romania, he studied at Andrei Mureșanu High School in Dej, and from 1921 to 1928 at George Barițiu High School in Cluj. From 1928 to 1931, Herineanu attended the Greek-Catholic Theological Academy in Cluj. After graduating, he went to the Catholic Theology Faculty at the University of Paris (1931-1932), leaving due to lack of funds.

Subsequently, Herineanu served as a lay priest for seventeen years, in the poor, isolated village parishes of Ceaba, Băbuțiu and Panticeu, part of the Cluj-Gherla Diocese. He published articles, sermons and meditations. His first contacts with Romanian Orthodox priests date to this time, when he supported the Army of the Lord movement.

=== Turn to Orthodoxy ===
In late 1948, the new communist regime outlawed the Greek-Catholic Church. One day shortly thereafter, two limousines stopped in front of Herineanu's house. One belonged to the Orthodox bishop, the other to the Securitate secret police. The local police chief ironically told him: “Well, Father, you have to choose in which car you’ll return to Cluj”. He converted to Orthodoxy, agreeing to collaborate with the regime. As a result, he was elected Bishop of Roman and Huși during a June 1949 clerical assembly attended by prominent Communist politicians. Herineanu drew 58 votes, while the remaining thirteen ballots went to other candidates or were invalid. During his acceptance speech, the new bishop thanked the Orthodox hierarchy and struck a pro-communist note: “A political regime that takes care of its people and helps their material progress is worth collaborating with and not opposing.” In part, the political leadership wished to show former Greek-Catholics that they would have equal rights within the Orthodox Church; it also mistakenly calculated that Herineanu would be a pliant hierarch who would sabotage the institution from within.

In August, he was consecrated bishop in a discreet ceremony closely watched by Securitate informants. The atmosphere was one of doubt that the recent convert would ever make a genuine Orthodox bishop. Patriarch Justinian Marina reinforced Herineanu's position by attending his enthronement a week later and congratulating him in the name of the Holy Synod. Privately, Justinian was irate at the zeal with which the authorities insisted that the ex-Catholic must be made a bishop. Herineanu was in fact a compromise candidate; the communists initially preferred Valerian Zaharia for the post.

=== As bishop ===
==== Roman ====
Herineanu remained at Roman for eight and a half years. During this time, which he called his “apprenticeship in Orthodoxy”, Herineanu was viewed with suspicion by the authorities and kept under close surveillance. He viewed their recommendations as unacceptable infringements on church autonomy and kept as close advisers only his mother and several trusted priests. His missionary activity, which included the printing of prayer books in large numbers, caused somewhat of a liturgical and spiritual revival, again provoking official hostility. While the laity became attached to him, the state believed he had been contaminated by a “sickly mysticism”.

Herineanu asked that persecution of the nuns at Vladimirești Monastery be halted, and placed over forty priests freed from prison in good positions, meanwhile granting assistance to the families of imprisoned priests. His attitude led the government to attempt to compromise him, including by concocting charges of fiscal evasion.

==== Cluj ====
When Nicolae Colan became Metropolitan of Transylvania, the see of Vad, Feleac and Cluj became vacant. Herineanu was elected and enthroned in December 1957. He arrived at Cluj surrounded by suspicion, finding tension between factions of “old” Orthodox priests and former Greek-Catholics, and roused dissent by imposing the stricter liturgical discipline he had learned at Roman. At the same time, the Securitate noted he did not maintain relations with representatives of the Religious Affairs Department.

Another accusation was that he hired unconverted Greek-Catholic priests in the diocesan administration, periodically sending them special bread and wine so they could secretly hold liturgies at home. He sheltered clerics freed from prison, including Arsenie Papacioc and Nicolae Steinhardt. Herineanu believed in the need to catechize children. As such, he asked two priests to compose a religion textbook in 1958. The authors were arrested, one of them dying in prison, and the bishop was further isolated.

Pressure continued in the 1960s, with the authorities especially concerned by the rising popularity of the annual pilgrimage to Nicula Monastery. He was raised to the rank of archbishop in 1973. Herineanu lived nearly three years after the Romanian Revolution, using his declining powers to try and mediate conflicts within the archdiocese and with the newly legalized Greek-Catholic Church, as well as to press for the reopening of a university-level theological seminary in Cluj-Napoca. Upon his death in 1992, he was buried in the crypt of the Dormition Cathedral.
