= Metropolis of Cluj, Maramureș and Sălaj =

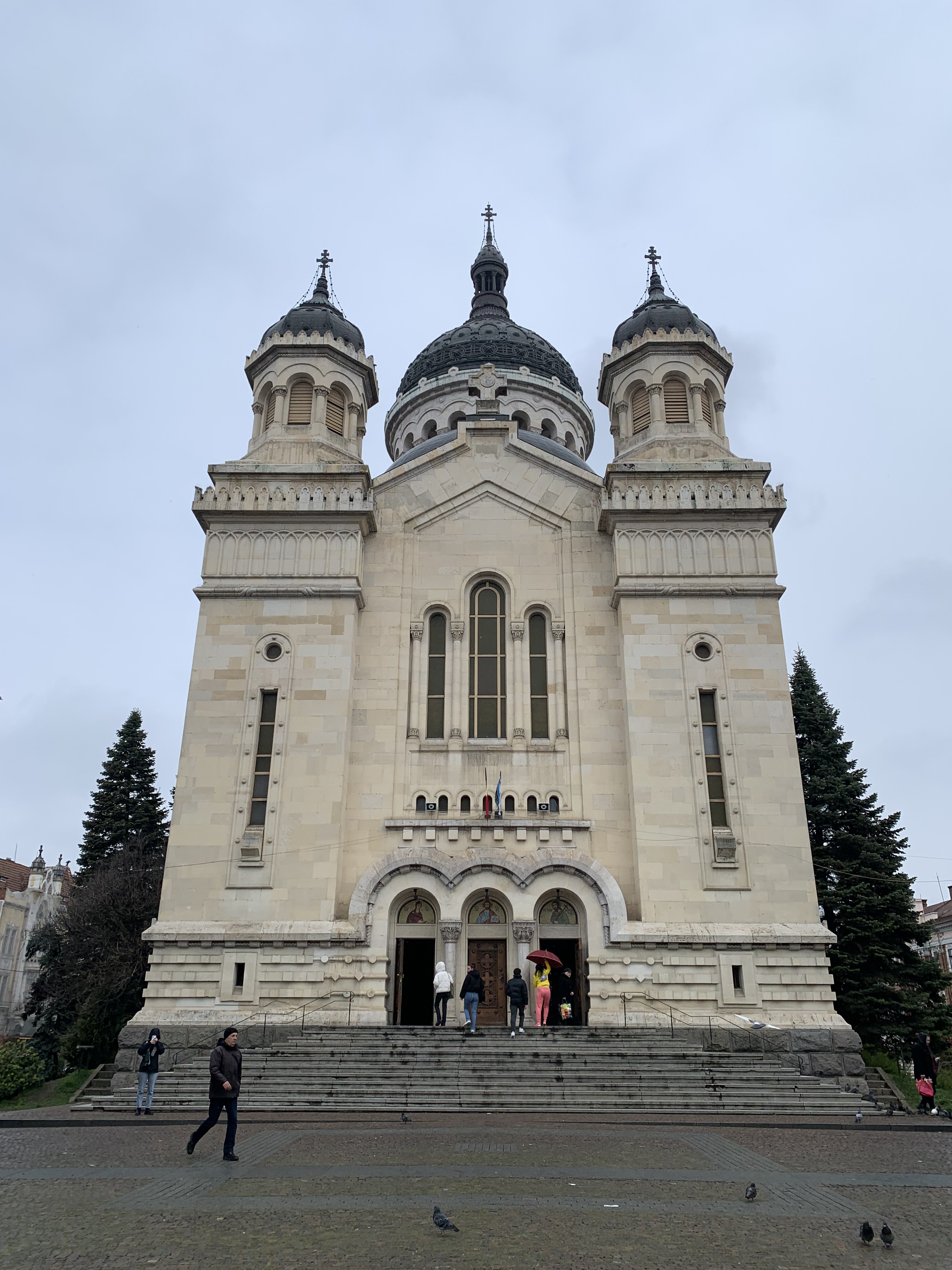
- Dormition of the Theotokos Cathedral

Location
- Headquarters: Cluj-Napoca

Information
- Denomination: Eastern Orthodox
- Sui iuris church: Romanian Orthodox Church
- Cathedral: Dormition of the Theotokos Cathedral, Cluj-Napoca
- Governance: Metropolis

Website
- Official website

The Metropolis of Cluj, Maramureș and Sălaj (Romanian: Mitropolia Clujului, Maramureșului și Sălajului) is a metropolis of the Romanian Orthodox Church. Its see is the Archdiocese of Vad, Feleac and Cluj; its suffragan dioceses are Maramureș and Sătmar and Sălaj. The headquarters is the Dormition Cathedral in Cluj-Napoca. It covers northern Transylvania and southern Maramureș. It was established in March 2006 when its territory was removed from the jurisdiction of the Metropolis of Transylvania.

== Metropolitan bishops ==
- Bartolomeu Anania (March 2006 – January 2011)
- Andrei Andreicuț (March 2011-)
