= Church on the Hill =

Church on the Hill may refer to:

- Church on the Hill (Cluj-Napoca)
- Church on the Hill (Lenox, Massachusetts)
- Church on the Hill (Sighișoara)
