= Andrei Oțetea =

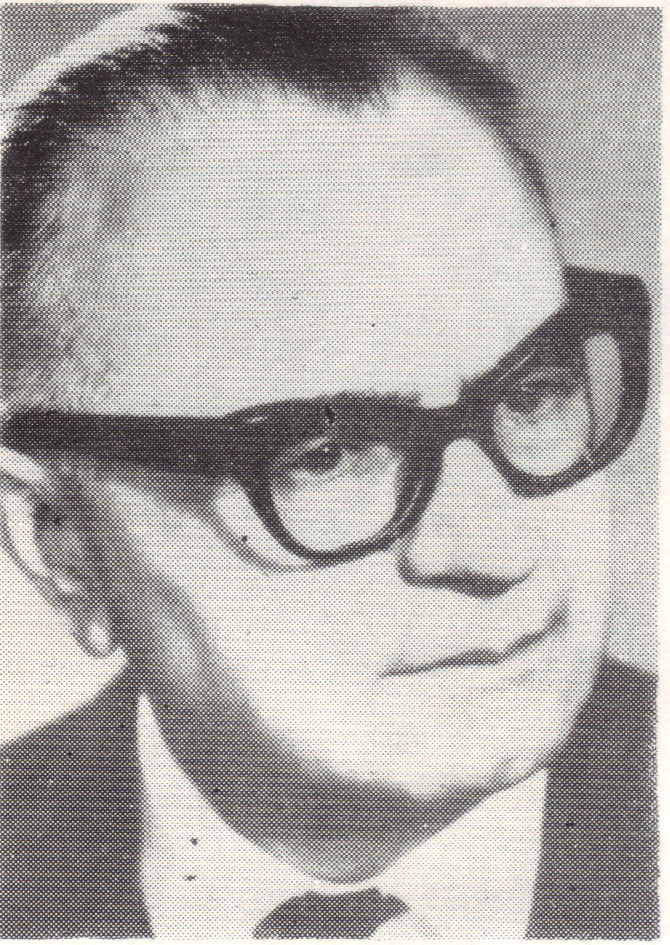
Andrei Oțetea

Andrei Oțetea (July 24, [O.S. August 5] 1894–March 21, 1977) was an Austro-Hungarian-born Romanian historian.

Born in Sibiel, a village in the Mărginimea Sibiului region, Oțetea attended the local Romanian Orthodox school before entering the Hungarian State High School in Sibiu. His pro-Romanian stance caused problems with a history teacher, leading him to transfer to Andrei Șaguna High School in Brașov. His classmates included Lucian Blaga, Nicolae Colan and Dumitru D. Roșca.

In autumn 1919, after the union of Transylvania with Romania, Oțetea and Roșca were among a group of young men sent by ASTRA to study in France. Within days, they met a group from Western Moldavia, including Mihai Ralea, becoming lifelong friends. Oțetea studied Italian and French at the Sorbonne, also attending Sciences Po. His professors included André Siegfried, Henri Hauvette, Henri Hauser and Charles Diehl. He wrote two doctorates on Francesco Guicciardini, in 1926 (in French) and 1927 (in Italian).

After returning to Romania in 1927, Oțetea was named to the department of modern and contemporary world history at the University of Iași, eventually rising to full professor. From 1935 to 1947 he was in the university administration. Between 1939 and 1947, he intermittently headed the Iași National Theatre. In 1947, shortly before the onset of the communist regime, he became professor of world history and assistant rector at the University of Bucharest. His students included Florin Constantiniu, Șerban Papacostea and Dan Berindei.

In 1947–1948, and again from 1956 to 1970, Oțetea headed the Nicolae Iorga History Institute, where he was responsible for the publication of specialized works. He was elected a titular member of the Romanian Academy in 1955. Oțetea died in Paris in March 1977; he was buried in Sibiel a week later.
