= Veck =

Veck may refer to:

- Vecuronium bromide
- Recea-Cristur, a commune in Romania
- Toby "Trotty" Veck and Margaret "Meg" Veck, characters in Dickens' novel The Chimes
