= Olteanca =

Olteanca may refer to several villages in Romania:

- Olteanca, a village in Pădina Mare Commune, Mehedinți County
- Olteanca, a village in Segarcea-Vale Commune, Teleorman County
- Olteanca, a village in Glăvile Commune, Vâlcea County
- Olteanca, a village in Lădești Commune, Vâlcea County
