= Săliște =

- Town
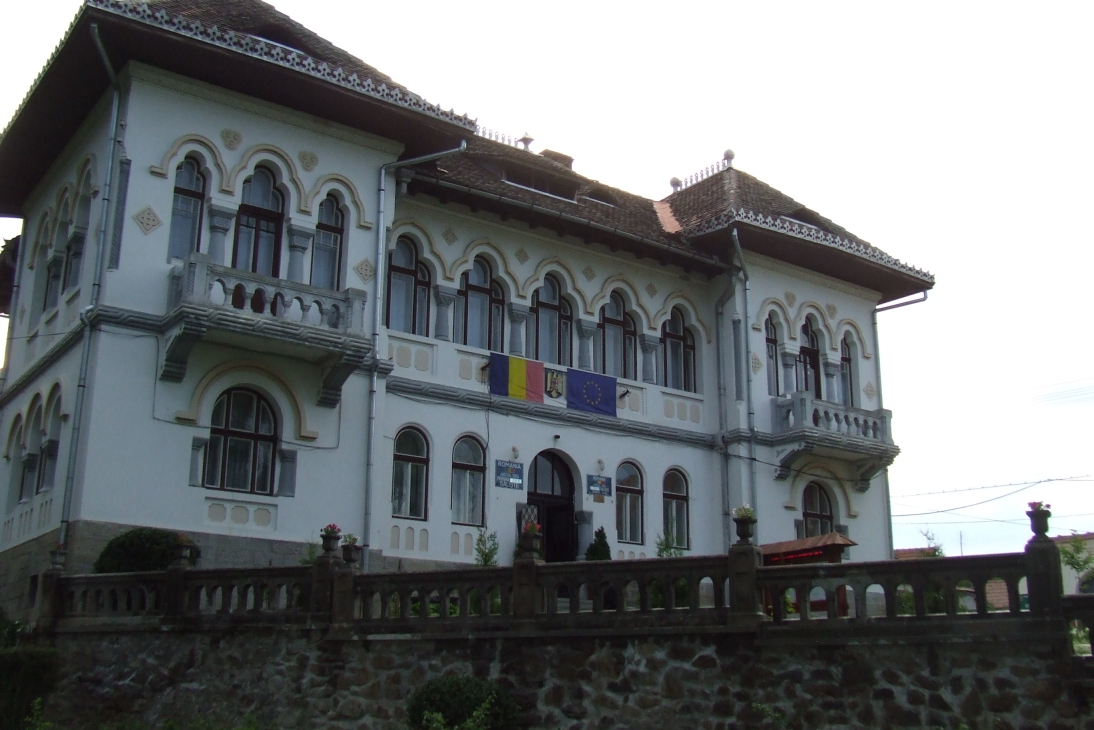
- The City Hall

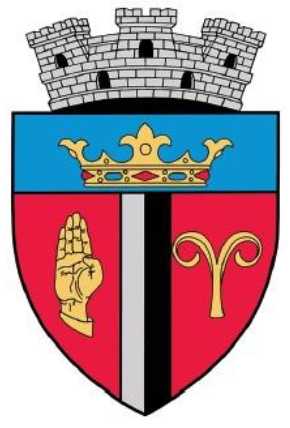
- Coat of arms

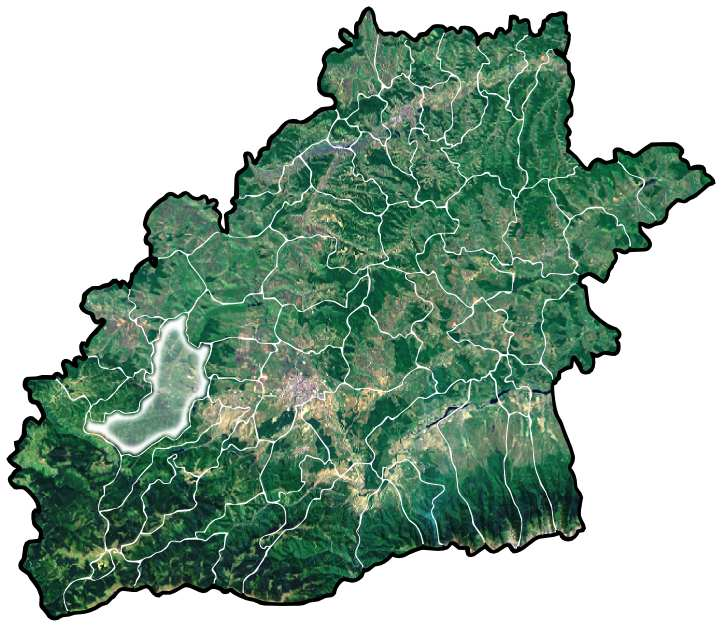
- Location in Sibiu County

- Location in Romania
- Coordinates: 45°47′39″N 23°53′11″E
- Country: Romania
- County: Sibiu

Government
  - Mayor (2024–2028): Horațiu-Dumitru Răcuciu (PNL)
- Area: 226.78 km^{2} (87.56 sq mi)
- Elevation: 542 m (1,778 ft)
- Population (2021-12-01): 5,710
  - Density: 25.2/km^{2} (65.2/sq mi)
- Time zone: UTC+02:00 (EET)
  - Summer (DST): UTC+03:00 (EEST)
- Postal code: 557225
- Area code: (+40) 02 69
- Vehicle reg.: SB
- Website: www.saliste-sibiu.ro

Săliște (German: Großendorf or Selischte; Hungarian: Szelistye) is a town in Sibiu County, in the centre of Romania, 21 km (13 mi) west of the county capital, Sibiu. Declared a town in 2003, it is the main locality in the Mărginimea Sibiului area.

== Geography ==
The town is situated at the edge of the Cindrel Mountains, on a series of river valleys which flow into the Cibin River, in the southwestern part of the Transylvanian Plateau. The main town of Săliște has a population of 2,830; it also administers nine villages:

- Aciliu (Hungarian: Ecsellő; German: Tetschein) – 268 inhabitants, 8 km away.
- Amnaș (Hungarian: Omlás; German: Hamlesch) – 369 inhabitants, 9 km away; Saxon fortified church.
- Crinț (Hungarian: Krinc) – 2 permanent inhabitants, 18 km away; military base.
- Fântânele (until 1964 Cacova Sibiului; Hungarian: Szebenkákova; German: Krebsbach bei Hermannstadt) – 251 inhabitants, 6 km away.
- Galeș (Hungarian: Szebengálos; German: Gallusdorf) - 331 inhabitants, 2 km away.
- Mag (Hungarian: Mág) – 439 inhabitants, 9 km away.
- Săcel (Hungarian: Szecsel; German: Schwarzwasser) – 520 inhabitants, 4 km away.
- Sibiel (Hungarian: Szibiel; German: Budenbach) – 402 inhabitants, 6 km away.
- Vale (Hungarian: Vále; German: Grabendorf) – 384 inhabitants, 2 km away.

== Demographics ==
Historical population
| Year | Pop. | ±% |
|---|---|---|
| 2002 | 6,092 | — |
| 2011 | 5,040 | −17.3% |
| 2021 | 5,710 | +13.3% |
Source: Census data

Originally all the localities, except the village of Amnaș, were inhabited by Romanians. As of 2011, 95.7% of inhabitants were Romanians, 3.3% Roma, and 0.6% Germans.

Most Romanians are Orthodox and the Germans still living in Amnaș are Lutheran Evangelical. There are also some small Protestant Churches.

== Economy ==
Traditionally the main occupation was shepherding and related activities. Today this occupies a smaller percentage of the workforce, but remains important alongside other agricultural activities. Light industry was developed in the recent period and there are some textile workshops. Commerce and services are also an important activity. The area around Aciliu and Amnaș is well suited for wines and around Mag and Săcel there are a series of artificial lakes for fish farming.

The film Blestemul pământului, blestemul iubirii was shot in the village of Fântânele in 1978–1979.

== History ==
The area was inhabited for a very long time, and on a hill between Sălişte and the nearby commune of Tilișca there are the ruins of an old Dacian citadel. The first document mentioning the town is from 1354 and refers, in Latin, to Magna Villa. Early names would be Nogfalu in Hungarian and Grossdorf in German. Later, in 1383 the village is known as Magna Villa Valachiealis (Big Village of the Vlachs), denoting its ethnically Romanian population. Still later, it was one of the villages in the Țara Amlașului (Omlás), a Transylvanian fiefdom granted by the kings of Hungary during the 14th and 15th centuries to the Wallachian rulers.

Around 1485 it was included in one of the seven seats of Saxondom.

In the late 18th century Săliște became an important village of the Romanian community and the most important cultural centre in the Mărginimea Sibiului area. In 1774 an important local revolt of the Romanian population took place; members of this community also participated in the revolution of 1848, the Transylvanian Memorandum movement, and almost every important event in the National awakening of the Romanians in Transylvania.

== Personalities ==
Some of the most notable personalities born in Săliște are:

- Axente Banciu (1875–1959), Romanian academic
- Ioan din Galeș, Confessor priest, celebrated on the Feast Day of October 21
- Onisifor Ghibu (1883–1972), teacher, organiser of the Romanian educational system in Transylvania
- Alexandru Hanzu (1871–1949), Romanian general in World War I and the Hungarian–Romanian War
- Marina Hociotă (1896–1977), Romanian nun and nurse during World War I
- Nicolae Ivan (1855–1936), Bishop of Cluj, Feleac and Vad
- Michael Klein (1959–1993), Romanian footballer
- Ioan Lupaș (1880–1967), Romanian historian
- Andrei Oțetea (1894–1977), Romanian historian
- Dionisie Romano (1806–1873), Bishop of Buzău, theologian and writer
- Dumitru D. Roșca (1895–1980), Romanian academician and philosopher
- Ilie Șteflea (1887–1946), Romanian general, Chief of the General Staff (1942–1944)

== Image gallery ==
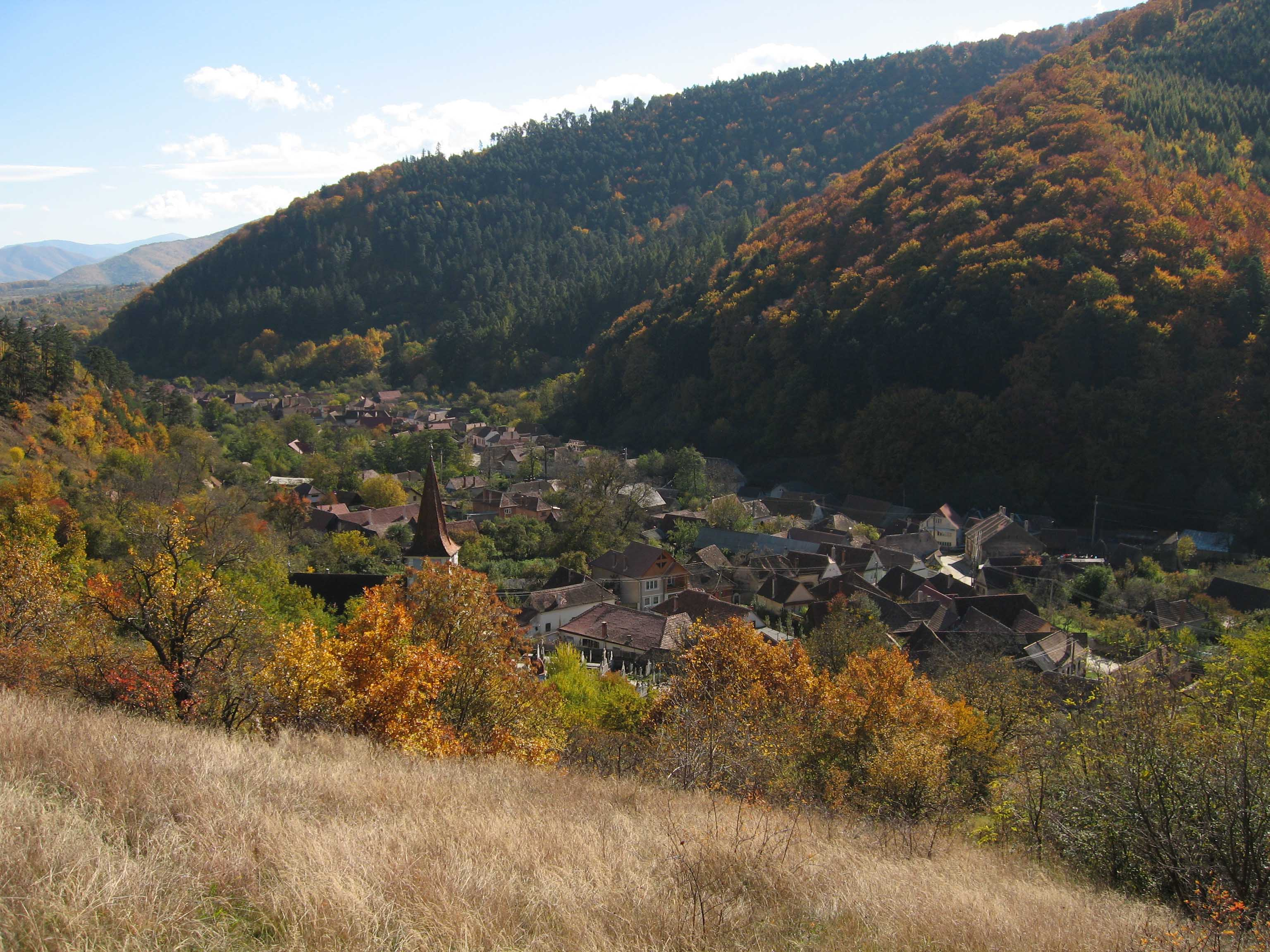
The village of Galeș nestled in the foothills of the Cindrel Mountains

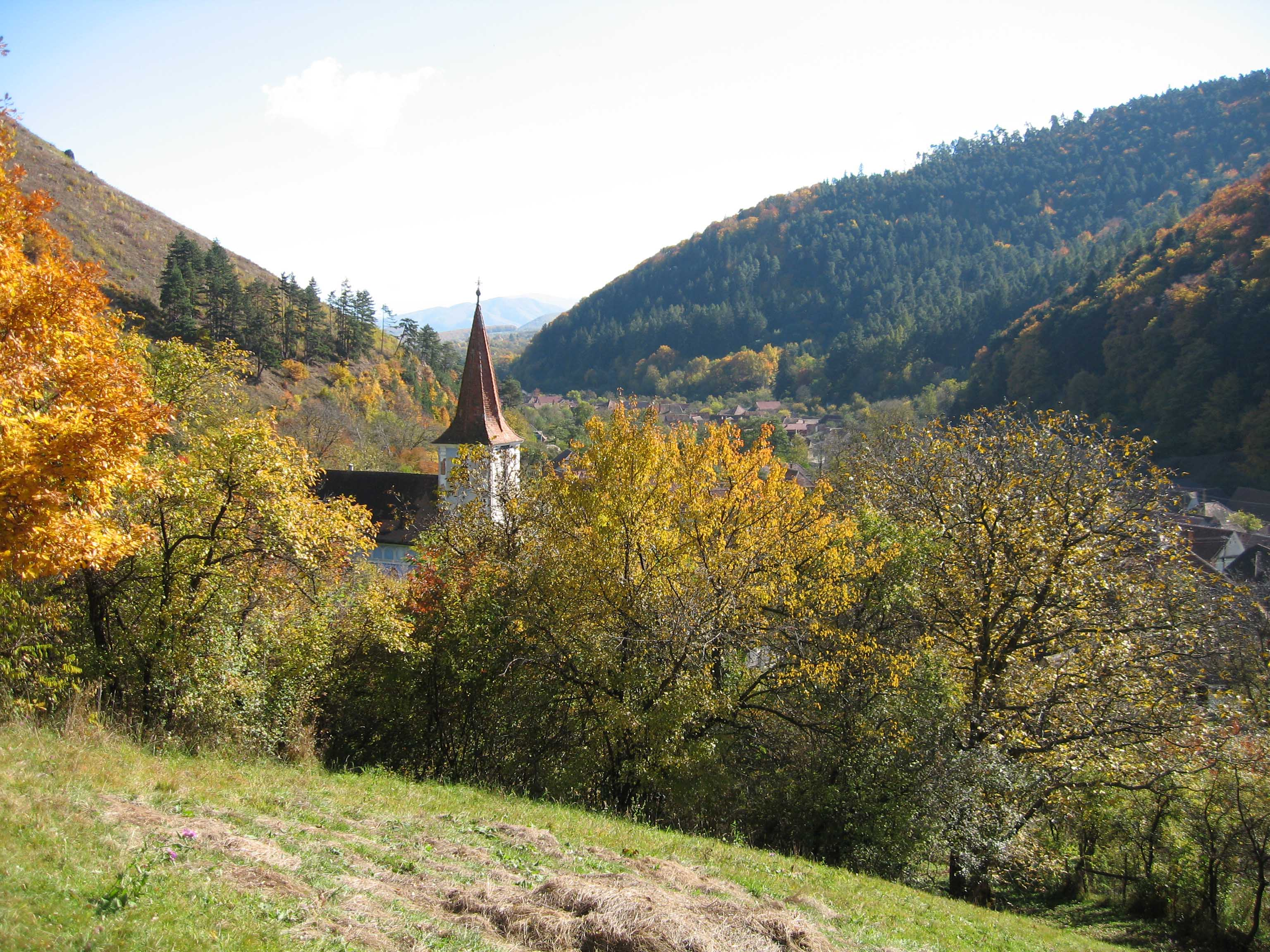
The village church of Galeș

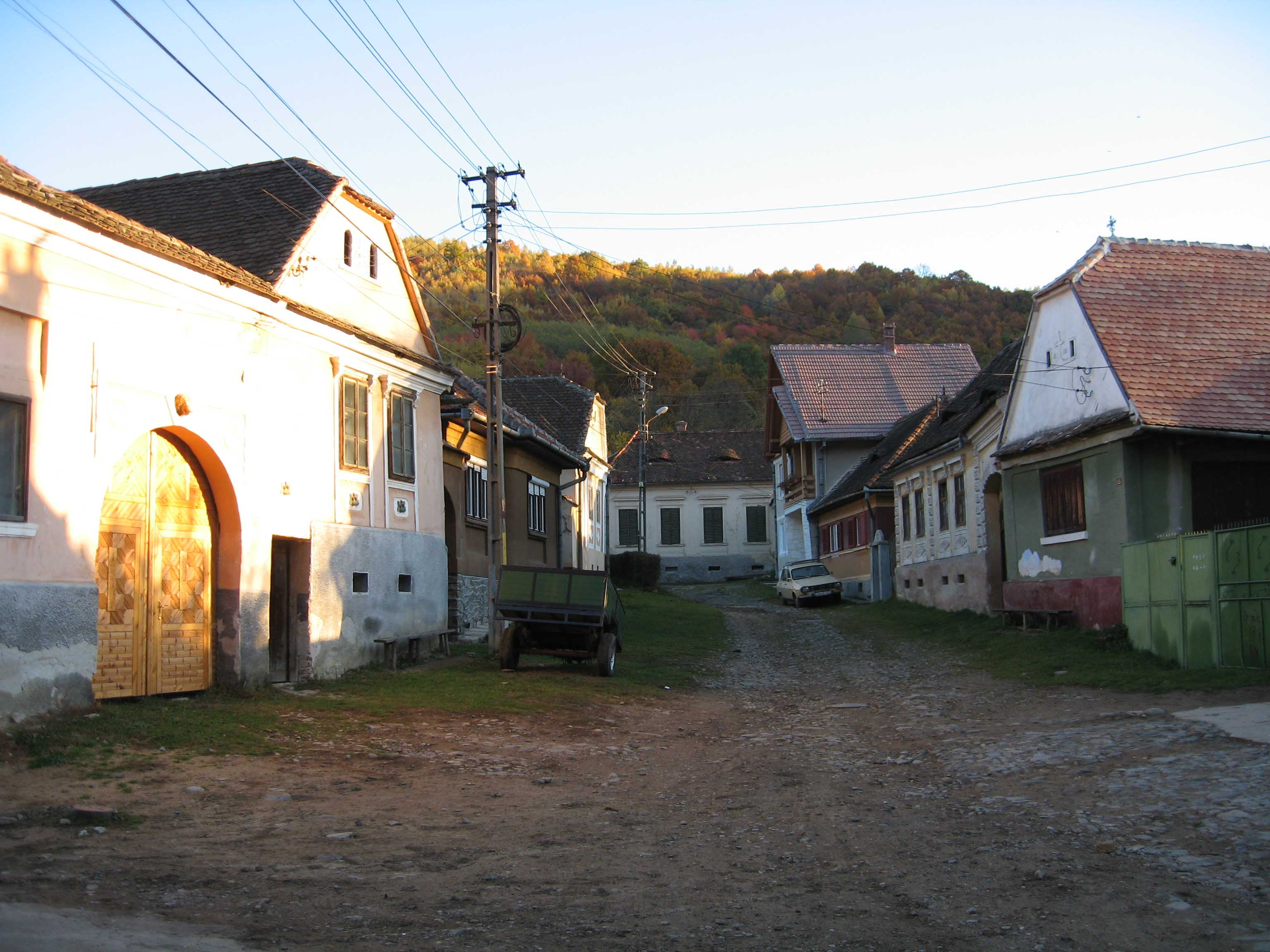
A typical village street - the approach to the church

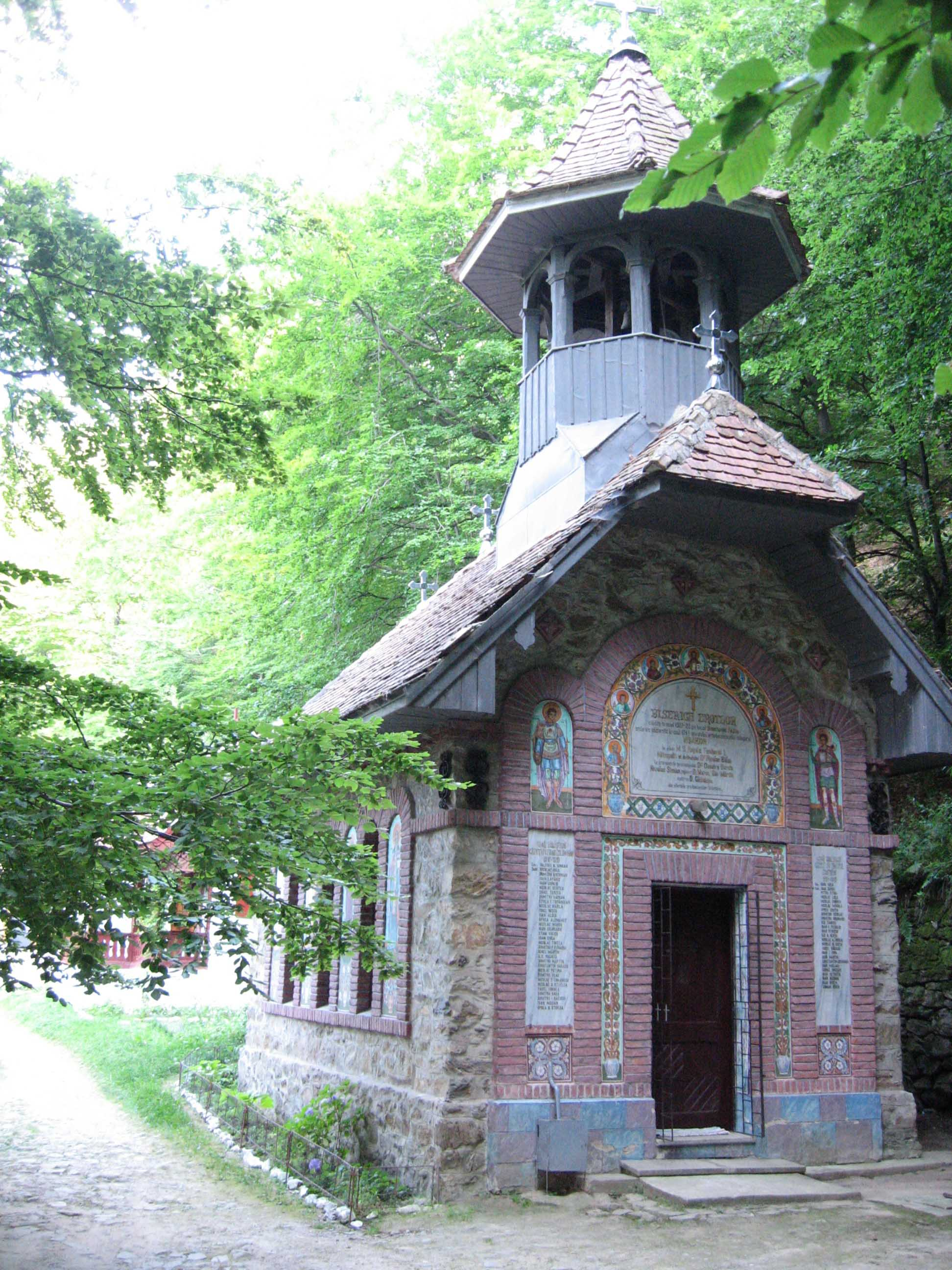
A small church and nuns' retreat

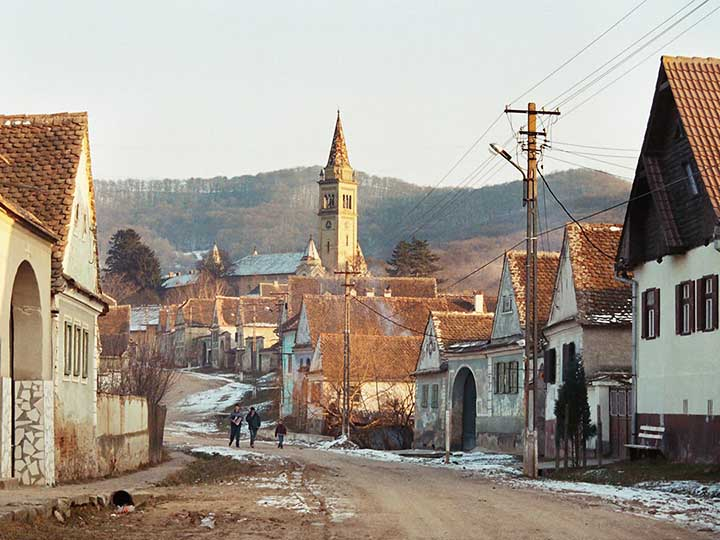
Main street of Amnaș village with the Saxon fortified church in the background

A local resident

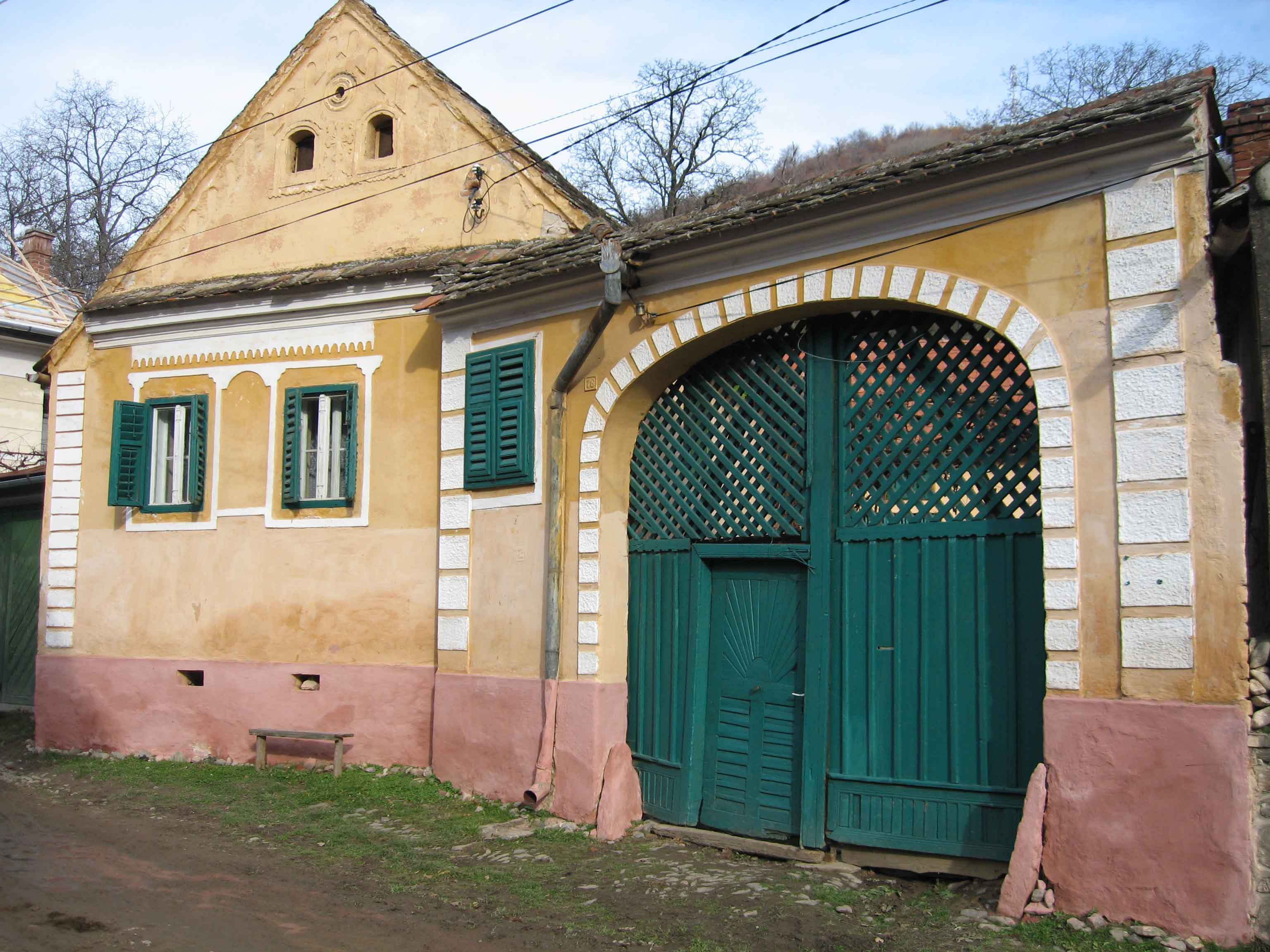
A typical village house façade

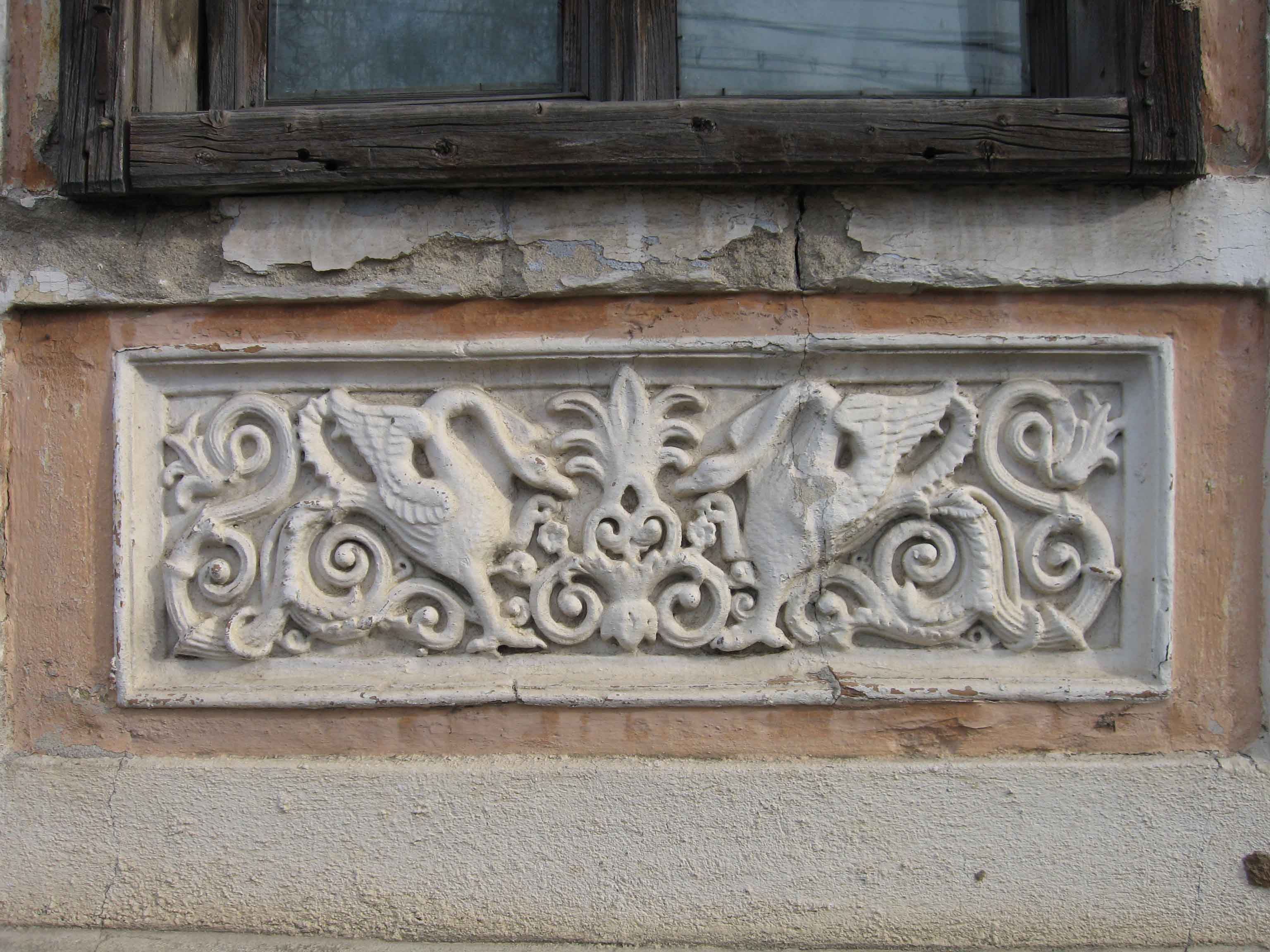
Carving on a house façade in the centre of the village
