= Bishop of Cluj =

Bishop of Cluj may refer to:

- The bishop of the Greek Catholic Diocese of Cluj-Gherla
- The bishop of the Orthodox Archbishopric of Vad, Feleac and Cluj
- The bishop of the Eparhia Reformată din Ardeal
