= Andrei Mureșanu National College (Dej) =

Coordinates: 47.1415°N 23.8785°E

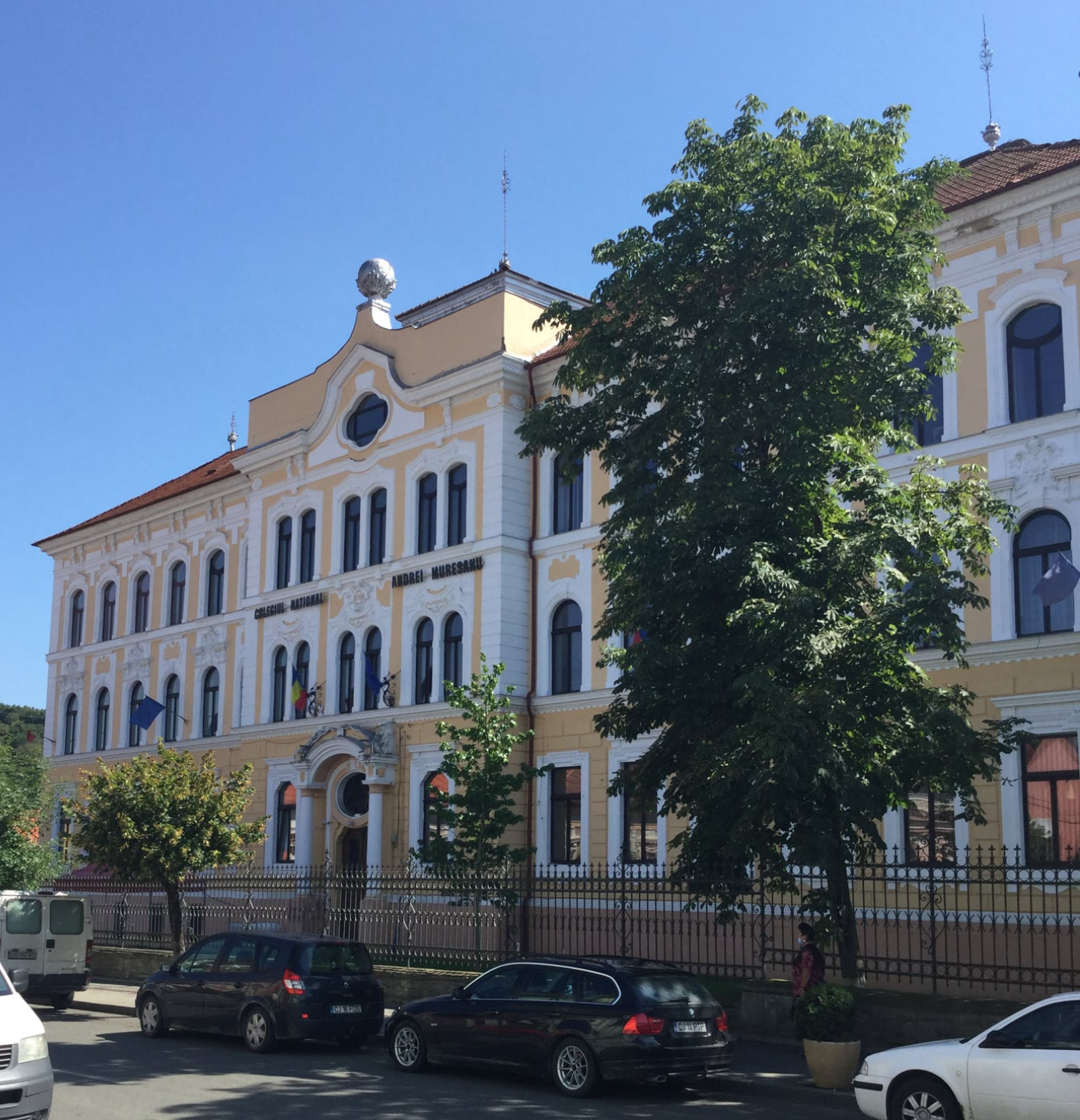
Andrei Mureșanu National College

Andrei Mureșanu National College (Romanian: Colegiul Național Andrei Mureșanu) is a high school located at 1 Mai Street, nr. 10, Dej, Romania.

By the early 1890s, when the area was part of Austria-Hungary, the local inhabitants were demanding a high school for Dej, which only had a gymnasium with lower grades. Their petition to the Education Ministry at Budapest, sent in 1892, was met with a vague reply, and was not actively approved until 1897, when a grade of high school opened in the former gymnasium building, which had belonged to George II Rákóczi. The new building was begun in spring 1899 and completed the following autumn. The school had the full eight grades by 1904–1905, with the first graduates finishing at the end of the year. By 1918, nearly 500 pupils had graduated; 84 were ethnic Romanians, often noted for their academic performance.

Following the union of Transylvania with Romania, the school was taken over by the Romanian state. The revamped institution opened in October 1919 with 282 regular and 43 private pupils taught by eleven faculty; several months later, they were joined by a French teacher from the French military mission. There were almost no textbooks, and while the natural sciences collection was highly developed, materials for chemistry, geography and history were lacking. The library was well-stocked, but none of the books were in Romanian; various donors, including the Romanian Academy and Nicolae Iorga, sent books. From the beginning, thanks to prefect Teodor Mihali, students from rural areas were provided with a dormitory; in 1930, they moved into a former palace. The interwar period produced a further 590 graduates.

From 1940 to 1944, due to the Second Vienna Award, the school once again became a Hungarian institution. Starting in 1948, new communist regime renamed the school and ordered the admission of girls. In 1969, its traditional name, after poet and revolutionary Andrei Mureșanu, was revived. The following year, his statue was unveiled on the school grounds. From 1977 until the Romanian Revolution, the institution was an industrial high school. It was declared a national college in 1997. The school offers extra hours of English in grades 5–8, while one class in each of grades 9-12 is taught in Hungarian.

== Alumni ==
- Teofil Herineanu
- Cornel Itu
