= Diocese of Sălaj =

The Diocese of Sălaj (Romanian: Episcopia Sălajului) is a diocese of the Romanian Orthodox Church. Its see is the Ascension Cathedral in Zalău and its ecclesiastical territory covers Sălaj County. The diocese forms part of the Metropolis of Cluj, Maramureș and Sălaj. It has three archpriests' districts, around 220 priests in 270 churches, of which 74 are historic monuments, five almshouses, five monasteries, two sketes, 40 monks and a theological seminary in Zalău. It was established in 2007, and in 2008, Petroniu Florea became the diocese's first bishop.
