= Nicolae Colan =

Romanian politician, theologian and bishop (1893–1967)

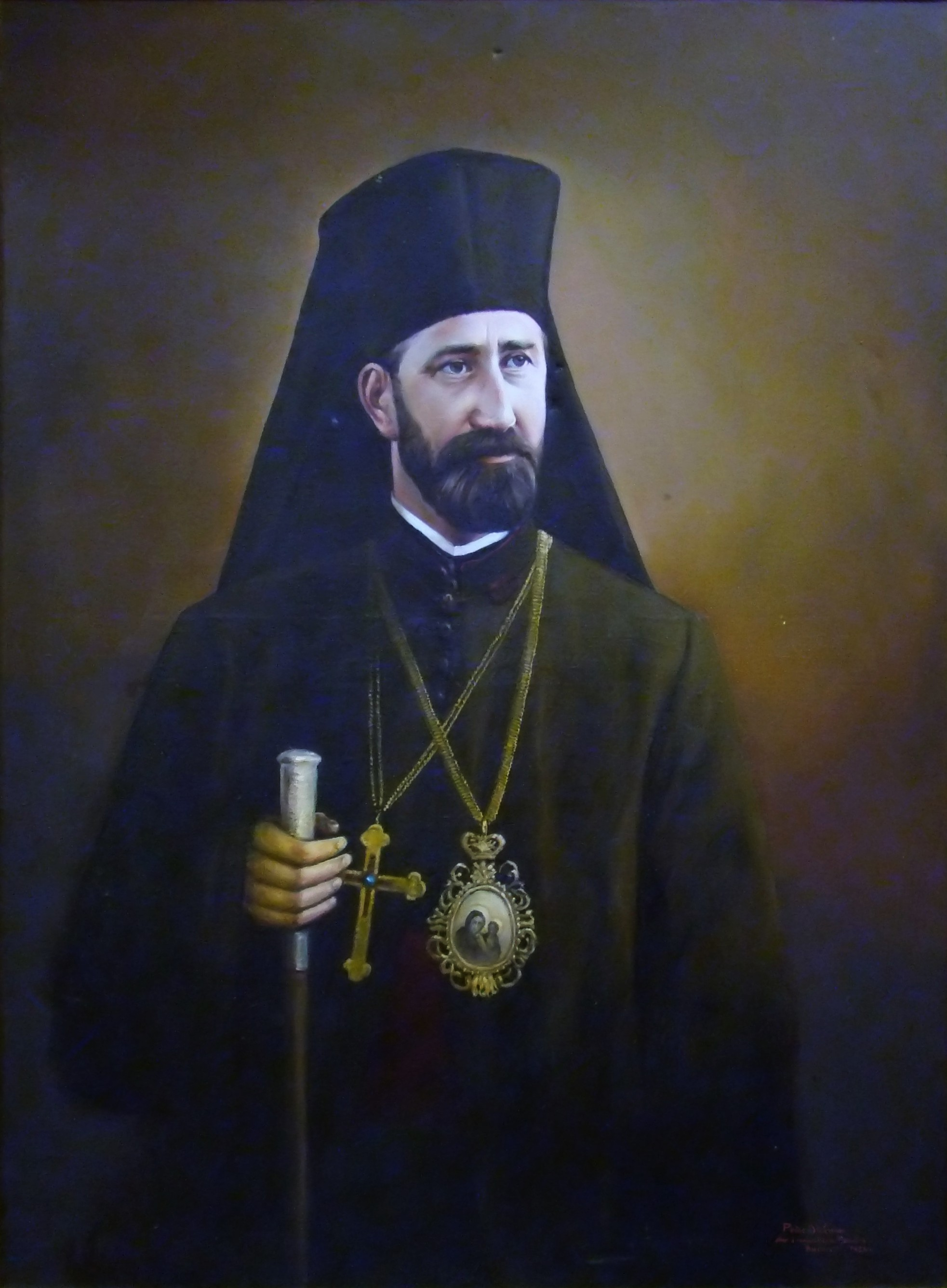
- Church: Romanian Orthodox Church
- Archdiocese: Sibiu
- Metropolis: Transylvania
- Installed: 26 May 1957
- Term ended: 15 April 1967
- Predecessor: Iustin Moisescu
- Successor: Nicolae Mladin
- Other post: Bishop of Vad, Feleac and Cluj (1936–1957)

Orders
- Ordination: 1934
- Consecration: 31 May 1936

Personal details
- Born: 28 November 1893 Árapatak, Háromszék County, Austria-Hungary (now Araci, Covasna County, Romania)
- Died: 15 April 1967 (aged 73) Sibiu, Socialist Republic of Romania
- Buried: Sâmbăta de Sus Monastery
- Denomination: Eastern Orthodox Church
- Profession: Theologian
- Education: University of Bucharest
- Signature

Minister of National Education
- In office 31 March 1938 – 20 June 1938
- Monarch: Carol II of Romania
- Prime Minister: Patriarch Miron of Romania
- Preceded by: Victor Iamandi
- Succeeded by: Armand Călinescu (acting); Petre Andrei

Nicolae Colan (Romanian pronunciation: [nikoˈla.e koˈlan]; 28 November 1893 – 15 April 1967) was an Austro-Hungarian-born Romanian cleric, a metropolitan bishop of the Romanian Orthodox Church. From a peasant background, Colan completed high school in Brașov, followed by a period of wandering during World War I that saw him in Sibiu, Bucharest, Moldavia, Ukraine and ultimately Bessarabia, where he advocated union with Romania. After the war, he completed university and taught New Testament theology at Sibiu from 1924 to 1936. Entering the clergy in 1934, he soon became bishop at Cluj, remaining there when Northern Transylvania temporarily became Hungarian territory during World War II. In 1957, he advanced to Metropolitan of Transylvania, an office he held for the final decade of his life.

== Biography ==
=== Beginnings ===
Born in Araci, Covasna County, his parents were the peasants Nicolae and Ana (née Nema). He attended primary school in his native village before enrolling at Sfântu Gheorghe's Hungarian-language Sékely Mikó College, where he completed one year (1906–1907). He finished high school at the Romanian-language Andrei Șaguna High School in Brașov, which he attended from 1907 to 1914. Subsequently, he attended the Sibiu theological institute, from 1914 to 1916. His colleagues included Lucian Blaga, Andrei Oțetea, Dumitru D. Roșca, Horea Teculescu and some fifty others. Most of them did not intend to join the priesthood, but attending the seminary did offer a temporary exemption from service in the Austro-Hungarian Army, which had recently begun operations in World War I.

His first published work came in Gazeta Transilvaniei in 1915, followed the next year by articles in Revista Teologică. Following the Romanian Old Kingdom's August 1916 entry into World War I, he and several other young Transylvanian intellectuals, among them Oțetea, crossed the border into Romania. Colan subsequently enrolled in the Literature faculty of the University of Bucharest. When the capital Bucharest was evacuated during the Battle of Bucharest, he left for Roman in Moldavia, where he tutored high schoolers. Next, he ended up in a Ukrainian village, near Yelisavetgrad, where, together with other refugee Transylvanians who included Ion Agârbiceanu, he organized a church choir that delivered responses in Romanian to the priests' Slavonic.

In October 1917, he settled in Chișinău, capital of the Bessarabia region, in autumn 1917, together with the other wandering Transylvanians. There, he edited România Nouă newspaper with Onisifor Ghibu. Later, he was named editor of Sfatul Țării newspaper, the official organ of Sfatul Țării, which governed the Moldavian Democratic Republic. Although he did not participate in the events leading up to the union of Transylvania with Romania, he did take satisfaction from the fact that his patriotic writings advocated and helped shift public opinion toward the union of Bessarabia with Romania.

=== Interwar period ===
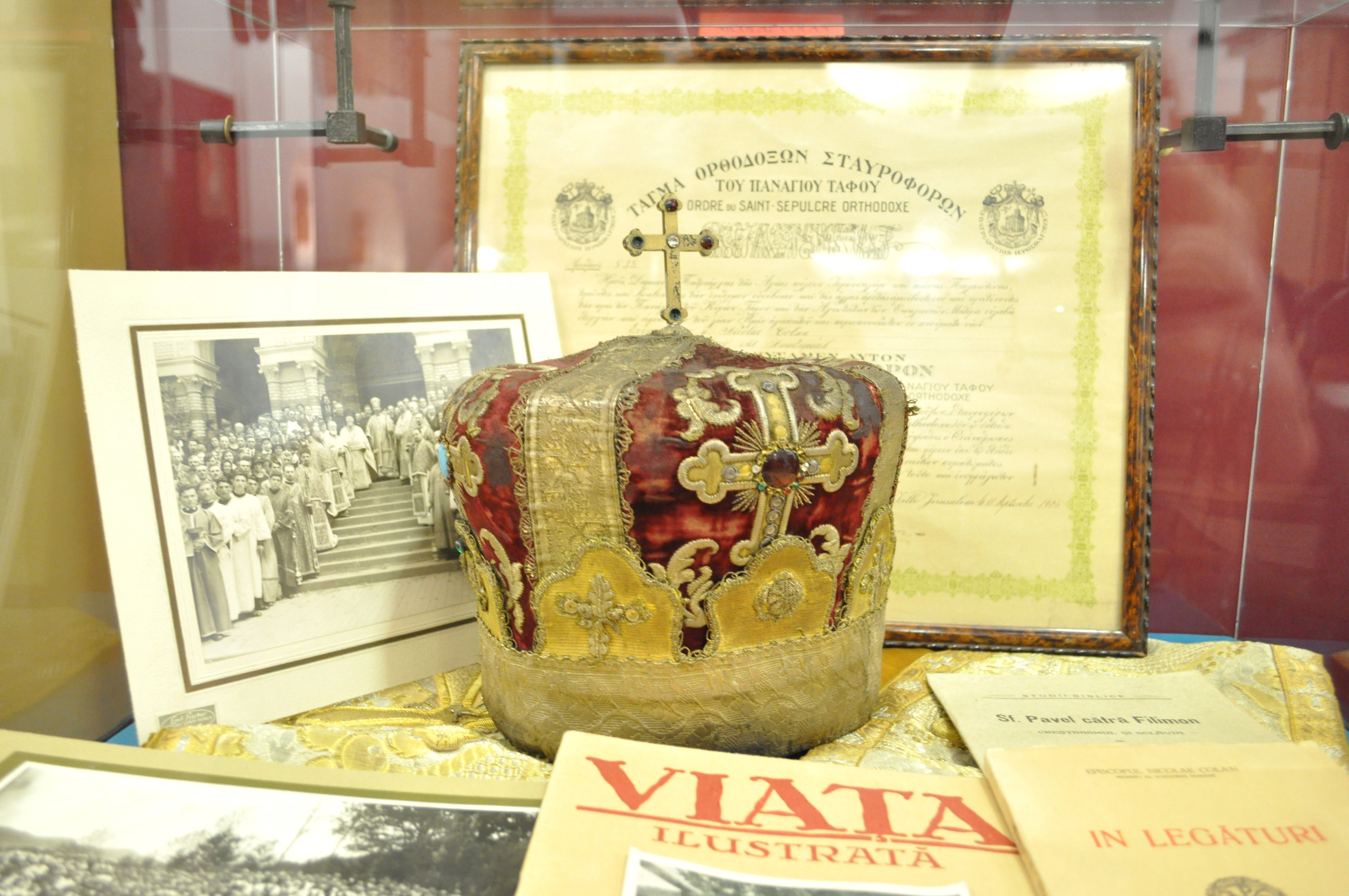
Colan's mitre

At the war's conclusion and following the creation of Greater Romania, he returned to Bucharest, where he earned his degree in 1921. Encouraged by Nicolae Bălan, Metropolitan of Transylvania, he attended postgraduate courses in Protestant theology at the University of Berlin from 1921 to 1922. Upon his return to Romania, he was named archdiocesan secretary at Sibiu. In 1924, he was appointed professor of New Testament studies at the local theological seminary. He taught there until 1936, and was named rector in 1928.

A member of the Sibiu Archdiocese's council and of ASTRA's central committee, he edited Revista Teologică from 1923 to 1936. He helped Bălan establish several series of religious books that appeared at Sibiu. Colan founded and then edited Viaţa Ilustrată, which ran from 1934 to 1944. He published a number of books about the New Testament.

Ordained a deacon and then a priest in October 1934, he became an archpriest the following spring. In April 1936, he was elected Bishop of Vad, Feleac and Cluj. The following month, he was consecrated bishop at the Sibiu Orthodox Cathedral, with Bălan leading the service. At Cluj, he continued to write in Viaţa Ilustrată, as well as in the diocesan newsletter Renaşterea. In 1937, he established a school for church singers at Nușeni. During 1938–1939, he served as Education Minister and as Religious Affairs Minister under Miron Cristea.

=== World War II and later life ===
In late summer 1940, the Second Vienna Award forced Romania to cede Northern Transylvania to Hungary. At a meeting in Cluj between Colan, Bălan and the leading figure of the Romanian Greek-Catholic Church, Iuliu Hossu, it was decided that Colan and Hossu would stay behind. Thus, Colan was the only Orthodox bishop to remain in the occupied region. He led not only his archdiocese but guided the Orthodox from the Maramureş, Oradea and Sibiu dioceses who fell under Hungarian rule. Colan and Hossu were close collaborators under Hungarian rule, which aided the local Romanians. On numerous occasions, the temporary authorities barred him from making pastoral visits and blocked the publication of certain church periodicals. Colan suffered due to the expulsion, imprisonment and killing of clerics and laymen in his diocese, as well as their forced conversion from Orthodoxy. Colan openly condemned the Hungarian antisemitic legislation and encouraged his followers to shelter and protect the Jews.

In addition to publishing several prayer books in the early 1940s, he later assembled the speeches and sermons he delivered during this period into a volume. From 1940 to 1945, he coordinated the activity of the Cluj theological academy, as well as teaching New Testament courses. Also at Cluj, he founded an Orthodox high school that opened for the 1944–1945 academic year and subsequently split into separate boys' and girls' schools; as well as a choir school that evolved into a theological seminary.

Elected an honorary member of the Romanian Academy in 1938, he advanced to titular member in 1942, but was stripped of the honor in June 1948 by the new Communist regime. Also in 1948, he formed part of his church's delegation to a Pan-Orthodox Conference held in Moscow.

According to Greek-Catholic Bishop Florentin Crihălmeanu, in 1948, when the communist government banned the Greek-Catholic Church and transferred its properties to the Orthodox Church, Bishop Colan and the appointed priest refused, as a sign of protest, to enter the Transfiguration Cathedral in Cluj, which had just been confiscated from the Greek-Catholics and transferred to the Romanian Orthodox Church. The appointed priest was persecuted by the Communist authorities, and Colan himself was harassed, which ultimately forced him to enter the church.

Elected and enthroned as Archbishop of Sibiu and Metropolitan of Transylvania in May 1957, he guided the activities of the clergy, the theological institute and the church's publications. He was also involved in the repainting of the cathedral. He died in Sibiu in 1967. Initially buried at Rășinari, his remains were later moved to Sâmbăta de Sus Monastery. His distinctions included the Order of the Crown of Romania (grand officer, 1936; grand cross, 1938), Order of the Star of the Romanian People's Republic (second class, 1957) and the Order of Polonia Restituta (grand cross, 1938).
