= Cornel Itu =

Romanian politician

Member of the Chamber of Deputies
- Incumbent
- Assumed office 15 December 2008

Personal details
- Born: October 17, 1955 (age 70) Ciubanca, Cluj Region, Romanian People's Republic
- Party: PSD (1994–present)
- Education: Cluj-Napoca Polytechnic Institute
- Profession: engineer

Cornel Itu (born October 17, 1955) is a Romanian politician. A member of the Social Democratic Party (PSD), he has represented Cluj County in the Chamber of Deputies since 2008.

== Biography ==
Born in Ciubanca, Cluj County, he attended Andrei Mureșanu High School in nearby Dej from 1970 to 1974. He then enrolled in a metallurgy school in Aiud, graduating in 1976 with a diploma in forging, hardening, and tempering. In 1978, he entered the mechanics faculty of the Cluj-Napoca Polytechnic Institute. He graduated first in his class in 1981, earning a junior engineer's degree. He worked as a junior engineer in training at a metals factory in Aiud from 1981 to 1982.

Itu moved to a factory in Dej in 1982, and would remain there until 2008. He held a junior engineer's position there from 1982 to 1984; his activity focused on paper manufacture and metal products. Between 1984 and 1987, he was head of construction installations. From 1987 to 1990, he directed the anti-corrosion workshop. Between 1990 and 2002, he headed the replacement parts and equipment section. From 2002 to 2008, he was director of the entire factory.

Itu entered politics in 1994, when he joined the PSD. In 2000, he became head of the party's Dej chapter. In 2010, he took on the role of vice president in its Cluj County chapter, and is a member of the party's national council. Elected to the Dej city council in 2000, he served until 2004. That year, he was elected to the Cluj County Council, serving until 2008.

In 2008, Itu was elected to the Chamber of Deputies, where he was assigned to the political economy committee. In April 2010, he became one of the PSD group's deputy leaders. In 2012, he was re-elected, winning close to 60% of the vote. In the new parliament, he became secretary of the political economy committee and returned as a deputy leader of the PSD members.

He is married. He sits on the leadership committee of FC Unirea Dej football club. In 1999, he received a patent for a filtration device.
