= Marina Hociotă =

Romanian nun and nurse

- Born: 19 August 1896; Szelistye, Austria-Hungary
- Died: 9 July 1977 (aged 80); Nămăești Monastery, Socialist Republic of Romania
- Other names: Mina Hociotă
- Occupation: nun
- Known for: acting as a front line nurse during World War I

Marina Hociotă (Romanian pronunciation: [maˈrina ˈhotʃjotə]; 19 August 1896 – 7 July 1977), also known as Mina Hociotă, was a Romanian nun who acted as a front line nurse during World War I.

== Early years ==
Marina was born on 19 August 1896 in a shepherd family from Săliște (then part of Austria-Hungary).

As a child, she was described as unusually courageous. She rode the horses of the family when she was 9 years old.

The death of her father, who died of gout before she was 12 years old, and the compulsory introduction of the Hungarian language in the Romanian schools in Hungary, implemented in 1907 through the new education laws (also called the "Apponyi laws"), led Marina to leave her home village and cross the Carpathian mountains to Văratec Monastery in Romania at the age of 14. There she was ordained as a nun at the age of 18 and took the monastic name Mina, under the patronage of her aunt Mother Melania Cruțiu.

She shared the pain of leaving her home in a letter to her biographer, priest Grigorie Popescu: "I joined the convent due to the Hungarian persecution, which took us the freedom to speak our mother tongue in school, where we were taught only in Hungarian".

== World War I ==
After the outbreak of the World War I (1914), during the two years of Romanian neutrality, special nursing courses were organized by the Red Cross in several centers in the country, including the Văratec Monaster. The young nun volunteered: "You can imagine what joy we felt when we were able to serve and help our brothers who engaged in the struggle to free us from the Hungarian foreign yoke."

In May 1916 the War Ministry prepared the general mobilization and Mother Mina was assigned to the Tecuci Regional Hospital. After Romania's entry into the war (August 1916) and after the territorial losses that took place during the first months of war, including the occupation of Bucharest, the front stabilized in southern Moldavia. Campaign and regional hospitals behind the front were full of wounded.

After her work had been noticed by her superiors, Mother Mina was authorized to wear a military uniform and she was mobilized close to the front line at Mărășești, where she received the rank of second lieutenant.

Mother Mina initially worked as a nurse in the hospital, but, when the fighting resumed, she moved closer to the front line trenches, where she took care of evacuating the wounded and transporting them to sanitary trains.

In the summer of 1917, during the Battle of Mărășești, while boarded on a military train that transported the wounded from Mărășești to Vaslui and Iași, she was seriously injured on her left thigh. Her foot was rescued from amputation at the hospital in Iași by doctor Gheorghiu. Impressed by her medical knowledge, the doctors suggested she stayed at Hospital no. 271 in Iași, led by Professor Gerota.

After the outbreak of typhus epidemic in Iași, Doctor Gerota asked her to stay, saying, "There is no one to cry after you".

On 7 July 1918, by High Royal Decree, Mother Mina was decorated with the "Commemorative Cross".

== Later years ==
She returned after the war to Văratec Monastery, with a clear conscience: "We, the nuns and the monks, threw ourselves into the uncertainty of life ... for the country and we served faithfully and went to war with all our hearts, to help the wounded for whom we worked with a holy feeling, to help them in suffering... We fulfilled our duty not as men or women, but as soldiers of the Lord and our country, by obeying to the end, till the end of the war."

After her aunt's death in 1923, Mother Mina moved to Nămăești Monastery, Argeș County.

In the 1930s, with the blessing of Patriarch Miron Cristea, she enrolled at the "Regina Elisabeta" Charity Nursing Institute in Bucharest.

At the time of the outbreak of the Second World War, Mother Mina was 45 years old. She was mobilized again and sent to the Câmpulung Muscel Hospital. She became an active member of the "Romanian War Charity Sisters Association".

Her bravery, as well as her charity, were not forgotten many years after the end of the Second World War. In 1968, Mother Mina was awarded the Military Virtue Medal - 1st Class - in front of the Mausoleum of Mărăşeşti on the occasion of the 50th anniversary of the end of the World War I, along other war veterans.

She died on 9 July 1977 at the Nămăești Monastery.
