= Glăvile =

- Commune
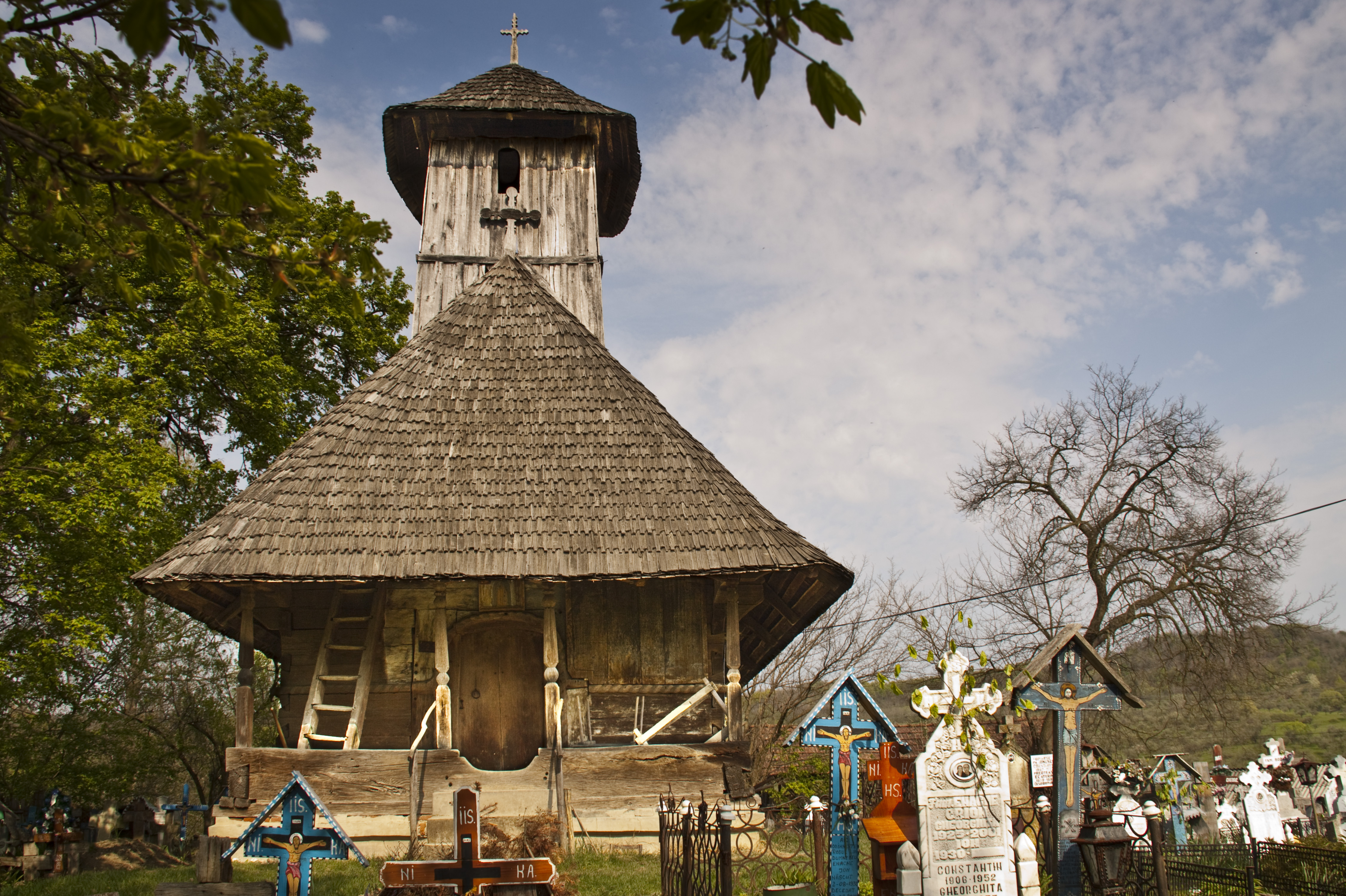
- Wooden church in Olteanca

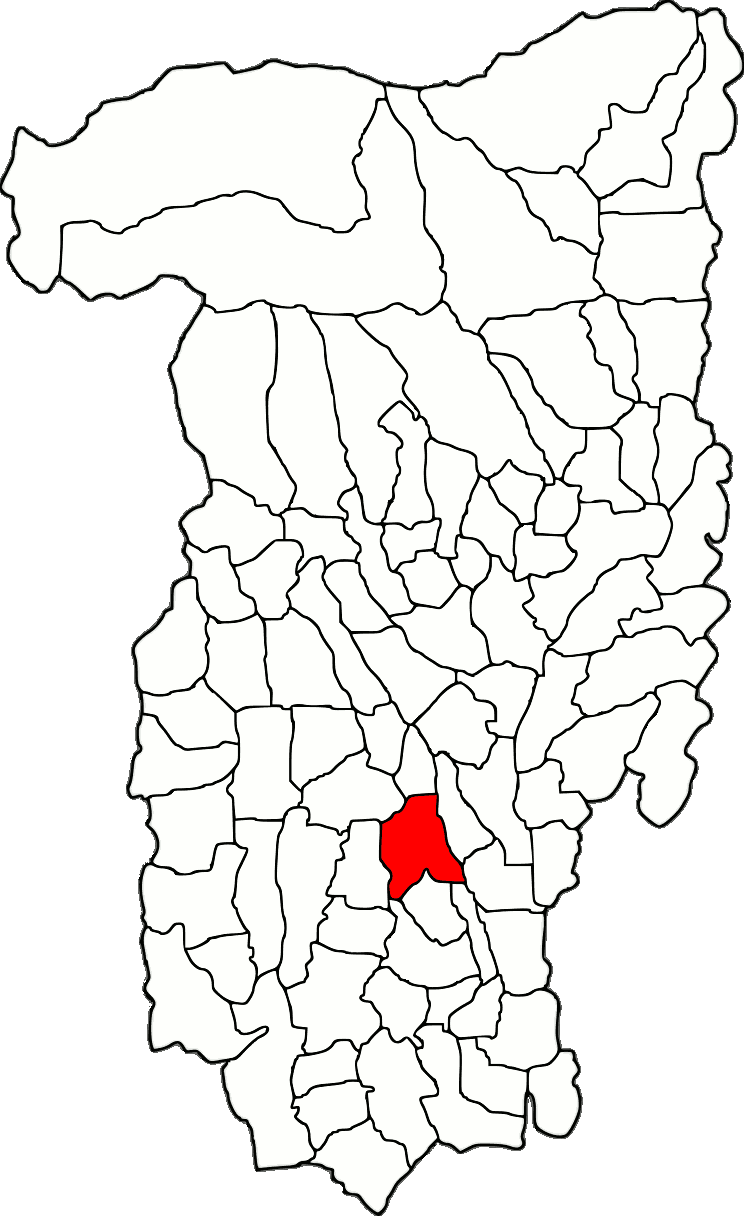
- Location in Vâlcea County

- Location in Romania
- Coordinates: 44°49′N 24°9′E
- Country: Romania
- County: Vâlcea

Government
  - Mayor (2020–2024): Iustin Duicu (PSD)
- Area: 50 km^{2} (19 sq mi)
- Elevation: 253 m (830 ft)
- Population (2021-12-01): 1,514
  - Density: 30/km^{2} (78/sq mi)
- Time zone: UTC+02:00 (EET)
  - Summer (DST): UTC+03:00 (EEST)
- Postal code: 247225
- Area code: +(40) 250
- Vehicle reg.: VL
- Website: www.glavile.ro

Glăvile is a commune in Vâlcea County, Oltenia, Romania. It is composed of five villages: Aninoasa, Glăvile, Jaroștea, Olteanca, and Voiculeasa.

Historical population
Year	Pop.	±%
1992	3,051	—
2002	2,587	−15.2%
2011	2,027	−21.6%
2021	1,514	−25.3%
Source: Census data

== Natives ==
- Bartolomeu Anania (1921–2011), Romanian Orthodox bishop
