= Bartolomeu Anania =

Romanian Orthodox bishop, translator and writer

Bartolomeu Anania (Romanian pronunciation: [bartoloˈmew anaˈni.a]; born Valeriu Anania [vaˈlerju]; March 18, 1921 – January 31, 2011) was a Romanian Orthodox bishop, translator, writer, and poet. He was the Metropolitan of Cluj, Alba, Crișana and Maramureș.

== Biography ==
=== Early life ===
Anania was born as Valeriu in Glăvile, Vâlcea County, to Vasile Anania and his wife Ana, the daughter of a priest. He attended primary school in Glăvile and entered the Bucharest Central Seminary in 1933.

At the age of 15, Anania, while a student at the Seminary, joined the local organization of the Cross Brotherhood (Frăția de Cruce), part of the Iron Guard, being introduced to it by an older student. However, he claimed that within the Cross Brotherhood at the Seminary, politics was not discussed and the group was not anti-Semitic, like the rest of the Iron Guard. Anania graduated the Seminary in 1941. That year, he spent three weeks under arrest, being accused of participating at the funeral of a member of the Iron Guard.

In 1942, he was tonsured a monk at the Antim Monastery, graduating from Bucharest's Mihai Viteazul High School the following year. In 1944, Hierodeacon Bartolomeu began studying Medicine and at the Cluj Conservatory, but he was expelled after organizing a student strike against the new communist government of Petru Groza. Afterwards, he continued his studies at the Theology Faculty of the University of Bucharest and the Theological Academies of Cluj and Sibiu, receiving his degree in the latter city in 1948.

=== Communist era ===
Anania, accused of being associated with the Iron Guard, was arrested by the Communist authorities in 1958 and incarcerated at the Aiud Prison. Another political prisoner at Aiud, Grigore Caraza, accused Anania of having actively participated in the 're-education' of prisoners, a charge categorically denied by Anania.

In August 1964, he was freed and only a few months later, in February 1965, he was sent by the communist regime to become an Archimandrite of the Romanian Orthodox Church in the United States and Canada, also editing a religious newspaper called Credința ("The Faith").

The short time between his release from prison and the time when he was sent to the United States has been seen as a sign that he had links to the Romanian Securitate. This idea has been supported by Ion Mihai Pacepa, who argued in a 1992 book that Archimandrite Bartolomeu was an agent of the External Intelligence department of the Securitate who was sent to the United States to divide the Romanian community. According to the latest results of the archive investigations, Metropolitan Bartolomeu Anania did not collaborate with the Securitate, "neither in detention, nor in freedom; neither in the country, nor abroad; neither with commitment, nor without commitment; neither with conspiracy, nor with names own, "as he himself stated during his life. His statements were confirmed by the documentary of Ioana Diaconescu (CNSAS researcher) on Bartolomeu Anania.

In 1974, he was recalled to Romania from the United States because of reports which mentioned a possible defection. From 1976 to 1982, he was head of the Church's Biblical and Missionary Institute; afterward, he retreated to Văratec Monastery, where he began retranslating Bible using as source for Old Testament the Septuagint (since the 1930s, the Romanian Orthodox Church Bible uses as its reference text the Masoretic Text).

=== After the 1989 Revolution ===
On January 21, 1993, he was chosen Archbishop of Vad, Feleac and Cluj. Following a controversial decision of the Holy Synod, in 2006, the archdiocese was elevated to the rank of metropolis, making Archbishop Bartolomeu the first Metropolitan of Cluj, Alba, Crișana and Maramureș.

In 1999, after the Church's failed attempt to convince politicians to endorse a proposal to give Senatorial seats to the Orthodox Church Synod's members, Archbishop Bartolomeu made two public requests. The first one was that the Church be able to select parliamentary candidates and then have priests urge parishioners during sermons to vote for them, while the second request repeated the proposal of making the 27-member Synod members of the Senate, arguing that the state was never really separated from the church. A law to this effect was drafted but never brought up for discussion in parliament.

Nevertheless, after the 2000 elections, he reconsidered the involvement of clergymen in politics. In 2004, he made a proposal, which was approved by the Synod, not to allow priests to run in elections, giving an ultimatum to priests currently involved in politics to choose between the priesthood and politics.

In 2007, he was a candidate for the office of Patriarch, but he lost to Daniel Ciobotea, who received from the Church Electoral College 95 votes, against 66 for Bartolomeu. Following unsuccessful treatment in Vienna in early 2011, Anania died in Cluj-Napoca of heart failure and aortic valve stenosis at age 89. He was buried in the hierarchs' crypt beneath the altar of the city's Dormition of the Theotokos Cathedral.

== Opinions ==
Metropolitan Bartolomeu was known as a conservative voice within the church. Politically, he asserted that he had always been attracted by the right wing. Voicing disagreement with the Western world, he argued that it is built exclusively on politics and economics, lacking any trace of spirituality, culture or religion. Following the repeal of Article 200 (regarding homosexuality), he decried the Westernization of Romania, claiming that "Europe asks us to accept sex, homosexuality, vices, drugs, abortions and genetic engineering, including cloning".

He also condemned the way in which television stations "manipulate" viewers and use violent programs to "poison the souls of Romanians", arguing that such programs are harming people's personalities and make them unable to tell good from evil.

In 2002, he was among a group of intellectuals who voiced their opposition to the building of a vampire theme park called Dracula Park, claiming that vampires are not a part of Romanian mythology (which instead has other monsters, like Muma Pădurii and zgripţuroaica).

While he supported the neutrality of the Church in politics, in 2007 he did join seven other high-ranking Orthodox clerics in signing an appeal against the decision of the parliament to begin impeachment proceedings against President Traian Băsescu, calling the procedure "immoral politics".

Regarding ecumenism, Bartolomeu argued that unifying all Christians within one Church is a far-fetched goal.

Bartolomeu Anania, as Metropolitan, joined the dispute over the biometric passports, signing in 2009 a public statement (together with all the bishops of his metropolitan see), in which he claimed that the usage of biometric chips in passports is offensive to the Romanian people, whom, he claims, are therefore treated as a potential gang of criminals. He also made clear his worry about the possibility of using microchip implants.
