= Recea-Cristur =

- Commune
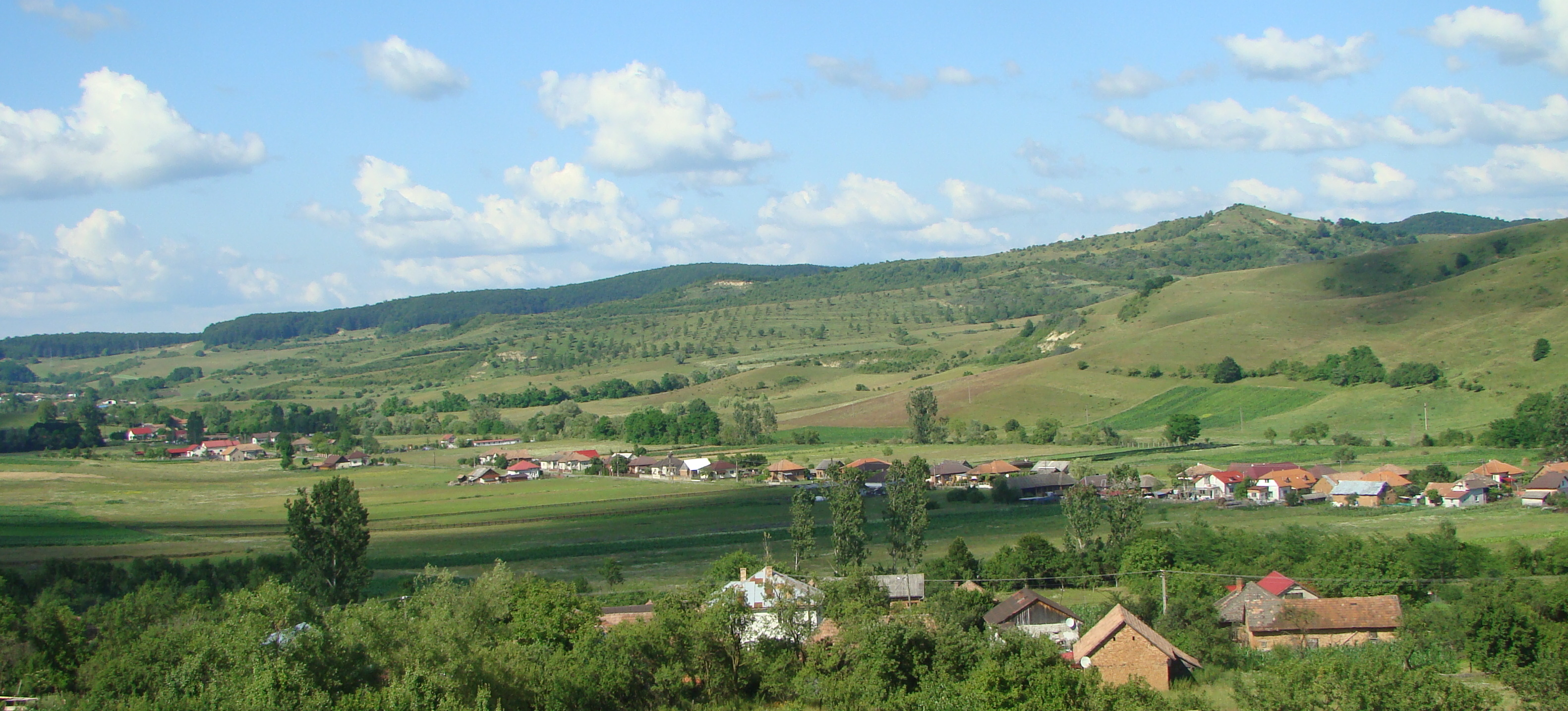

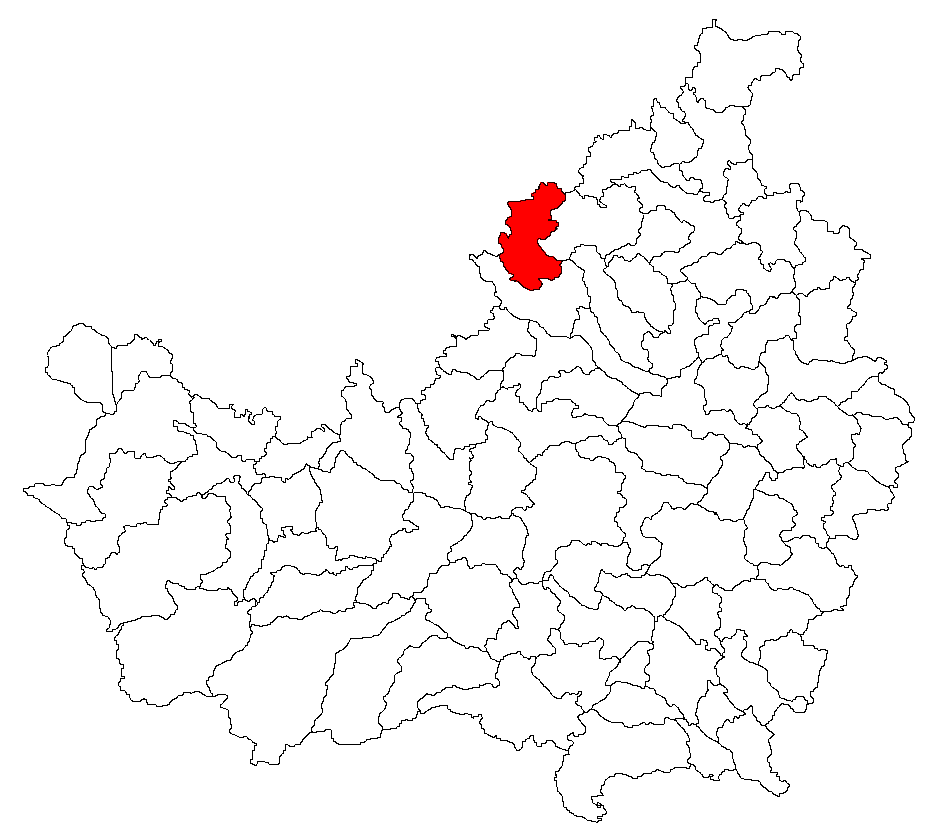
- Location in Cluj County

- Location in Romania
- Coordinates: 47°04′49″N 23°31′22″E
- Country: Romania
- County: Cluj
- Subdivisions: Căprioara, Ciubanca, Ciubăncuța, Elciu, Escu, Jurca, Osoi, Pustuța, Recea-Cristur

Government
  - Mayor (2020–2024): Laurian-Alexandru Rus (PNL)
- Area: 76.19 km^{2} (29.42 sq mi)
- Elevation: 435 m (1,427 ft)
- Population (2021-12-01): 1,453
  - Density: 19.07/km^{2} (49.39/sq mi)
- Time zone: UTC+02:00 (EET)
  - Summer (DST): UTC+03:00 (EEST)
- Postal code: 407480
- Area code: (+40) 0264
- Vehicle reg.: CJ
- Website: recea-cristur.ro

Recea-Cristur (Hungarian: Récekeresztúr) is a commune in Cluj County, Transylvania, Romania. In Romanian, "recea" refers to a cold place. The commune is composed of nine villages: Căprioara (Kecskeháta), Ciubanca (Alsócsobánka), Ciubăncuța (Felsőcsobánka), Elciu (Völcs), Escu (Veck), Jurca (Gyurkapataka), Osoi (Aszó), Pustuța (Pusztaújfalu), and Recea-Cristur.

== History ==
The first documentary mention of the village of Recea-Cristur dates back to the year 1320.

== Demographics ==
Historical population
Year	Pop.	±%
1850	2,947	—
1880	2,767	−6.1%
1890	3,148	+13.8%
1900	3,237	+2.8%
1910	3,449	+6.5%
1920	3,457	+0.2%
1930	3,712	+7.4%
1941	3,772	+1.6%
1956	4,339	+15.0%
1966	3,993	−8.0%
1977	3,149	−21.1%
1992	1,812	−42.5%
2002	1,701	−6.1%
2011	1,412	−17.0%
2021	1,453	+2.9%
Source: Census data

According to the census from 2002 there was a total population of 1,701 people living in this commune; of this population, 89.24% were ethnic Romanians, 9.93% ethnic Roma, and 0.76% ethnic Hungarians. At the 2021 census, Recea-Cristur had a population of 1,453, of which 65.18% were Romanians and 25.74% Roma.

== Natives ==
- Cornel Itu (born 1955), politician
