= Archdiocese of Vad, Feleac and Cluj =

Archdiocese of the Romanian Orthodox Church

Dormition of the Theotokos Cathedral in Cluj

The Archdiocese of Vad, Feleac and Cluj is an episcopal see of the Romanian Orthodox Church.

The cathedral of this archbishopric is the Dormition of the Theotokos Cathedral in Cluj.

== Bishops and Archbishops ==
- Nicolae Ivan (1921-1936)
- Nicolae Colan (1936-1957)
- Teofil Herineanu (1957-1992)
- Bartolomeu Anania (1993-2011)
- Andrei Andreicuț (2011-)
