= Dormition of the Theotokos Cathedral, Cluj-Napoca =

Romanian Orthodox church of Cluj-Napoca, Romania

Coordinates: 46°46′19″N 23°35′46″E

Dormition of the Theotokos Cathedral Catedrala Adormirea Maicii Domnului

Religion
- Affiliation: Eastern Orthodox
- District: Metropolitan of Cluj, Alba, Crișana and Maramureș
- Ecclesiastical or organisational status: Cathedral
- Leadership: Bartolomeu Anania
- Year consecrated: 1933

Location
- Location: Cluj-Napoca, Romania
- Interactive map of Dormition of the Theotokos Cathedral; Catedrala Adormirea Maicii Domnului

Architecture
- Architects: George Cristinel; Constantin Pomponiu
- Style: Romanian Revival
- Completed: 1933

Specifications
- Length: 44 m
- Width: 30 m
- Height (max): 64 m
- Dome: Eight
- Materials: stone

Website
- http://www.arhiepiscopia-ort-cluj.org

The Dormition of the Theotokos Cathedral (Romanian: Catedrala Adormirea Maicii Domnului) is the most famous Romanian Orthodox church of Cluj-Napoca, Romania. Built in a Romanian Brâncovenesc style, a synthesis of Renaissance and Byzantine architecture, it lies on the Avram Iancu Square, together with the Cluj-Napoca National Theatre and the Avram Iancu Statue.

The cathedral is the seat of the Metropolitan of Cluj, Alba, Crișana and Maramureș. It is dedicated to the Dormition of the Theotokos (Romanian: Adormirea Maicii Domnului).

== History ==
The cathedral was built between 1923 and 1933, after the Union of Transylvania with the Romanian Old Kingdom. Nicolae Ivan (1855–1936), the first bishop of the Bishopric of Cluj, had a very important contribution in suggesting the location of the cathedral and in obtaining the necessary funds for its construction, which began on 10 September 1923. The cornerstone was laid on 7 October 1923, at a ceremony attend by Crown Prince Carol II and Prime Minister Ion I. C. Brătianu.

The project of the cathedral was developed by the architects George Cristinel and Constantin Pomponiu, who also designed the Mausoleum of Mărășești.

On 5 November 1933 the cathedral was officially opened by Miron Cristea, the Patriarch of All Romania, Nicolae Bălan, the Metropolitan of Transylvania, and Nicolae Ivan, the Bishop of Cluj. The opening ceremony was also attended, among many others, by King Carol II and Crown Prince Michael I.

== Decoration ==
The main dome of the cathedral, inspired by the dome of Hagia Sophia in Istanbul, is surrounded by 4 Romanian Brâncovenesc style towers. The 18 large columns supporting the dome are sculpted in stone. The main material used for the construction of the cathedral was stone extracted from Baciu and Banpotoc. The cathedral has a length of 44 meters and a width of 30 meters, with a total area of 1320 m². The height of the tallest dome reaches a total height of 64 meters, with the height of the dome itself being 38 meters. The dome has a diameter of 15 meters.

The interior murals were painted between 1928 and 1933 by artists Anastase Demian and Catul Bogdan, both professors at the local Art Academy.

== Gallery ==

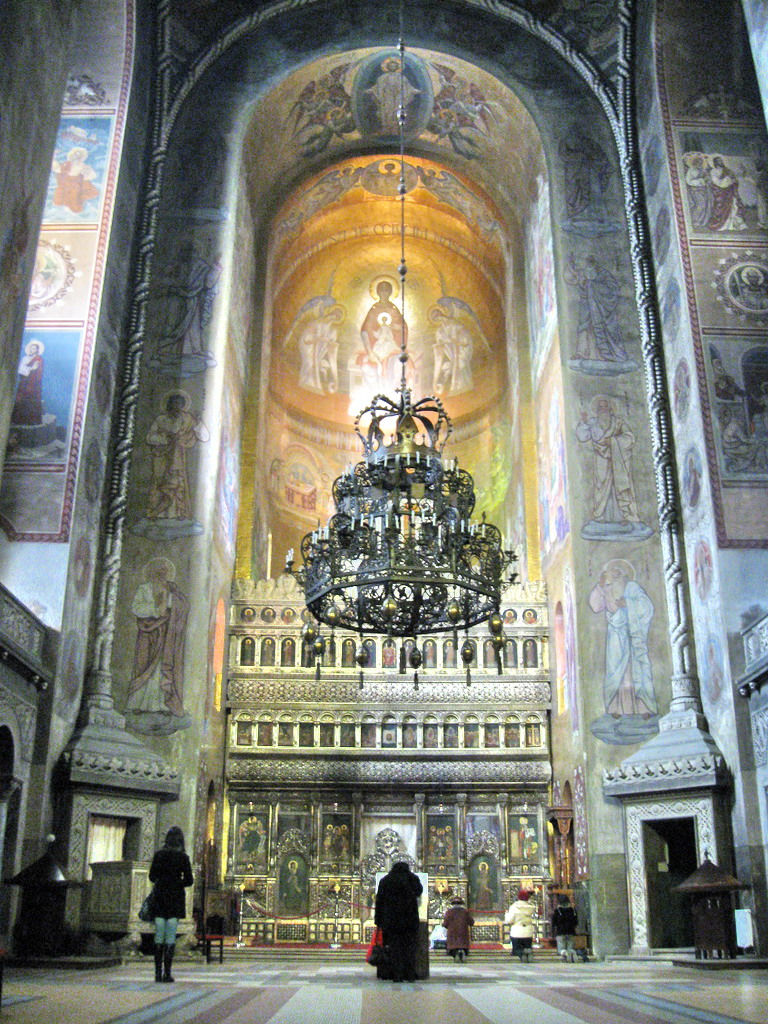
