= Nicolae Ivan (bishop) =

Romanian priest (1855–1936)

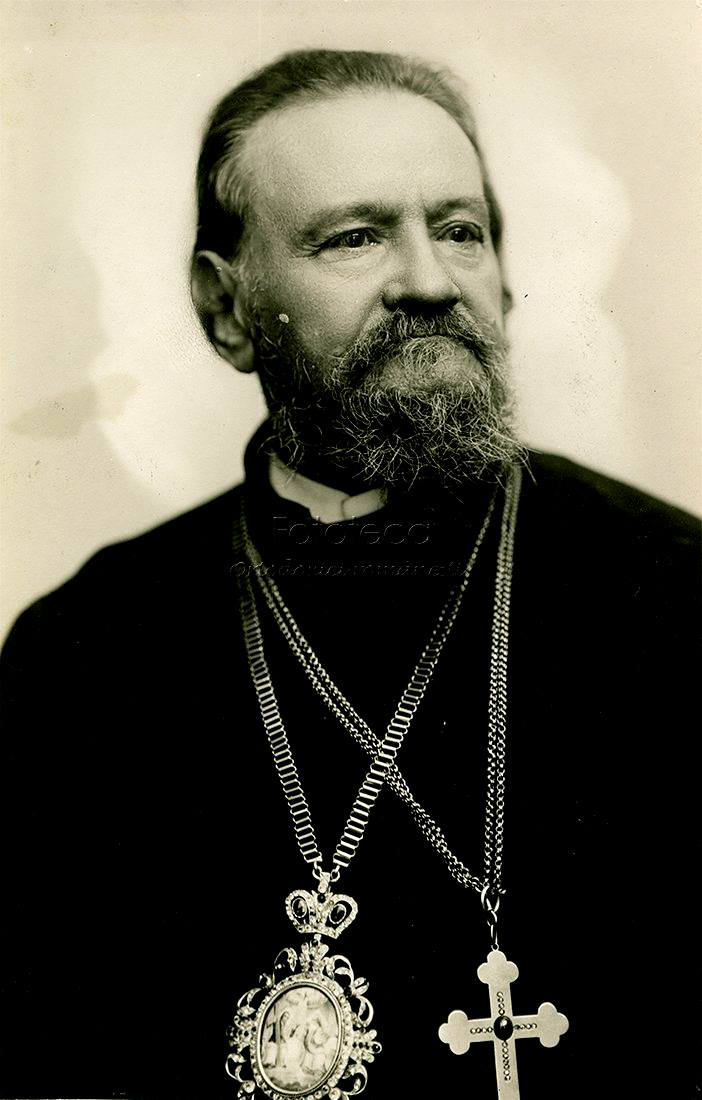
Nicolae Ivan

Nicolae Ivan (Romanian pronunciation: [nikoˈla.e iˈvan]; May 17, 1855 – February 3, 1936) was a Romanian cleric. He was the first bishop of the Vad, Feleac and Cluj Diocese, where he served from 1921 until his death.
