= Dumitru D. Roșca =

Romanian philosopher and professor

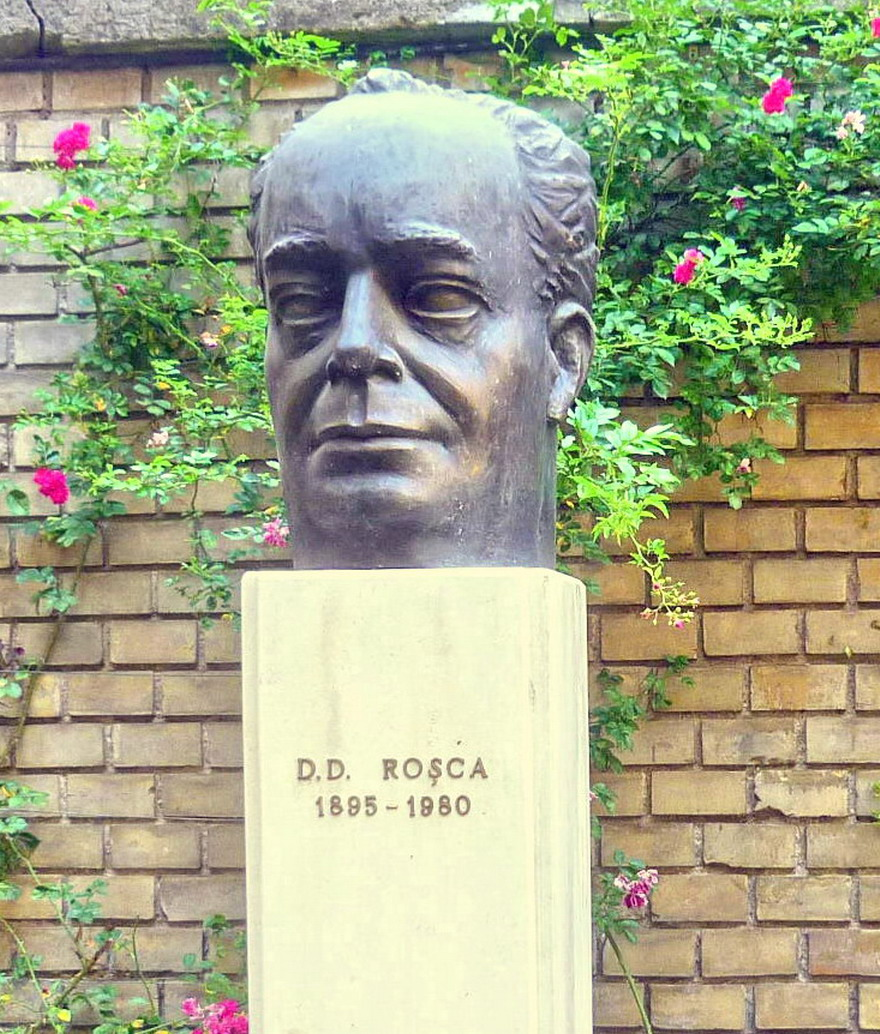
- Roșca's bust in the Babeș-Bolyai University
- Born: January 29, 1895; Szelistye, Austria-Hungary
- Died: August 25, 1980 (aged 85); Cluj-Napoca, Socialist Republic of Romania
- Education: University of Paris
- Scientific career
- Fields: Philosopher, Professor
- Workplaces: Babeș-Bolyai University, Cluj-Napoca

Dumitru D. Roṣca (January 29, 1895 – August 25, 1980) was a Romanian philosopher, professor and member of the Romanian Academy.

== Biography ==
Dumitru Roşca attended philosophy classes in Paris at Sorbonne. He is best known for his doctoral thesis defended at Sorbonne in 1928: "The Influence of Taine on Hegel". The book was dedicated to Émile Bréhier.

Dumitru Roşca translated Georg Wilhelm Friedrich Hegel's works into Romanian. He also translated Hegel's "Life of Jesus" into French.

He published in French "Existénce tragique: An Attempt of Philosophical Synthesis". He contributed through his writings to the theory of existentialism.

His works were influenced by Hegel and Søren Kierkegaard.

== Works ==
- Istoria filosofiei (1964)
- Prelegeri de estetică (1966)
- Ştiinţa logicii (1966)
- Studii filosofice (1967)
- Însemnări despre Hegel (1967)
- Influenţa lui Hegel asupra lui Taine (1968)
- Existenţa tragică (1968)
- Prelegeri de filosofie a istoriei (1969)
- Studii şi eseuri filosofice (1970)
- Oameni şi climate (1971)
