= List of fortified churches in Transylvania =

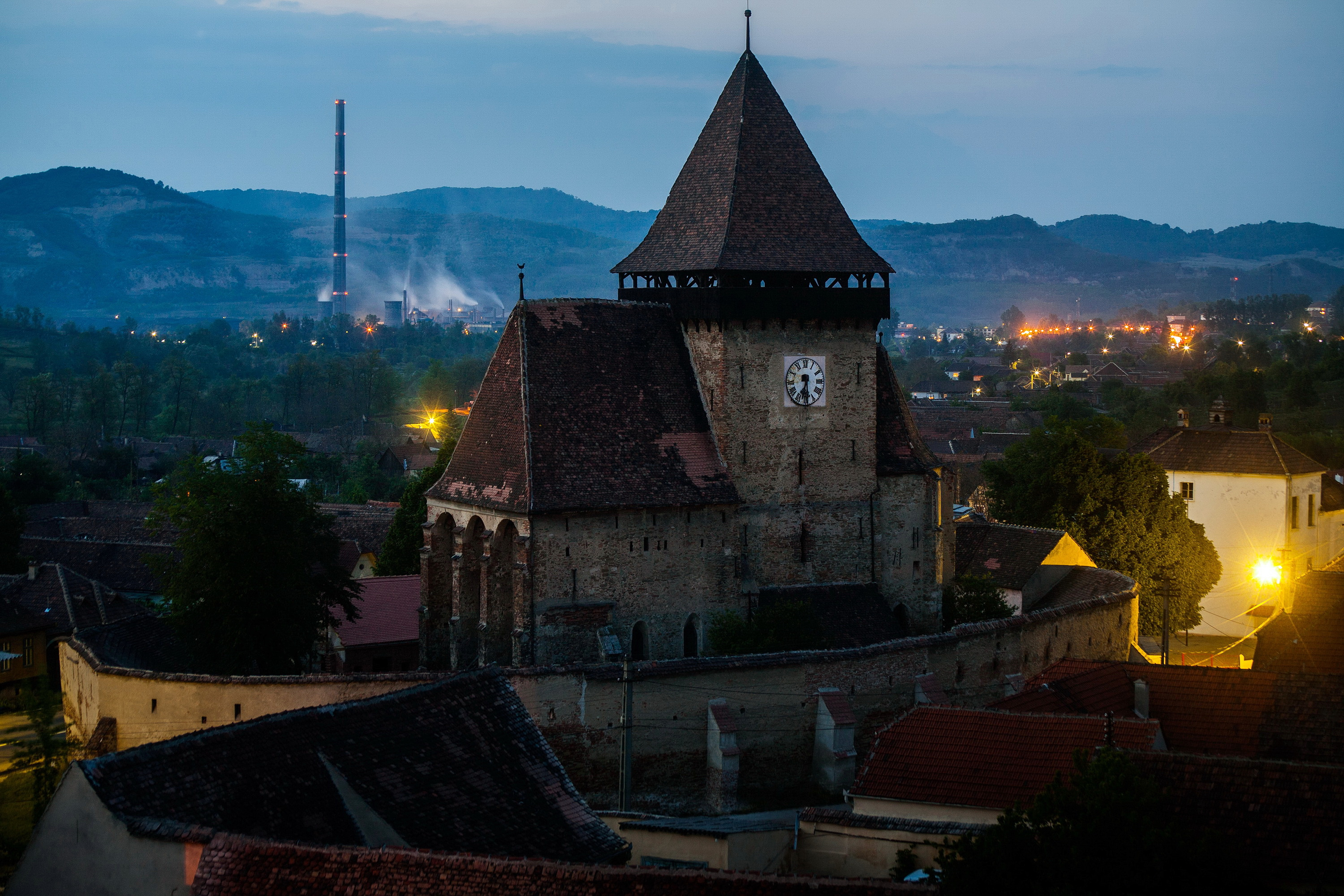
Fortified church of Axente Sever

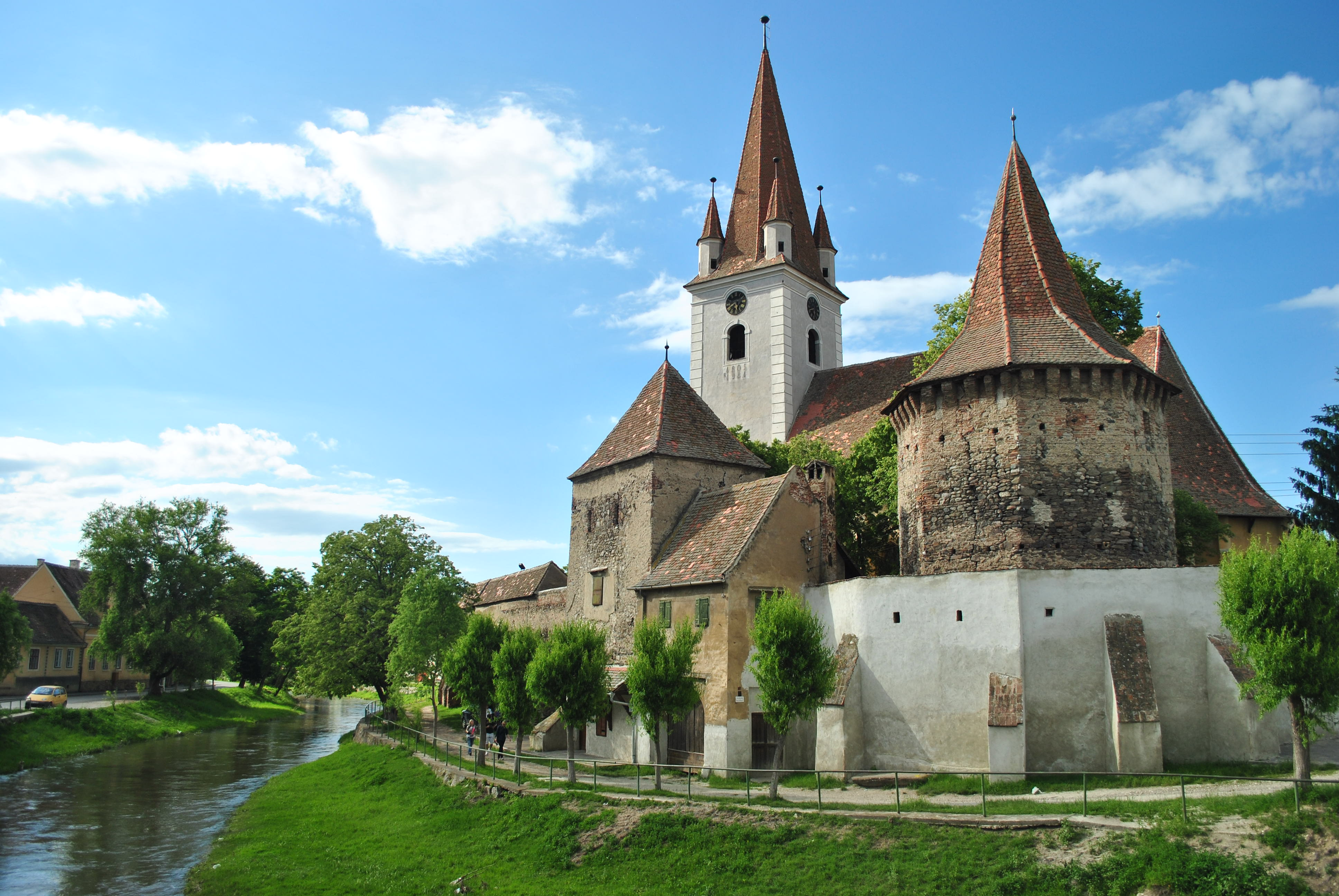
Fortified church of Cristian, Sibiu County

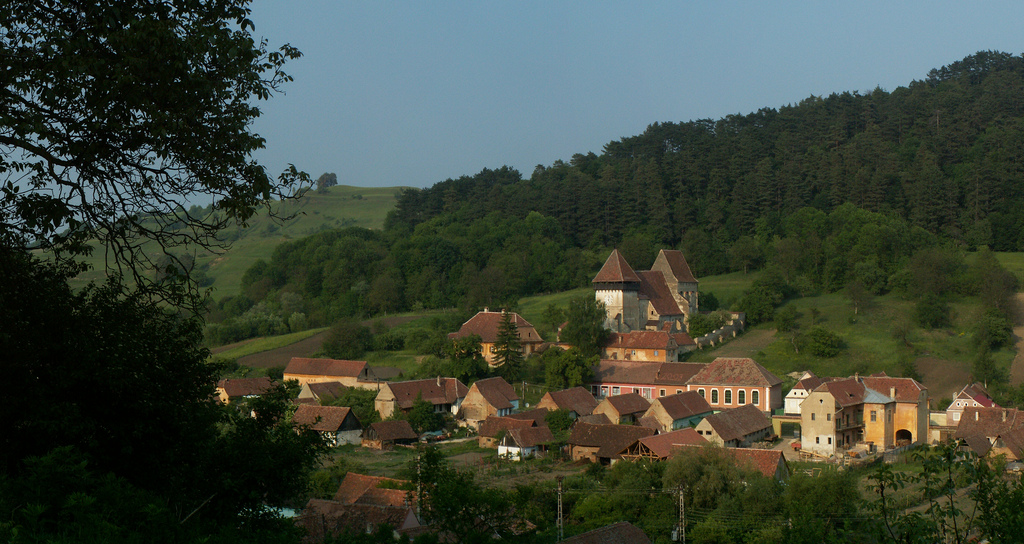
Fortified church of Copșa Mare

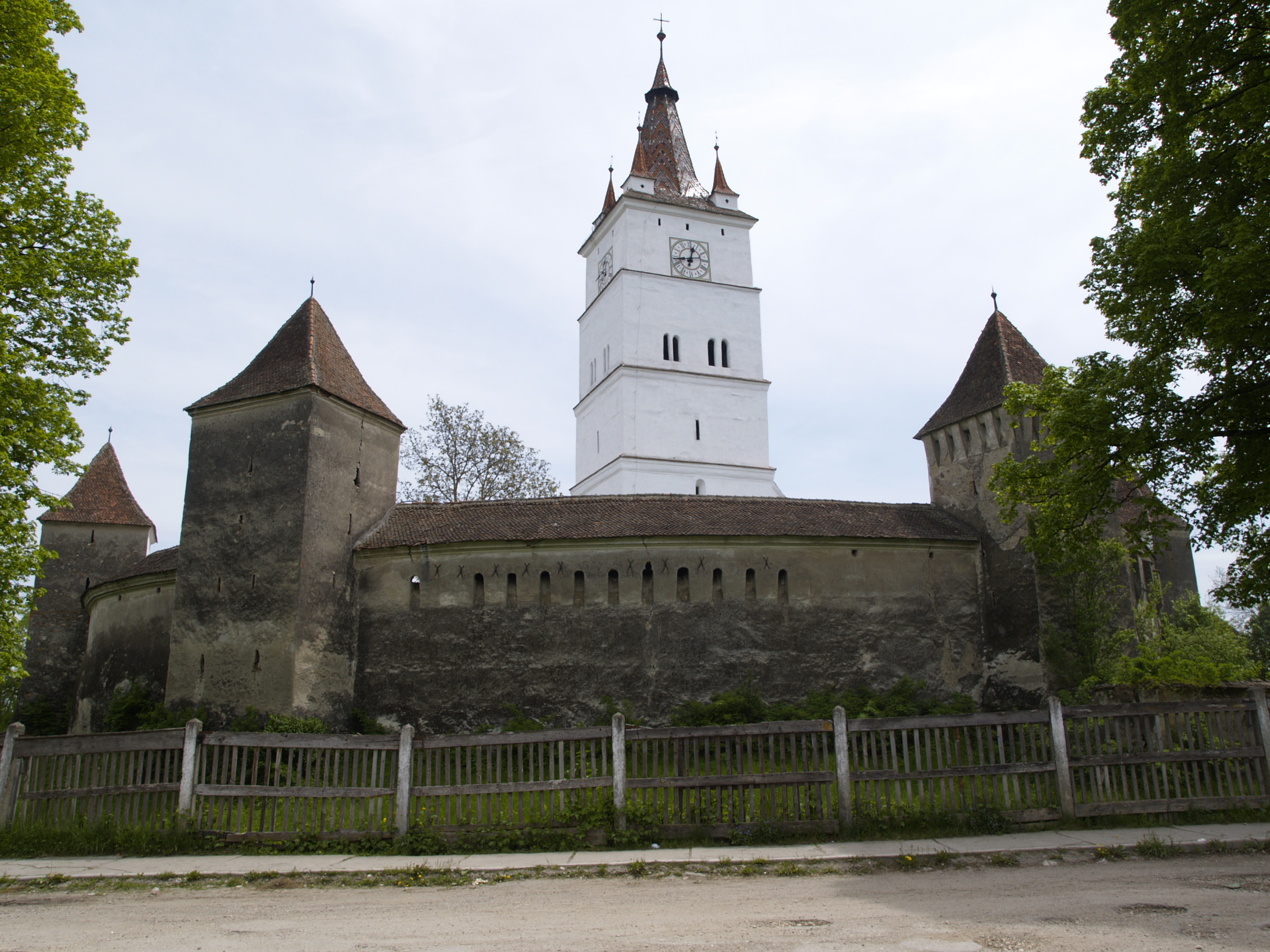
Fortified church of Hărman

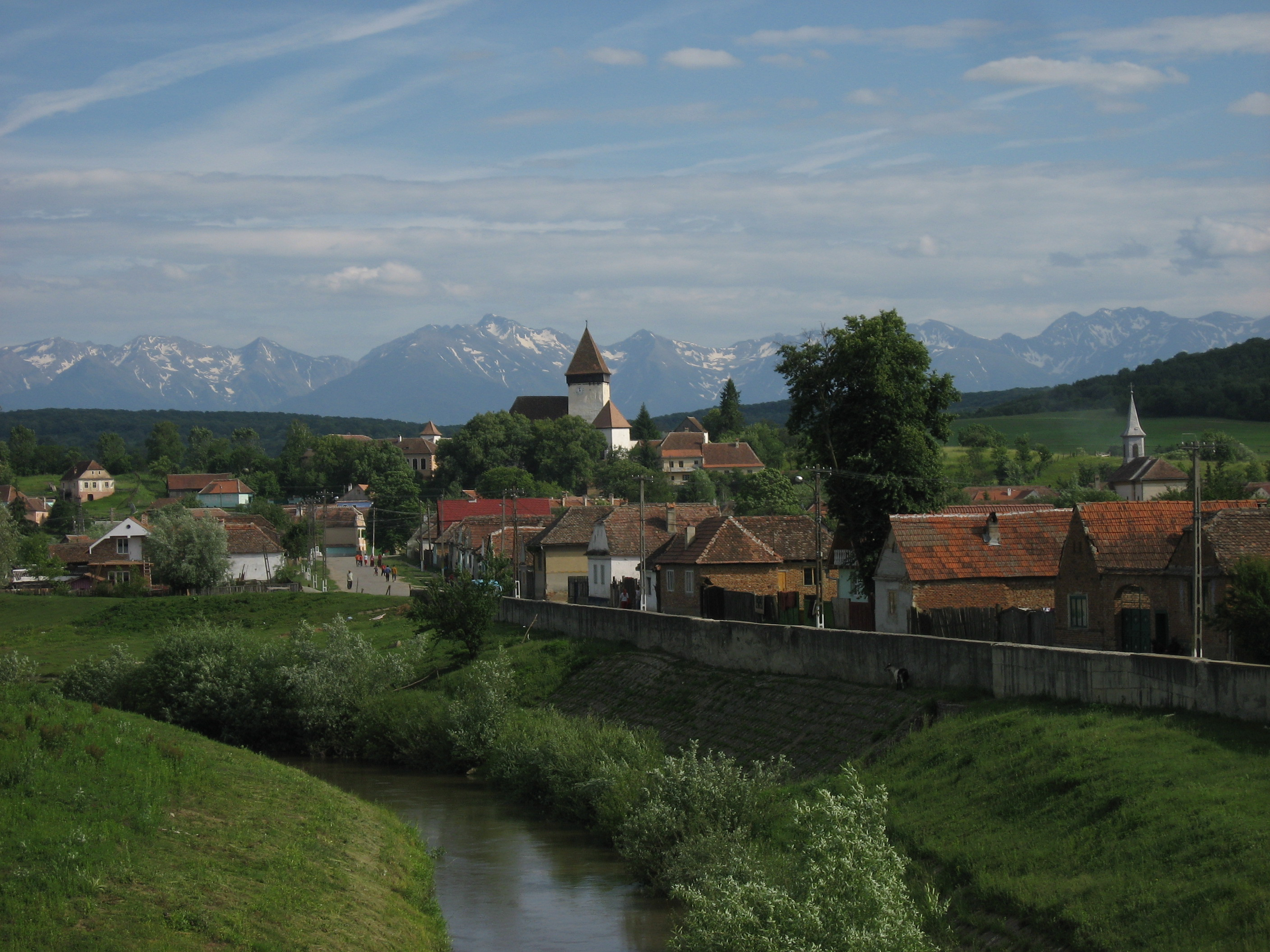
Hosman and its fortified church

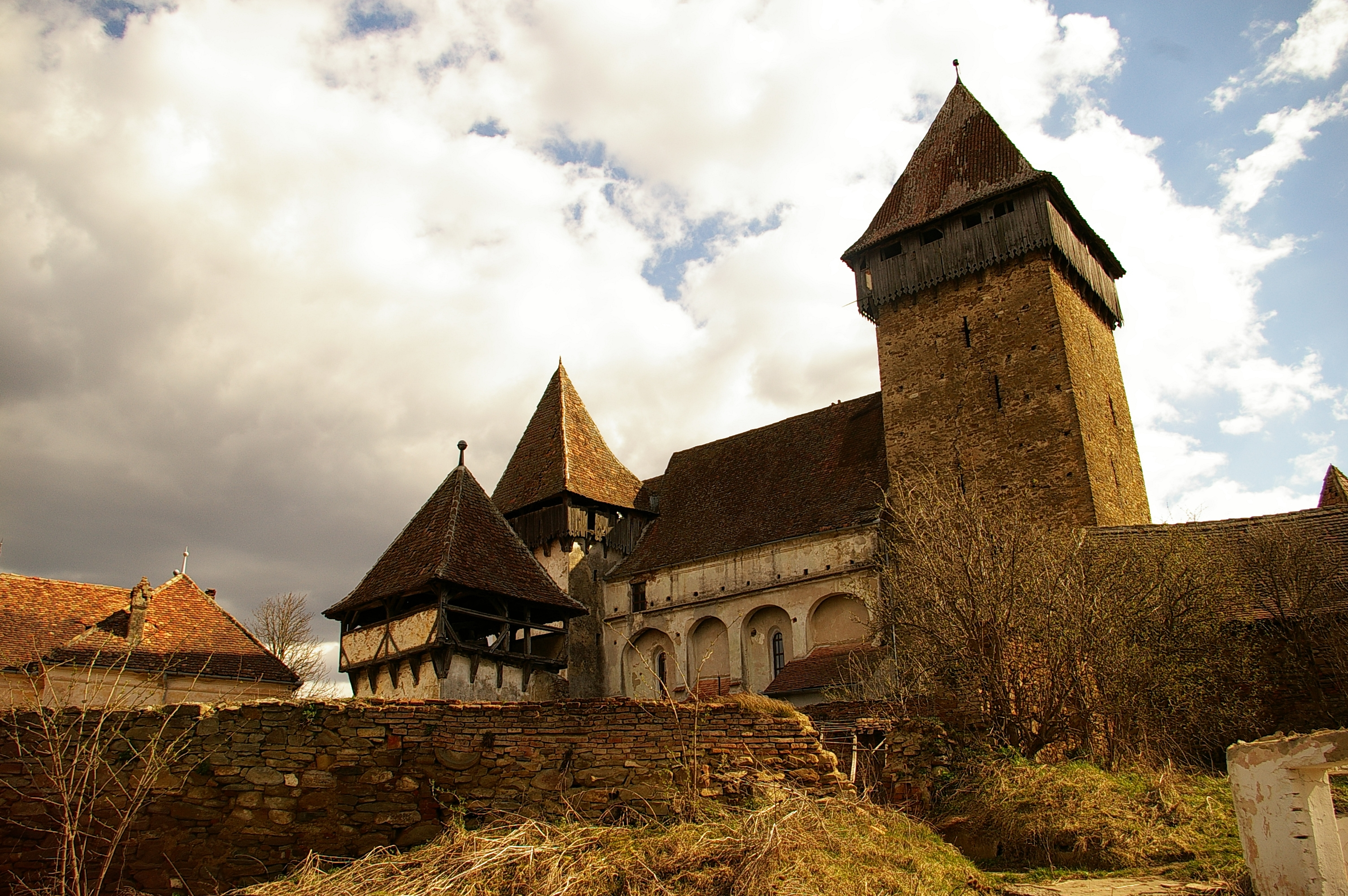
Fortified church of Iacobeni

The following is a list of fortified churches in Transylvania. Southeastern Transylvania in Romania has one of the highest numbers of still-existing fortified churches, which were built during the 13th to 16th centuries, a period during which Transylvania was part of the Kingdom of Hungary and the Ottoman Empire was rising. More than 150 villages in the area count various types of fortified churches, seven of them being included in the UNESCO World Heritage under the name of Villages with fortified churches in Transylvania.

== List of Saxon towns and villages ==
The following is a list of Transylvanian Saxon towns and villages with a fortified church.

1. Agârbiciu
2. Agnita
3. Alma Vii
4. Alțâna
5. Amnaș
6. Apold
7. Archita
8. Ațel
9. Avrig
10. Axente Sever
11. Băgaciu
12. Bărcuț
13. Bazna
14. Beia
15. Biertan
16. Bod
17. Boian
18. Bradu
19. Brateiu
20. Brădeni
21. Bruiu
22. Bunești
23. Buzd
24. Câlnic
25. Cața
26. Cenade
27. Chirpăr
28. Cincșor
29. Cincu
30. Cisnădie (end of the 12th century)
31. Cisnădioara (2nd half of the 12th century)
32. Cloașterf
33. Codlea
34. Copșa Mare
35. Cricău
36. Cristian
37. Cristian (13th-15th centuries)
38. Criț
39. Curciu
40. Dacia
41. Daia, Mureș
42. Daia, Sibiu
43. Daneș
44. Dârlos
45. Dealu Frumos
46. Dobârca
47. Drăușeni
48. Dupuș
49. Feldioara
50. Felmer
51. Fișer
52. Gherdeal
53. Ghimbav
54. Gușterița (now a district of Sibiu, 13th-15th centuries)
55. Hamba (16th century)
56. Hălchiu, Brașov
57. Hărman
58. Hetiur
59. Homorod
60. Hosman
61. Iacobeni, Sibiu
62. Ighișu Nou
63. Jimbor, Brașov
64. Laslea
65. Măieruș
66. Mălâncrav
67. Marpod
68. Mediaș
69. Mercheașa
70. Merghindeal
71. Meșendorf
72. Metiș, Sibiu
73. Micăsasa
74. Miercurea Sibiului
75. Moardăș
76. Moșna
77. Motiș, Sibiu
78. Movile, Sibiu
79. Netuș
80. Nocrich
81. Noiștat
82. Ocna Sibiului
83. Orăștie (around 1400)
84. Ormenis, Brasov
85. Pelișor, Sibiu
86. Prejmer
87. Racoș
88. Râșnov
89. Richiș, Sibiu
90. Roadeș
91. Rodbav
92. Roșia, Sibiu
93. Rotbav
94. Ruja
95. Ruși
96. Sânpetru
97. Sântimbru
98. Saschiz
99. Seliștat
100. Slimnic
101. Stejărișu
102. Șaeș
103. Șard
104. Șaroș pe Târnave
105. Șeica Mare
106. Șeica Mică
107. Șelimbăr (13th century)
108. Șoala
109. Șoarș
110. Șomartin
111. Șura Mare (13th century)
112. Șura Mică (13th century)
113. Tălmaciu
114. Țapu
115. Toarcla
116. Turnișor (now a district of Sibiu, 12th-20th centuries)
117. Ungra
118. Valchid
119. Valea Viilor
120. Velț
121. Veseud
122. Viscri
123. Vulcan, Brașov
124. Vulcan, Mureș
125. Vurpăr, Alba
126. Vurpăr, Sibiu

== List of Székely towns and villages ==
The following is a list of Székely towns and villages with a fortified church.

1. Aita Mare
2. Arcuș
3. Armășeni
4. Baraolt
5. Biborțeni
6. Bodoc
7. Bicfalău
8. Calnic
9. Catalina
10. Cârța
11. Ciucsângeorgiu
12. Dârjiu
13. Delnița
14. Ghidfalău
15. Ilieni
16. Lăzarea
17. Leliceni
18. Misentea
19. Racu
20. Sânzieni
21. Sfântu Gheorghe
22. Turia
23. Zăbala

== Additional examples ==
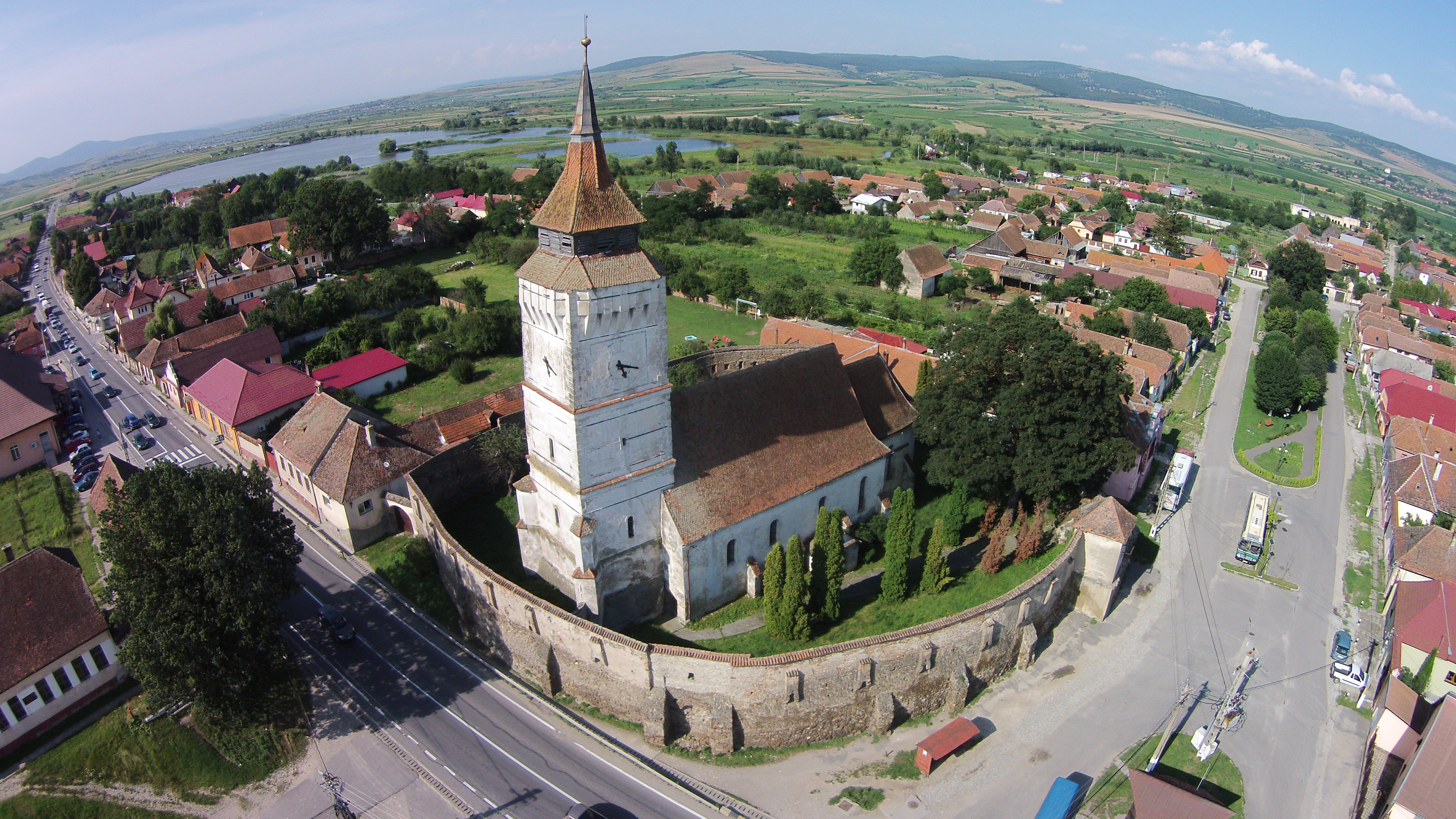
Fortified church of Rotbav

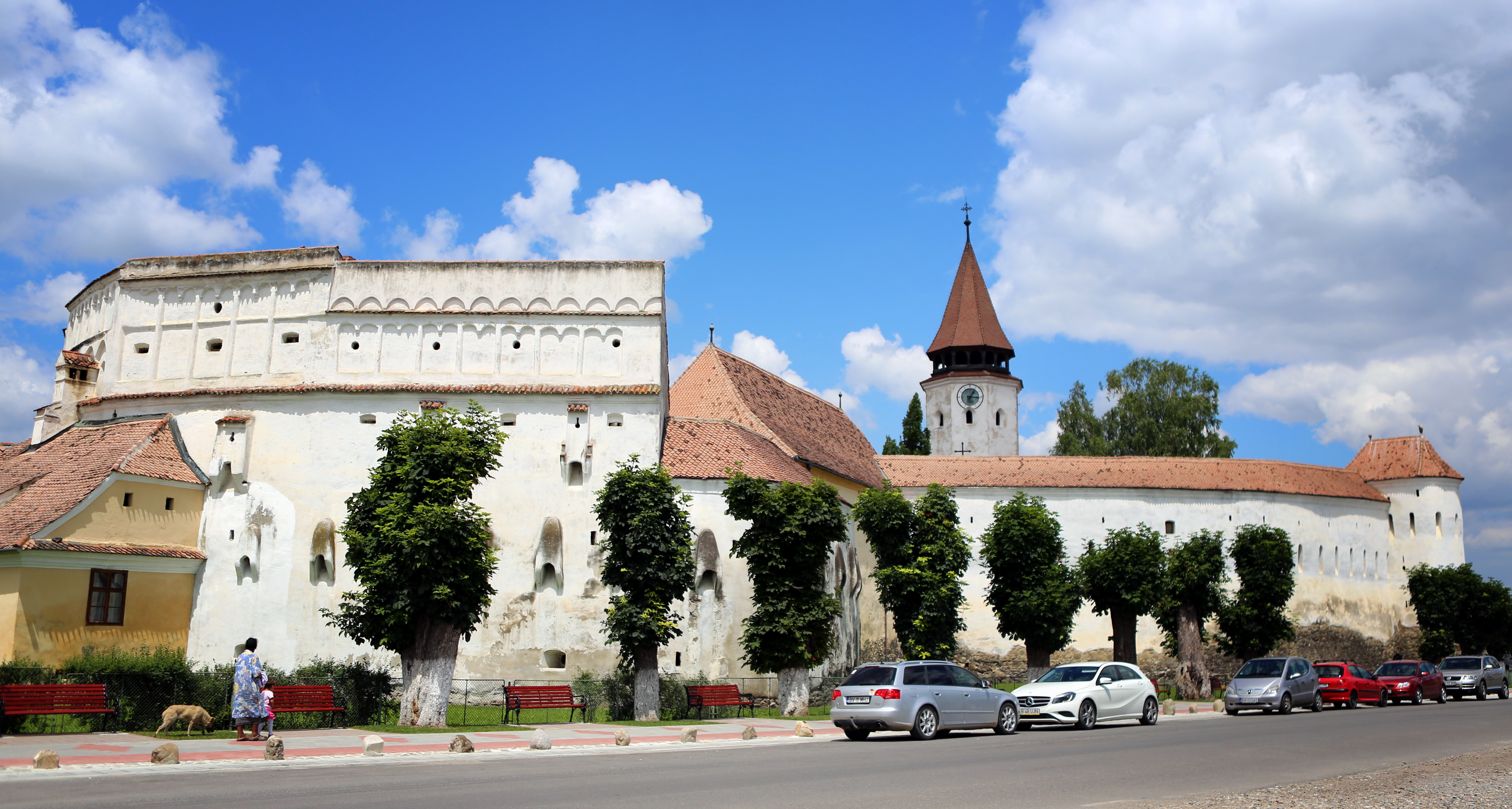
Fortified church of Prejmer

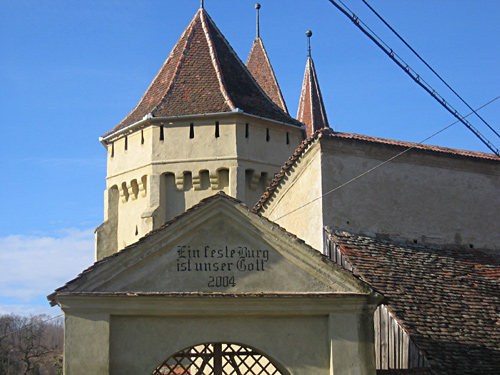
Fortified church of Șeica Mică

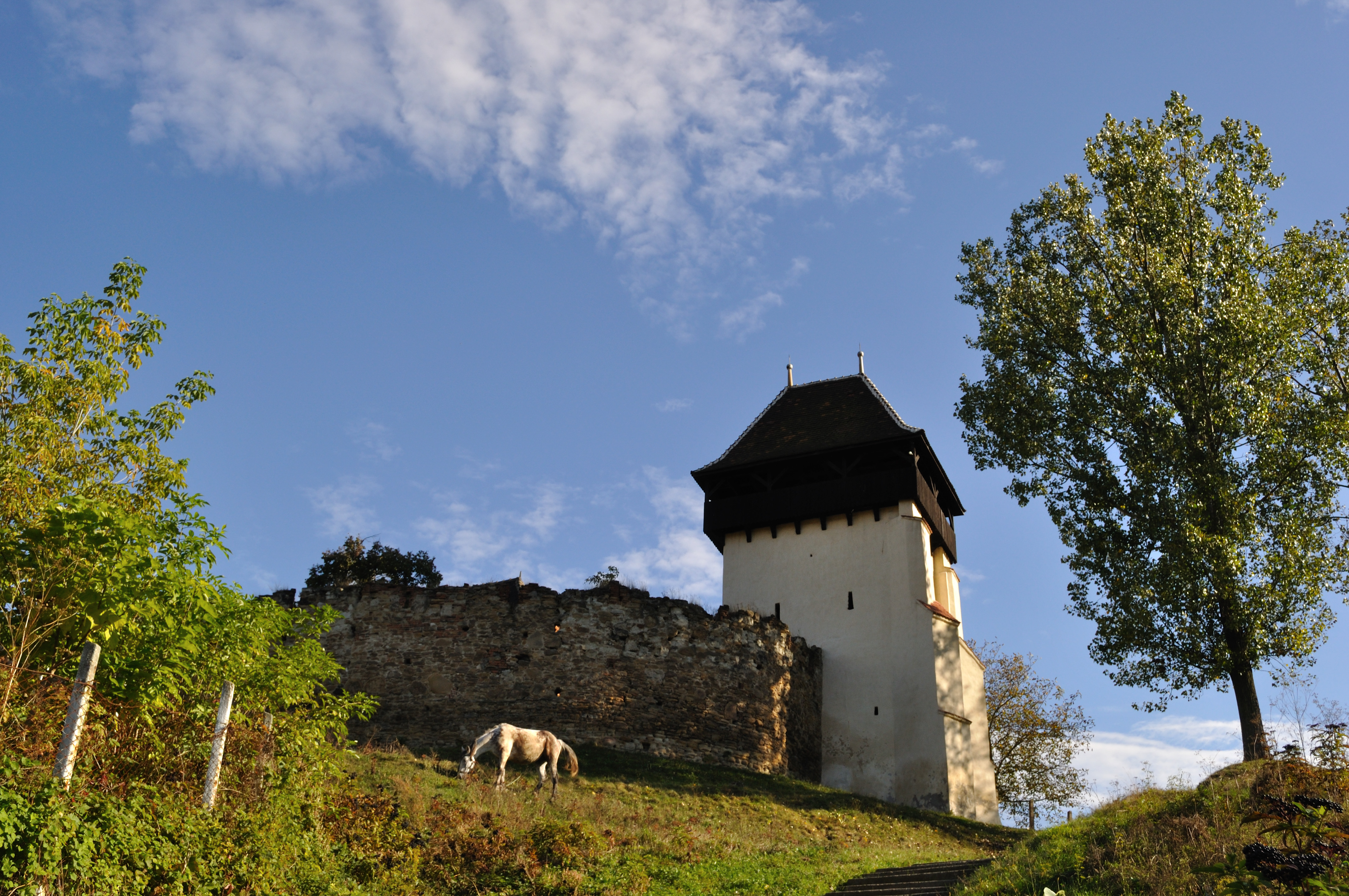
Fortified church of Ţapu

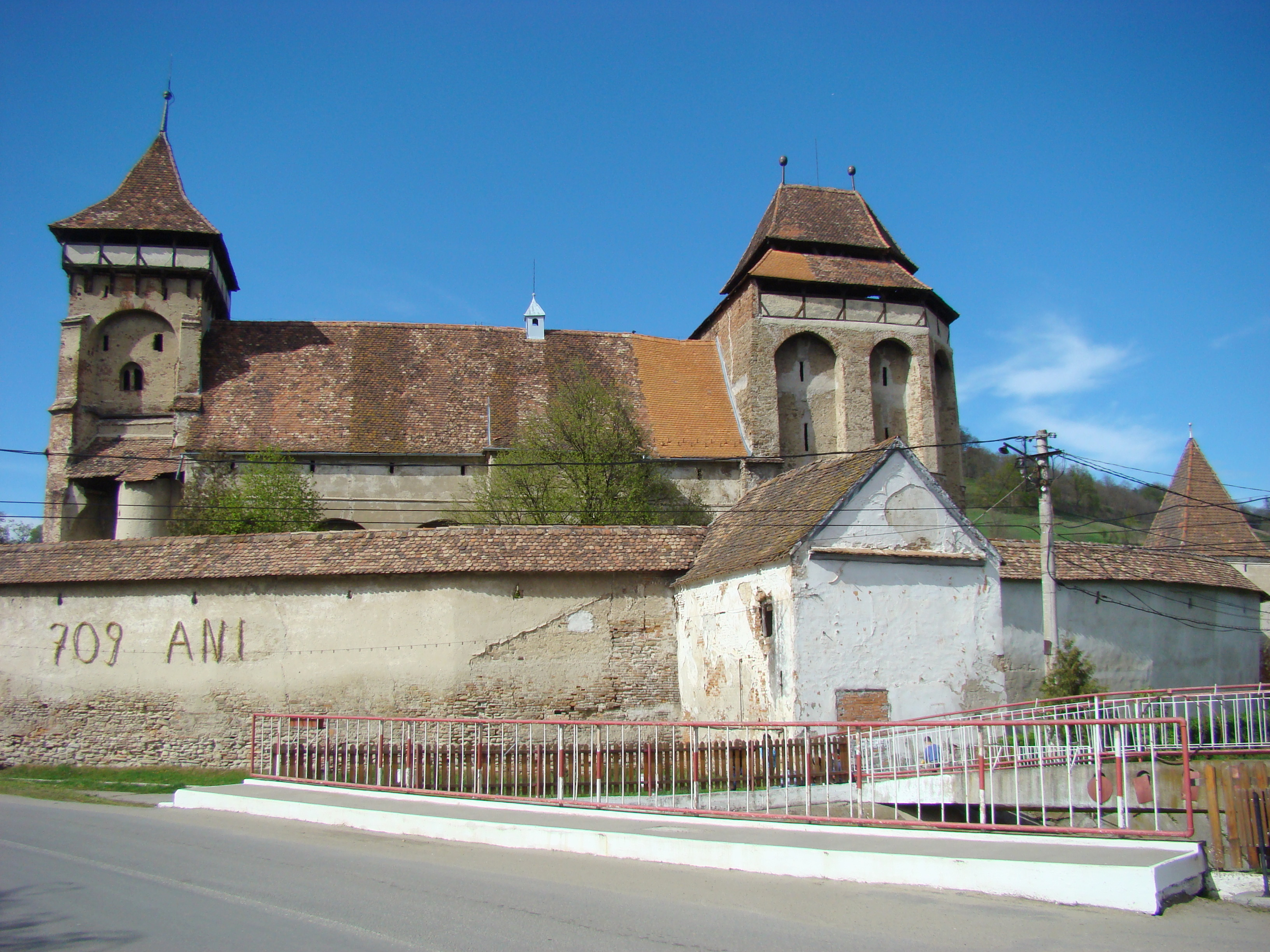
Fortified church of Valea Viilor

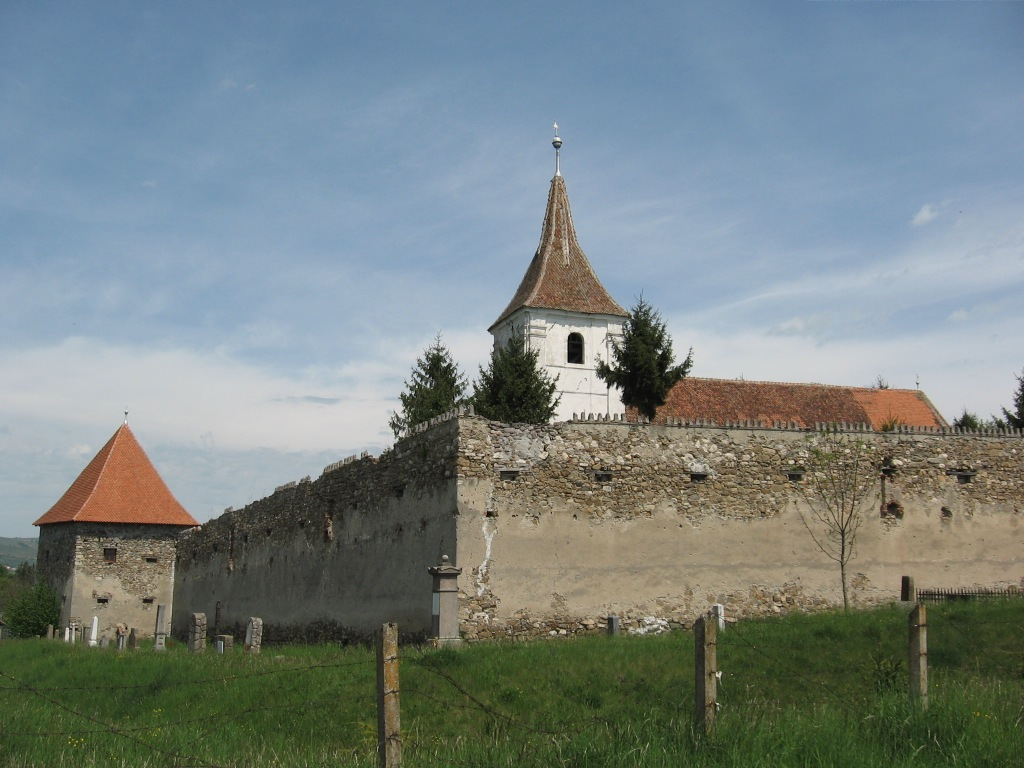
Fortified church of Aita Mare

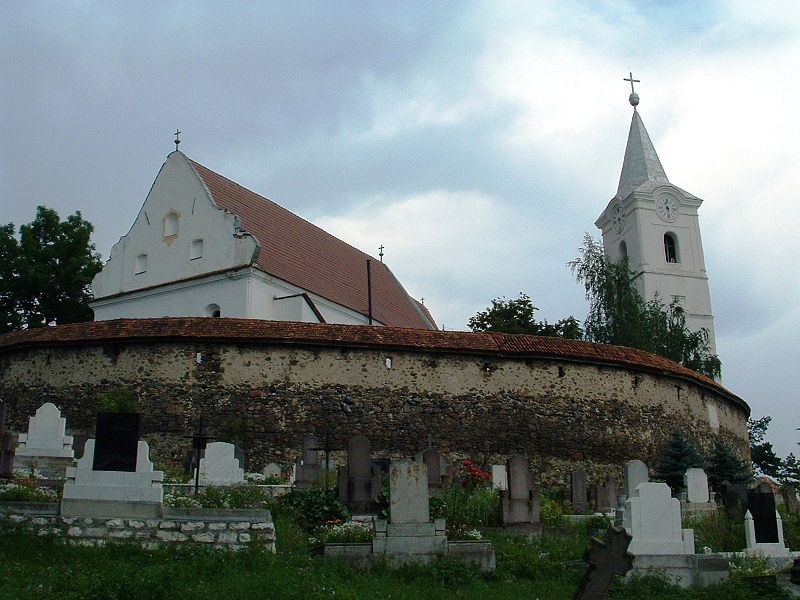
Fortified church of Cârța

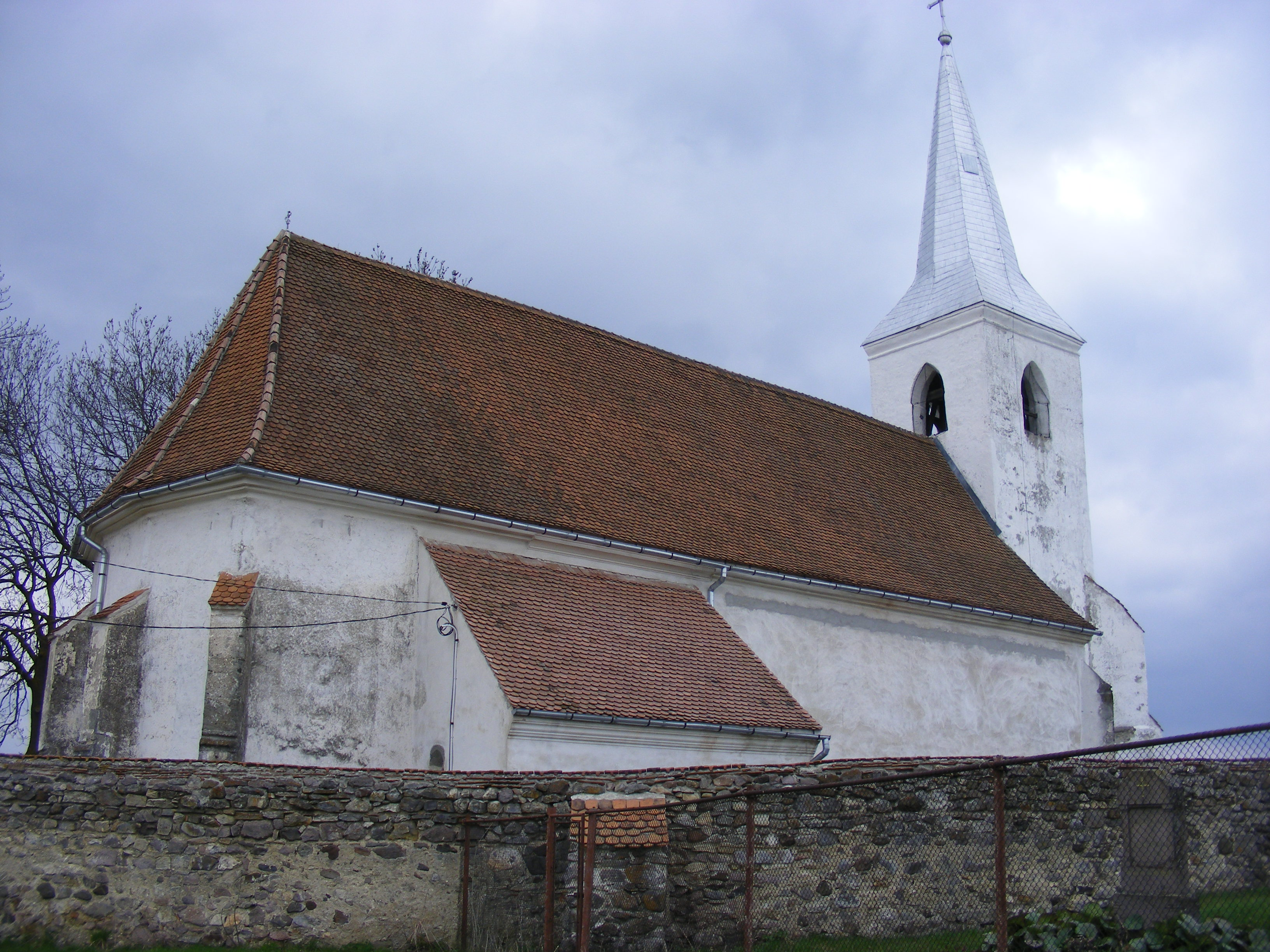
Fortified church of Delnița

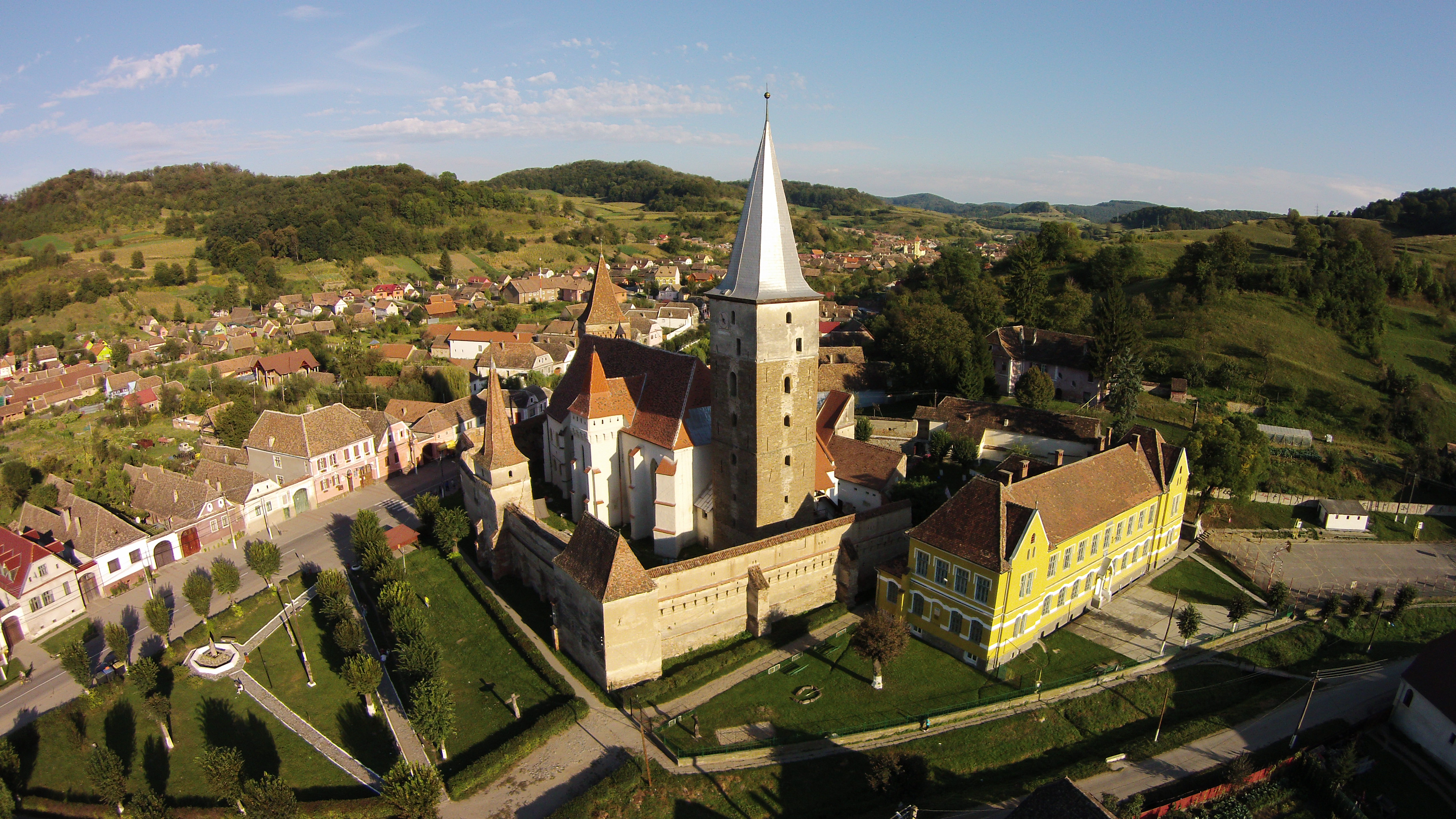
Fortified church of Moșna

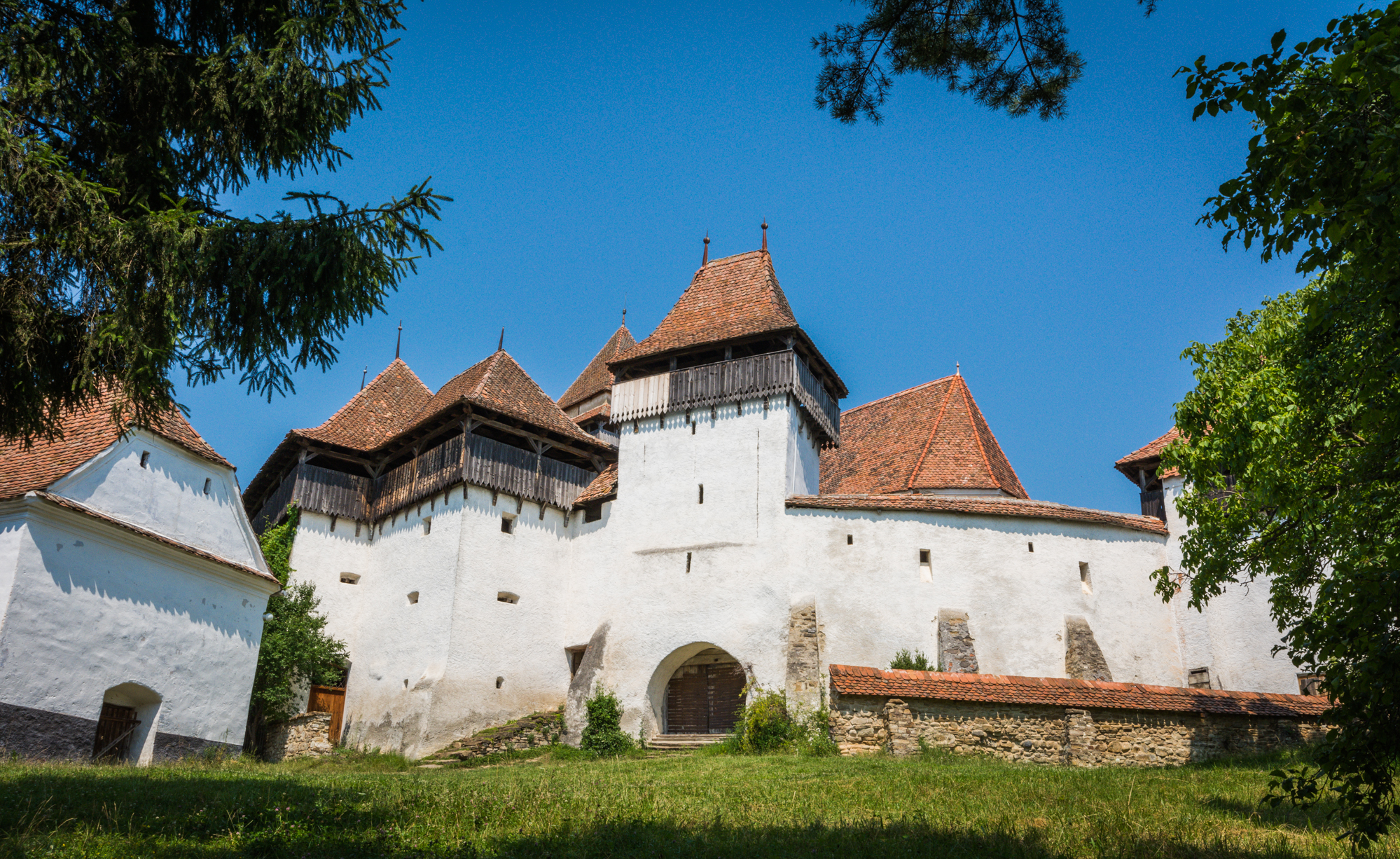
Fortified church of Viscri

== See also ==
- List of castles and fortresses in Romania
