= Șeica =

Șeica may refer to two communes in Sibiu County, Romania:

- Șeica Mare
- Șeica Mică

It is also the former name for Jeica, a village in the commune of Mărișelu in Bistrița-Năsăud County, Transylvania, Romania.
