= Șura Mică =

- Commune
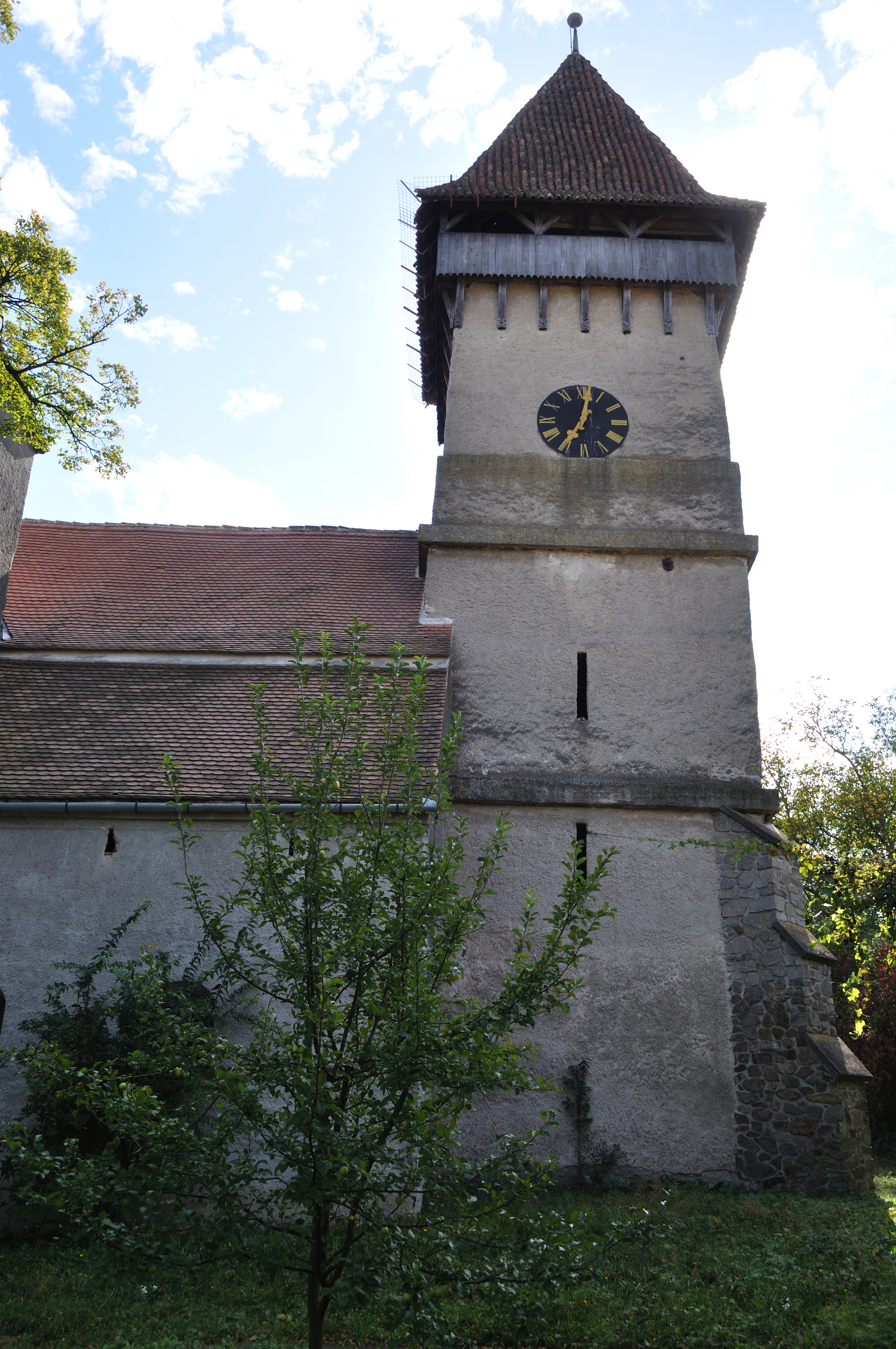
- Fortified church of Șura Mică

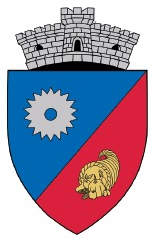
- Coat of arms

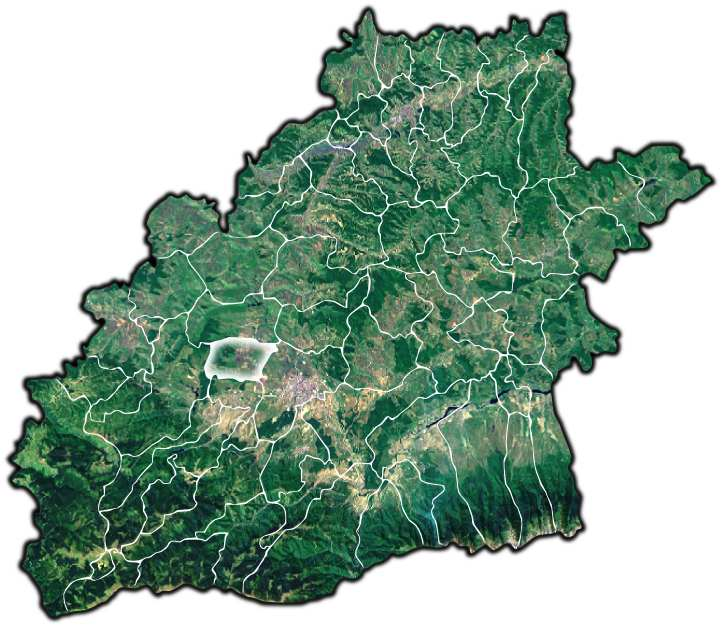
- Location in Sibiu County

- Location in Romania
- Coordinates: 45°49′55″N 24°3′27″E
- Country: Romania
- County: Sibiu

Government
  - Mayor (2020–2024): Valentin Ristea (PNL)
- Area: 49.48 km^{2} (19.10 sq mi)
- Elevation: 420 m (1,380 ft)
- Population (2021-12-01): 3,239
  - Density: 65.46/km^{2} (169.5/sq mi)
- Time zone: UTC+02:00 (EET)
  - Summer (DST): UTC+03:00 (EEST)
- Postal code: 557270
- Area code: (+40) 02 69
- Vehicle reg.: SB
- Website: comunasuramica.ro

Șura Mică (German: Kleinscheuern; Hungarian: Kiscsűr) is a commune in the central part of Sibiu County, Transylvania, Romania. The commune is located immediately to the north of the city of Sibiu. It is composed of two villages, Rusciori (Reußdörfchen; Oroszcsűr) and Șura Mică.

== Population ==
- 1525: a school
- 1786: 613 people
- 1910: 1,412 people
- 1990: 2,550 people
- 2002: 2,357 people
- 2011: 2,606 people
- 2021: 3,239 people

== History ==
The village was documented in 1323 as "Parvum Horreum" = Kleine Scheuer. The name changed to Cleynschowern around 1468.

A medieval fortified church in Șura Mică was built in the 13th century and considerably rebuilt around 1500. Only fragments of the surrounding wall survive.

The village is known for the colorful "Trachten" of the traditional Saxon population dress for women and girls. It is an agricultural centre, known for farming, livestock, hops, and fruits.
