= Cristian, Sibiu =

Cristian
- Commune
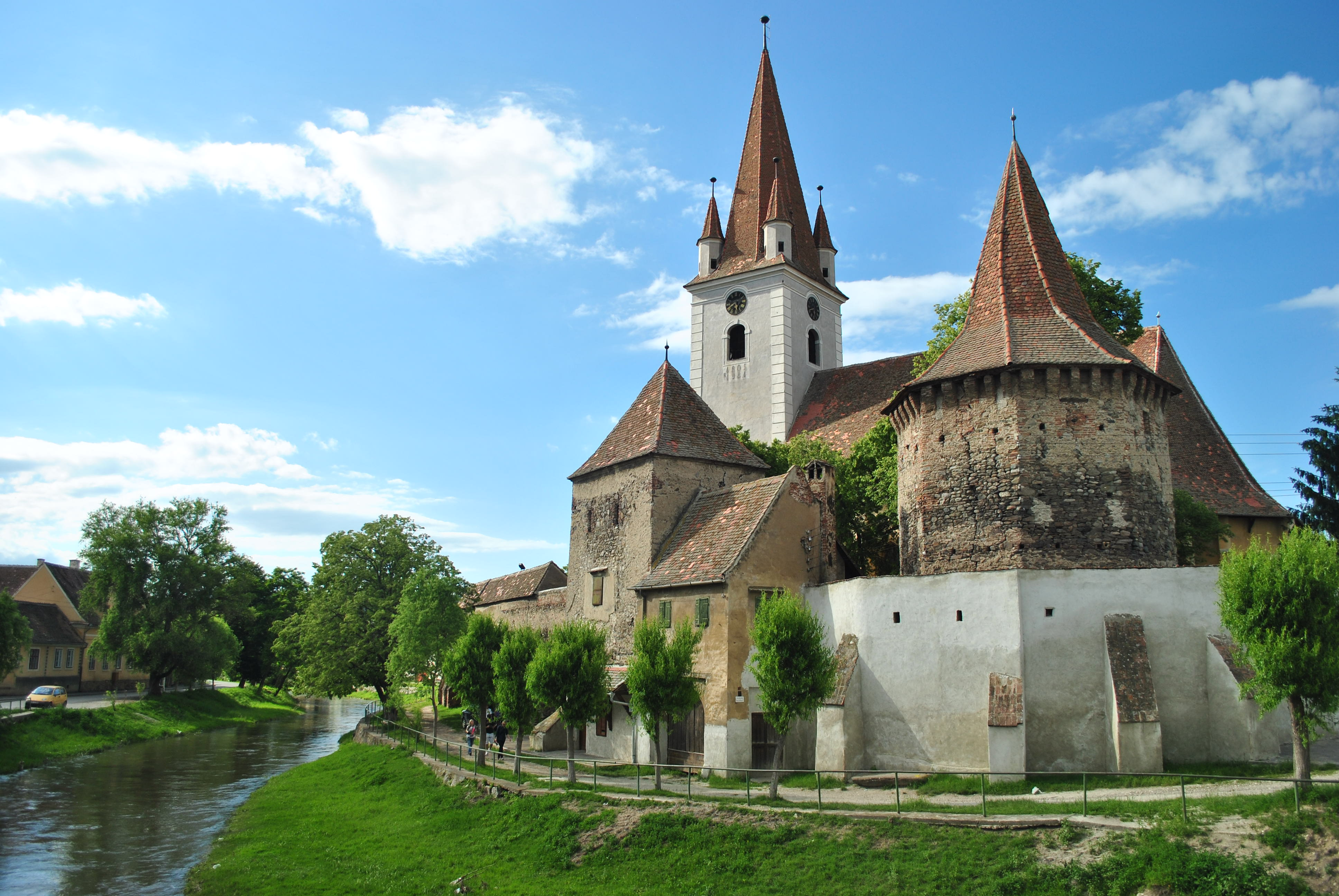
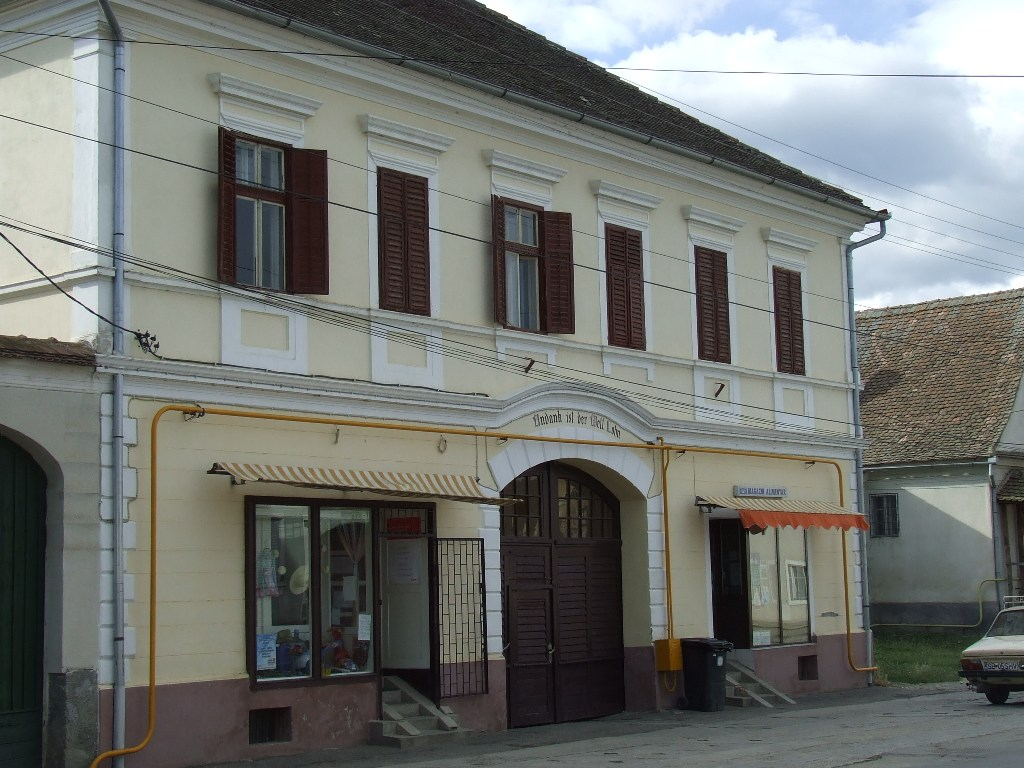
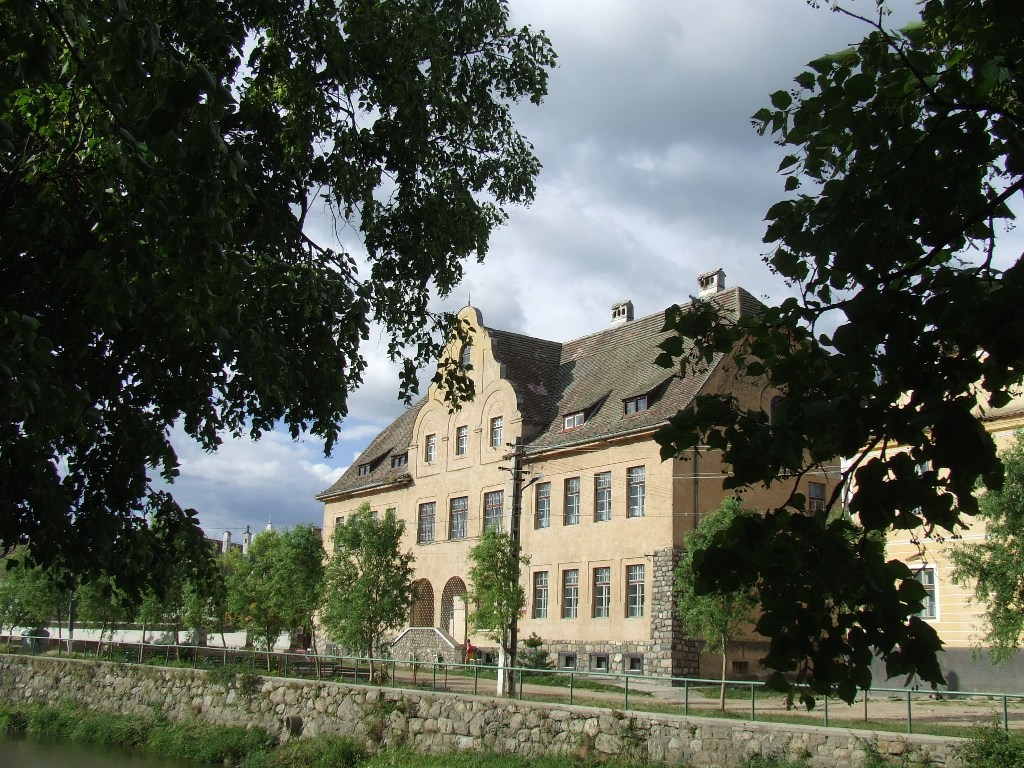
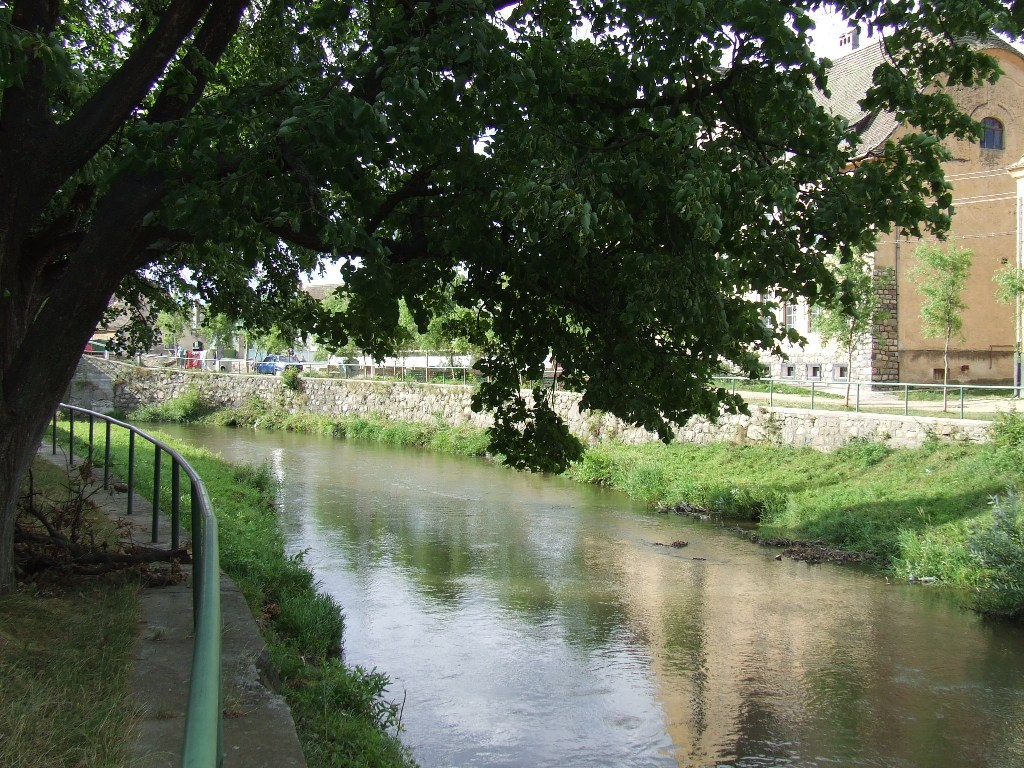
- From top, left to right: Evangelical fortified church; Building in Cristian; School in Cristian; The Cibin River

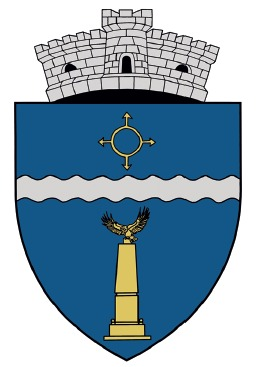
- Coat of arms

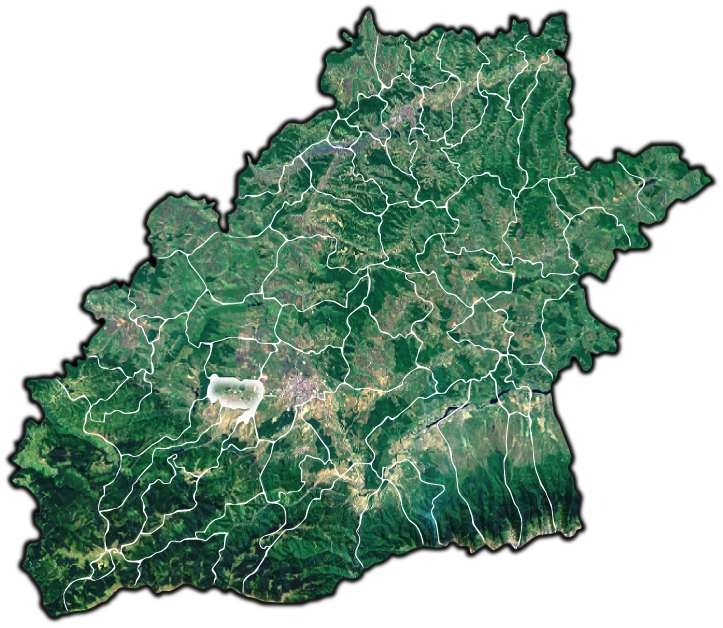
- Location in Sibiu County

- Location in Romania
- Coordinates: 45.7833°N 24.0292°E
- Country: Romania
- County: Sibiu

Government
  - Mayor (2024–2028): Claudiu Gheorghe Pâșu (PER)
- Area: 71.16 km^{2} (27.48 sq mi)
- Elevation: 444 m (1,457 ft)
- Population (2021-12-01): 4,116
  - Density: 57.84/km^{2} (149.8/sq mi)
- Time zone: UTC+02:00 (EET)
  - Summer (DST): UTC+03:00 (EEST)
- Postal code: 557085
- Area code: +(40) 0269
- Vehicle reg.: SB
- Website: comunacristian.ro

Cristian (German: Grossau; Hungarian: Kereszténysziget) is a commune located in Sibiu County, Transylvania, Romania. It is composed of a single village, Cristian, located on the Cibin. The village was founded in 1223 by German settlers.

== Culture and recreation ==
A medieval fortified church in Cristian was built in the 13th century (only the Romanesque tower survives; the main volume is from the 1490s and is in Gothic style). It is surrounded by a wall with several towers. The church was declared a historic monument, as well an Orthodox church "Buna Vestire", built in 1790. There is a museum as well.

== Gallery ==
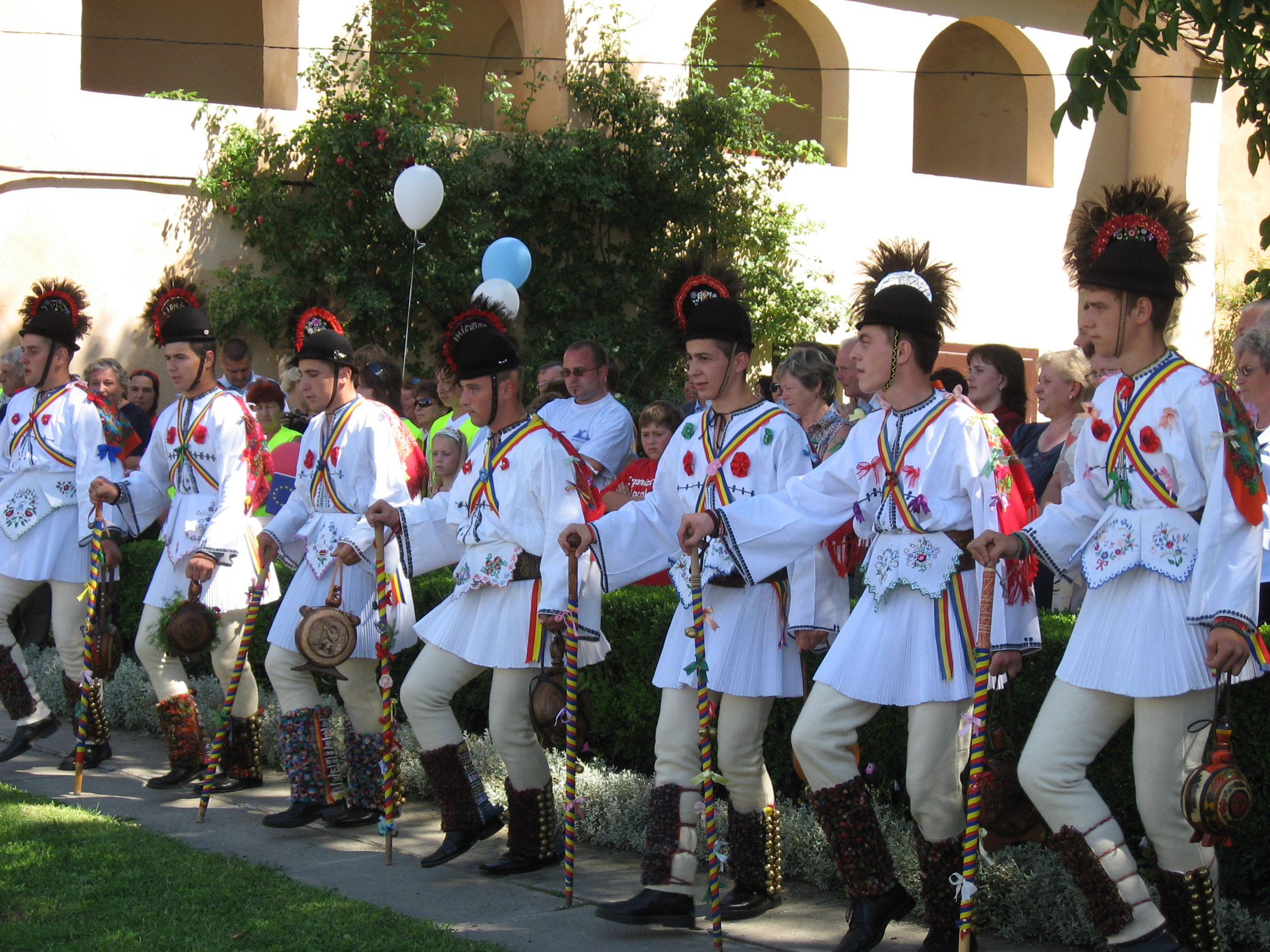
Călușari
