= Gușterița =

Coordinates: 45.8111°N 24.1778°E

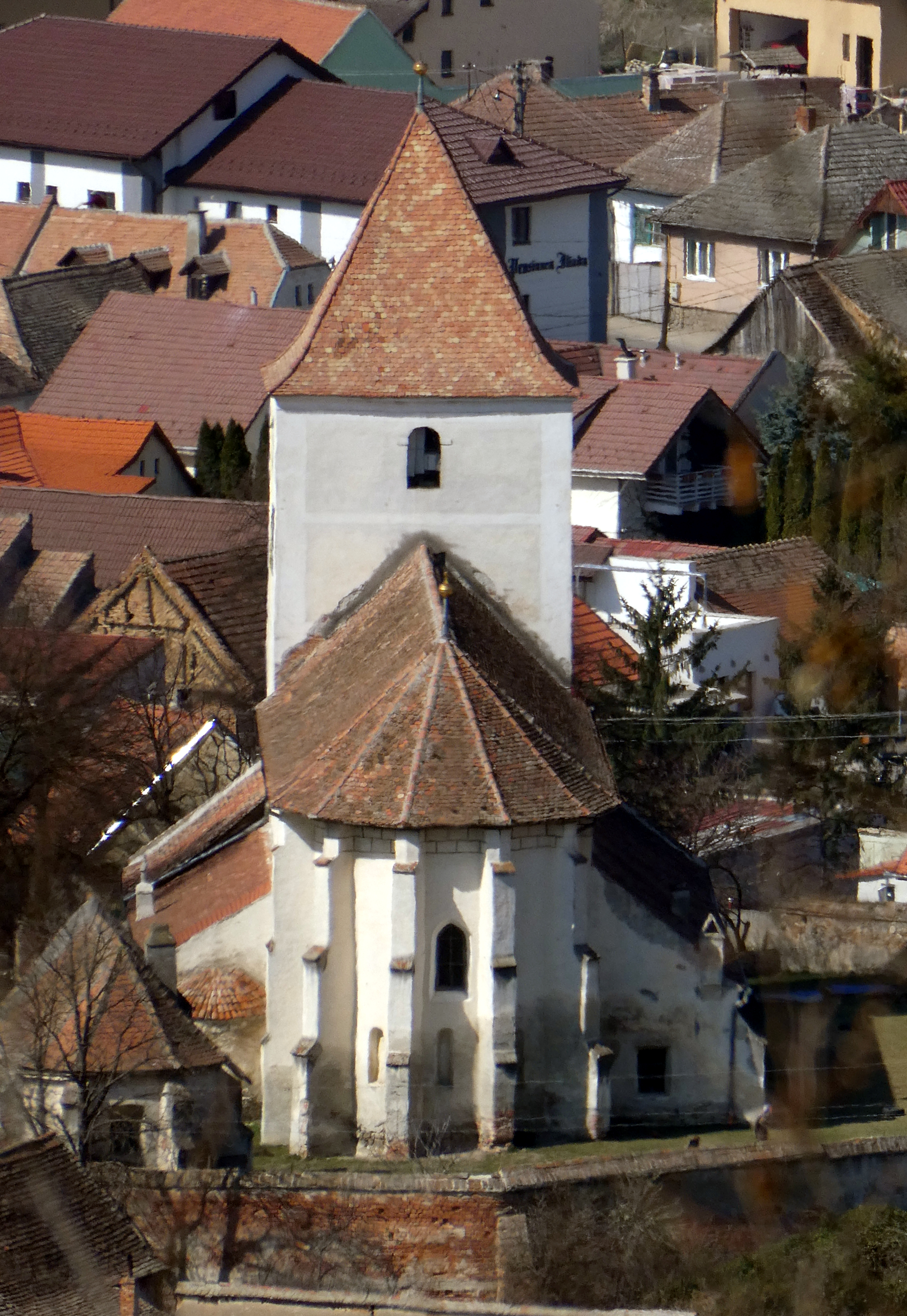
The Evangelical Lutheran fortified church of the Gușterița neighbourhood, as seen from the nearby hills of Gușterița.

Gușterița (German: Hammersdorf, Transylvanian Saxon: Hammersterf) is a district or neighbourhood of Sibiu (German: Hermannstadt), Sibiu County (German: Kreis Hermannstadt), southern Transylvania (German: Siebenbürgen), Romania.

== History ==
The region was first mentioned in 1309 as a Saxon settlement which was incorporated into the city in 1940.

This region is also believed to be the place where the Roman fort of Cedonia castra was located.

== Culture and recreation ==
A medieval fortified church in Gușterița was built during the beginning of the 13th century by the local Transylvanian Saxon community, however, only fragments of the tower and of portals survive. The main volume of the church, as well as the enclosure, was built in the Gothic style in the end of the 15th century.
