= Micăsasa =

- Commune
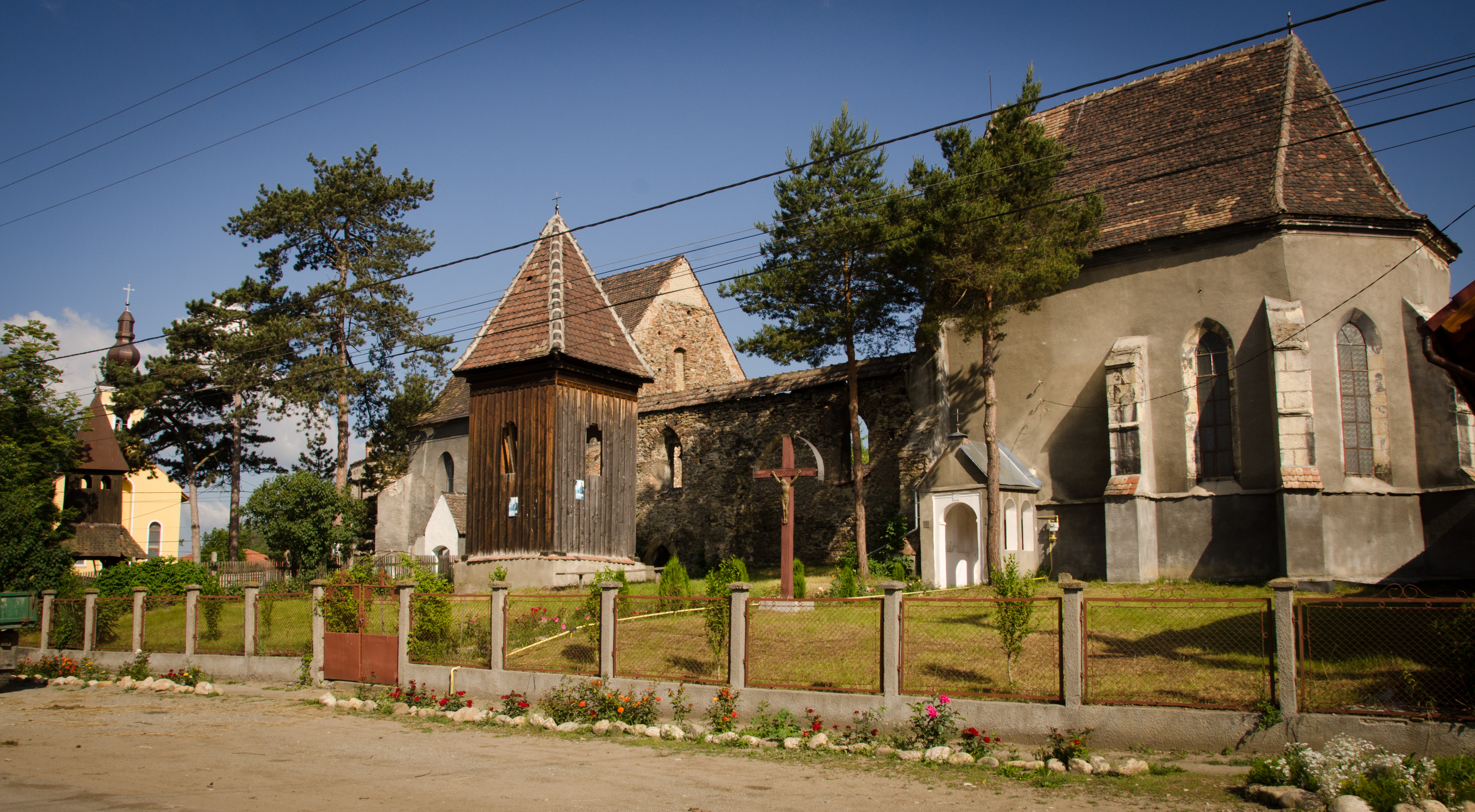
- Catholic church in Micăsasa

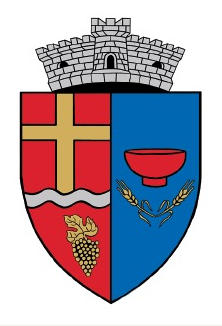
- Coat of arms

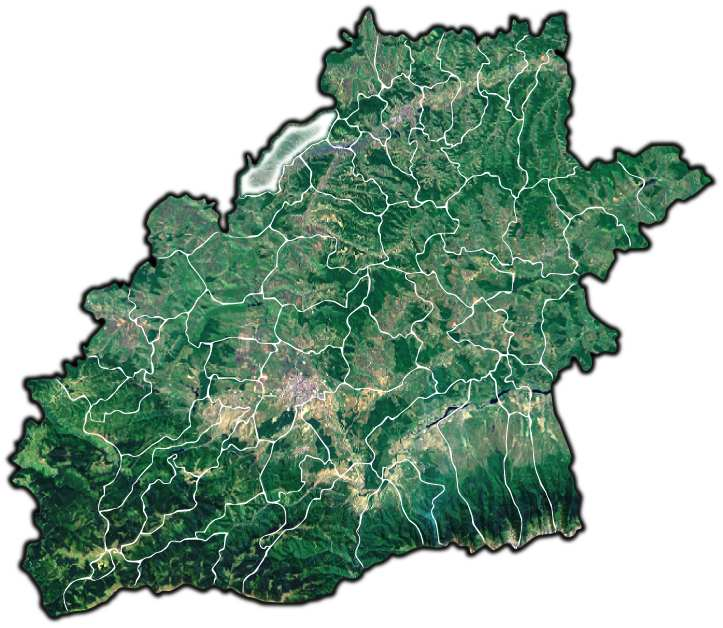
- Location in Sibiu County

- Location in Romania
- Coordinates: 46°5′N 24°7′E
- Country: Romania
- County: Sibiu

Government
  - Mayor (2020–2024): Timotei Păcurar (USR)
- Area: 71.38 km^{2} (27.56 sq mi)
- Elevation: 284 m (932 ft)
- Population (2021-12-01): 1,698
  - Density: 23.79/km^{2} (61.61/sq mi)
- Time zone: UTC+02:00 (EET)
  - Summer (DST): UTC+03:00 (EEST)
- Postal code: 557145
- Area code: +(40) x59
- Vehicle reg.: SB
- Website: primaria-micasasa.ro

Micăsasa (German: Feigendorf; Hungarian: Mikeszásza) is a commune located in Sibiu County, Transylvania, Romania. It is composed of four villages: Chesler (Kesseln; Keszlér), Micăsasa, Țapu (Abtsdorf an der Kokel; Csicsóholdvilág), and Văleni (Huruba). Micăsasa and Țapu villages have fortified churches.

The commune is situated on the Transylvanian Plateau, at an altitude of 284 m (932 ft), on the banks of the river Târnava Mare. It is located in the northwestern part of Sibiu County, 14 km (8.7 mi) west of the town of Copșa Mică and 40 km (25 mi) north of the county seat, Sibiu, on the border with Alba County.

Micăsasa is crossed by national road DN14B, which branches off DN14B in Copșa Mică and merges into DN1 in Teiuș, 42 km (26 mi) to the west. The Micăsasa train station serves the CFR Main Line 300, which connects Bucharest with the Hungarian border near Oradea. The route of the Via Transilvanica long-distance trail passes through the village of Micăsasa.

At the 2011 census, the commune had 2,058 inhabitants; of those, 93.4% were Romanians, 4.4% Hungarians, 1.5% Roma, and 0.6% Germans. At the 2021 census, the population had decreased to 1,698, of which 87.28% were Romanians and 1% Hungarians.

== Gallery ==
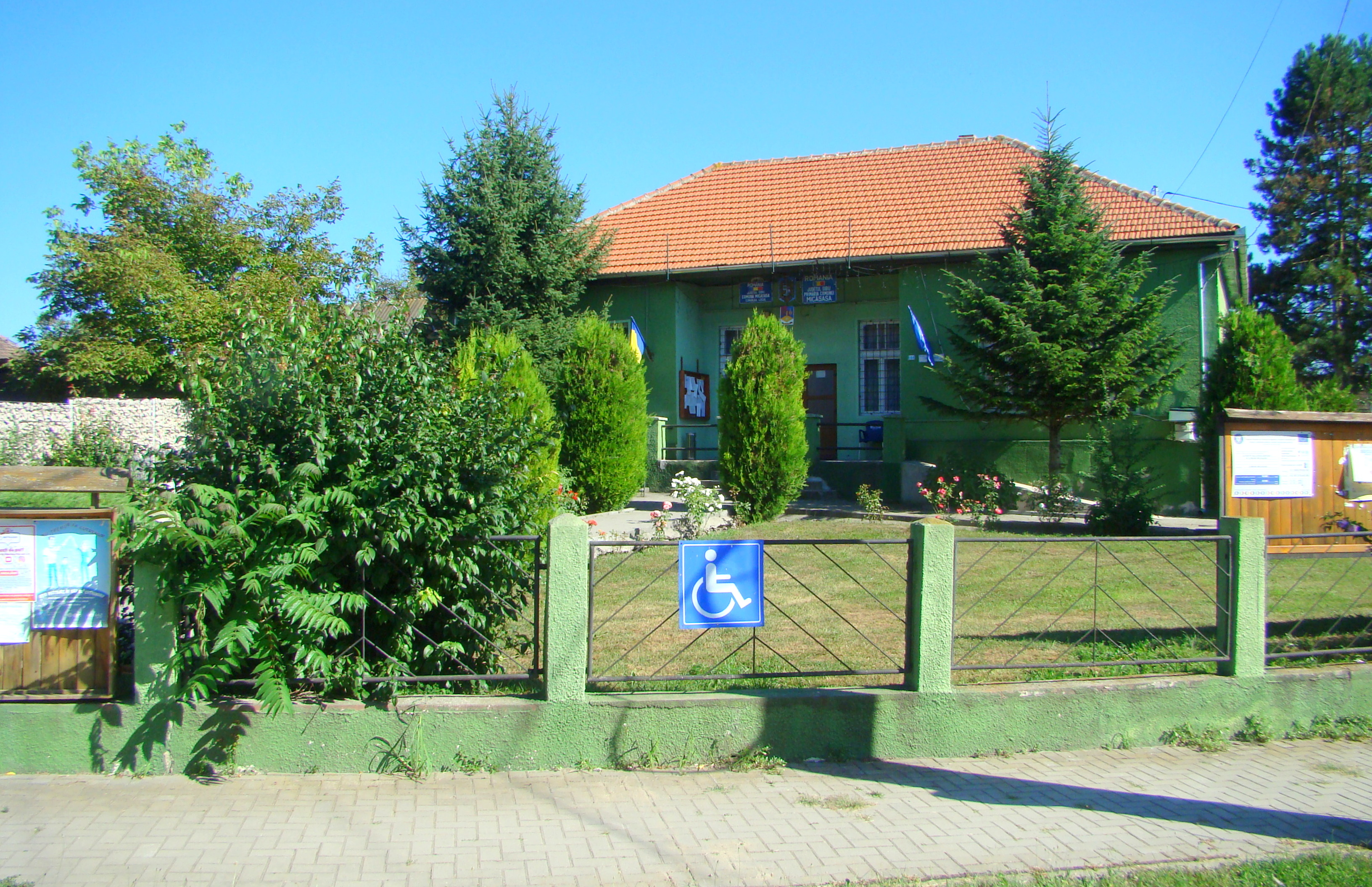
Town hall of Micăsasa

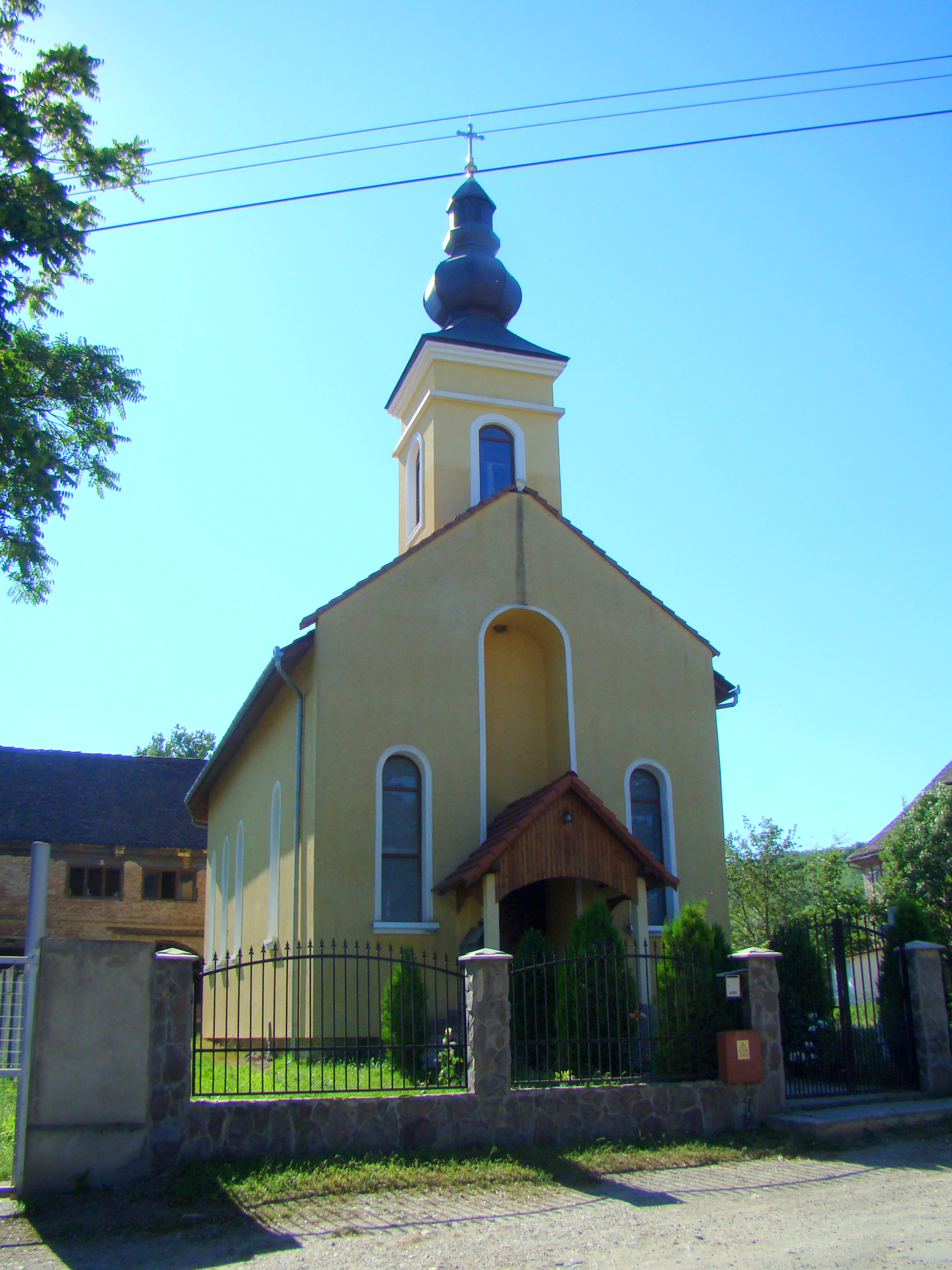
Greek Catholic Church

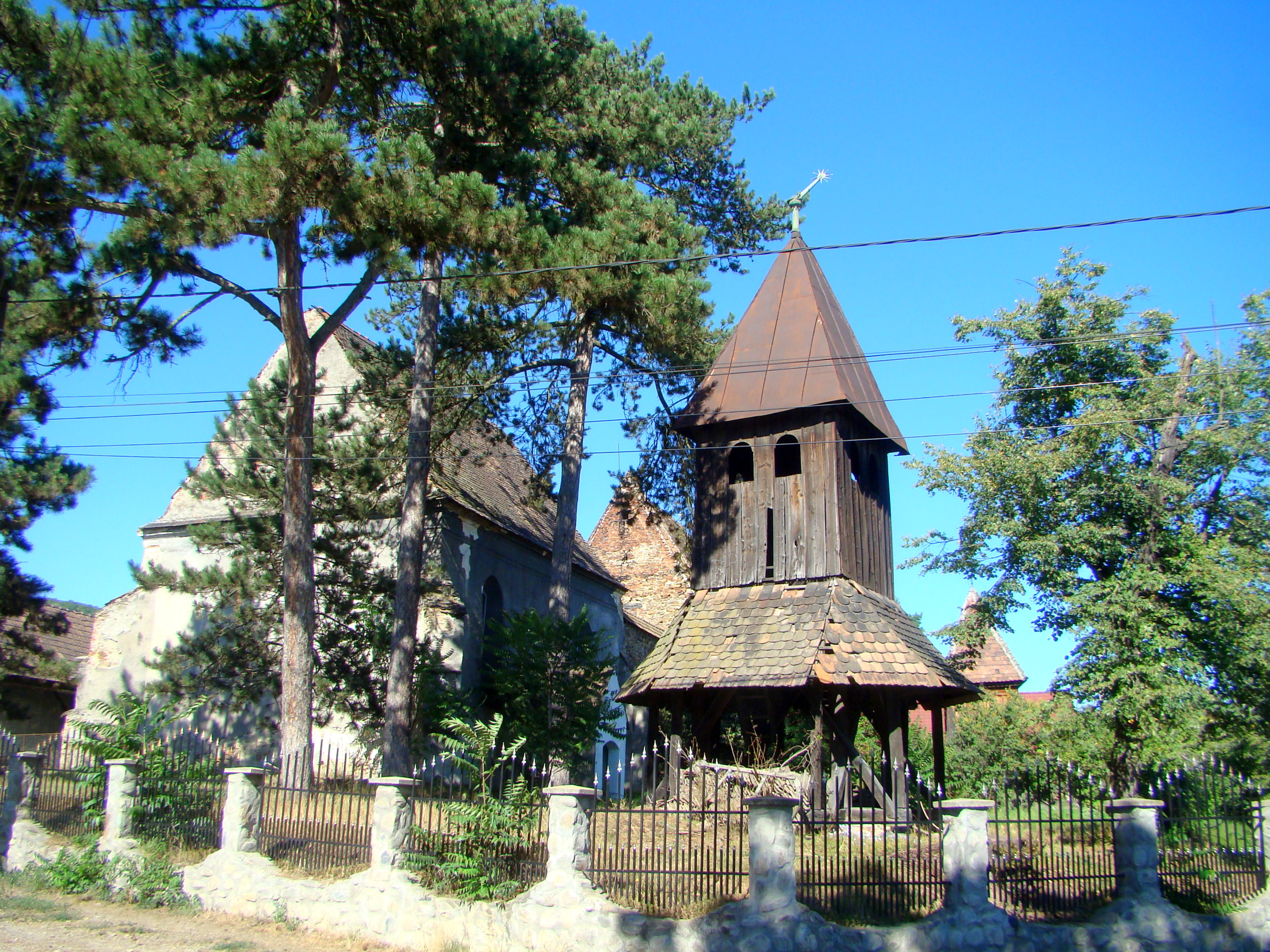
Reformed church

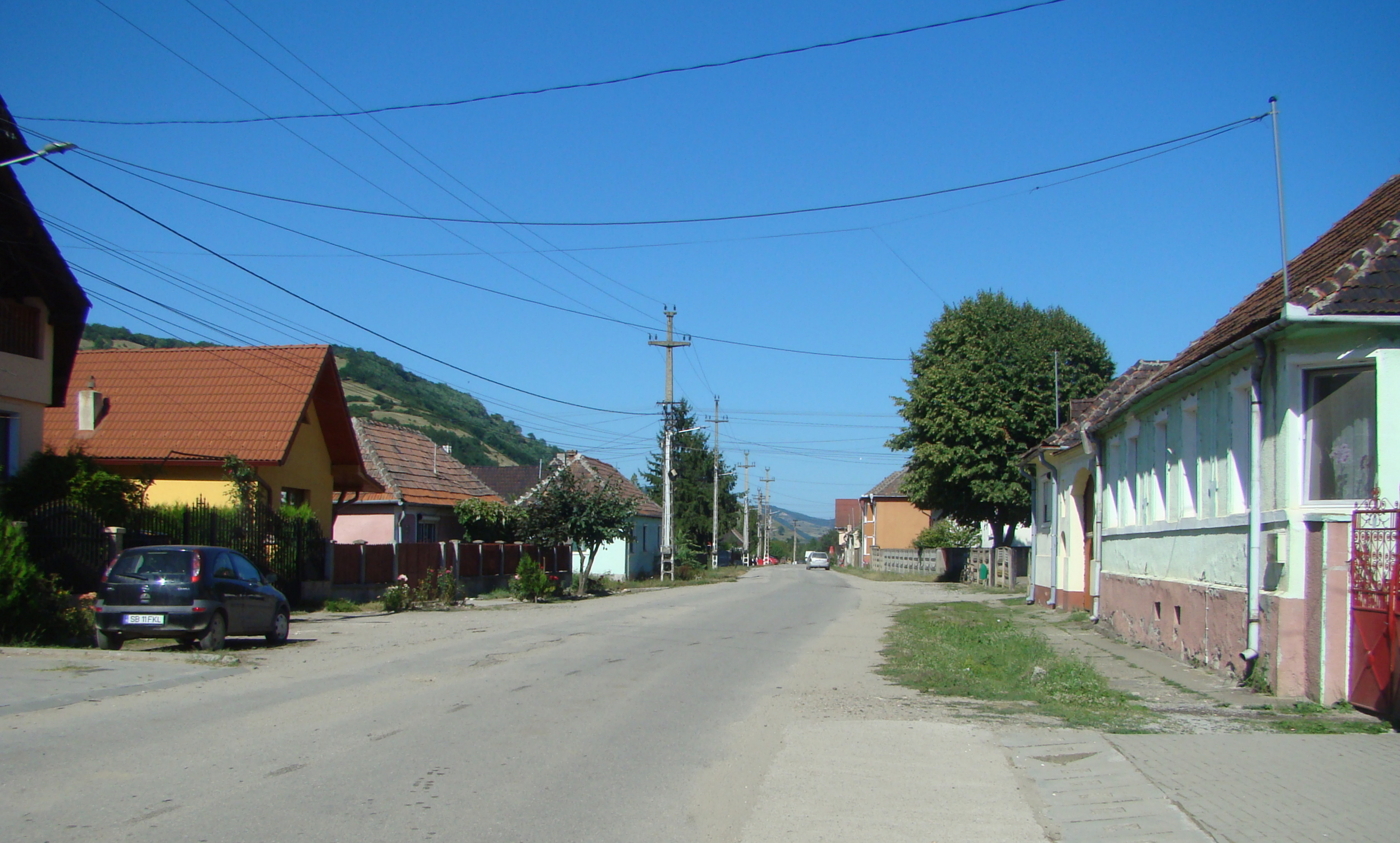
Main Street of Micăsasa

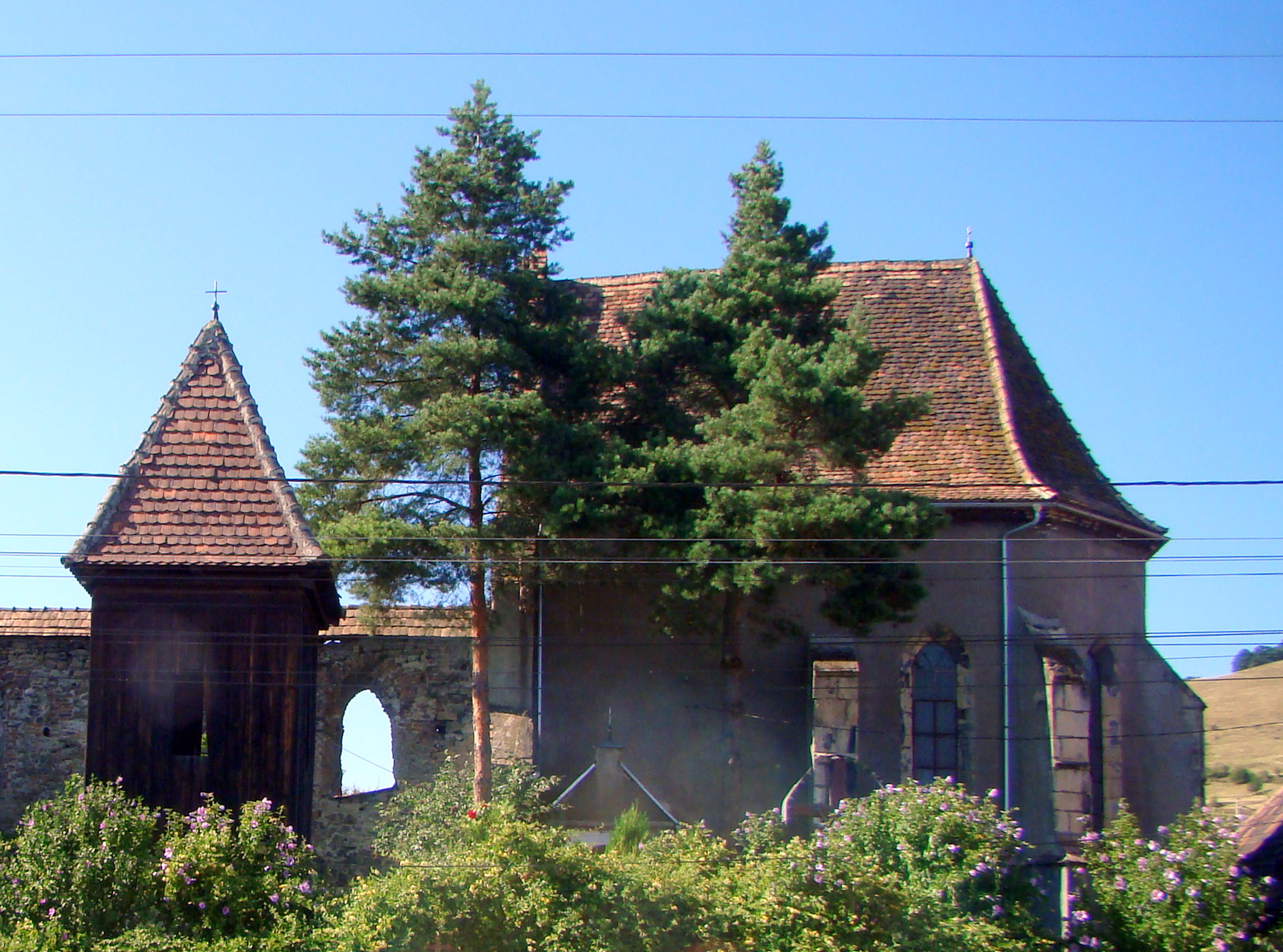
Roman Catholic church „The holy trio”

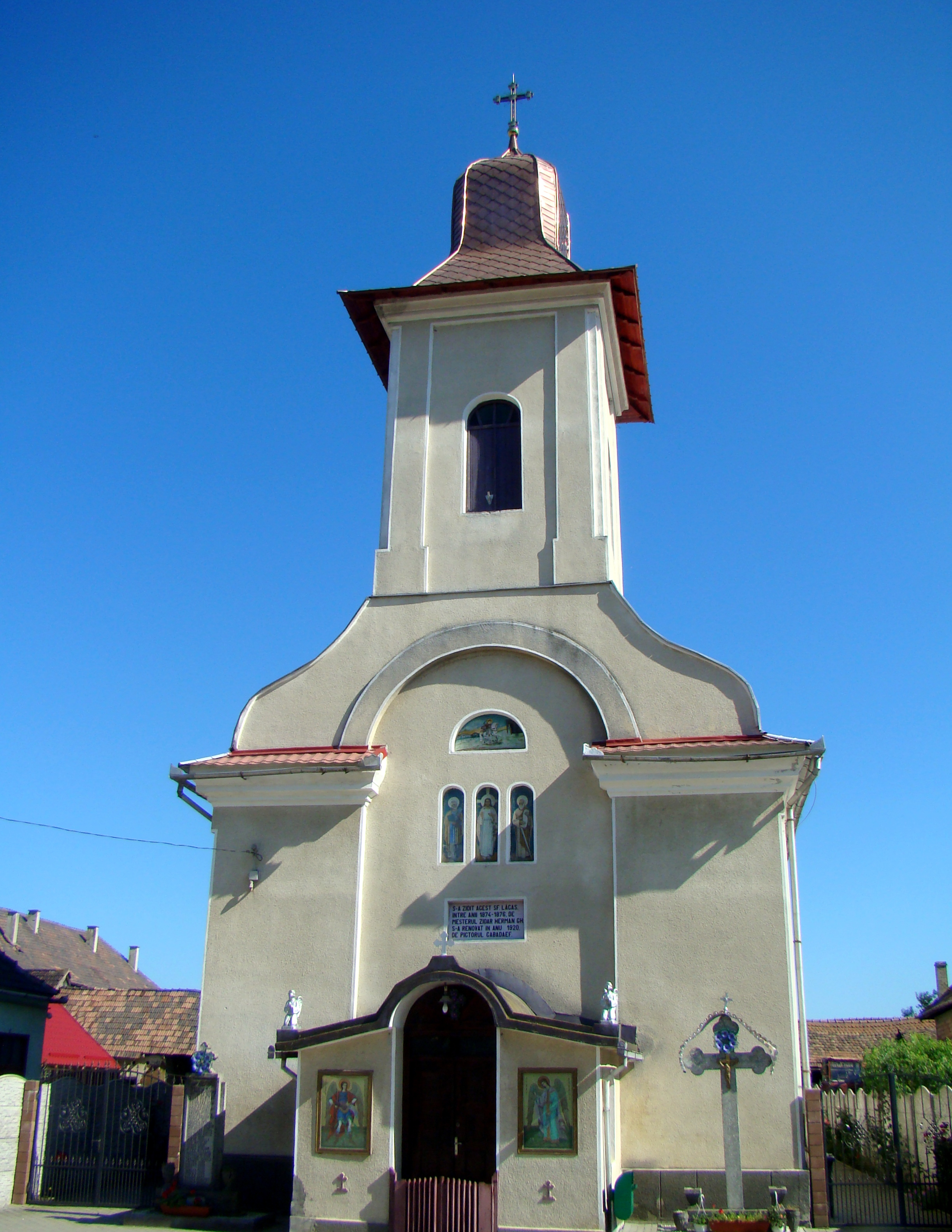
Orthodox church

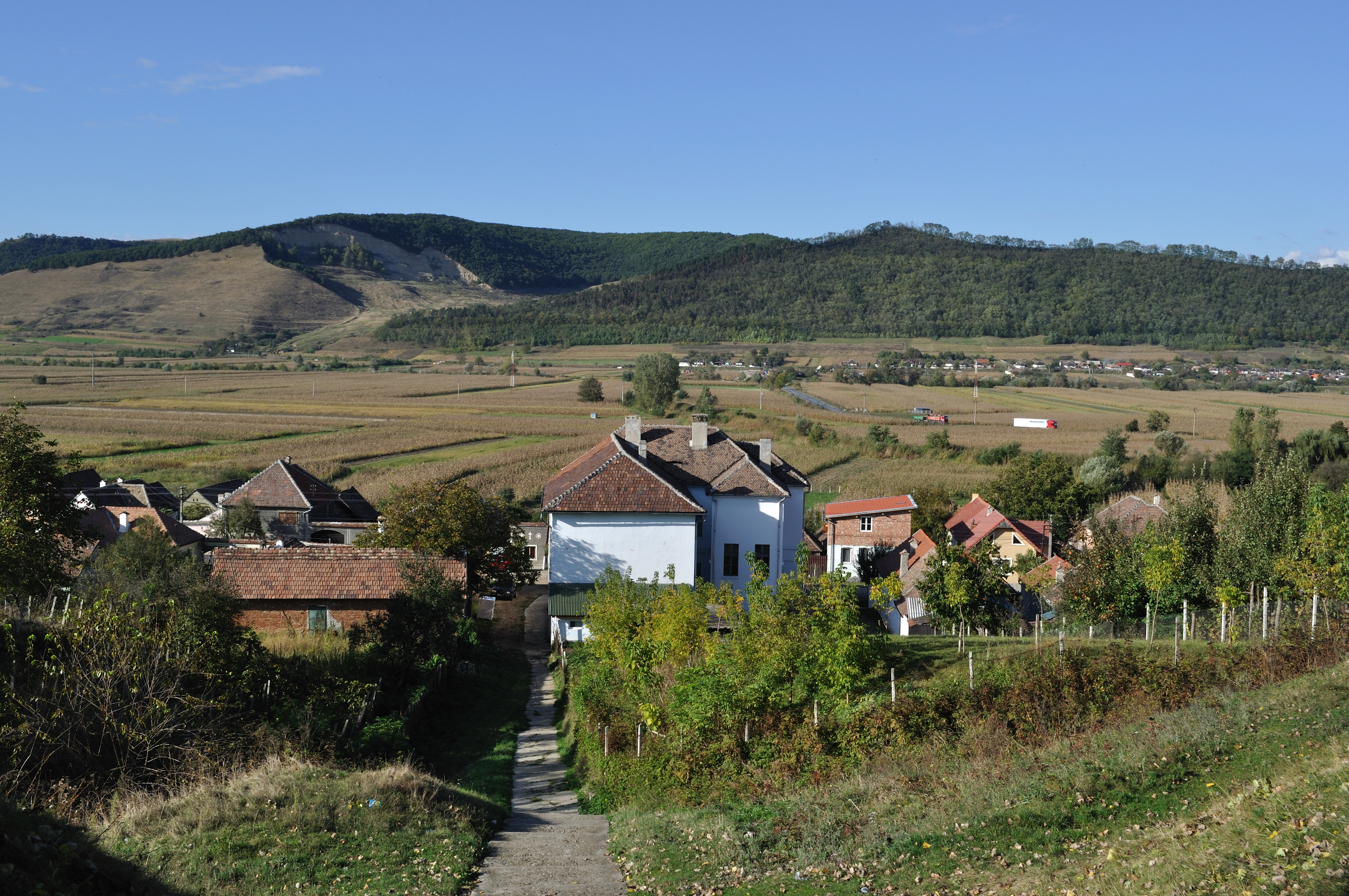
Țapu

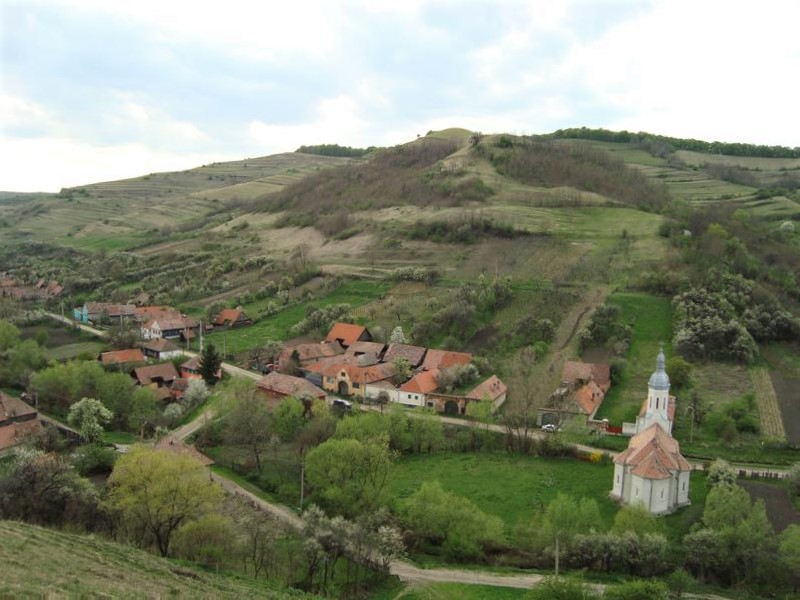
Chesler

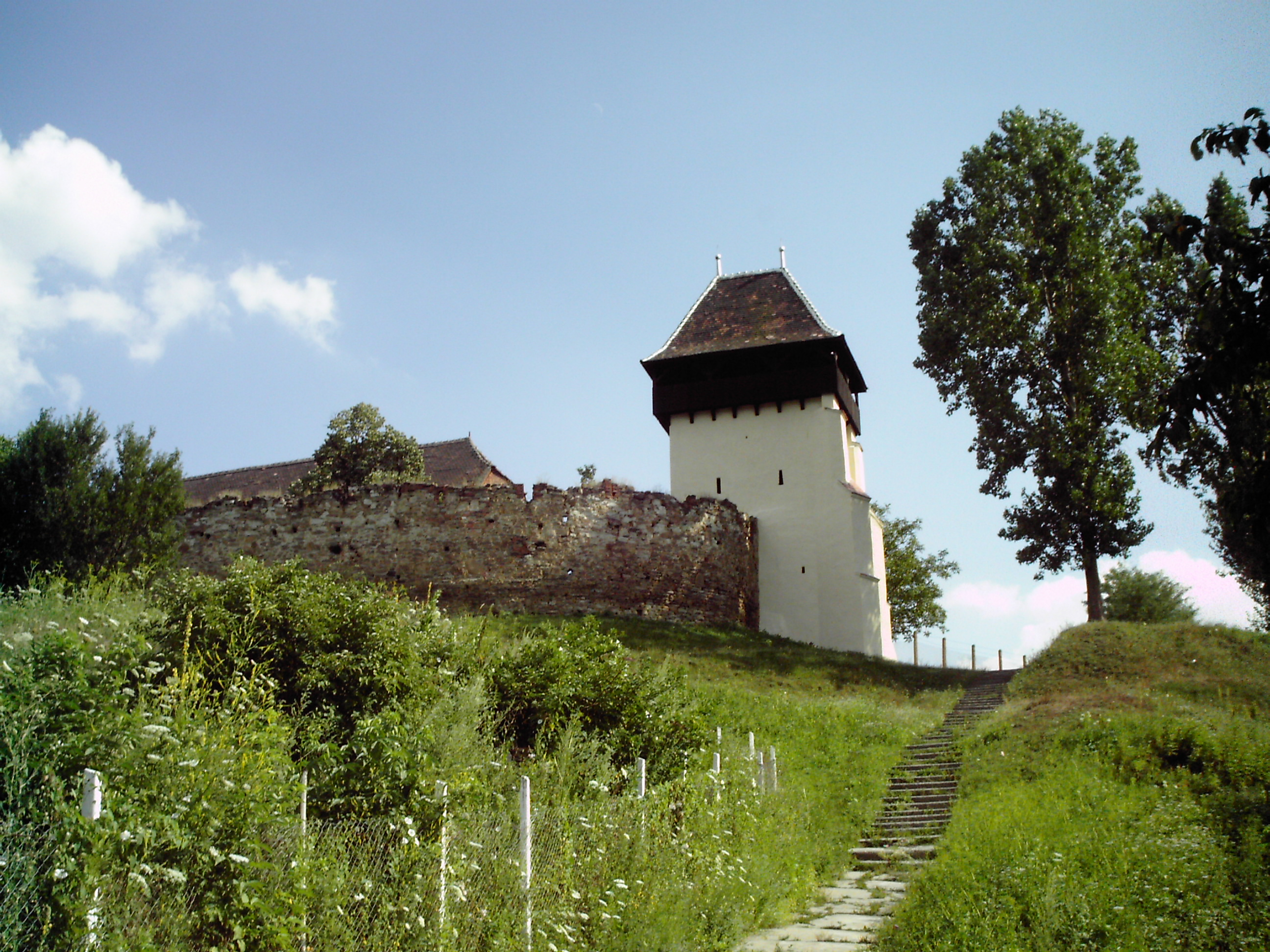
Fortified church of Țapu

== See also ==
- List of fortified churches in Transylvania
- Villages with fortified churches in Transylvania
