= Iacobeni, Sibiu =

Iacobeni
- Commune
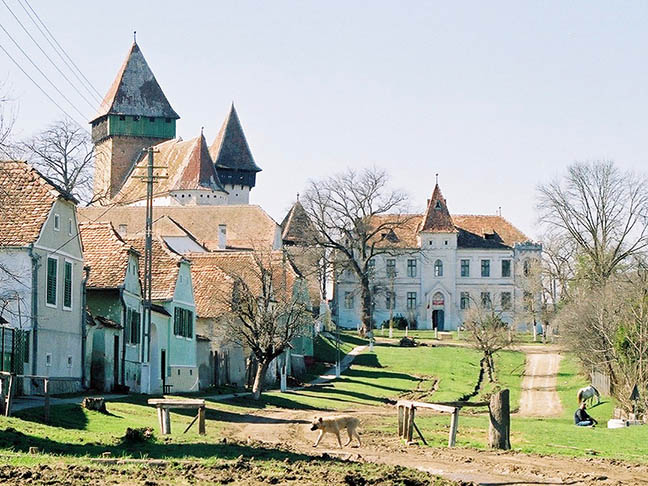
- Iacobeni (Jakobsdorf)

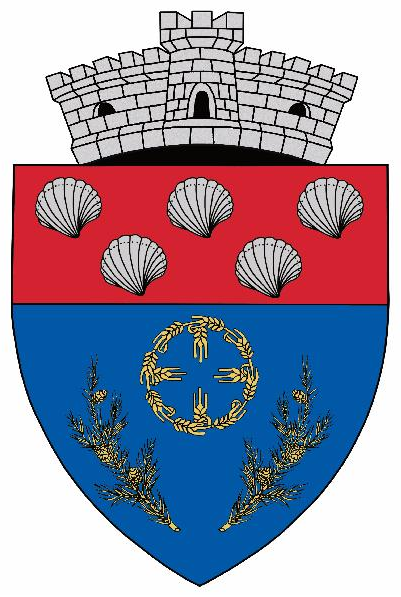
- Coat of arms

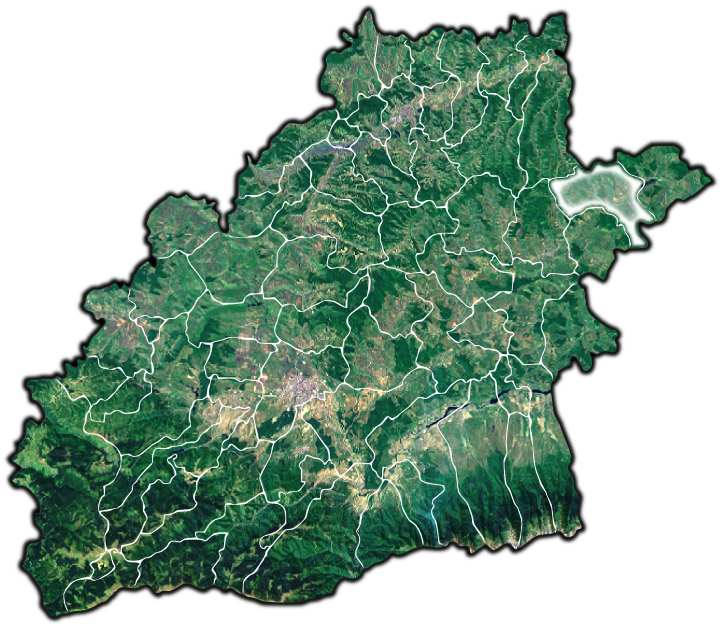
- Location in Sibiu County

- Location in Romania
- Coordinates: 46°3′N 24°43′E
- Country: Romania
- County: Sibiu

Government
  - Mayor (2020–2024): Ioan Maca (PSD)
- Area: 103.45 km^{2} (39.94 sq mi)
- Elevation: 480 m (1,570 ft)
- Population (2021-12-01): 2,780
  - Density: 26.9/km^{2} (69.6/sq mi)
- Time zone: UTC+02:00 (EET)
  - Summer (DST): UTC+03:00 (EEST)
- Postal code: 557105
- Area code: (+40) 02 69
- Vehicle reg.: SB
- Website: comuna-iacobeni.ro/primaria

Iacobeni (German: Jakobsdorf; Hungarian: Jakabfalva) is a commune located in Sibiu County, Transylvania, Romania.

At the 1930 census, 59% of inhabitants were Germans (more specifically Transylvanian Saxons), 40.1% Romanians, and 0.9% Hungarians. At the 2011 census, Iacobeni had a population of 2,757; of those, 60.2% were Romanians, 35.8% Roma, and 1.3% Germans. At the 2021 census, the commune had a population of 2,780; of those, 59.5% were Romanians and 30.79% Roma.

== Villages ==
The commune is composed of five villages: Iacobeni, Movile (formerly Hundrubechiu), Netuș, Noiștat, and Stejărișu (formerly Proștea). Each of them has a fortified church.

In Romanian	In German	In Hungarian
Iacobeni	Jakobsdorf	Jakabfalva
Movile	Hundertbücheln	Százhalom
Netuș	Neithausen	Netus
Noiștat	Neustadt	Újváros
Stejărișu	Probstdorf	Prépostfalva

=== Movile ===
Movile is a village noted for its medieval fortifications constructed by German immigrants at the behest of the Hungarian King in the 12th and 13th centuries.

In 1910 the population was 247 Saxons. Movile was part of Austria-Hungary until 1918, when it was transferred to Romania. By 1992, all of the Germans had left and the population was made up of 347 ethnic Romanians.

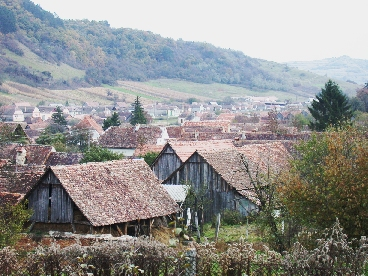
Overview of Iacobeni

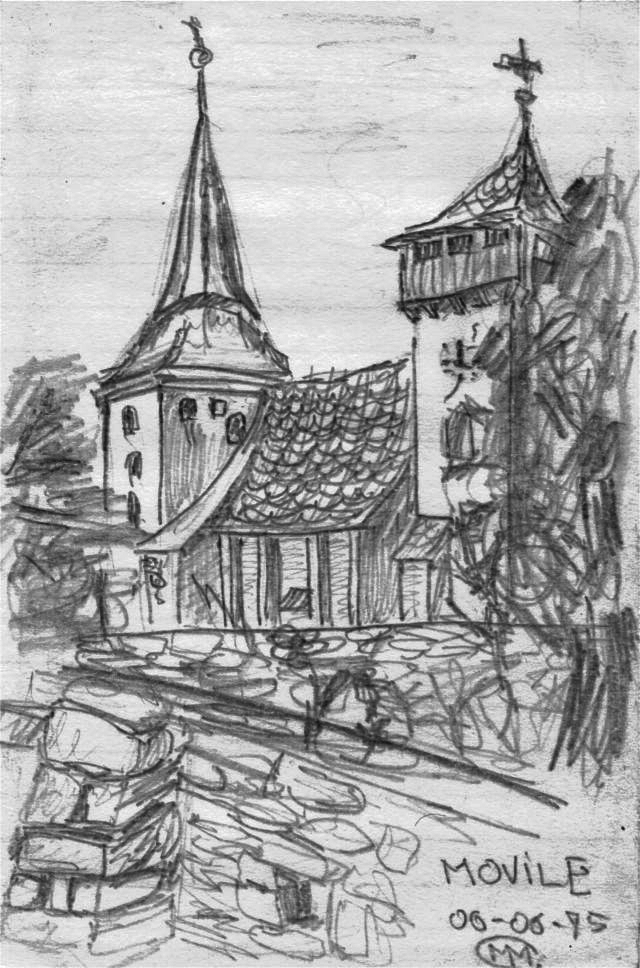
St. Michael's Church in Movile

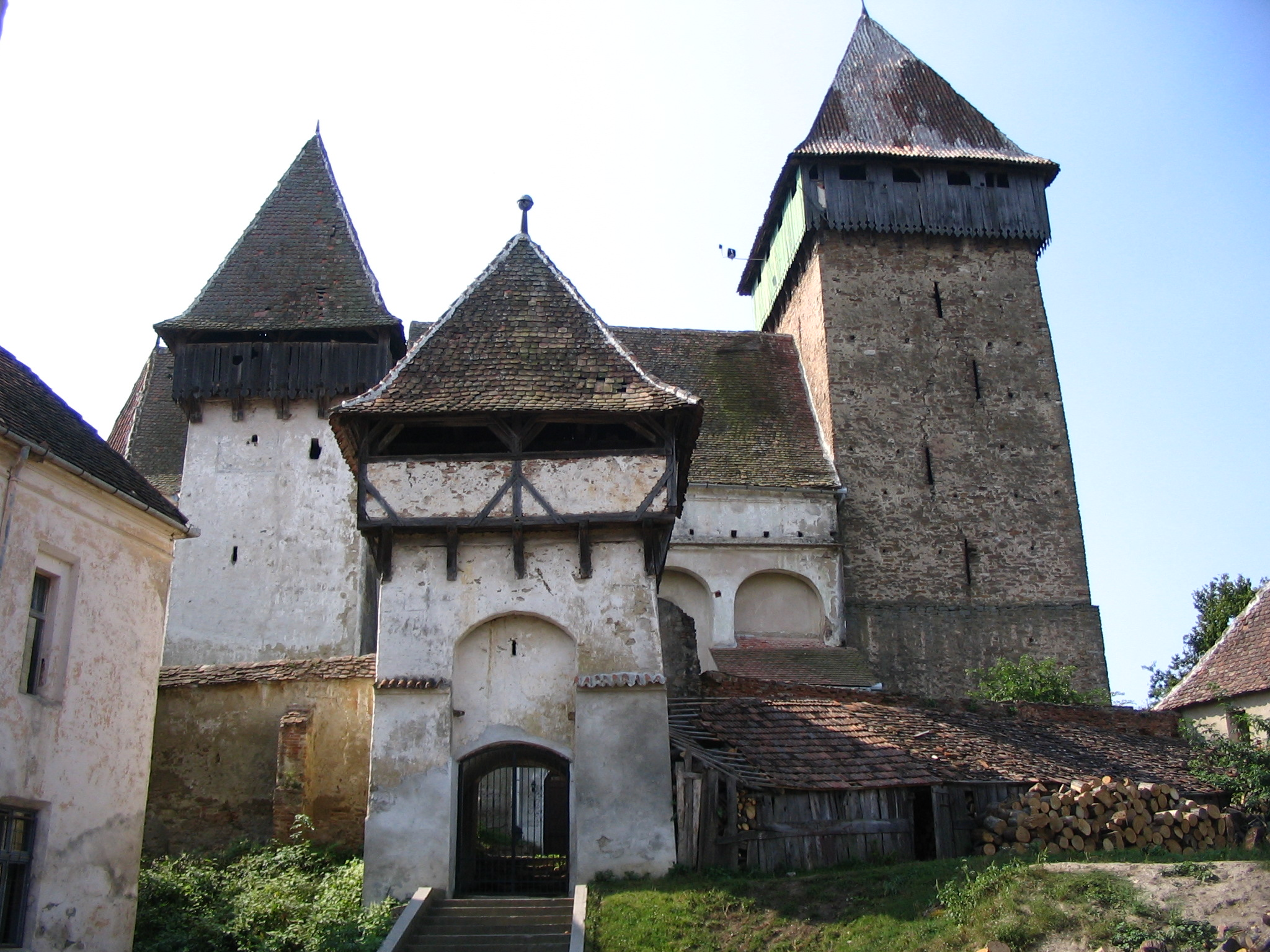
Fortified church of Iacobeni village

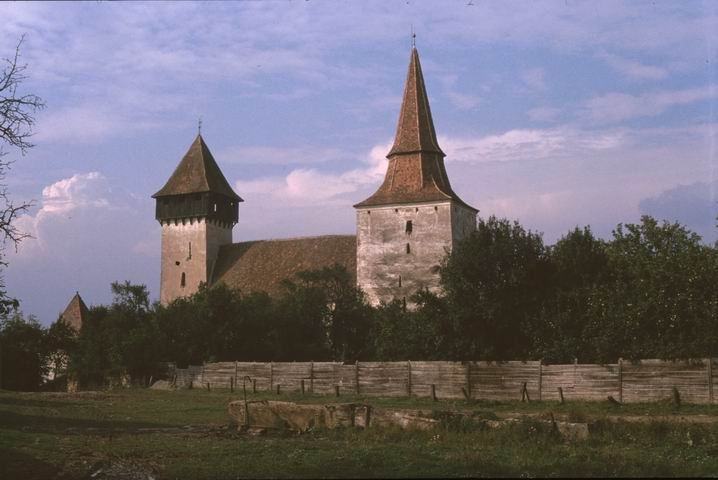
Fortified church of Movile

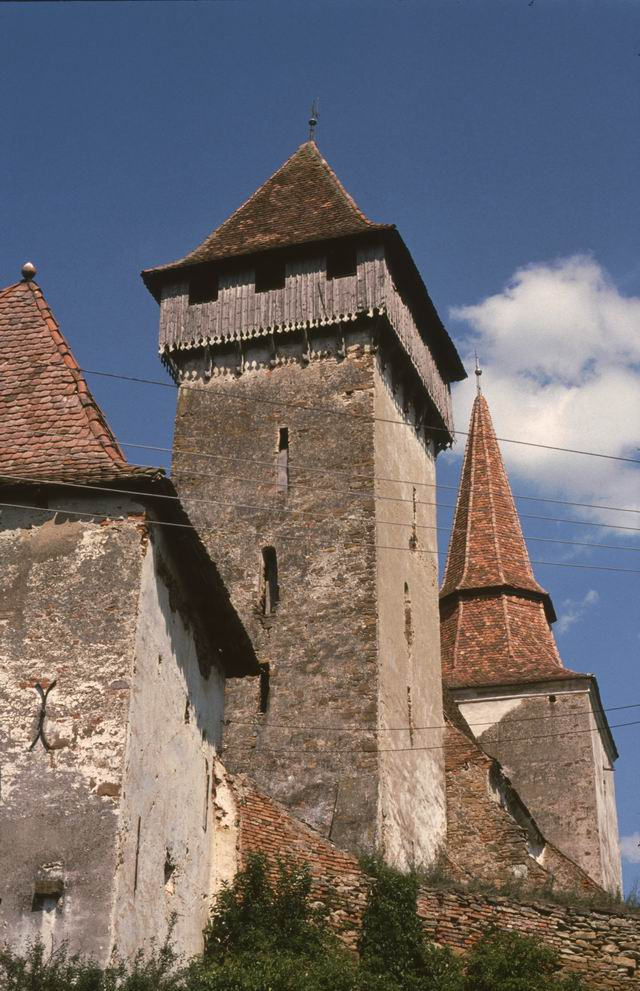
Fortified church of Movile

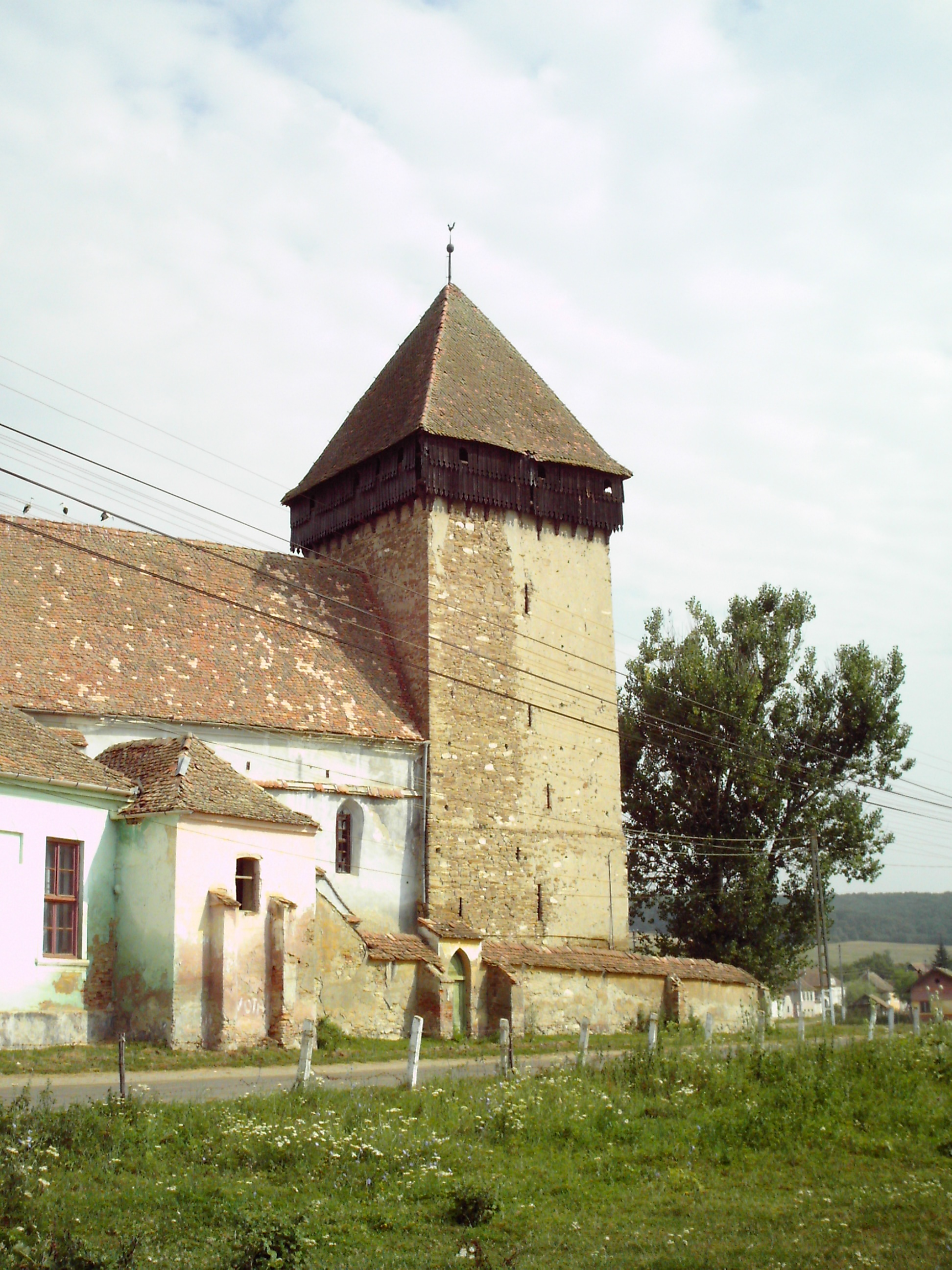
Fortified church of Netuș village
