= Merghindeal =

- Commune
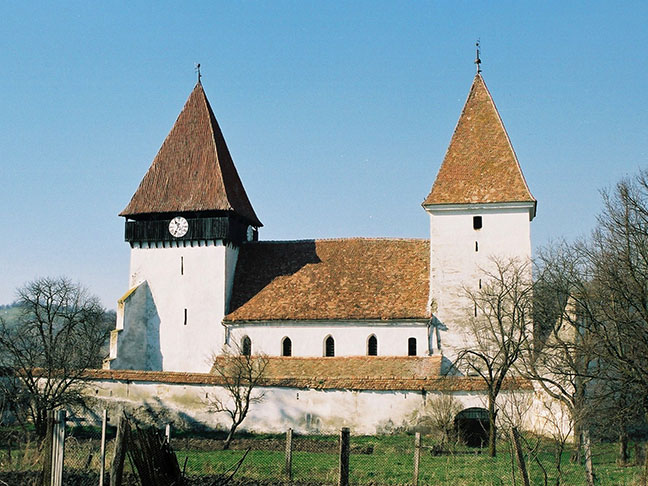
- Fortified church of Merghindeal village

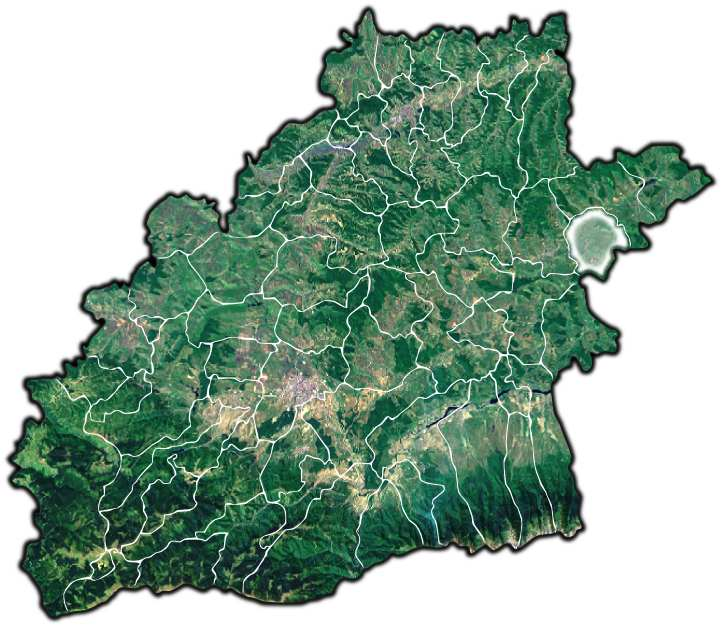
- Location in Sibiu County

- Location in Romania
- Coordinates: 45°58′N 24°44′E
- Country: Romania
- County: Sibiu

Government
  - Mayor (2024–2028): Aurel Ioan Țerbea (PSD)
- Area: 64.91 km^{2} (25.06 sq mi)
- Elevation: 484 m (1,588 ft)
- Population (2021-12-01): 1,502
  - Density: 23.14/km^{2} (59.93/sq mi)
- Time zone: UTC+02:00 (EET)
  - Summer (DST): UTC+03:00 (EEST)
- Postal code: 557140
- Area code: +(40) 0269
- Vehicle reg.: SB
- Website: primariamerghindeal.ro

Merghindeal (German: Mergeln; Hungarian: Morgonda) is a commune located in Sibiu County, Transylvania, Romania. It is composed of two villages, Dealu Frumos (formerly Șulumberg; Schönberg; Lesses) and Merghindeal. Each of these has a fortified church.

The commune lies at the southern edge of the Transylvanian Plateau. It is located in the eastern part of the county, on the border with Brașov County, 8 km (5.0 mi) from the town of Agnita and 58 km (36 mi) from the county seat, Sibiu; the city of Făgăraș is 33 km (21 mi) to the southeast.

At the 2011 census, the commune had 1,212 inhabitants; of those, 75.91% were Romanians, 16.34% Roma, 2.15% Hungarians, and 1.32% Germans (more specifically Transylvanian Saxons). At the 2021 census, Merghindeal had a population of 1,502; of those, 85.49% were Romanians, 7.59% Germans, and 1.33% Hungarians.
