= Șeica Mică =

- Commune
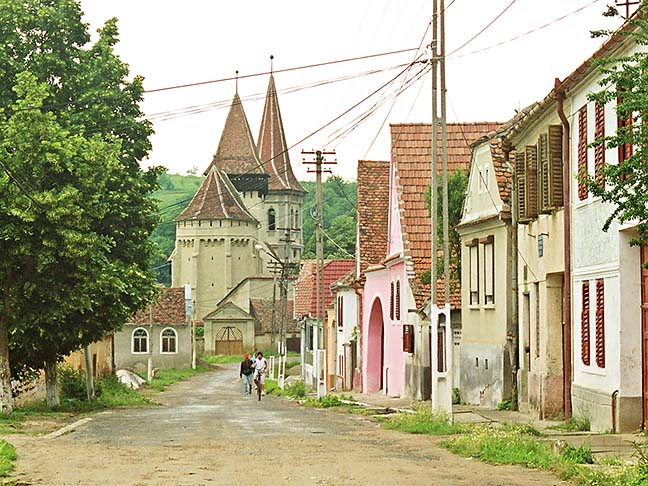
- Street in Șeica Mică with view of the Saxon fortified church.

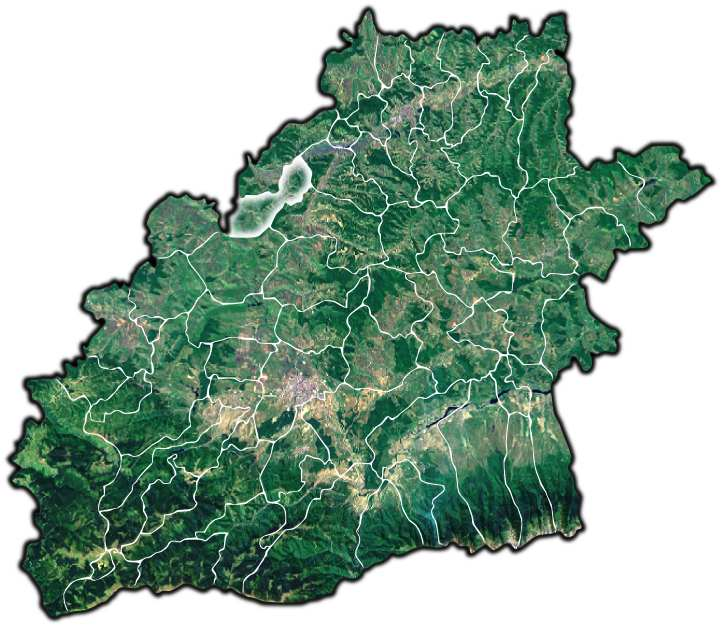
- Location in Sibiu County

- Location in Romania
- Coordinates: 46°3′N 24°8′E
- Country: Romania
- County: Sibiu

Government
  - Mayor (2024–2028): Emil Marius Urian (PNL)
- Area: 39.86 km^{2} (15.39 sq mi)
- Elevation: 299 m (981 ft)
- Population (2021-12-01): 1,519
  - Density: 38.11/km^{2} (98.70/sq mi)
- Time zone: UTC+02:00 (EET)
  - Summer (DST): UTC+03:00 (EEST)
- Postal code: 557255
- Area code: +(40) 0269
- Vehicle reg.: SB
- Website: seicamica.ro

Șeica Mică (German: Kleinschelken; Hungarian: Kisselyk) is a commune located in Sibiu County, Transylvania, Romania. It is composed of two villages, Soroștin (Schorsten; Sorostély) and Șeica Mică.

The route of the Via Transilvanica long-distance trail passes through the village of Șeica Mică.

== Tourism ==
- The fortified church of Șeica Mică
- Mud volcanos of Soroștin
