= Romanian railway services =

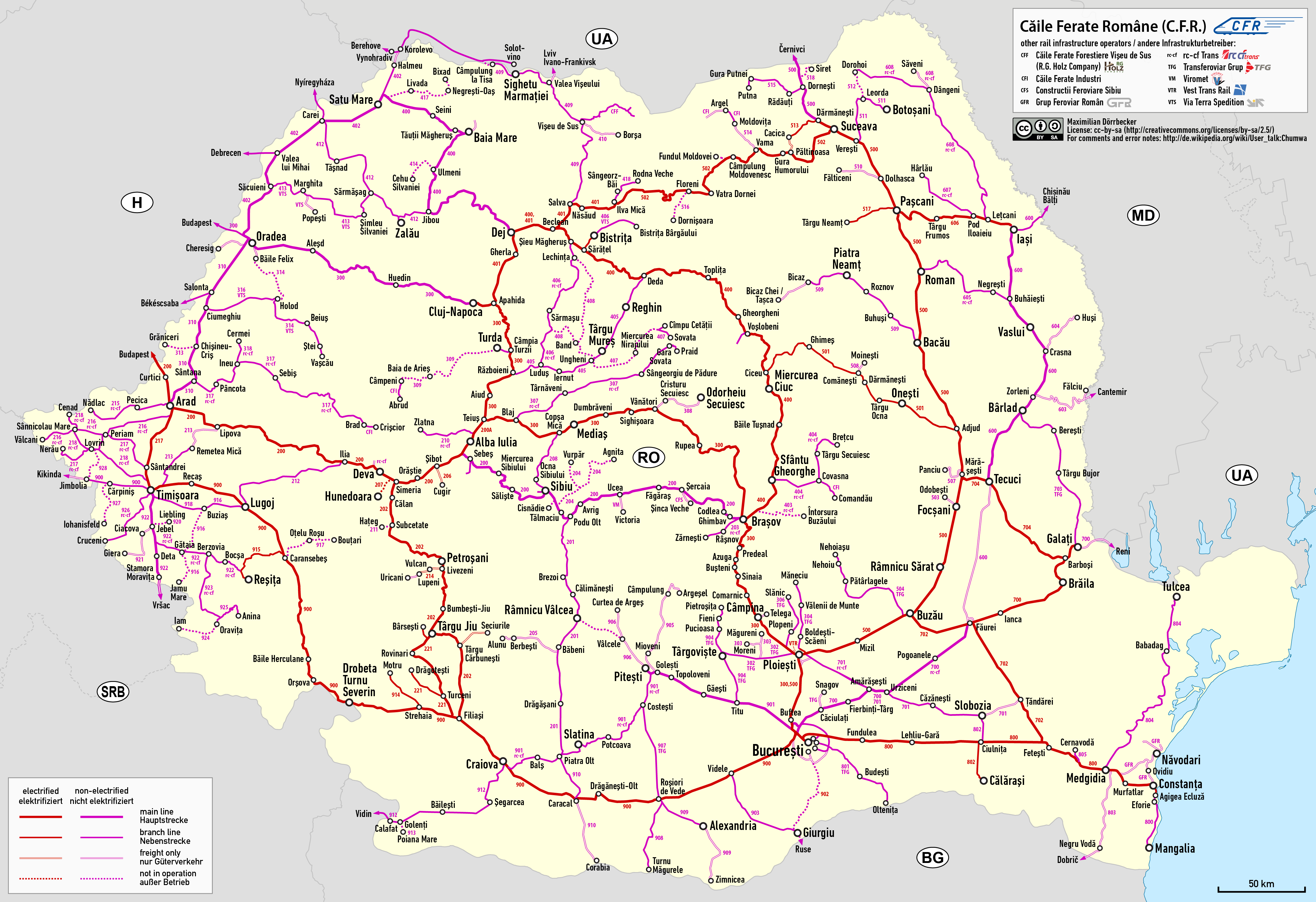

Romanian railway services is an index page of all the rail services operated in Romania. Railway services in Romania are operated by the following operators (see also rail transport operators in Romania):

- CFR Călători
- Regiotrans
- Regional (Via Terra Spedition)
- Transferoviar Grup
- Servtrans

== Passenger services ==
CFR operates several different passenger services as compared to other private operators which only offer slow train and medium speed train operations (ex. Regiotrans, Regional). CFR had the following operating classes for passenger services until 11 December 2011, when the newly harmonised European classifications of trains came into order:

- EuroNight (EN) - numbered as IC trains from 500 to 599
- EuroCity (EC) - numbered as IC trains from 500 to 599
- InterCity (IC) - numbered from 500 to 599
- Rapid (R) - numbered from 200 to 499, from 600 to 999 and from 10000 to 14999
- Accelerat (A) - numbered from 1000 to 1999
- Personal (P) - numbered from 2000 to 9999

Post 11 December 2011, there are 3 main classes of trains with several technical variations in classification:

- Intercity (IC)
  - Intercity Night
  - EuroCity
  - EuroCity Night
- InterRegio (IR)
  - InterRegio Night
- Regio (R)
  - Regio Express
  - Regio Urban
  - Regio Suburban

EuroCity (EC) and EuroNight (EN) are international trains which are usually run by CFR in partnership with another national carrier, depending on the origin and destination of the route.

== Intercity services ==
Series:	Train Type:	Route:	Material:	Frequency:	Notes:
521 "Aurel Vlaicu"	IC	Teiuș - Alba Iulia - Vințu de Jos - Simeria - Deva - Arad	CFR Class 40, 45, 47	1x per day	
522 "Aurel Vlaicu"	IC	Arad - Deva - Simeria - Vințu de Jos - Alba Iulia - Teiuș	CFR Class 40, 45, 47	1x per day	This train leaves carriages for the IC 532 heading towards București Nord.
531 "Avram Iancu"	IC	București Nord - Ploiești Vest - Sinaia - Azuga - Predeal - Brașov - Sighișoara - Mediaș - Blaj - Teiuș - Războieni - Câmpia Turzii - Cluj Napoca - Huedin - Aleșd - Oradea	CFR Class 40, 45, 47, 62, 63, 65	1x per day	
532 "Avram Iancu"	IC	Oradea - Aleșd - Huedin - Cluj Napoca - Câmpia Turzii - Războieni - Teiuș -Blaj - Mediaș - Sighișoara - Brașov - Predeal - Azuga - Sinaia - Ploiești Vest - București Nord	CFR Class 40, 45, 47, 62, 63, 65	1x per day	
541 "Petru Maior"	IC	Brașov - Sfântu Gheorghe - Băile Tușnad - Miercurea Ciuc - Siculeni - Izvoru Mureșului - Gheorgheni - Toplița - Deda - Reghin - Târgu Mureș	CFR Class 40, 45, 47, 62, 63, 65	1x per day	
542 "Petru Maior"	IC	Târgu Mureș - Reghin - Deda - Toplița - Gheorgheni - Izvoru Mureșului - Siculeni - Miercurea Ciuc - Băile Tușnad - Sfântu Gheorghe - Brașov	CFR Class 40, 45, 47, 62, 63, 65	1x per day	This train leaves carriages for the IC 532 heading towards București Nord.
551 "Mihai Eminescu"	IC	București Nord - Ploiești Sud - Buzău - Râmnicu Sărat - Focșani - Mărășești - Adjud - Bacău - Roman - Pașcani - Suceava	CFR Class 40, 45, 47	1x per day	
552 "Ștefan cel Mare"	IC	Suceava - Pașcani - Roman - Bacău - Adjud - Mărășești - Focșani - Râmnicu Sărat - Buzău - Ploiești Sud - București Nord	CFR Class 40, 45, 47	1x per day	
553 "Ștefan cel Mare"	IC	București Nord - Ploiești Sud - Buzău - Râmnicu Sărat - Focșani - Mărășești - Adjud - Bacău - Roman - Pașcani - Suceava	CFR Class 40, 45, 47	1x per day	
554 "Mihai Eminescu"	IC	Suceava - Pașcani - Roman - Bacău - Adjud - Mărășești - Focșani - Râmnicu Sărat - Buzău - Ploiești Sud - București Nord	CFR Class 40, 45, 47	1x per day	
561 "Mihai Eminescu"	IC	Mărășești - Tecuci Nord - Bârlad - Vaslui - Nicolina - Iași	CFR Class 40, 45, 47, 62, 63, 65	1x per day	
562; Ștefan cel Mare"	IC	Iași - Nicolina - Vaslui - Bârlad - Tecuci Nord - Mărășești	CFR Class 40, 45, 47, 62, 63, 65	1x per day	This train leaves carriages for the IC 552 heading towards București Nord.
563 "Ștefan cel Mare"	IC	Mărășești - Tecuci Nord - Bârlad - Vaslui - Nicolina - Iași	CFR Class 40, 45, 47, 62, 63, 65	1x per day	
564 "Mihai Eminescu"	IC	Iași - Nicolina - Vaslui - Bârlad - Tecuci Nord - Mărășești	CFR Class 40, 45, 47, 62, 63, 65	1x per day	This train leaves carriages for the IC 554 heading towards București Nord.
571	IC	București Nord - P.O. Aeroport Henri Coandă - Urziceni - Făurei - Brăila - Galați	CFR Class 40, 45, 47, 62, 63, 65	1x per day	
572	IC	Galați - Brăila - Făurei - Urziceni - P.O. Aeroport Henri Coandă - București Nord	CFR Class 40, 45, 47, 62, 63, 65	1x per day	
591 "Banat"	IC	București Nord - Videle - Roșiori Nord - Caracal - Craiova - Filiași - Balota - Drobeta Turnu Severin - Băile Herculane - Caransebeș - Lugoj - Timișoara Nord	CFR Class 40, 45, 47	1x per day	
592 "Timișoara '89"	IC	Timișoara Nord - Lugoj - Caransebeș - Băile Herculane - Drobeta Turnu Severin - Balota - Filiași - Craiova - Caracal - Roșiori Nord - Videle - București Nord	CFR Class 40, 45, 47	1x per day	
593 "Timișoara '89"	IC	Timișoara Nord - Lugoj - Caransebeș - Băile Herculane - Drobeta Turnu Severin - Balota - Filiași - Craiova - Caracal - Roșiori Nord - Videle - București Nord	CFR Class 40, 45, 47	1x per day	
594 "Banat"	IC	București Nord - Videle - Roșiori Nord - Caracal - Craiova - Filiași - Balota - Drobeta Turnu Severin - Băile Herculane - Caransebeș - Lugoj - Timișoara Nord	CFR Class 40, 45, 47	1x per day	
