= Rail transport in Romania =

Rail network of Romania
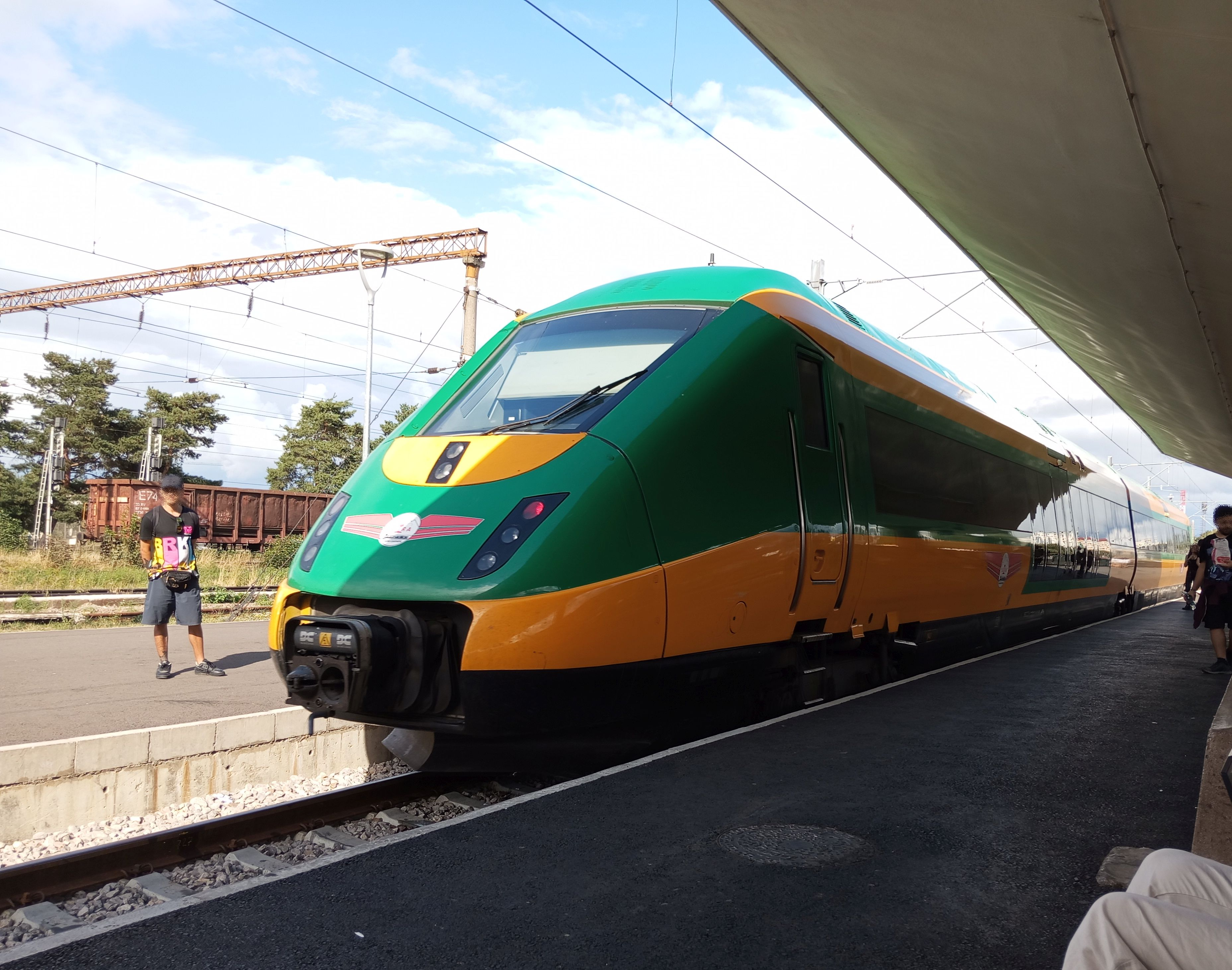
- AnsaldoBreda IC2 trainset of Astra Trans Carpatic

Operation
- National railway: Căile Ferate Române (until 1998)

Statistics
- Passenger-distance: 5,978 km (3,715 mi) (in 2023)

System length
- Total: 10,777 km (6,697 mi)
- Electrified: 4,029 km (2,504 mi)

Track gauge
- Main: 1,435 mm / 4 ft 8 1/2 in standard gauge

Electrification
- Main: 25 kV AC

Features
- No. of tunnels: nearly 200
- No. of bridges: ca. 6800
- No. of stations: over 1000
Map
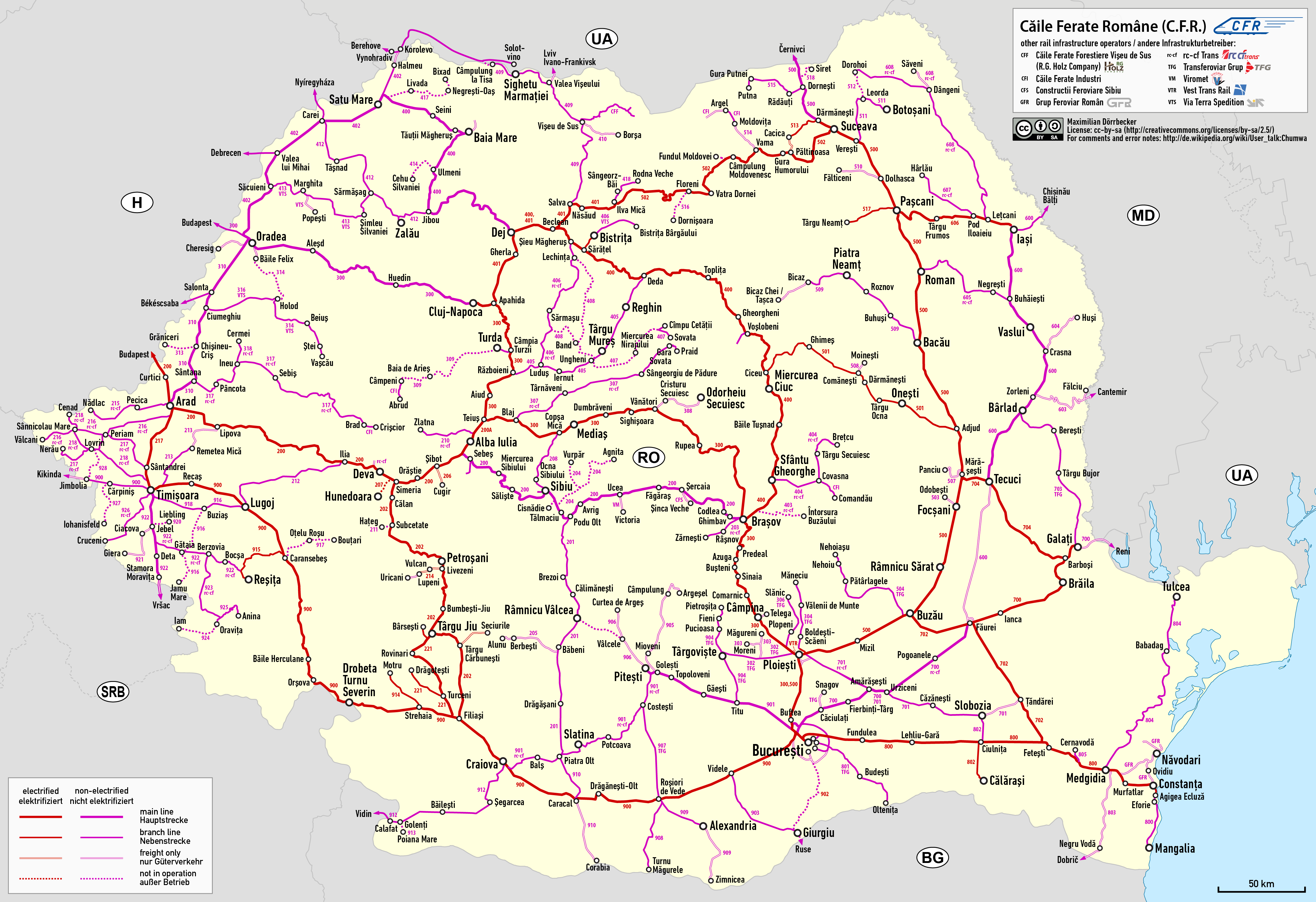

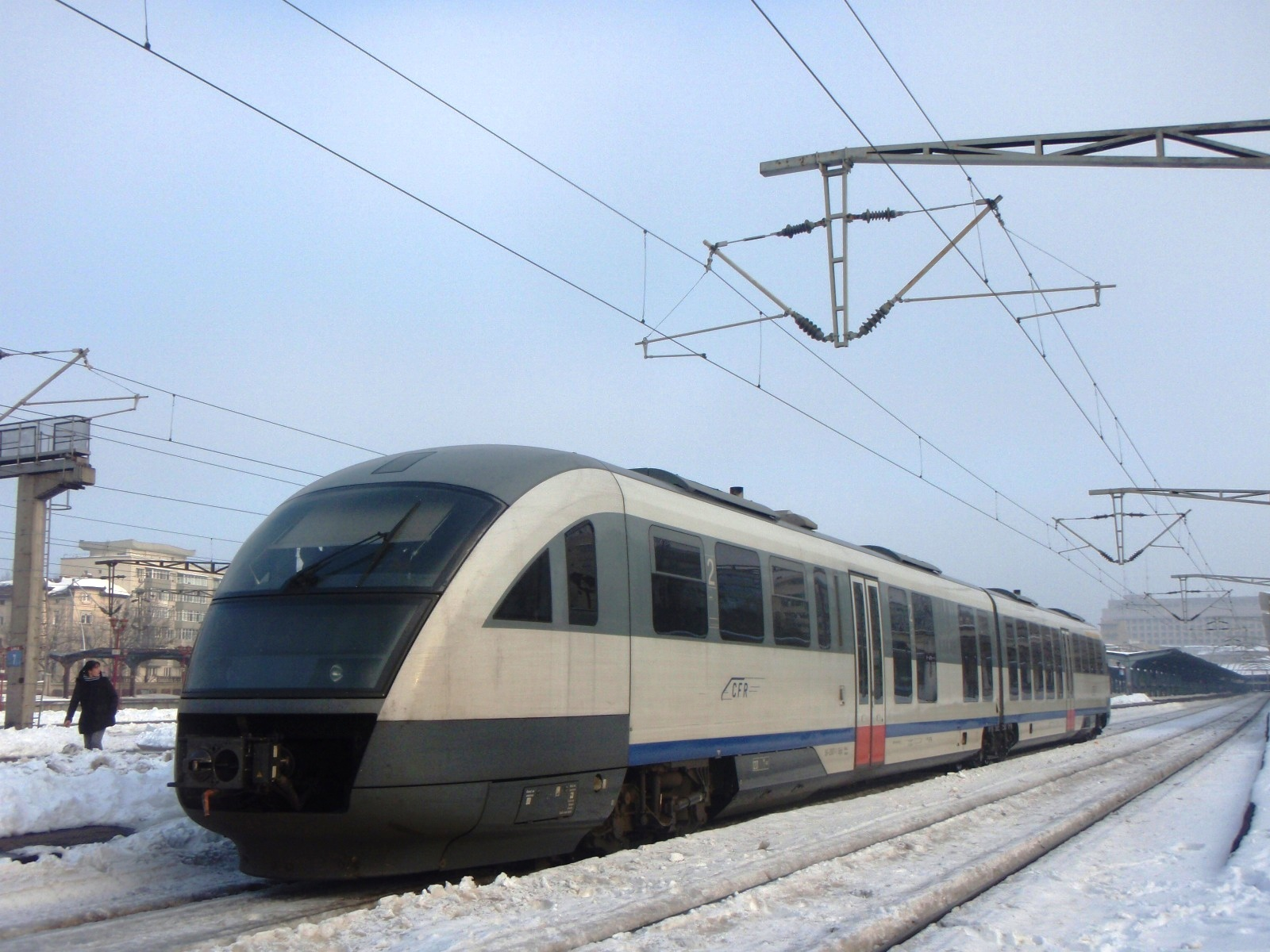
CFR Class 96 diesel multiple unit

Rail transport in Romania goes back to the Austrian Empire, when in 1857 the line between Timișoara and Szeged (now Hungary) opened. The first railway line on territory of the Kingdom of Romania opened in 1869. It linked Bucharest and Giurgiu. Electrification of the Romanian railway network was expedited during the 1950s and 1960s while the country was under a communist regime.

In 2007, based on data from 2005, the CIA World Factbook listed Romania 23rd of the largest railway networks in the world. As of 2009, the length of the Romanian railway network was 10,788 km (6,703 mi). The total length of all tracks was 22,250 km (13,830 mi), which made it the fourth largest in Europe, of which 8,585 km (5,334 mi) (38.5%) were electrified. As of 2014, the total route length was 10,777 km (6,697 mi), of which 4,029 km (2,504 mi) (37.4%) were electrified. However, Romania's railway system is inadequately-connected and one of the least durable railway systems globally.

Between 1880 and 1998, the national carrier was Căile Ferate Române (CFR). It was divided into several successor companies, including among others CFR Marfă (freight operations). Current passenger train operators include Grup Feroviar Român (GFR), Regio Călători (formerly Regiotrans) and Transferoviar Grup (TFG).

Push-pull operations on the electrified standard gauge lines are often carried out using locomotives of the Electroputere LE5100 family (or CFR Class 47). DMUs include the X 4500 and X 72500 (both ex SNCF) and CFR Class 96. Previously operating EMUs included the CFR Class TEA.

Romania is a member of the International Union of Railways (UIC). The UIC Country Code for Romania is 53.

== Partial privatisation ==
Although passenger railway services are not a state monopoly in Romania, CFR remains the only passenger carrier operating at a national level. However, after the reorganization of CFR in 2011, around 15% of Romanian railway tracks have been leased to private companies. These are known as "non-interoperable tracks" (linii neinteroperabile). The main operators are: S.C. Regional S.R.L., S.C. Transferoviar Grup S.A., S.C. Regio Călători S.R.L., and S.C. Servtransinvest S.A., which now operate a significant number (especially Regio Călători) of routes. Early transfers to these companies included Zărnești–Brașov, Brașov–Întorsura Buzăului, Sfântu Gheorghe–Brețcu, Sighișoara–Odorheiu Secuiesc, Șibot–Cugir, Blaj–Praid, Galați–Bârlad, Buzău–Nehoiașu, Iași–Dorohoi, Timișoara Nord–Nerău, Satu Mare–Bixad, Arad–Nădlac, Bistrița Bârgăului–Bistrița Nord–Luduș, Arad–Brad, Roșiori Nord–Piatra Olt and many others lines. On these lines, CFR is not allowed to operate its trains—companies which have leased the tracks have a virtual monopoly on their usage. Aside from CFR Călători, twelve other companies provide local passenger services, on non-interoperable tracks, even though none of these services exceed 40 km (25 mi) in line length. Twenty-eight private companies, including Petromidia and Servtrans, operate freight transport services on main lines with their own rolling stock, leasing usage rights from CFR.

== Future changes ==
September 2014 saw the publication of the government report Master Plan General de Transport al României.

On the face of it the lengthy report envisages reduction of passenger services on 25% to 40% of the lines. The 'small print' reveals however that closures will not happen overnight or even over the next few years (there is no closure schedule in the report); and closures will only occur if private operators or local authority/perhaps EU financial support cannot be obtained. In addition the report has costed major improvements to the long-distance network considerably to reduce journey times. These projects include recommencing work on the abandoned construction (90% completed in the 1990s) of the 39 km (24 mi) link line from Râmnicu Vâlcea to Vâlcele which will reduce the journey from Bucharest to Sibiu by some 78 km and journey times by at least 90 minutes.

== Operators ==
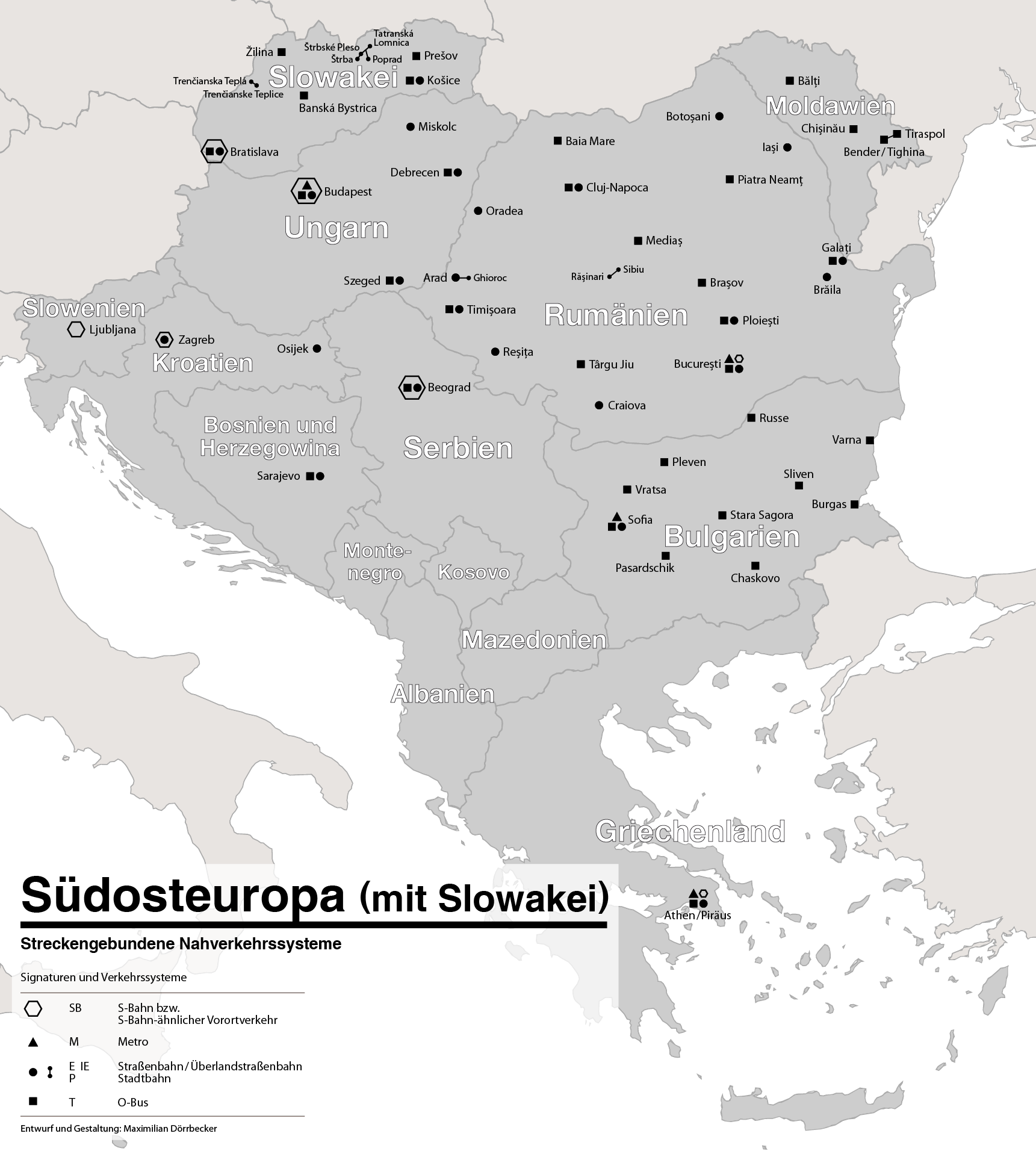
Map of suburban railways, rapid transit and light rail transit systems, tram, trolleybus in Southeast Europe in 2011

The network used to be operated by Căile Ferate Române, the state railway company, but since 1998, a number of private companies have begun operations in passenger and/or freight transport.

- Regio Călători
- Grup Feroviar Român
- Servtrans
- Softrans
- Transferoviar Grup
- Unifertrans
- Astra Trans Carpatic

CFR's rail freight division became CFR Marfă.

== Rail links with adjacent countries ==
- Same gauge (1,435 mm (4 ft 8 1/2 in) standard gauge):
  - Hungary – Multiple crossings (from North to South - Carei, Valea lui Mihai, Episcopia Bihor, Salonta, Curtici. Multiple daily passenger frequencies to Budapest and beyond (only to Győr, Mosonmagyaróvár, Hegyeshalom, and Vienna for the moment) from Bucharest and from many cities within Transylvania. Both networks electrified at 25 kV, 50 Hz AC (only electrified crossing at Curtici/Lokoshaza).
  - Serbia – crossings at Jimbolia and Stamora Moravița. As of March 2020, no passenger rail transport from Bucharest to Belgrade via Timișoara and Vršac. No electrified crossings.
  - Bulgaria – crossings at Calafat, Giurgiu and Negru Vodă. Daily passenger service to Sofia and beyond (Athens and Istanbul) from Bucharest. No voltage issues (currently no electrified crossings, Calafat-Vidin crossing electrification is planned, same voltage, 25 kV, 50 Hz AC.
  - Ukraine – Dual gauge crossing at Halmeu. Crossing not electrified. Currently freight only. Dual gauge line enables standard gauge connections with Hungary and Slovakia through Chop.
- Break-of-gauge:
  - Ukraine – Break-of-gauge 1,435 mm (4 ft 8 1/2 in)/1,520 mm (4 ft 11 27/32 in). Crossings at Vicșani, Valea Vișeului and Câmpulung la Tisa (including bogie conversion systems). Dual gauge (4 rail) track exists between Tereseva (Ukraine)/Câmpulung la Tisa – Sighetu Marmației – Valea Vișeului, going back into Ukraine. Ukrainian trains (both freight and passenger services) occasionally use this route without stopping within Romania. International passenger services exists between Bucharest and Kyiv (and onwards to Moscow) via Vicșani (operated by CFR, with UZ and RZD cars) and between Sighetu Marmației and Teresva (operated by UZ). Crossings are not electrified.
  - Moldova – Break-of-gauge 1,435 mm (4 ft 8 1/2 in)/1,520 mm (4 ft 11 27/32 in). Crossings and bogie changers exist at Ungheni (Moldova) and Galați-Reni. Crossings not electrified, as the Moldovan Railways network has Diesel traction only. Daily passenger service to Chișinău from Bucharest. Multiple daily services from Iași.

== Urban rail ==
Urban rail transport in Romania consists of two metro systems and town tramway systems.

== See also ==
- Transport in Romania
- Căile Ferate Române
- Regiotrans
- International Railway Systems
- Romanian railway services
