= SNCF Class X 4500 =

Class of French 2-car diesel multiple unit

X 4500
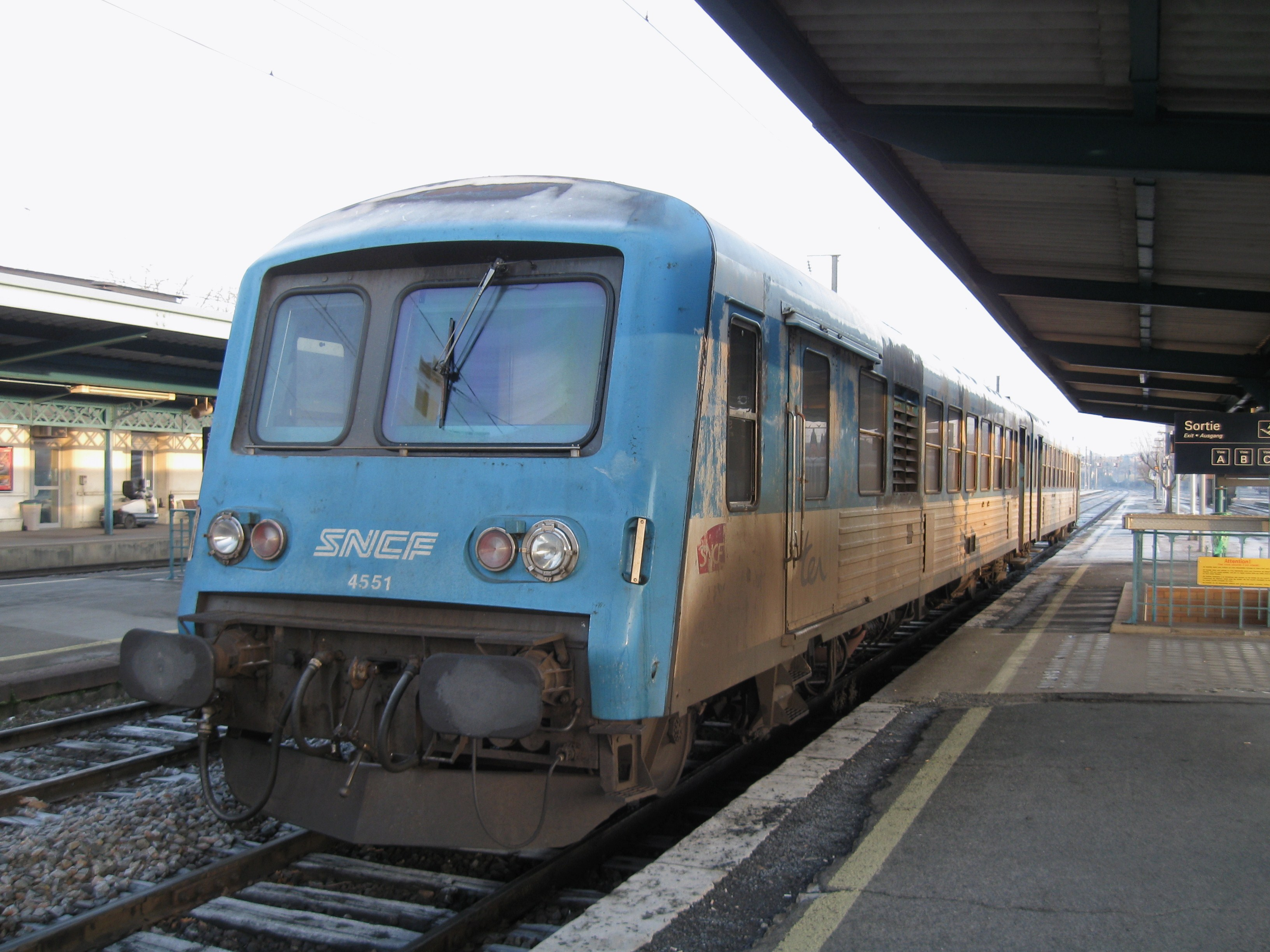
- Rebuilt X 4500 in Allier
- Manufacturer: ANF
- Constructed: 1963–1970
- Number built: 126
- Number in service: 19
- Number preserved: 8
- Fleet numbers: X 4501 – X 4626
- Owners: SNCF; Regiotrans; Via Terra

Specifications
- Car length: 21.240 m (69.69 ft)
- Maximum speed: 120 km/h (75 mph)
- Weight: 35 t (34 long tons; 39 short tons)
- Engine type: Saurer SDHR
- Power output: 320 kW (430 hp)
- Transmission: Mechanical
- Seating: 60

The SNCF Class X 4500 diesel multiple units were built by ANF between 1963 and 1970. The X4500 class are one of four classes of similar design (X 4300, X4500, X4630, X4750) known as "Caravelles". This name comes from when built the engine sound reminded railwaymen of the contemporary French SE210 'Caravelle' jet airliner. X4500 are identical to the earlier Class X4300 except for having a different engine. The motor cars operate with unpowered trailers from either class XR8300 or XR8500 depending on seating demand.

The last 3 members of the class, X 4624, X 4625 and X 4626, were rebuilt from the similar X 4300 class X4351, X4371 and 4385 respectively.

The class has now been withdrawn, some being sold to other countries such as Romania (used by Regiotrans and Via Terra). The last examples in France (14 as of April 2009) worked around Burgundy (Nevers depot).

== Usage ==
The class was used across France on regional services.

=== Preserved units ===
A number of the class have been preserved with organisations in France.

- X 4506, CFT Viaduc 07
- X 4545, Train du pays Cathare et du Fenouillèdes (TPCF).
- X 4554, TPCF.
- X 4567, Train touristique du centre-Var (ATTCV).
- X 4573, TPCF.
- X 4590, ATTCV.
- X 4607, TPCF.
- X 4620, Chemin de fer touristique de la Sarthe (Tansvap).

=== RegioTrans ===
The following units have seen further use in Romania with the company Regiotrans.

- X 4504
- X 4512
- X 4515
- X 4520
- X 4522
- X 4534
- X 4542
- X 4546
- X 4553
- X 4564
- X 4565
- X 4571
- X 4572
- X 4578
- X 4587
- X 4600
- X 4606
- X 4624
- X 4626
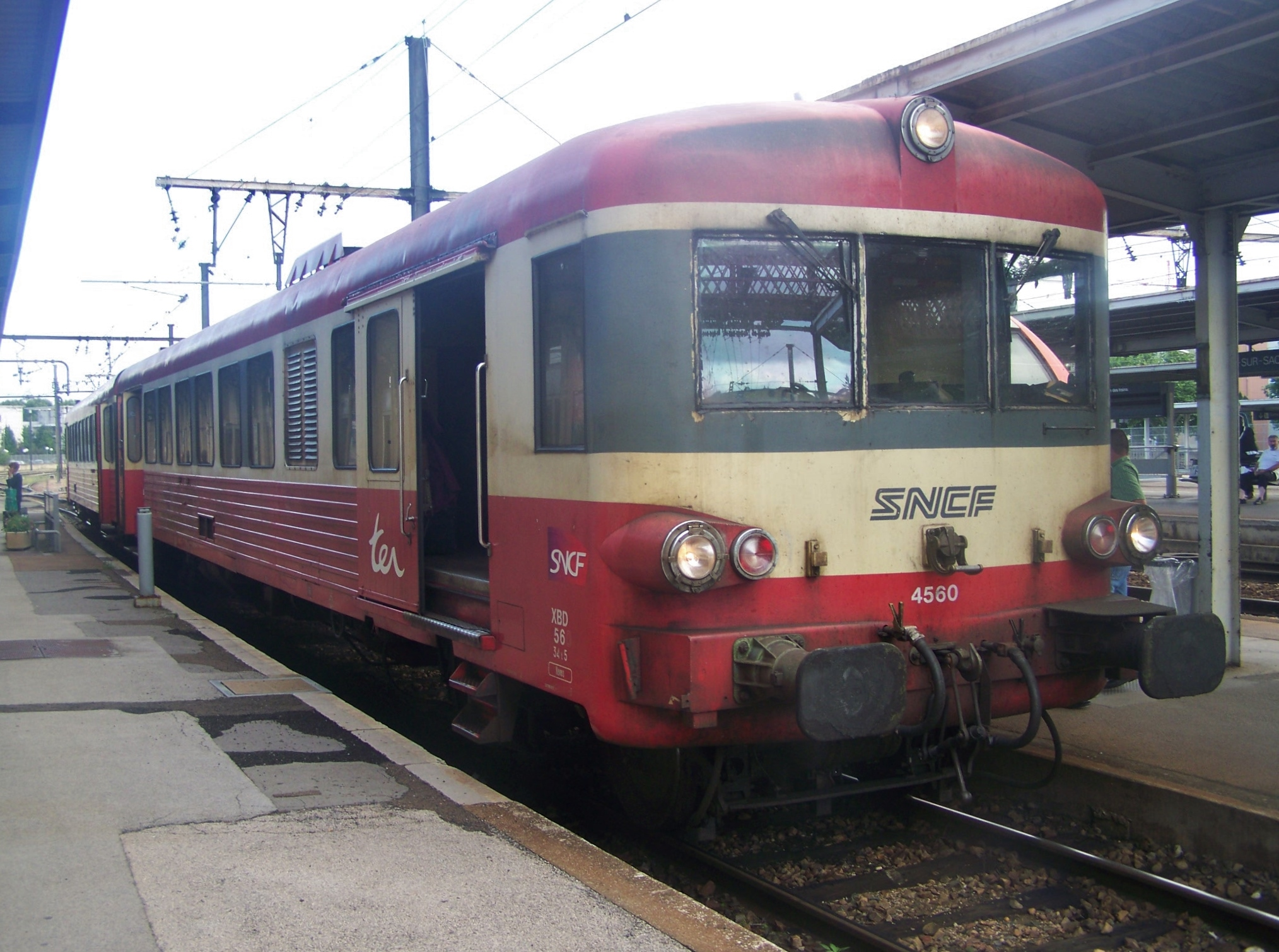
Original X4500

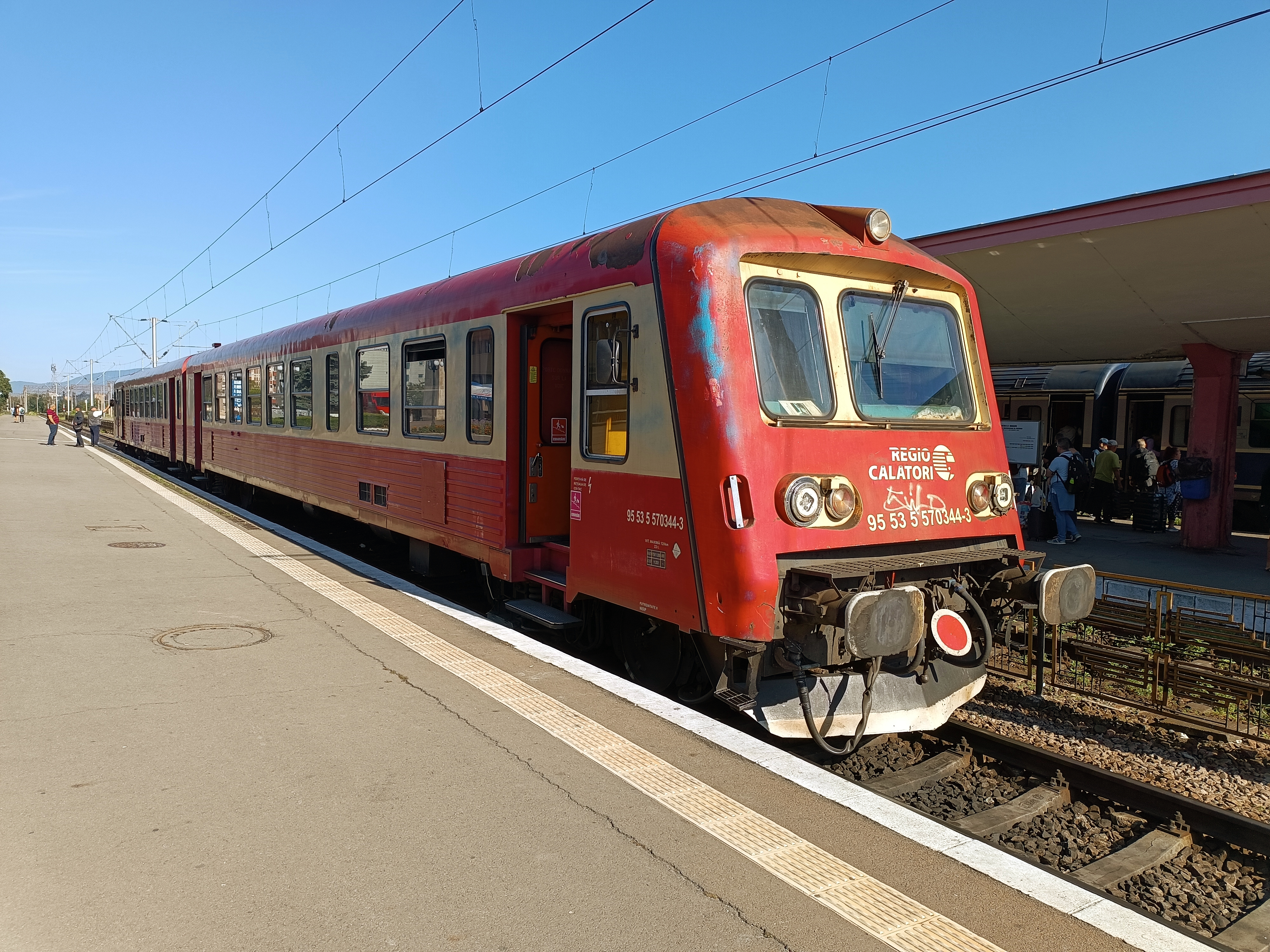
X4500 in Romania
