= Ițcani =

Coordinates: 47.675477°N 26.235572°E

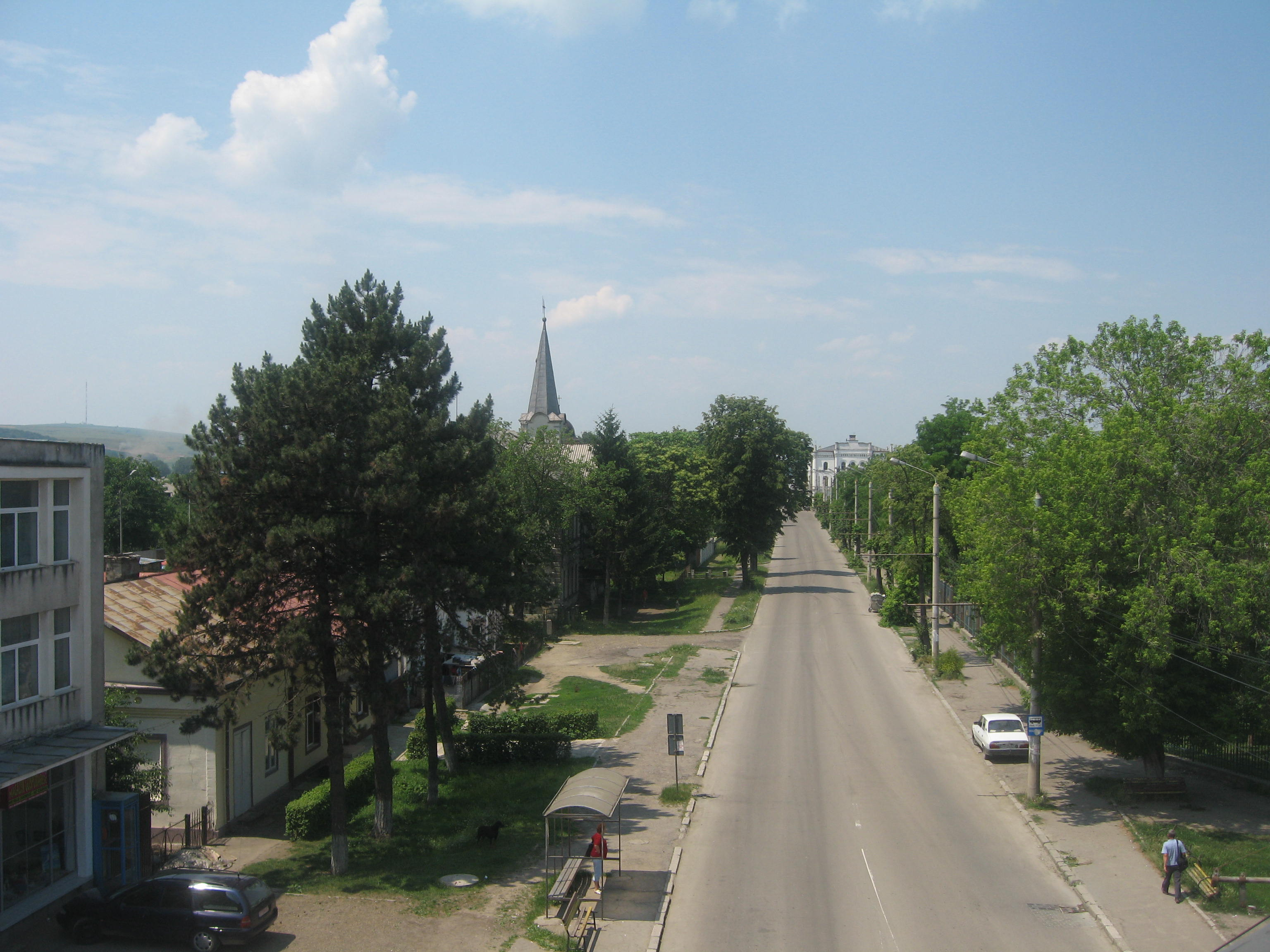
The main road linking Suceava with Ițcani in 2011.

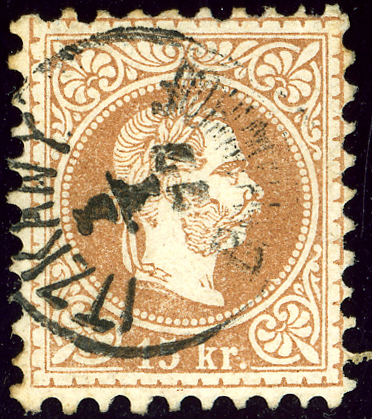
1877 Austrian KK 15 kreuzer stamp cancelled at Itzkany Bahnhof/Ițcani railway station.

Ițcani (German: Itzkany) is a neighbourhood of Suceava, the county seat town (Romanian: oraș reședință de județ) of Suceava County (Romanian: Județul Suceava) in the historical region of Bukovina (Romanian: Bucovina, German: Bukowina/Buchenland), northeastern Romania, located some 5 km northwest of the town center. Ițcani was initially established in the 15th century, following a 1453 document issued by Alexăndrel, Domn (i.e. Prince) of Moldavia.

Along with the rest of Bukovina (or the highlands of the former medieval Principality of Moldavia), it became part of the Habsburg monarchy during the late 18th century and then, gradually, of the Austrian Empire and Austria-Hungary (pertaining to Cisleithania or the Austrian-ruled realms of the former Central European dual monarchy). During the 1780s, 8 ethnic German families settled here in the course of the Josephine colonization (German: Josephinische kolonisation or Josephinisches siedlung).

After the unification of Bukovina with the Kingdom of Romania in 1918, Ițcani was subsequently recorded on official population censuses by the Romanian authorities as a commune composed of two separate villages, more specifically Ițcanii Noi (German: Neu Itzkany) and Ițcani Gară (German: Itzkany Bahnhof).

Furthermore, according to the 1930 Romanian census, as much as 45% of the commune's population was composed of ethnic Germans (i.e. Bukovina Germans), many of whom were later forcefully re-settled in occupied Poland during World War II as part of the Heim ins Reich policy plan initiated by Nazi Germany. Suceava North railway station (German: Itzkany Banhof) is located in Ițcani.

== History ==
Historical affiliations

Moldavia (1388–1775)
Habsburg Monarchy (1775–1804)
Austrian Empire (1804–1867)
Austria-Hungary, Cisleithania (1867–1918)
Kingdom of Romania (1918–1947)
Romanian People's Republic (1947–1965)
Socialist Republic of Romania (1965–1989)
Romania (1989–present)

Ițcani was part of the Principality of Moldavia throughout the late Middle Ages. Subsequently, it became part of the Habsburg monarchy in the late 18th century, the Austrian Empire during the early 19th century, and, later on, Austria-Hungary between the late 19th century and early 20th century, being situated at the crossroads between the Duchy of Bukovina (German: Herzogtum Bukowina/Buchenland, Romanian: Ducatul Bucovinei) and the Romanian Old Kingdom (Romanian: Vechiul Regat, German: Altreich).

After the end of World War I, in 1918, it became part of the Kingdom of Romania (being later on integrated in Ținutul Suceava) and remained part of the Romanian state ever since. After 1947, it became part of Suceava County within the Romanian People's Republic (RPR) and then the Socialist Republic of Romania (RSR). It remained as such as well during contemporary Romania after the Romanian Revolution of 1989.

== Demographics ==
Distribution of ethnic groups in Ițcani in 1930:
1. Bukovina Germans (45.07%)
2. Romanians (21.4%)
3. Jews (17.84%)
4. Ukrainians (6.77%)
5. Poles (5.24%)
6. Lipovans (2.15%)
7. Hungarians (1.53%)

The 1930 Romanian census recorded a relative majority for the ethnic Germans (more specifically the Bukovina Germans) living in Ițcani at that time, more specifically 45%, a percentage which overshadowed the other ethnic groups, among which, most notably, were the native Romanians. The latter only accounted for 21.4% of the total population. Other ethnic groups recorded then in the 1930 Romanian census were also the Jews, Ukrainians, Poles, Lipovans, and Hungarians.

During and after the end of World War II, many Bukovina Germans from Ițcani (as with the rest of Germans from Bukovina) were forcefully re-settled by the national socialists in then occupied Poland. Some of then returned, but the vast majority left permanently. Immigration of the Bukovina German community of Ițcani continued to West Germany in communist times as well.

== Cultural heritage of the Bukovina German community in Ițcani ==
Even to this day, after the vast majority of the ethnic Germans from Ițcani were deported to Nazi-occupied Poland, the cultural heritage of this community dating to the Austrian-ruled period endured throughout the decades following the end of World War II through the local architecture of some of the houses belonging to them, the train station, and also the local churches of former Evangelical Lutheran and Roman Catholic confession.

== Recent developments and recent history ==
The neighbourhood's recent history is marked by depopulation and a relative stagnation in economic regards. However, there is potential for further economic development in the future. The vast majority of the Bukovina Germans either left long ago for West Germany (some of them returning) or passed away. Overall, Ițcani remains a poor neighbourhood of Suceava to this day. Nevertheless, it is very ethnically homogenous nowadays, with a strong Romanian majority accounting for much of its population.

== Gallery ==
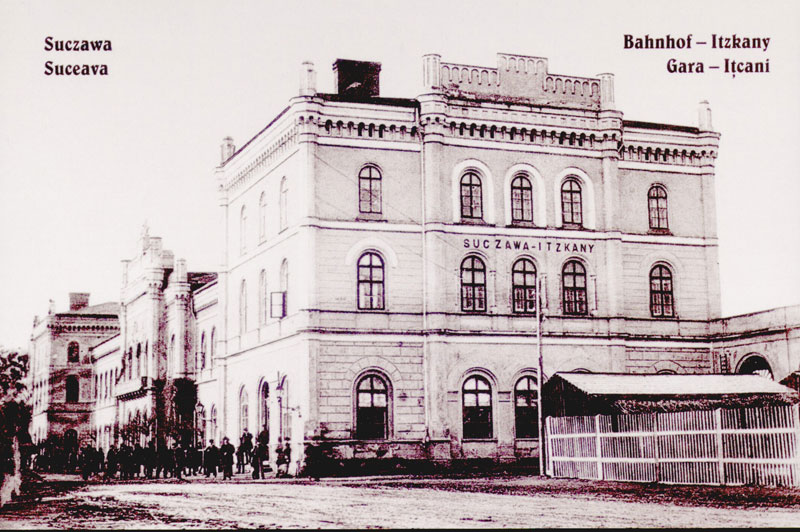
Suceava North Railway station during the Austro-Hungarian period (more specifically early 20th century)

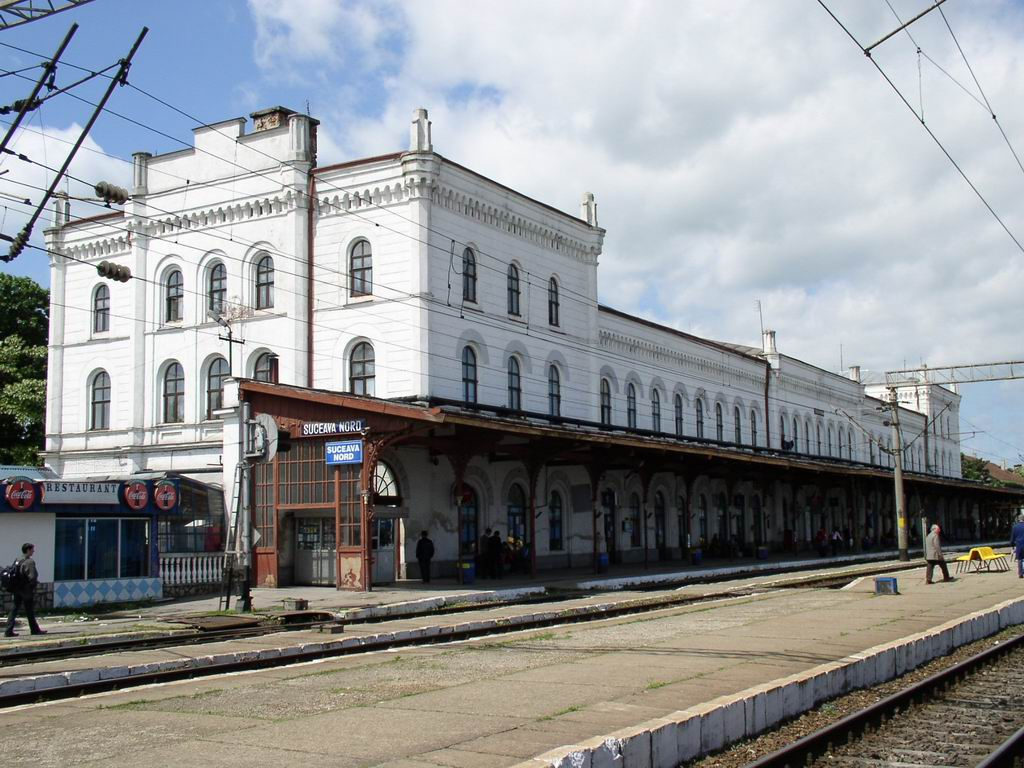
Suceava North Railway station in Ițcani

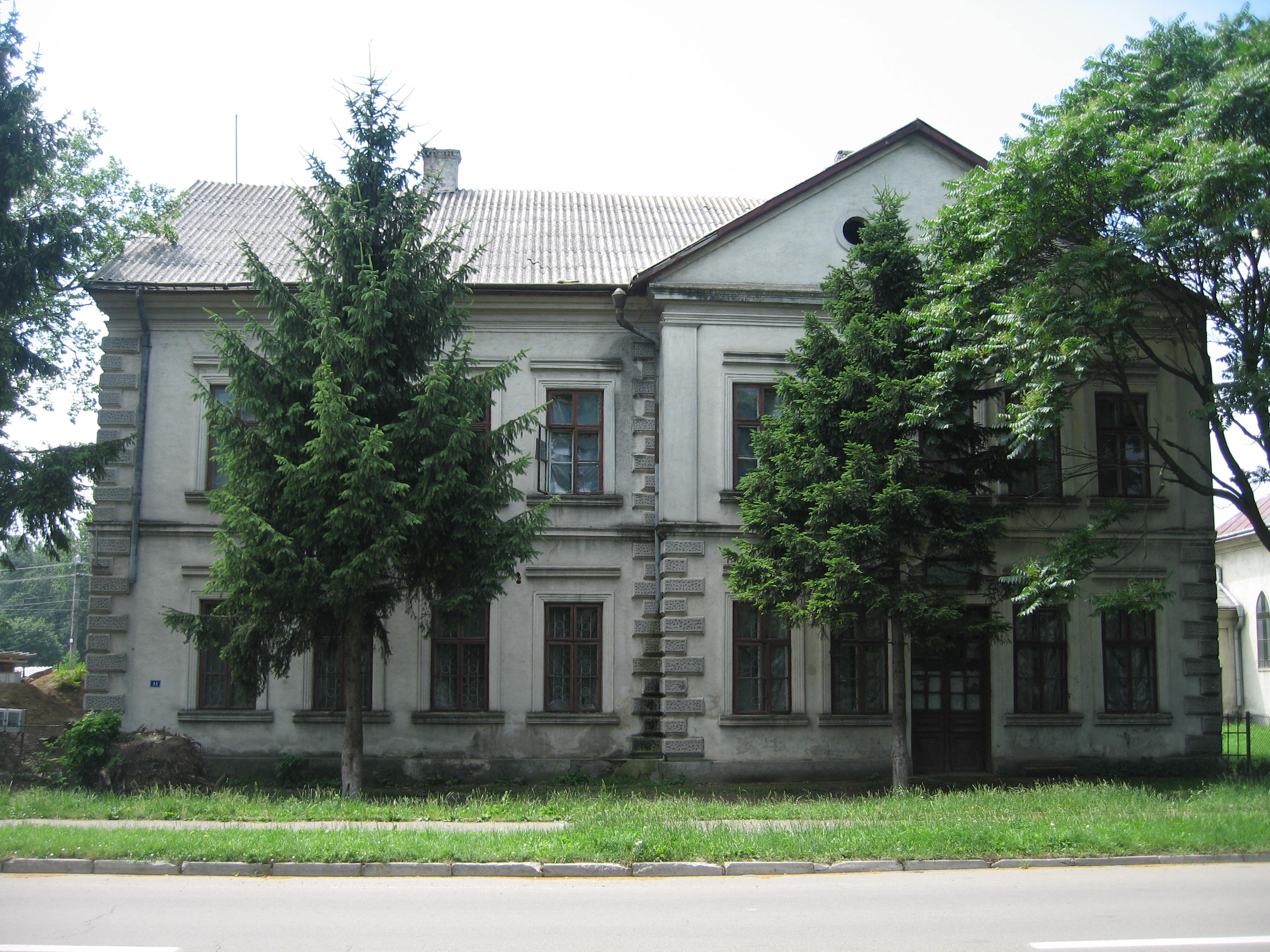
The school in Ițcani

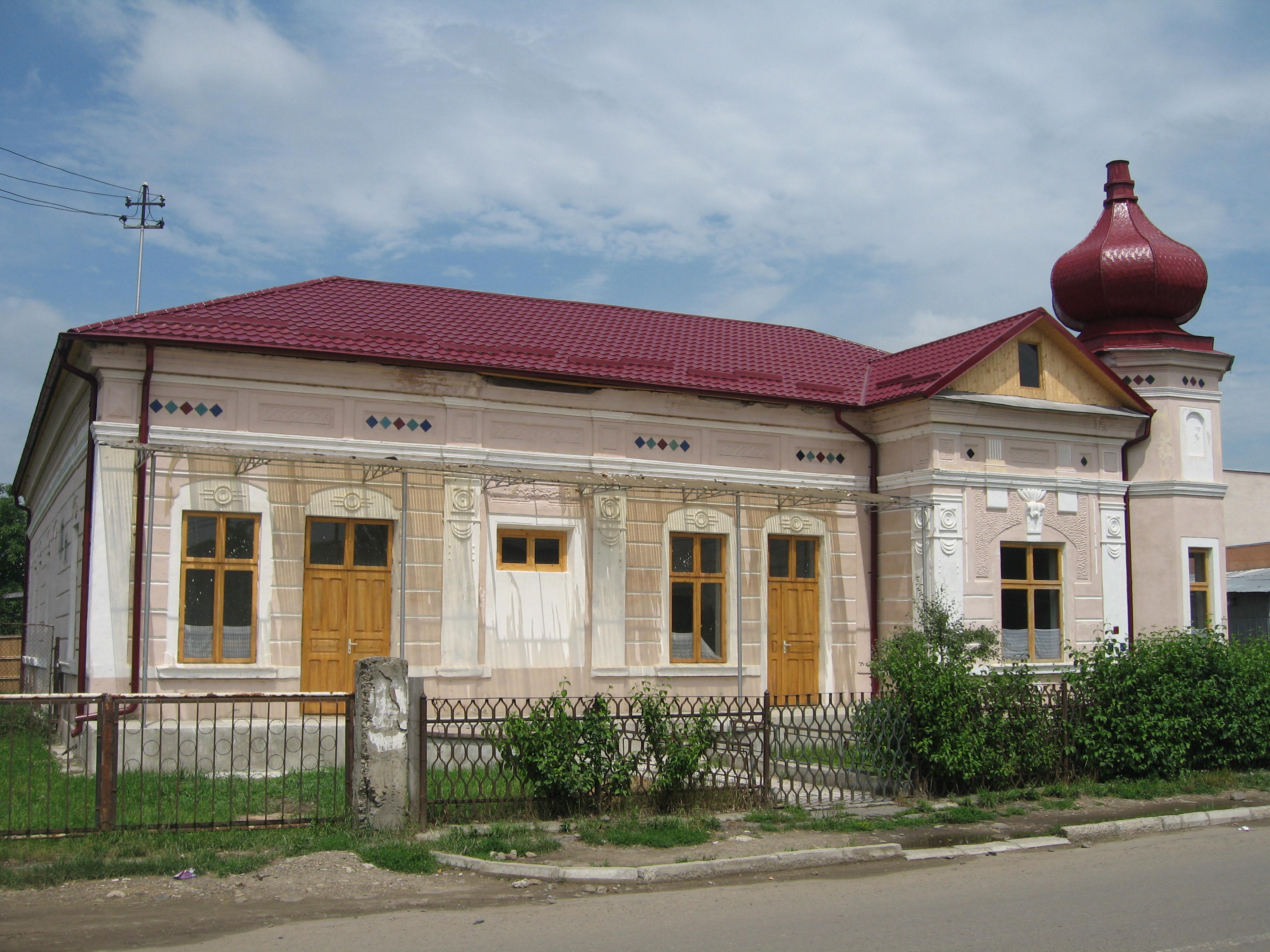
Austrian-style house in Ițcani

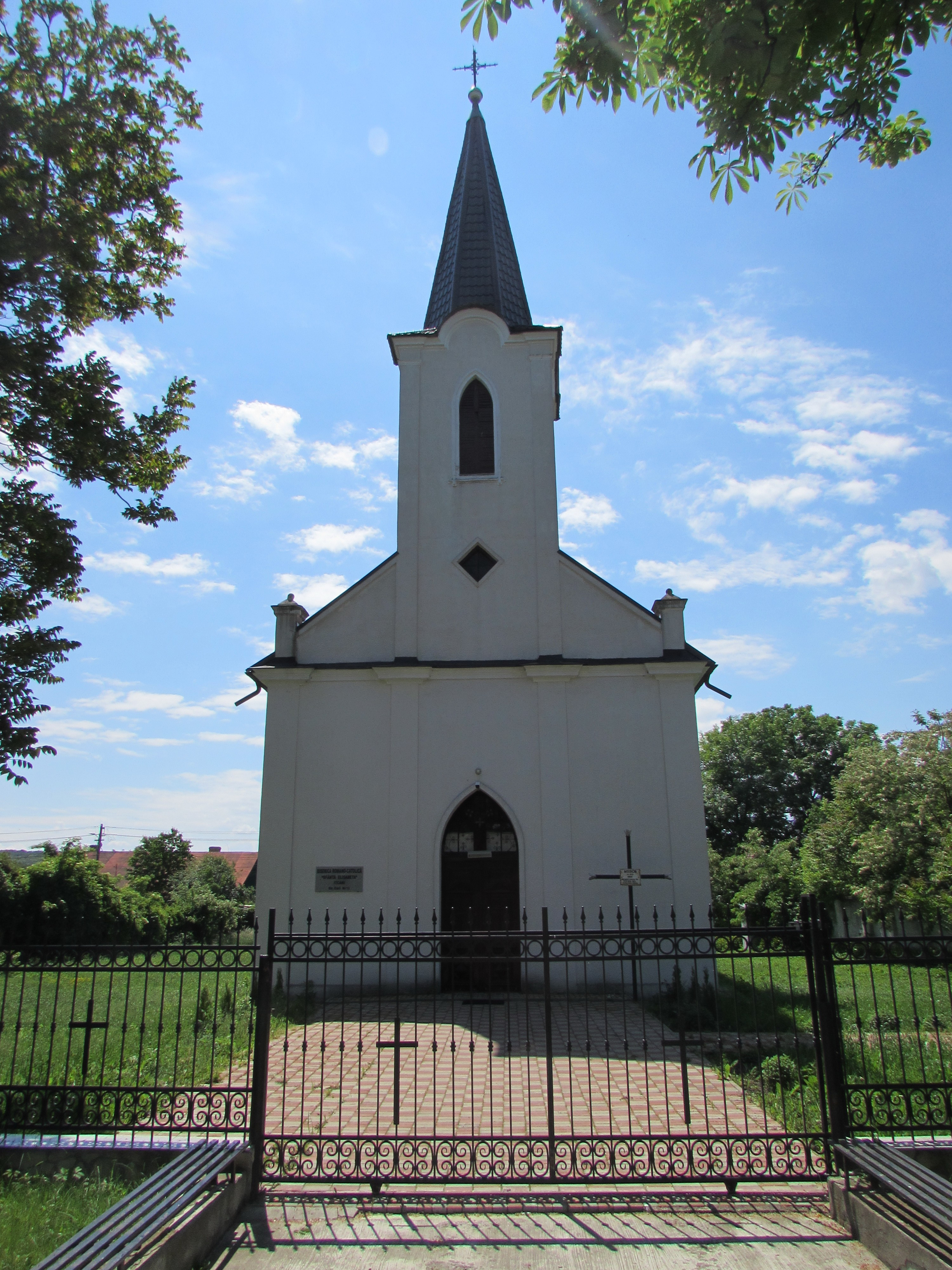
Roman Catholic church of Saint Elisabeth

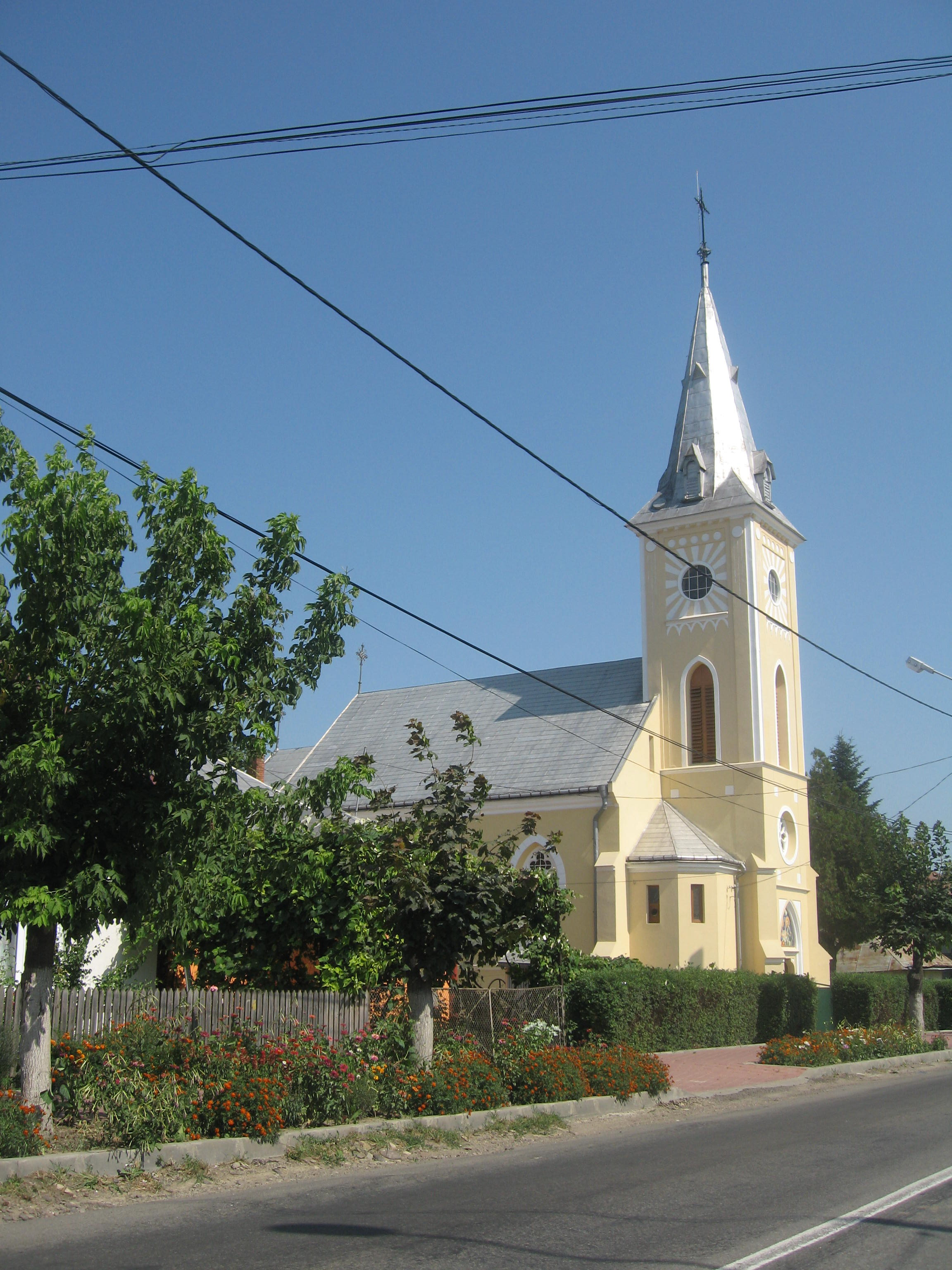
Former St. Apostles Church of the local Bukovina German community

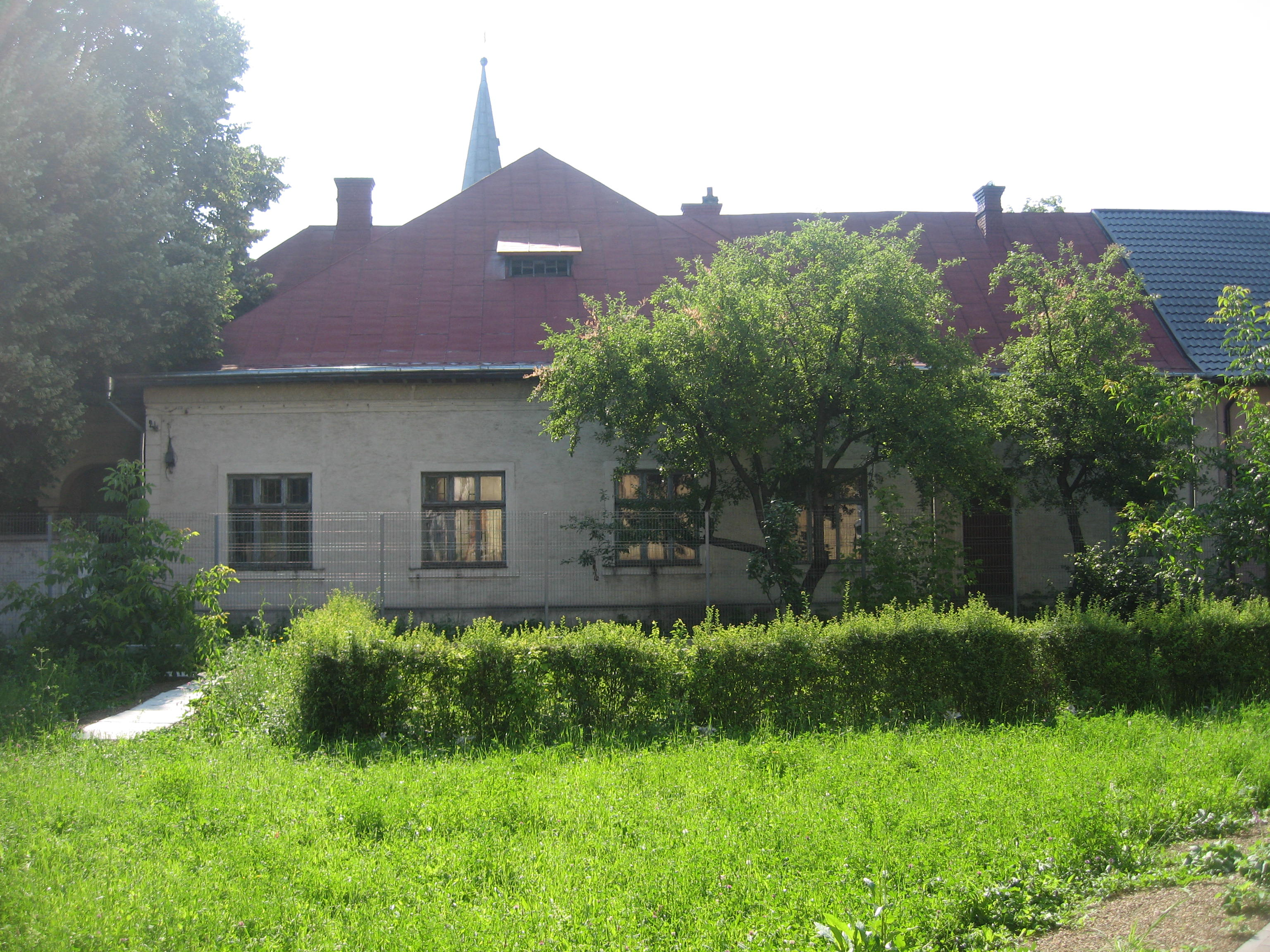
Former town hall in Ițcani

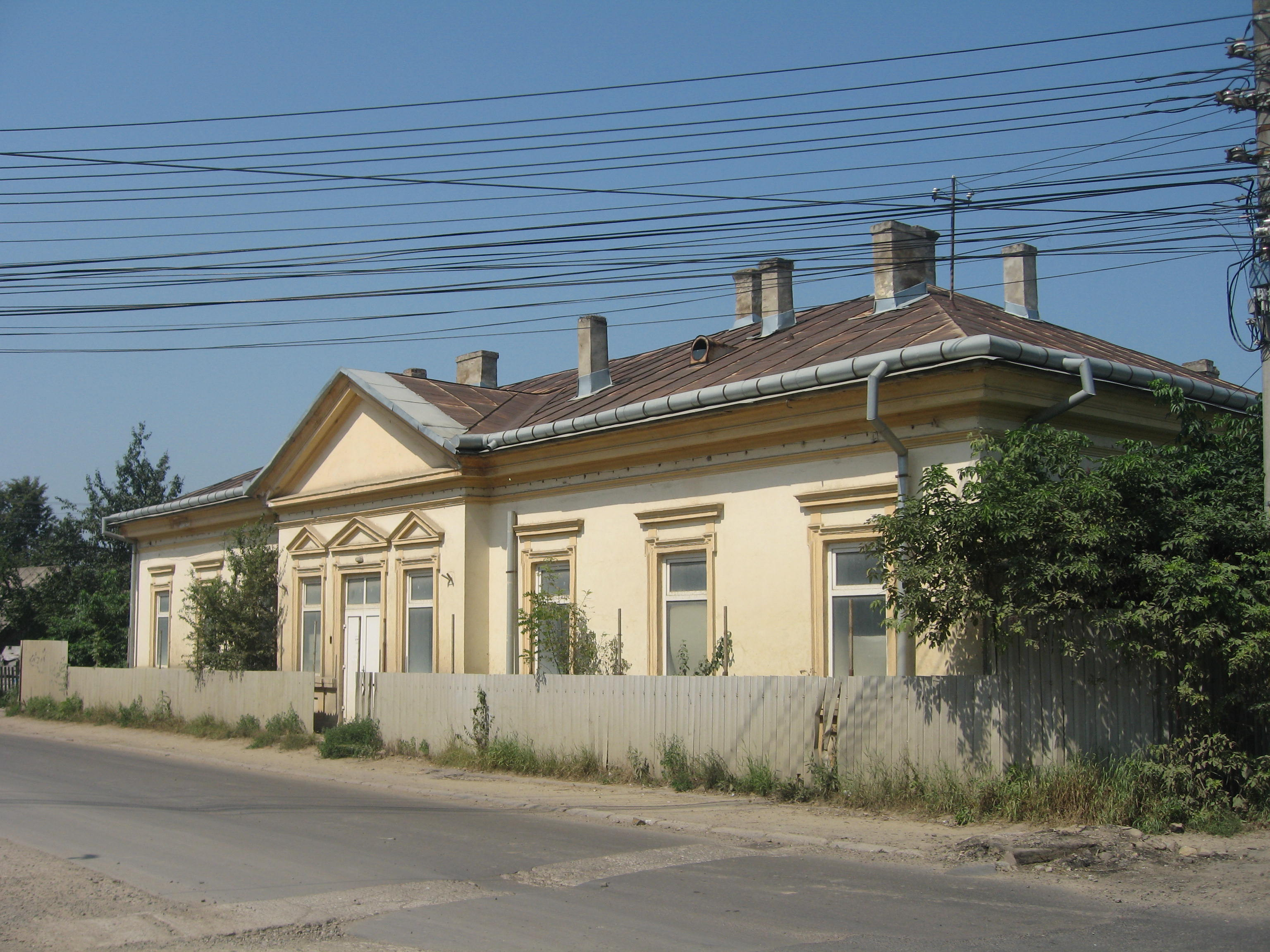
Ițcani border picket

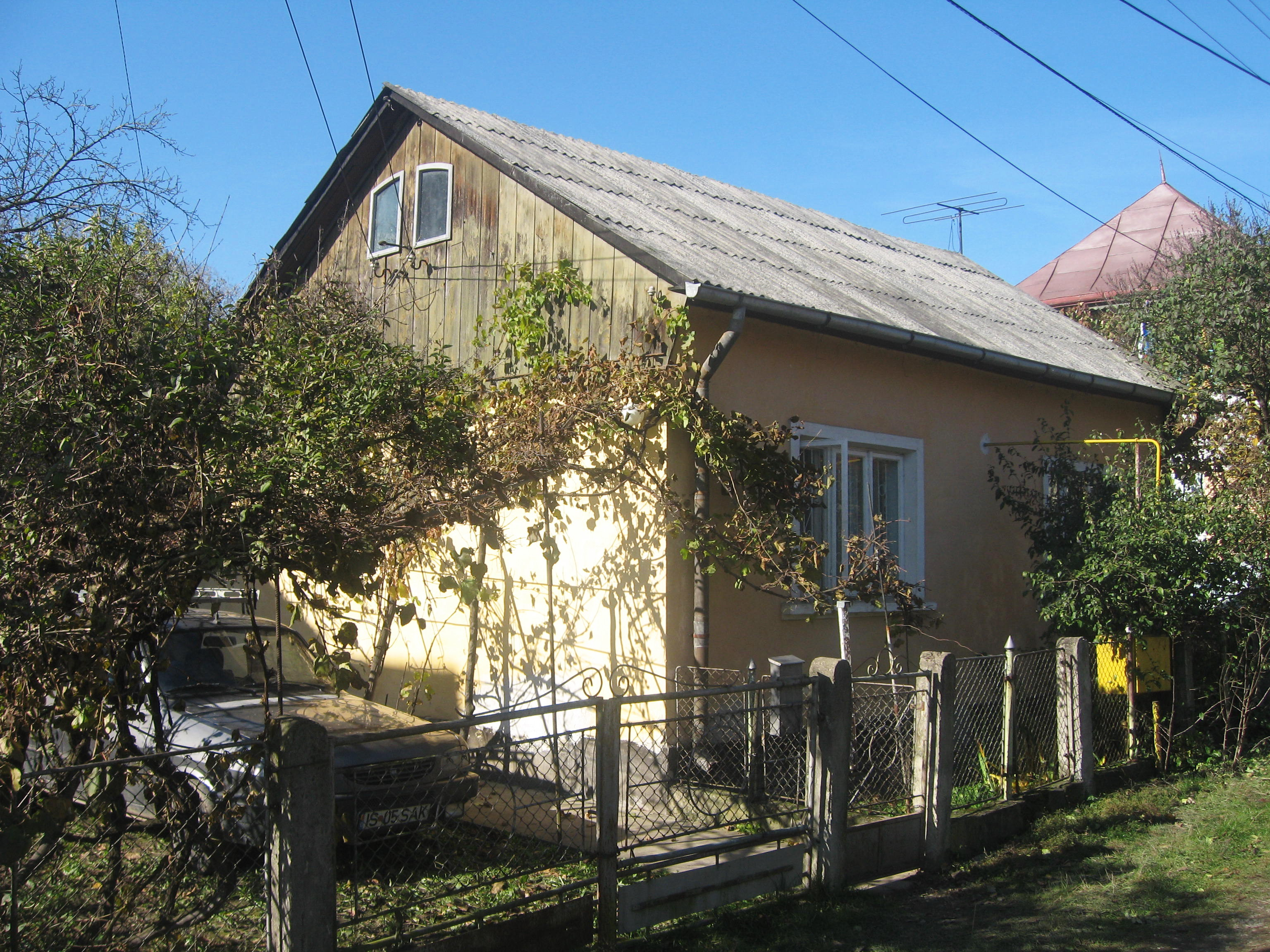
Old house in Ițcani

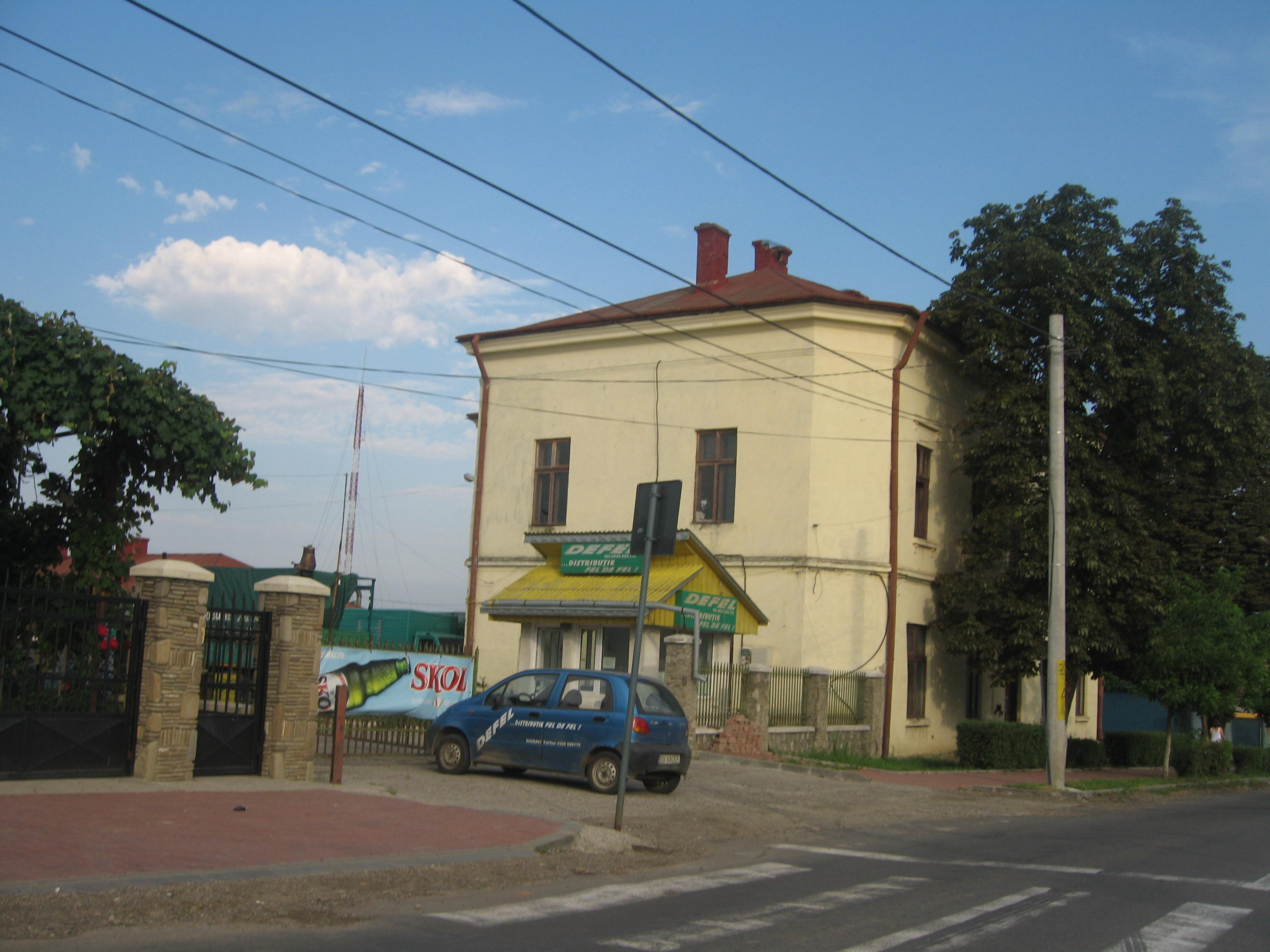
Grigore Alexandru Ghica Street

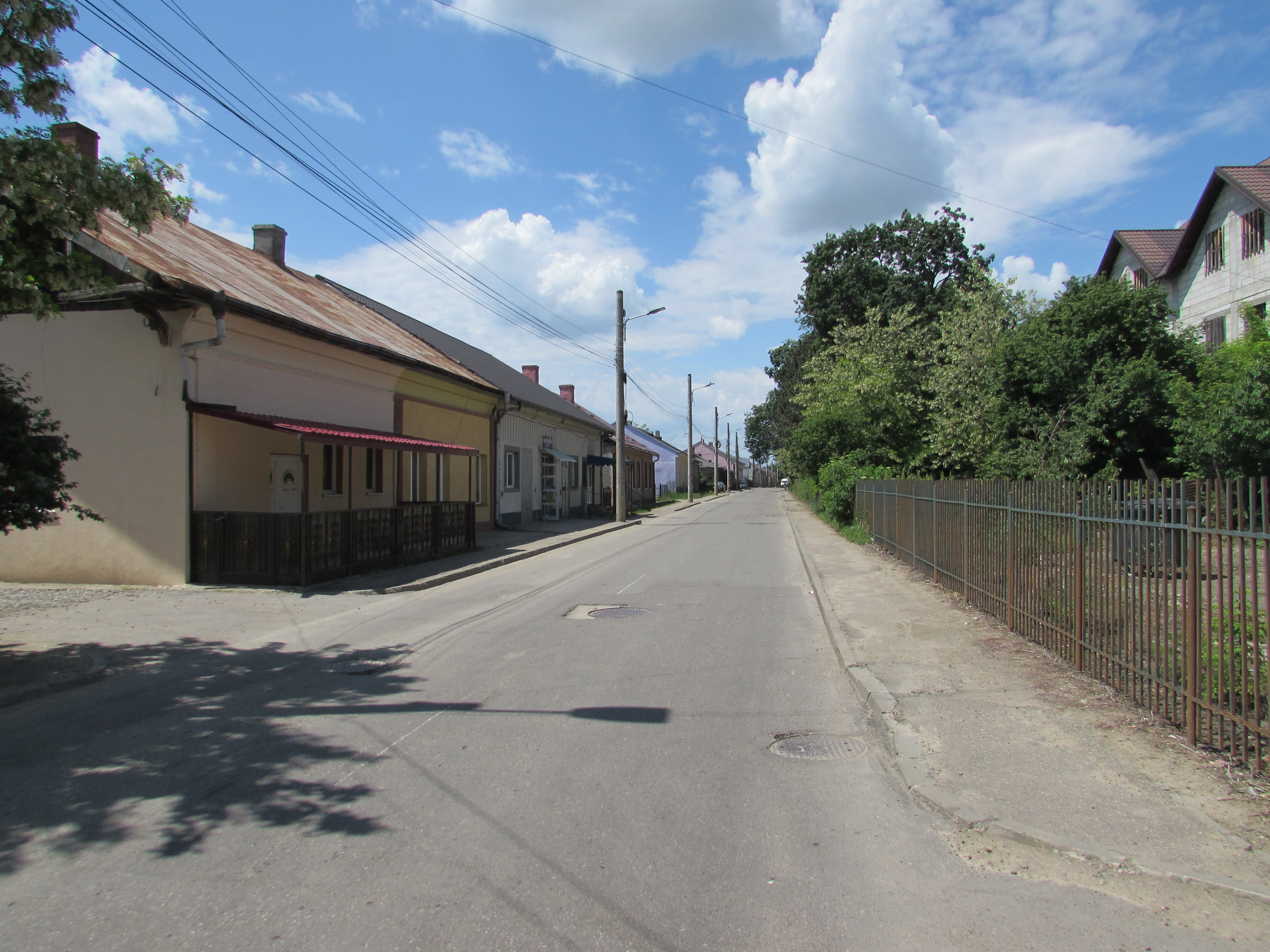
Aurel Vlaicu street in Ițcani

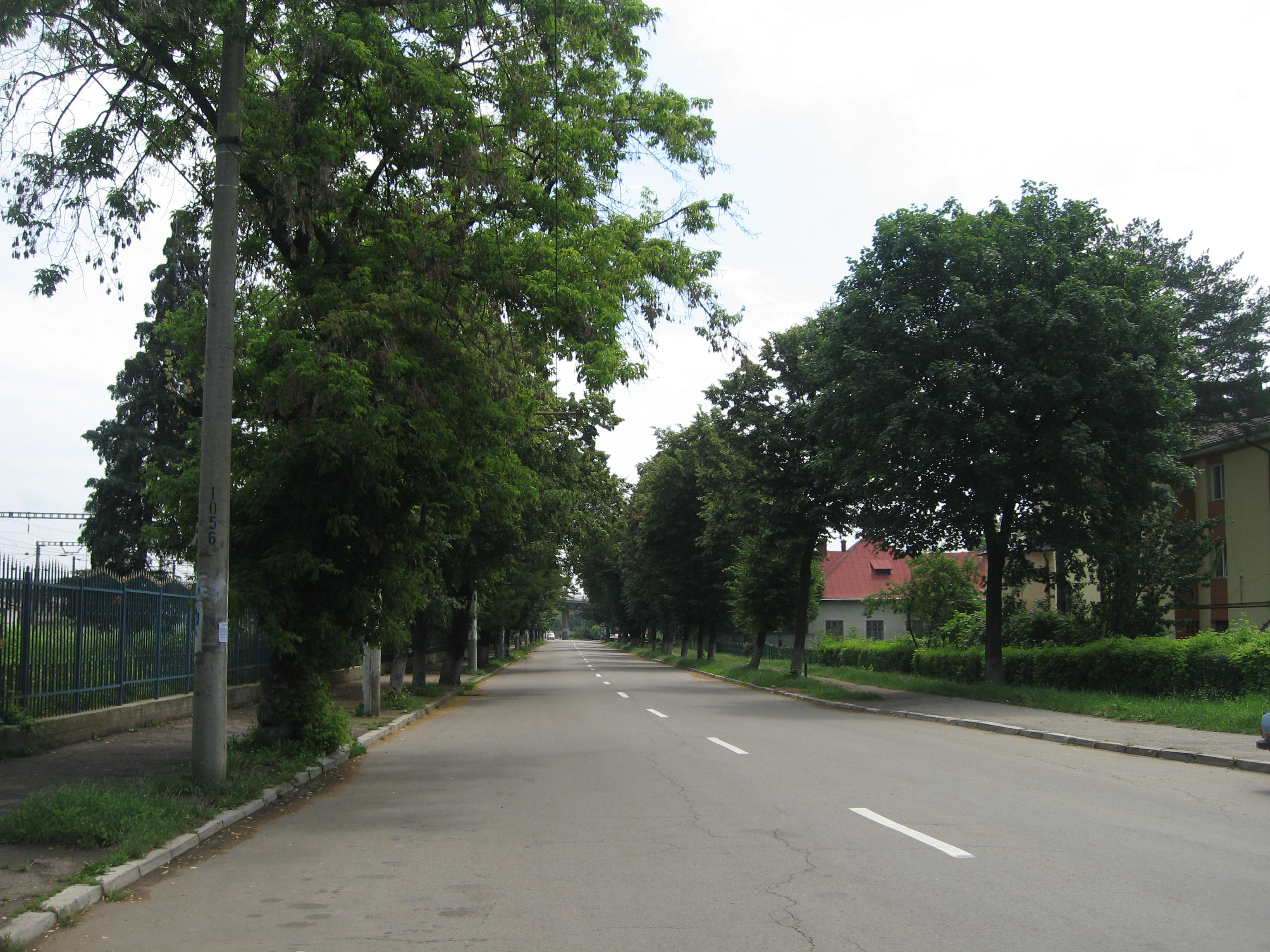
Train station street in Ițcani

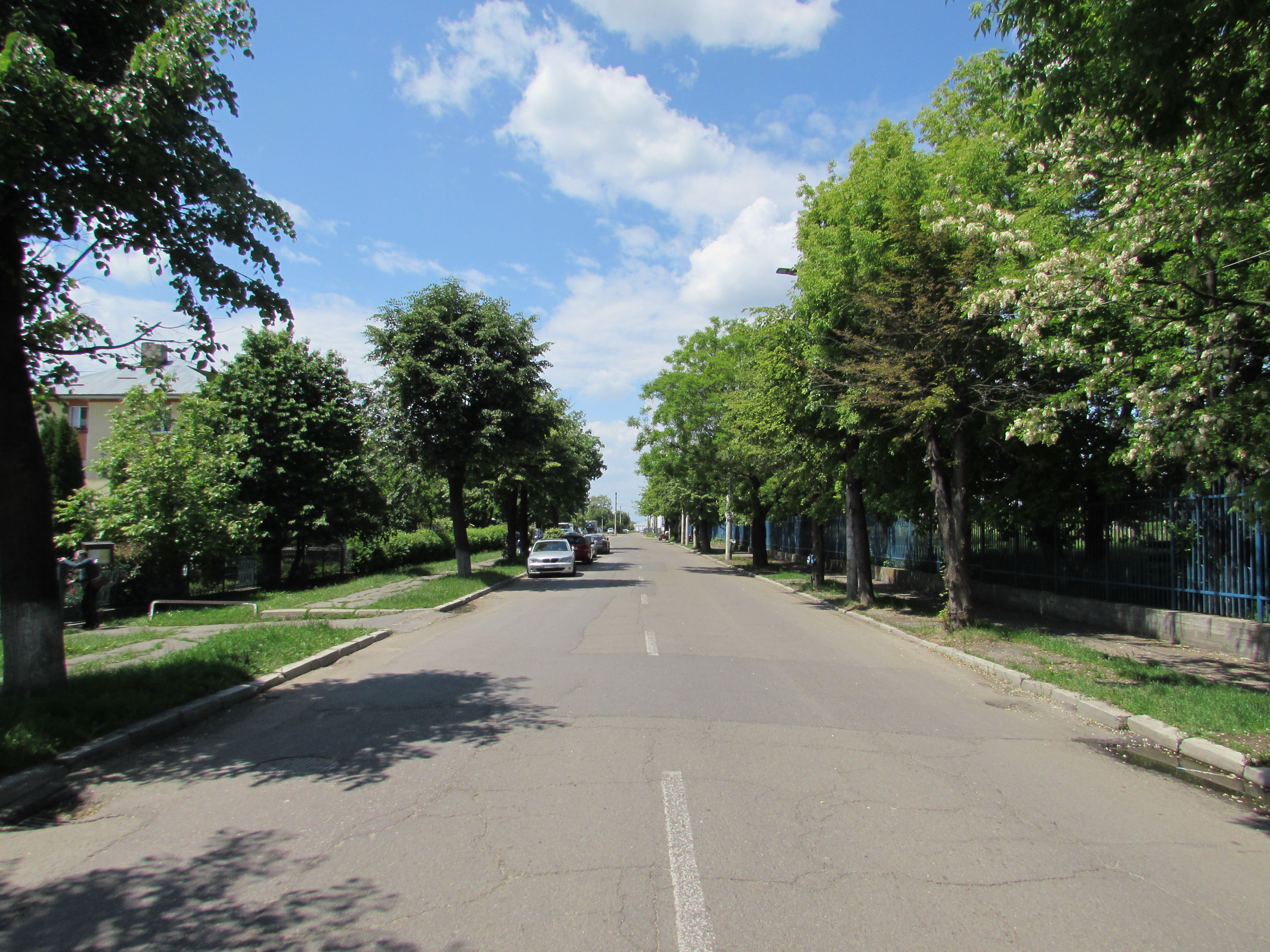
Train station street in Ițcani

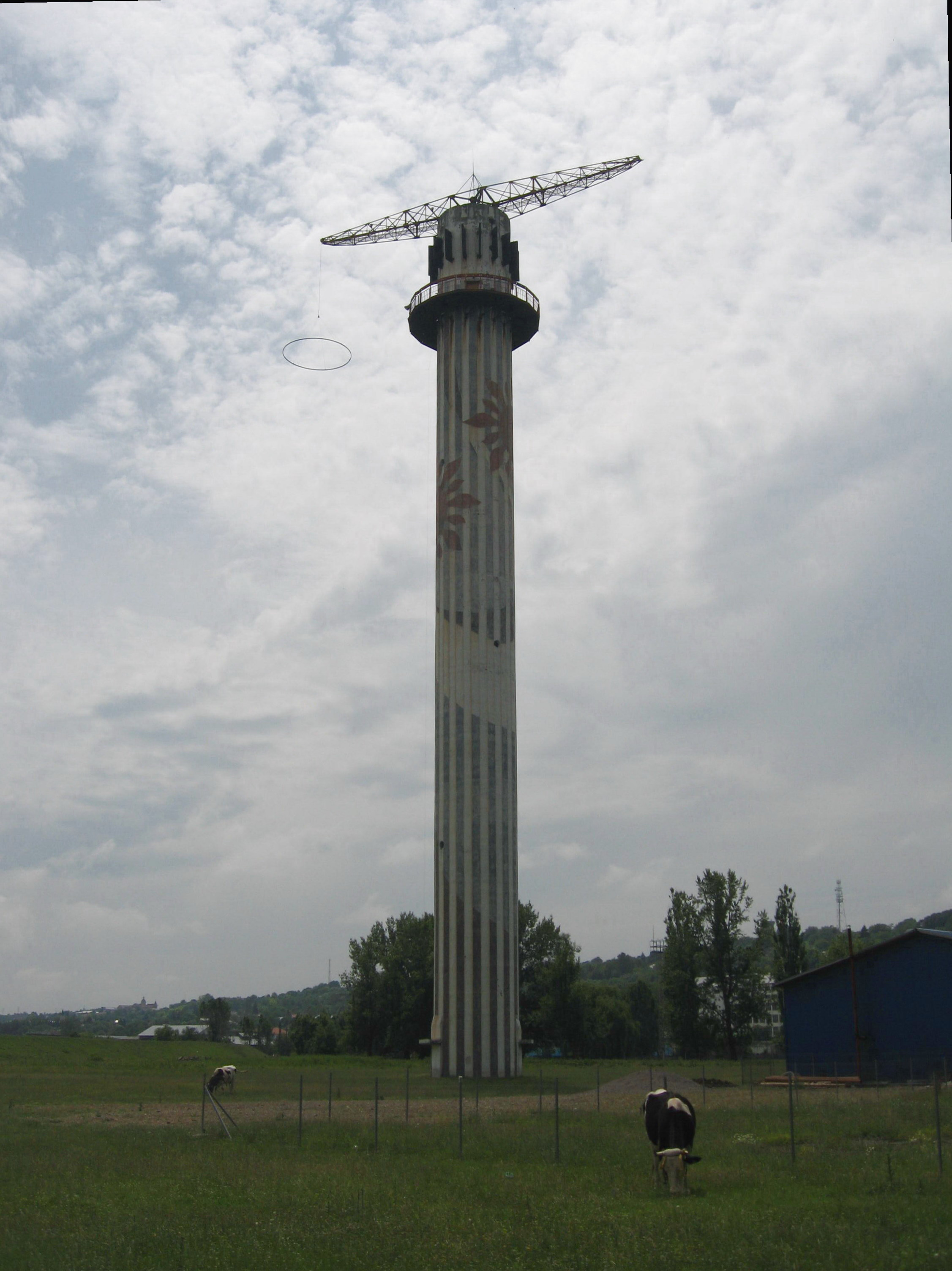
Parachute tower

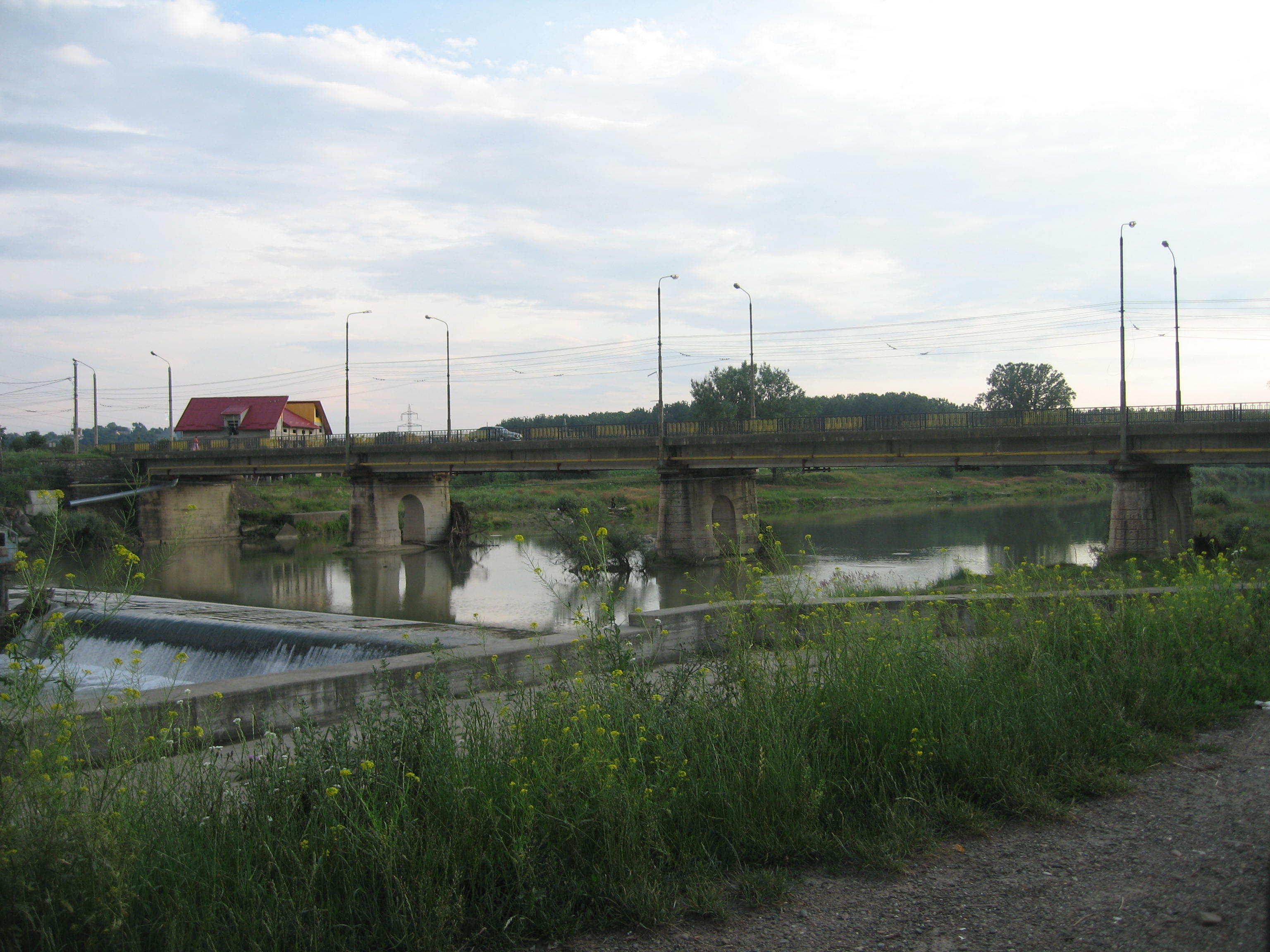
Suceava River flowing in Ițcani

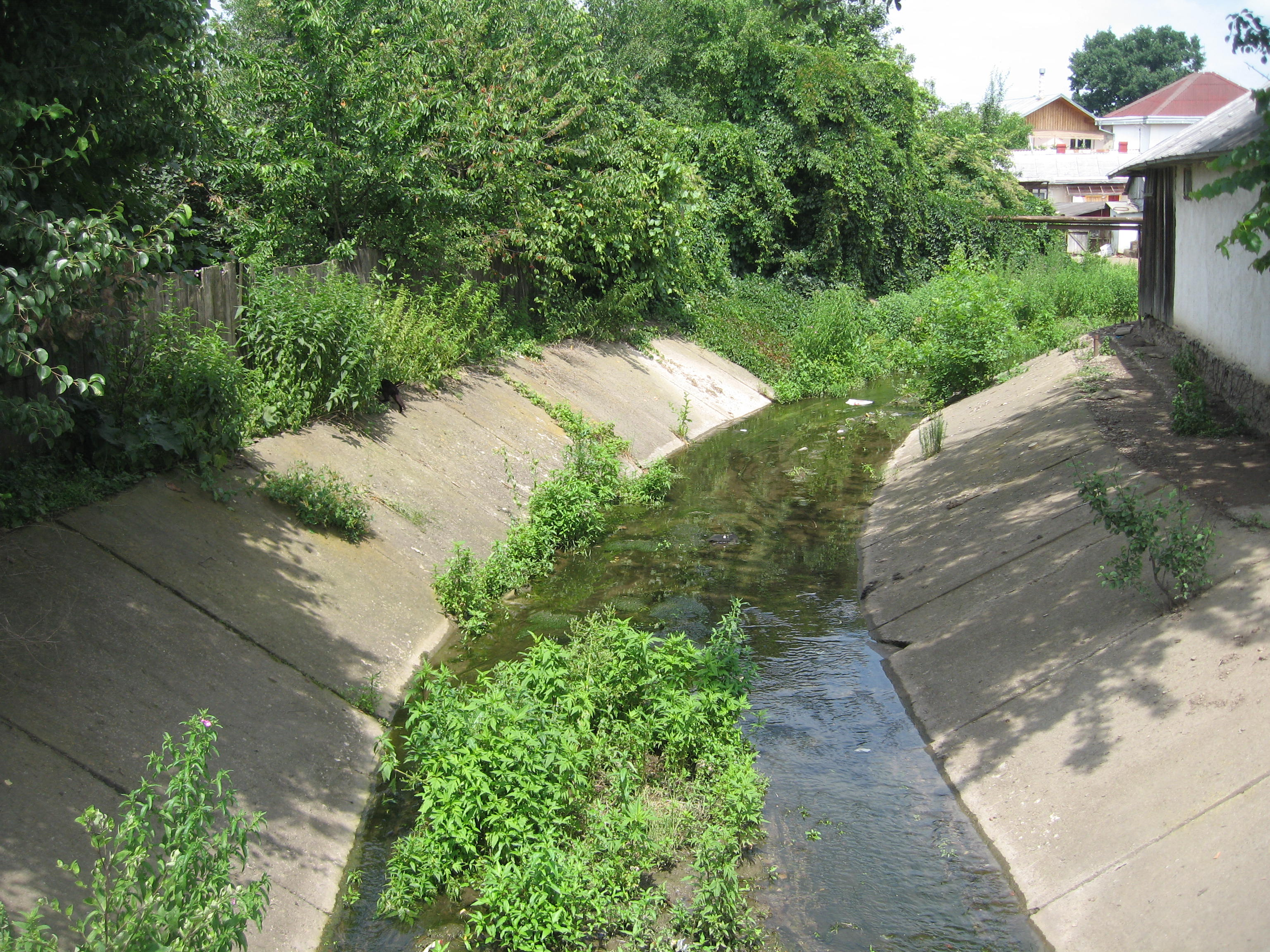
Dragomirna River in Ițcani

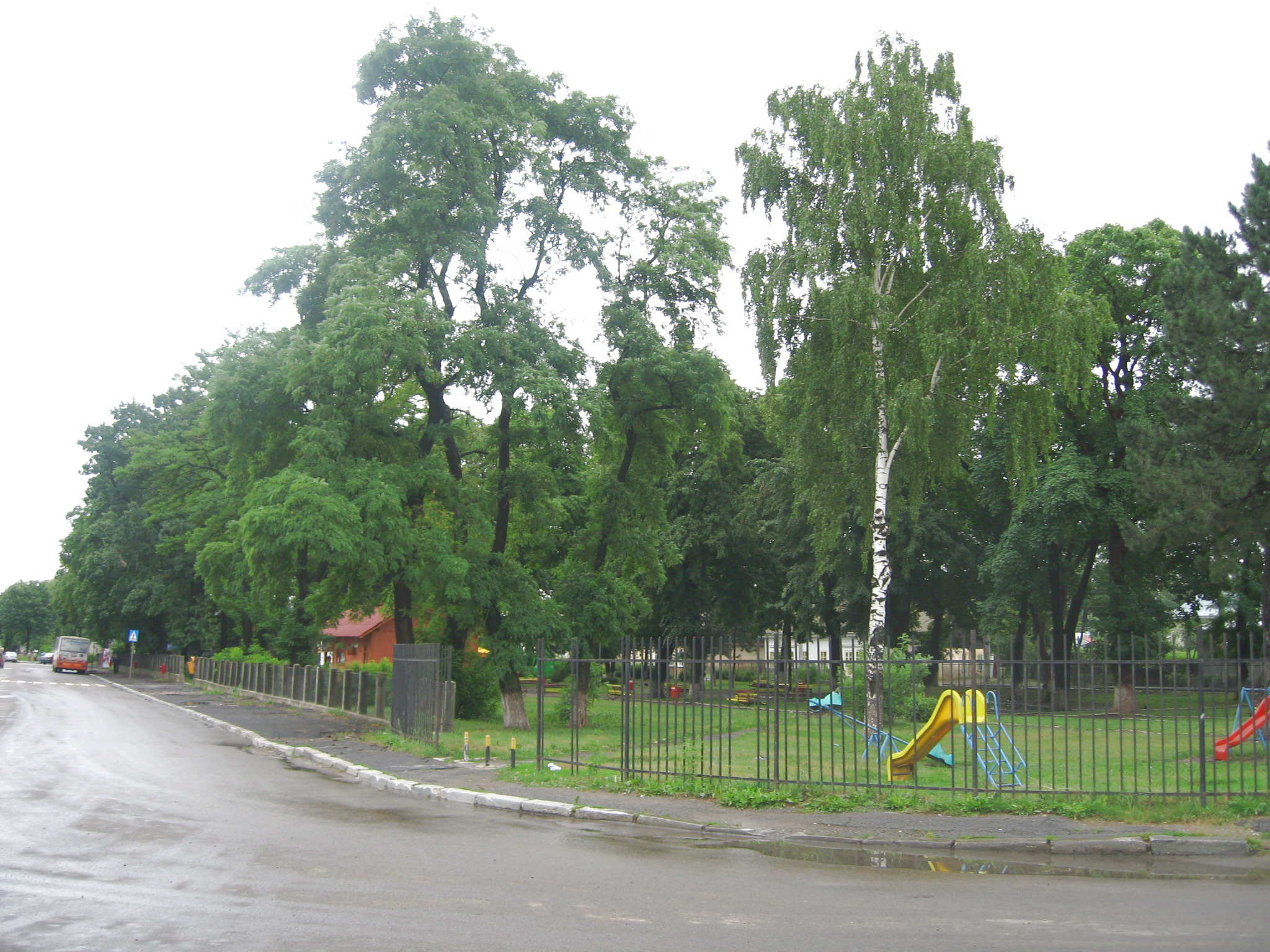
Railway station park in Ițcani

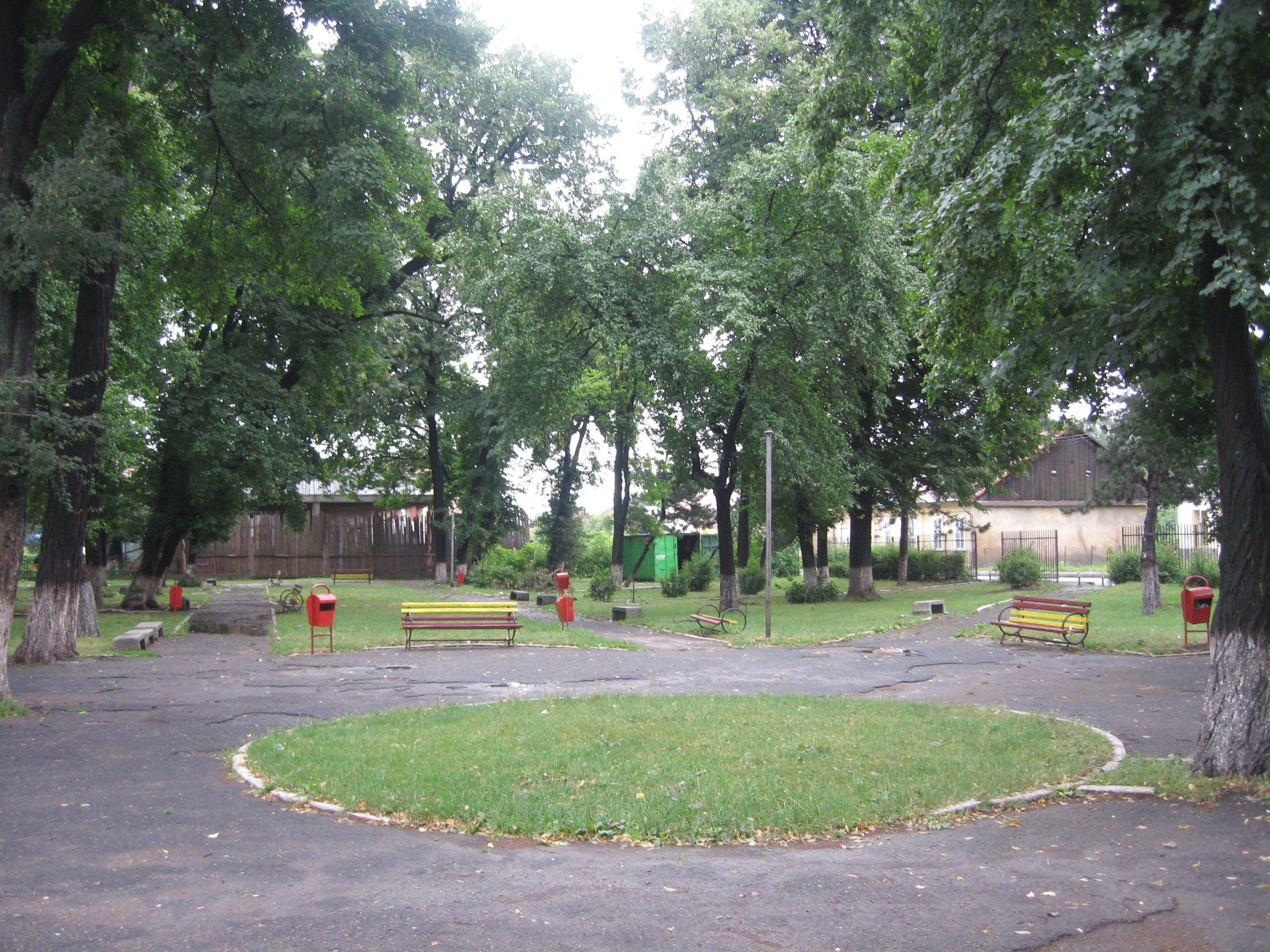
Railway station park in Ițcani
