= Suceava railway station =

Heritage site in Suceava County, Romania

Suceava
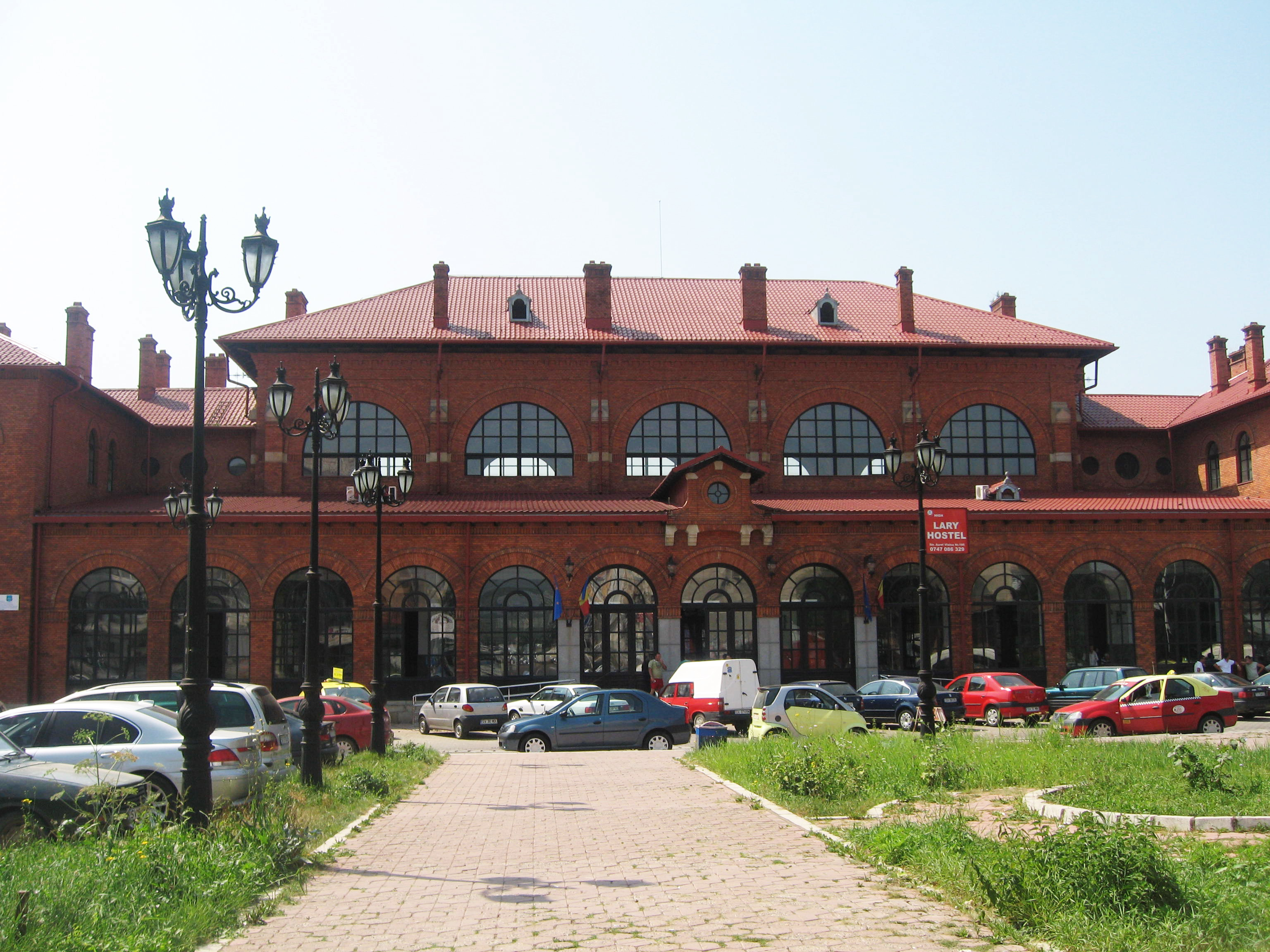
- View of the station building

General information
- Location: Suceava, Romania
- Coordinates: 47°40′14″N 26°15′58″E
- Owner: CFR

History
- Opened: 1902
- Electrified: 1981

Services
Preceding station	CFR	Following station
Suceava North towards Suceava	CFR Intercity 500	Pașcani towards București Nord
Location

Suceava railway station (Romanian: Gara Suceava), also known as Burdujeni, is a railway station located in Suceava, Romania, completed in 1902. Originally part of Burdujeni village (now a suburb of Suceava), it is located at No. 7, Nicolae Iorga Street. The railway station was included on the 2004 list of historical monuments in Suceava County.

Suceava railway station was built between 1892 and 1902. Between 1902 and 1918 it was a train station at the Austro-Hungarian border, on the Romanian side. The historic building of Burdujeni railway station has baroque influences and it was designed in the architectural style of Fribourg/Freiburg railway station, located in Switzerland.

The train station was closed between 2000 and 2006, due to rehabilitation works carried out. Meanwhile, rail traffic was redirected to Suceava North railway station.

== See also ==
- Suceava North railway station
