= Brăila railway station =

Railway station of Brăila, Romania

Brăila
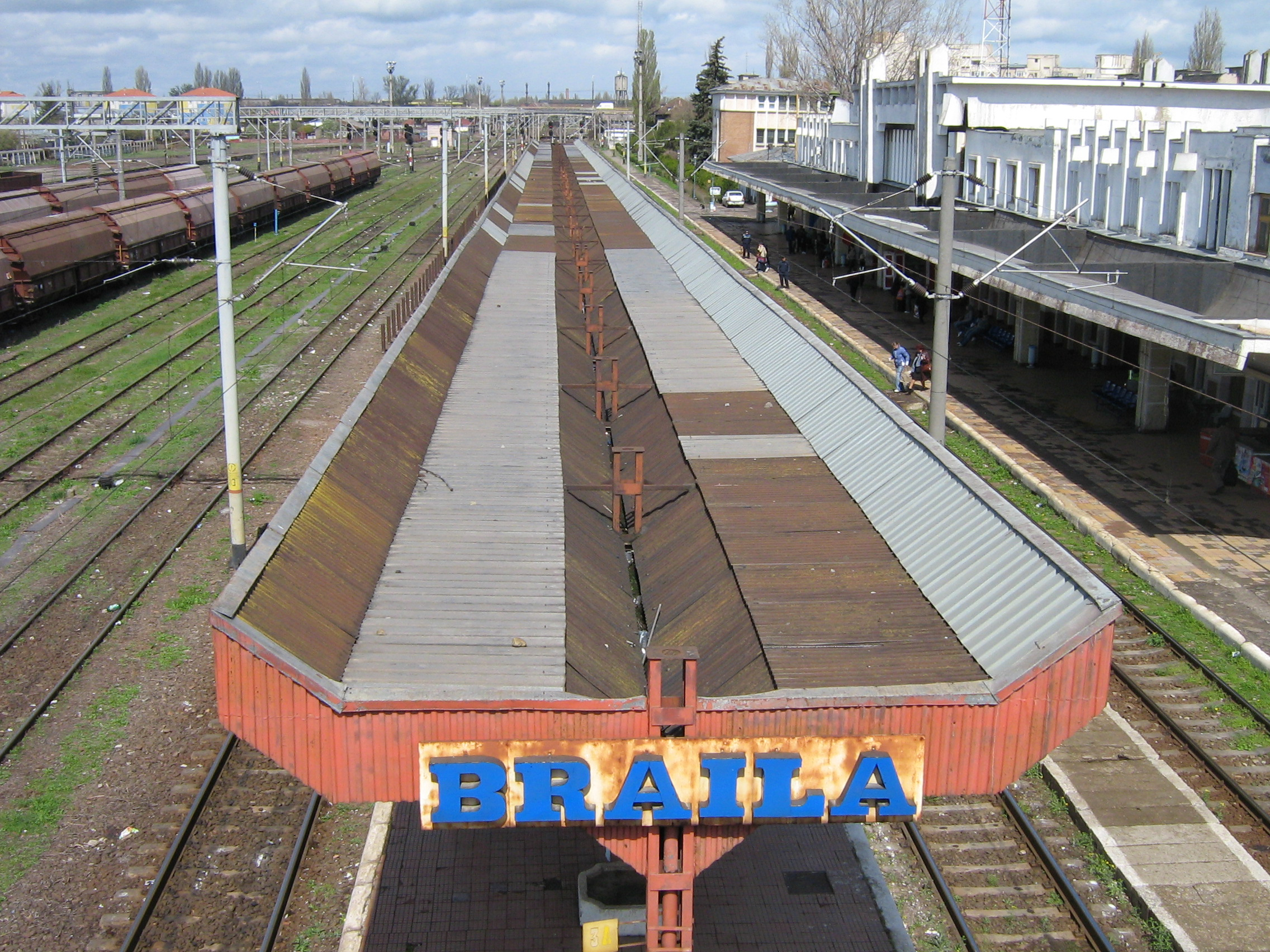
- Image of the station

General information
- Location: Brăila, Romania
- Coordinates: 45°16′53.1″N 27°57′21.6″E
- Owner: CFR
Location

The Brăila railway station is the only railway station in Brăila, Romania. The station was built in 1869 by the Prussian company Strussberg, which did so in the model of those in Prussia. It was formally opened in September 1872 and gave Brăila more commercial and economic importance. On 6 May 1877, as the Romanian War of Independence was taking place, four monitors of the Ottoman Empire shelled the city, including its station. It was again shelled by the Soviet Air Forces on 5 July 1941 during World War II, a bombardment from which the station would not recover until 1970.
