= Suceava North railway station =

Railway station in Suceava County, Romania

Suceava Nord
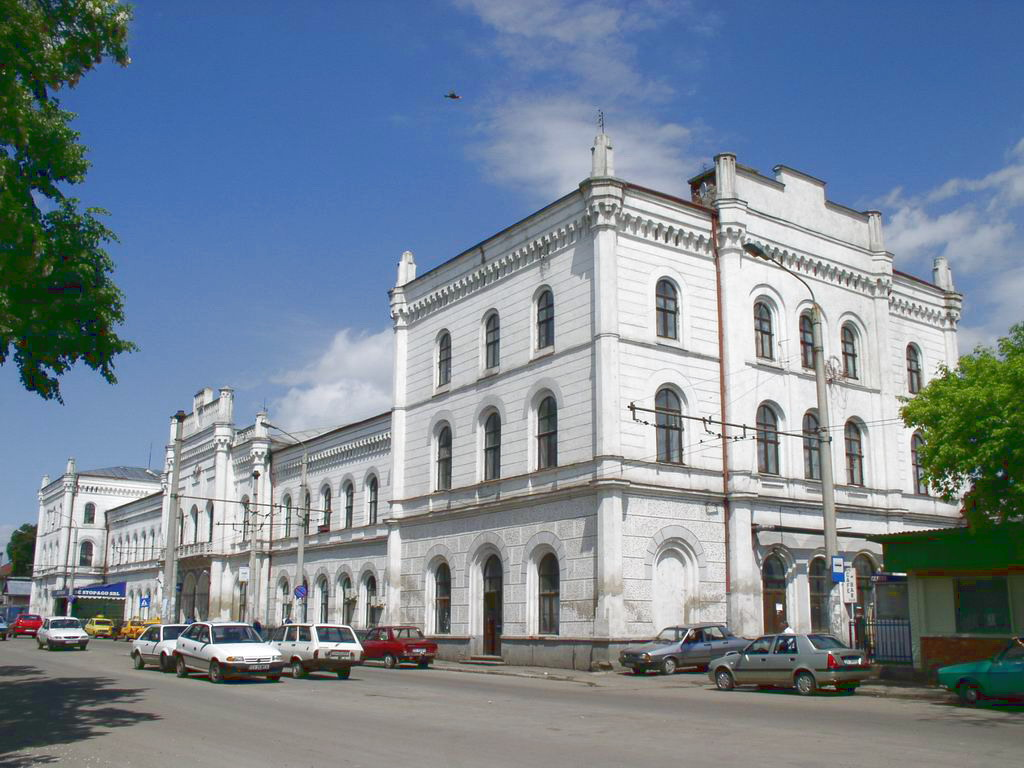
- View of the station building

General information
- Location: Strada Gării, Nr. 4, Suceava, Romania
- Coordinates: 47°40′34.4208″N 26°14′8.75″E
- Owner: CFR

History
- Opened: 1871

Services
Preceding station	CFR	Following station
Terminus	CFR Intercity 500	Pașcani towards București Nord
Location

Suceava North railway station (Romanian: Gara Suceava Nord; German: Itzkany Bahnhof), also known as Ițcani, is a railway station located in Suceava, Romania, completed in 1871. Originally part of Ițcani village (now a suburb of Suceava), it is located at No. 4, Gării Street. The railway station was included on the 2004 list of historical monuments in Suceava County.

== History ==
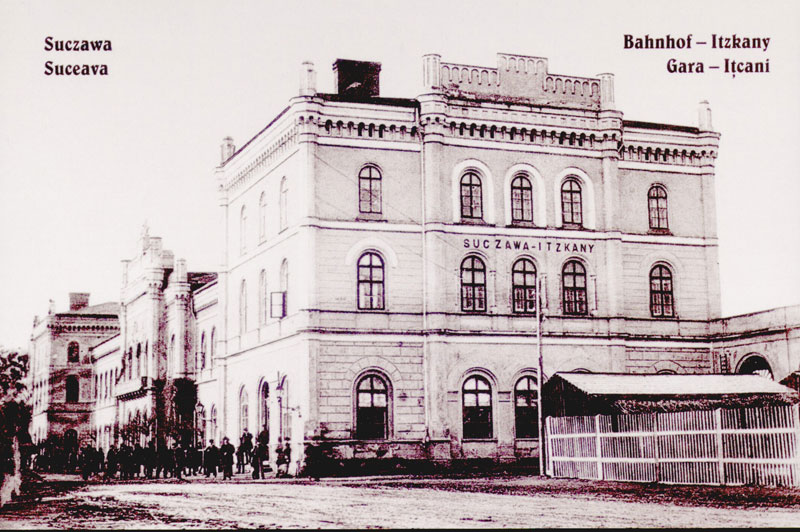
The station prior to 1918

Between 1870 and 1871, at a time when it was included in Austro-Hungarian Empire, Suceava was connected by a railway line through the Ițcani station to other important cities of Bukovina region, and through the Burdujeni station with the Kingdom of Romania. The Ițcani station building (now Suceava North) was raised by two Austrian entrepreneurs C. Gall and F. Ronchetti, builders of the Roman—Burdujeni—Ițcani—Chernowitz rail line, was commissioned in 1871. The station is a building with two levels, following the blueprint of other Austrian railway stations located in Central European areas, in neo-romantic style marked by a rectangular plane, ogive-arched vaults, broken-key arcs and arches and battlements and corner towers in Gothic Revival style.

Until 1918, when Bukovina was joined with Romania, the station served as an important railway hub for passenger traffic and cargo transit within both Austria–Hungary and Romania. It was the border point between Romania and Austria-Hungary on the Cisleithanian side, while in Romania the corresponding station was Suceava Station (Burdujeni). From 1881 until 1902, when modernization works were carried out at Burdujeni station (building of an upper floor and two side pavilions), Romania's government leased half of the Iţcani station from the Austrian authorities, to use as a customs station at the old frontier. In the same period a locomotive depot was built near the station that was one of the largest in Bukovina.

On September 11, 2007, the Ițcani station was chosen to be a filming site of a movie sequence from Gruber's Journey, directed by Radu Gabrea, which starred Romanian actors Florin Piersic Jr. and Claudiu Bleonț, as well as German actor Udo Schenk. The railway station was chosen to appear in the film because its architecture was reminiscent of the period of World War II. By 2009 however, the building had reportedly fallen into neglect, and health inspectors fined the local Romanian Railways authority 1,000 lei for allowing refuse to pile up on the grounds.

== See also ==
- Suceava railway station
