= Craiova railway station =

Railway station in Craiova, Romania

Craiova
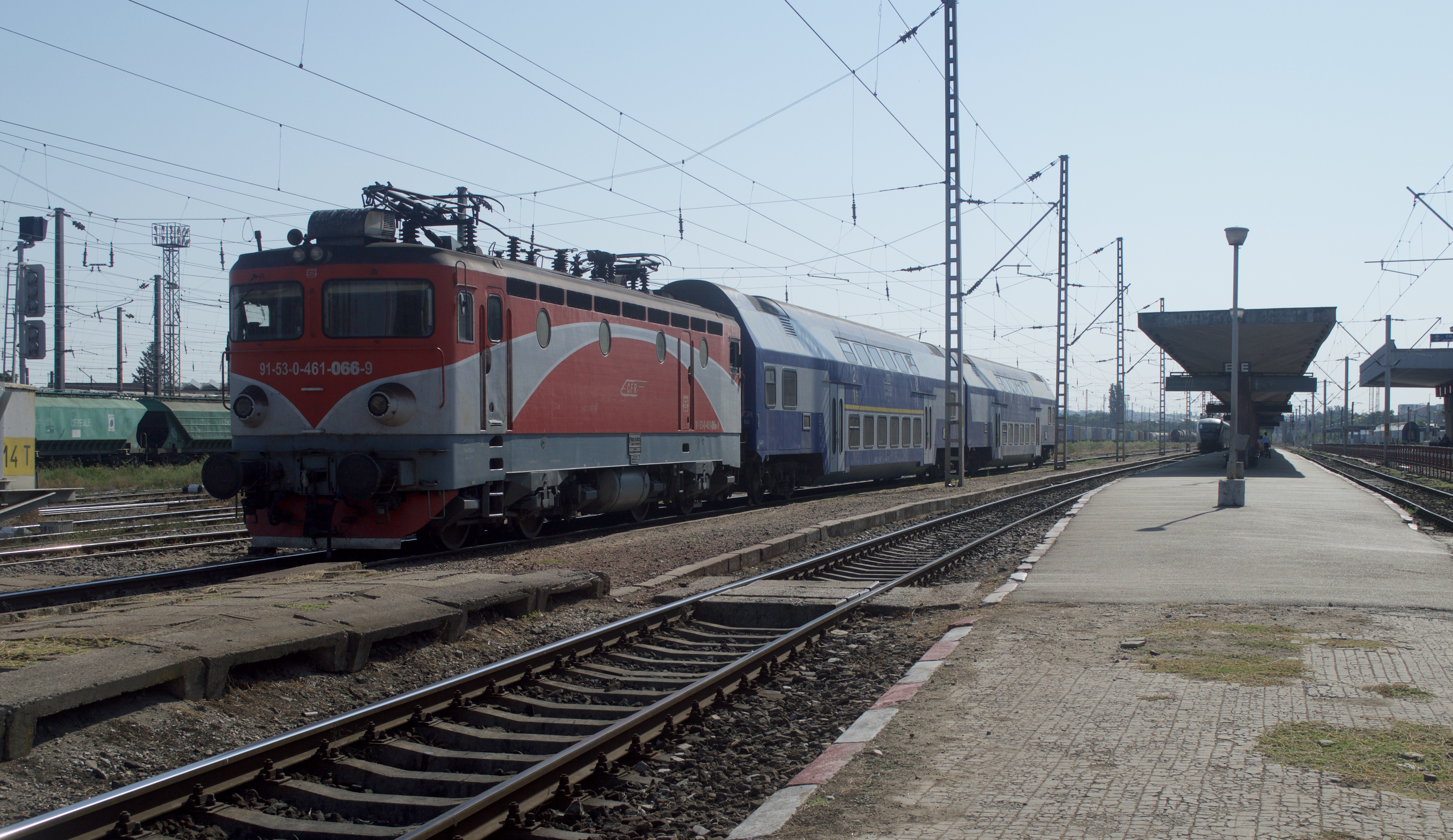
- View of the platforms

General information
- Location: Craiova, Romania
- Coordinates: 44°19′43.302″N 23°48′58.50″E
- Owner: CFR

History
- Opened: 1875
- Electrified: yes (1969)

Services
Preceding station	CFR	Following station
Filiași towards Timișoara Nord	CFR Intercity 900	Caracal towards București Nord
Location

Craiova railway station is an important terminus in the south of Romania and the main station in the region of Oltenia. The railway station was inaugurated in 1875.

This station is served by routes from the Bucharest, Transylvania, Banat and Constanţa and international routes from Budapest, Belgrade, Vienna, Munich and Varna. As of 2008 more than 120 passenger trains are served by the station.

== Services ==
- Bucharest - Roşiorii de Vede - Craiova - Drobeta Turnu Severin - Caransebeş - Timişoara Nord
- Craiova - Piteşti - Craiova
- Craiova - Filiaşi - Târgu Jiu - Petroşani - Simeria
- Craiova - Calafat
- Craiova - Motru
- Craiova - Calafat (Golenți)- New Europe Bridge - Vidin - Sofia
- Craiova - Poiana Mare
