= Via Terra =

Private railway company in Romania

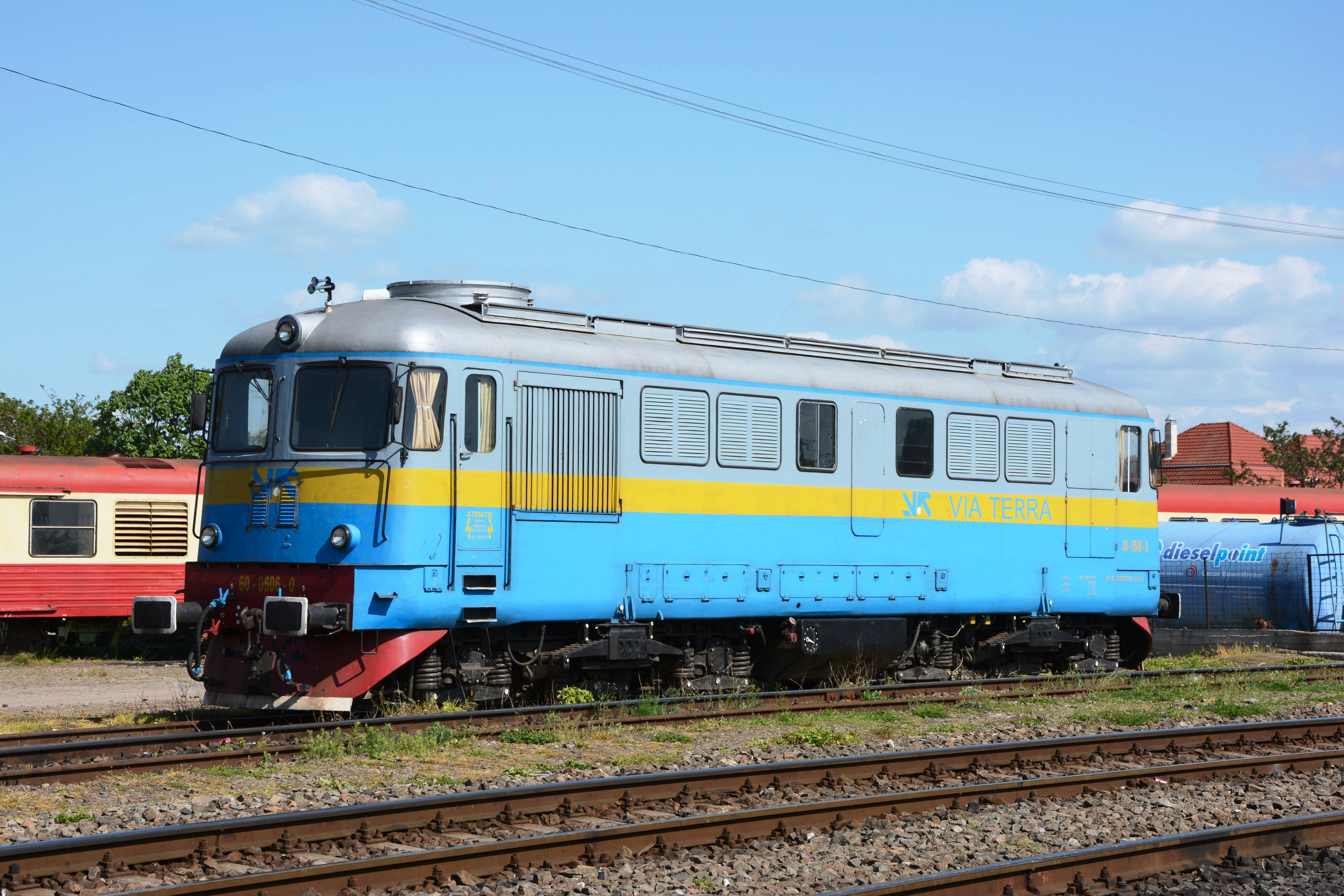
Locomotive of Via Terra Group in Marghita

Via Terra Group (formerly Via Terra Spedition) is a private railway company in Romania. It began activity in 2001 with freight transport and expanded into passenger services in 2009.

== Passenger transport ==
Passenger trains are run by Via Terra's branch InterRegional Calatori. Rolling stock is made up mostly of former DeutchBahn Class 628 DMUs. They operate several routes:

- Bistrița – Bistrița Bârgăului
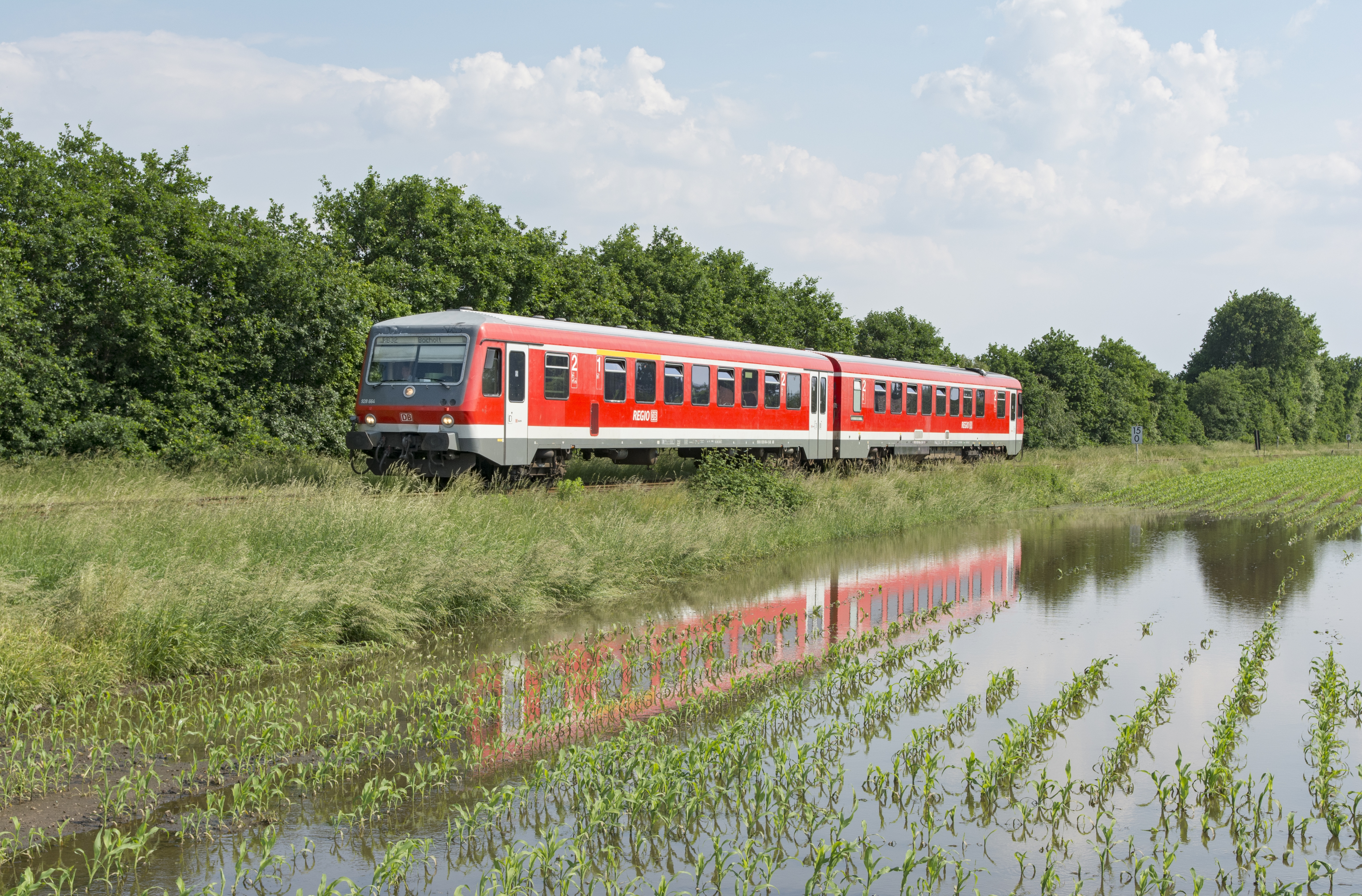
- DeutchBahn Class 628 DMU (Main type of locomotive operated by InterRegional Calatori)
  Bistrița – Cluj-Napoca
- Oradea – Salonta – Vașcău
- Oradea – Marghita – Sărmășag
- Oradea – Cheresig
