= List of railway stations in Romania =

Below is the list of railway stations in Romania. Although there are hundreds of stations only those stations which can be linked to articles in Wikipedia are shown.

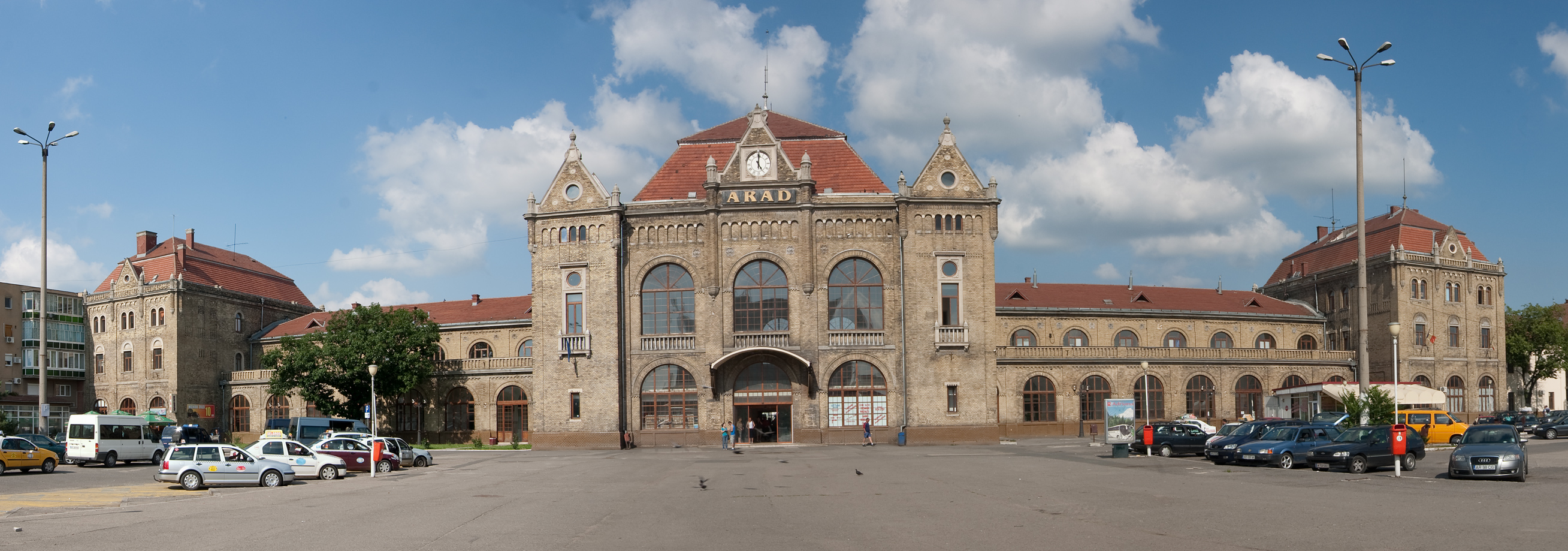
Arad Central railway station

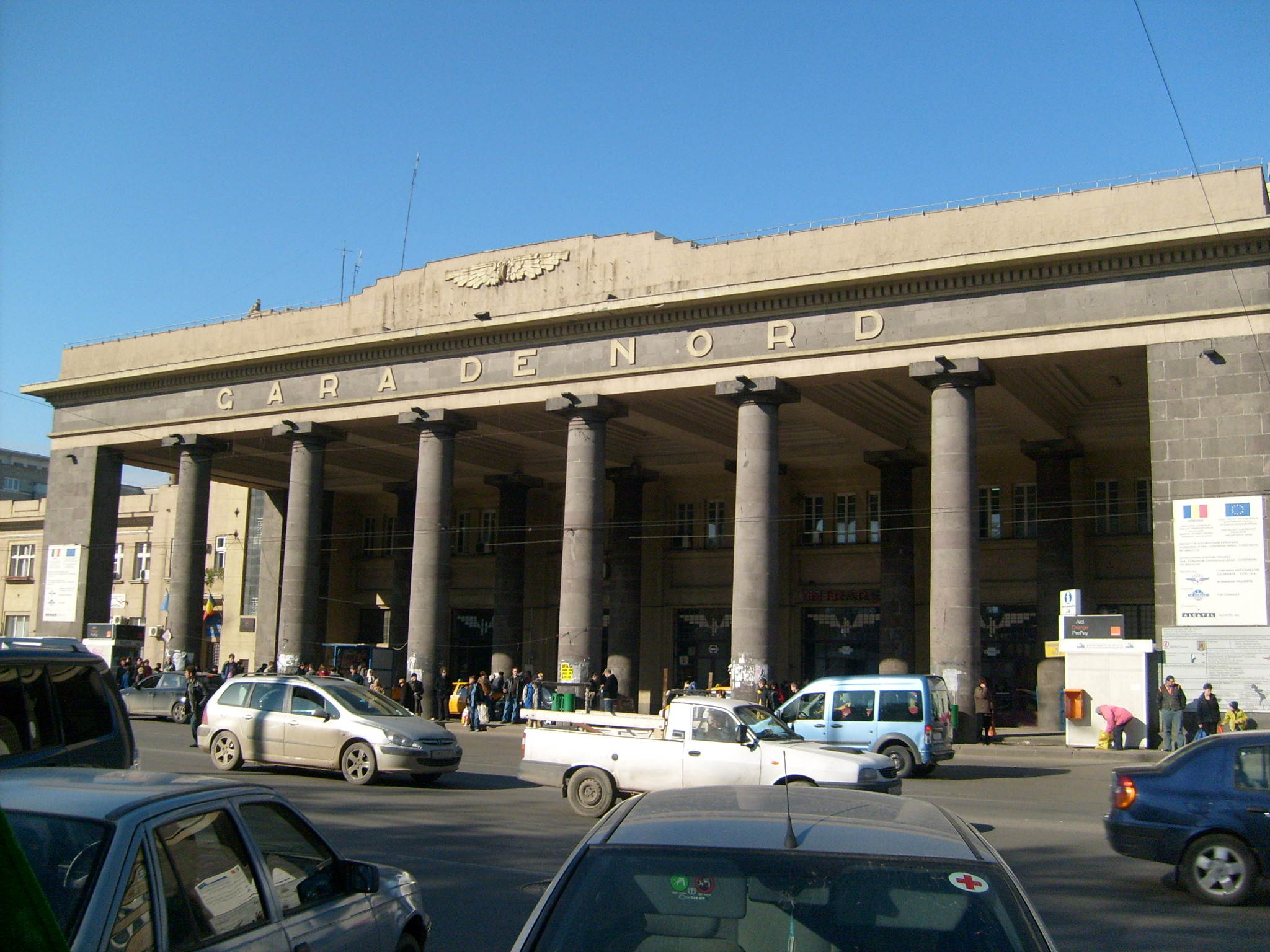
Bucharest North railway station (Gara de Nord)

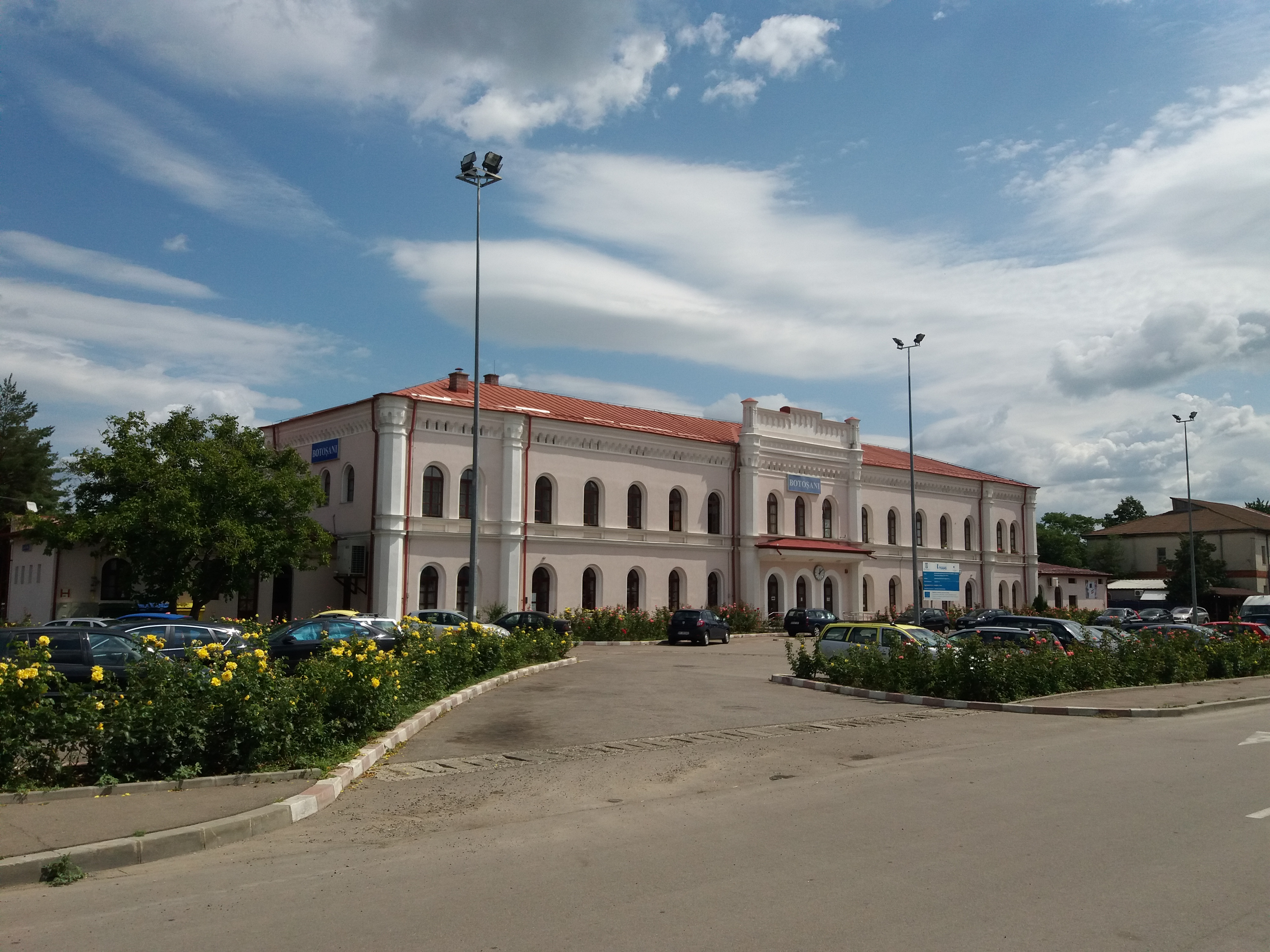
Botoșani railway station (Gara Botoșani)

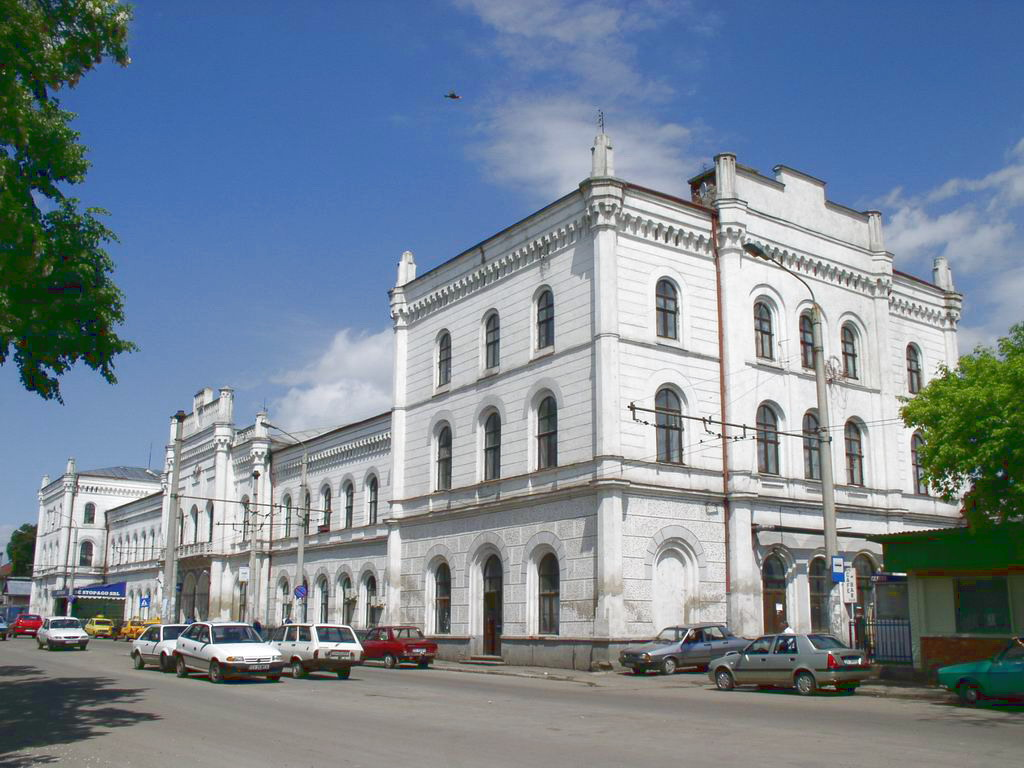
Suceava Nord railway station (Gara Suceava Nord)

Station	County
Agnita railway station	Sibiu County
Alțâna railway station	Sibiu County
Arad Central railway station	Arad County
Bacău railway station	Bacău County
Bartolomeu railway station	Brașov County
Basarab railway station	Bucharest
Băneasa railway station	Bucharest
Benești railway station	Sibiu County
Brad railway station	Hunedoara County
Brașov railway station	Brașov County
Brăila railway station	Brăila County
Bucharest North railway station	Bucharest
Bolovani railway station	Sibiu County
Cașolț railway station	Sibiu County
Cluj-Napoca railway station	Cluj County
Constanța railway station	Constanța County
Cornățel railway station	Sibiu County
Coveș railway station	Sibiu County
Craiova railway station	Dolj County
Galați railway station	Galați County
Giurgiu railway station	Giurgiu County
Hosman railway station	Sibiu County
Iași railway station	Iași County
Nocrich railway station	Sibiu County
Roșia railway station	Sibiu County
Satu Mare railway station	Satu Mare County
Sibiu railway station	Sibiu County
Sinaia railway station	Prahova County
Suceava North railway station	Suceava County
Suceava railway station	Suceava County
Țichindeal railway station	Sibiu County
Timișoara East railway station	Timiș County
Timișoara North railway station	Timiș County
Timișoara South railway station	Timiș County
Timișoara West railway station	Timiș County
Titan Sud	Bucharest
Valea Vișeului railway station	Maramureș County
Vărd railway station	Sibiu County
Vicșani railway station	Suceava County
Vurpăr railway station	Sibiu County
