= Ghijasa =

Ghijasa may refer to one of two places in Sibiu County, Romania:

- Ghijasa de Jos, a village in Nocrich Commune
- Ghijasa de Sus, a village in Alțâna Commune
