= Veseud =

Veseud may refer to several villages in Romania:

- Veseud, a village in Chirpăr Commune, Sibiu County
- Veseud, a village in Slimnic Commune, Sibiu County
