= Vurpăr branch line =

Railway line in Romania

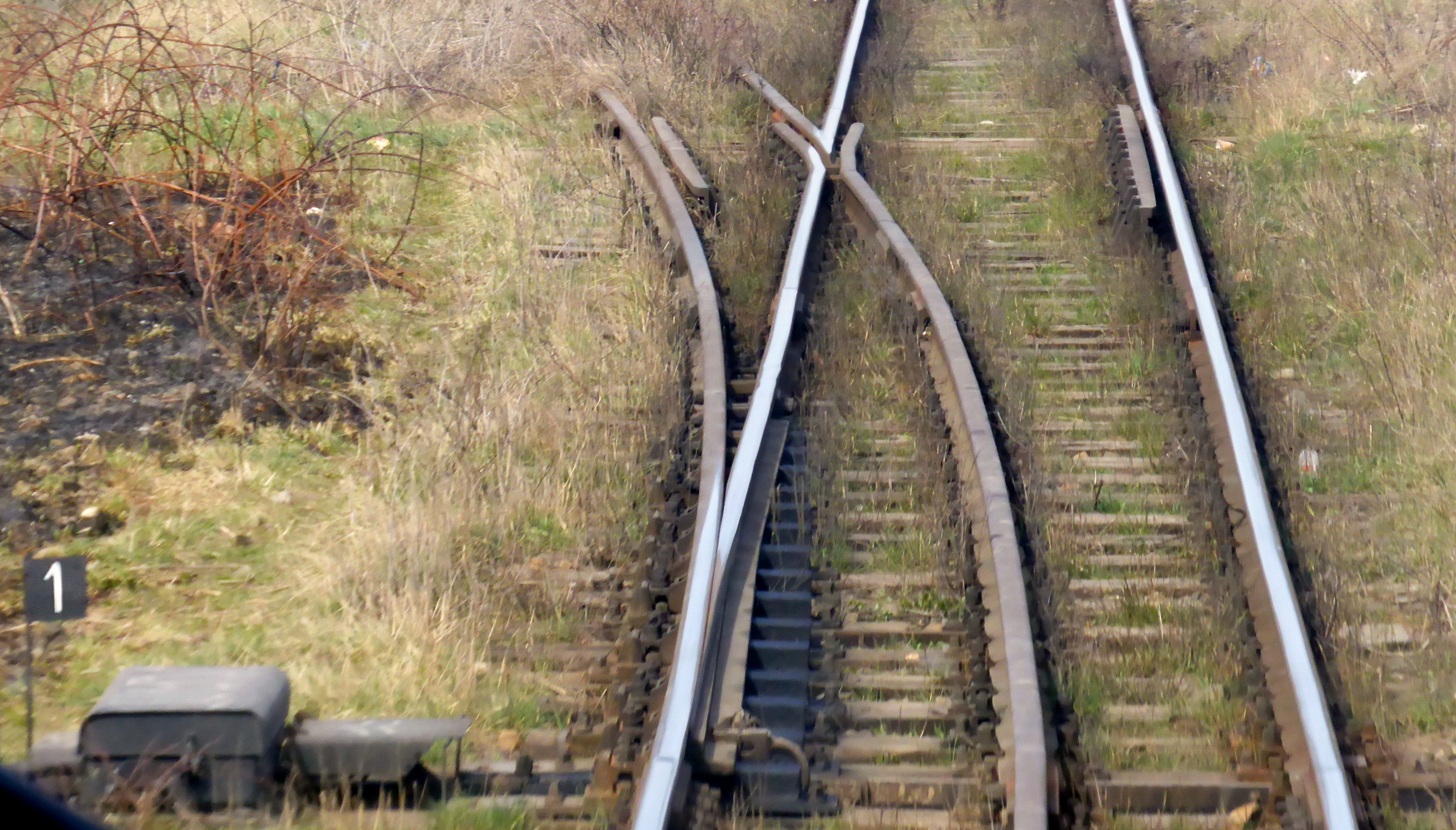
- The Agnita line joining the mainline.

Overview
- Status: Closed
- Owner: CFR Infrastructură
- Locale: Sibiu County, Romania
- Termini: Cornăţel; Vurpăr
- Stations: 2

Service
- Type: Narrow-gauge
- System: Căile Ferate Române
- Operator(s): CFR Călători

History
- Opened: 1910
- Closed: 1993

Technical
- Line length: 12.45 km (7.74 mi)
- Number of tracks: 1
- Character: Rural Branch line

The Vurpăr branch line was a narrow-gauge rail line Sibiu County, Romania. Originally it stretched from Cornăţel on the Agnita railway line to the terminus in Vurpăr. CFR classed the line, along with the Agnita railway line, as line 204 in the last years of operation. The Sibiu Steam Locomotives Museum holds locomotives used on the lines.

== History ==
The line was originally opened by the Sighisoara - Sibiu Local Railways Company in 1910. As the line originally lay within Hungary, the Hungarian State Railways operated services until 1919 (when Transylvania became part of Romania). CFR then continued to operate services until closure in 1993.

== Reopening ==
Societatea Feroviară de Turism (SFT) originally planned to reopen the line as a tourist route but plans where shelved in 2006. After threats from CFR Infrastructură that track would be lifted all the rail infrastructure became protected as a historic monument in 2008. Currently there is an active project called Asociația Prietenii Mocăniței ("Friends of the Narrow-gauge railway") and aimed at restoring the line for tourist operation along with the Agnita railway line.

== Bibliography ==
- Lacriţeanu, Șerban (1995). "The Narrow Gauge Lines of the Romanian State Railway (CFR)". In Keith Chester (ed.). East European narrow gauge. Clevedon (UK): Channel View Publications. pp. 82–94. ISBN 1-873150-04-0.
- Engelbert, Paul (2011). Schmalspurig durch Ungarn II: die ehemals ungarischen Gebiete (in German). Malmö: Stenvalls. ISBN 978-91-7266-177-6.
