= Alțâna =

- Commune
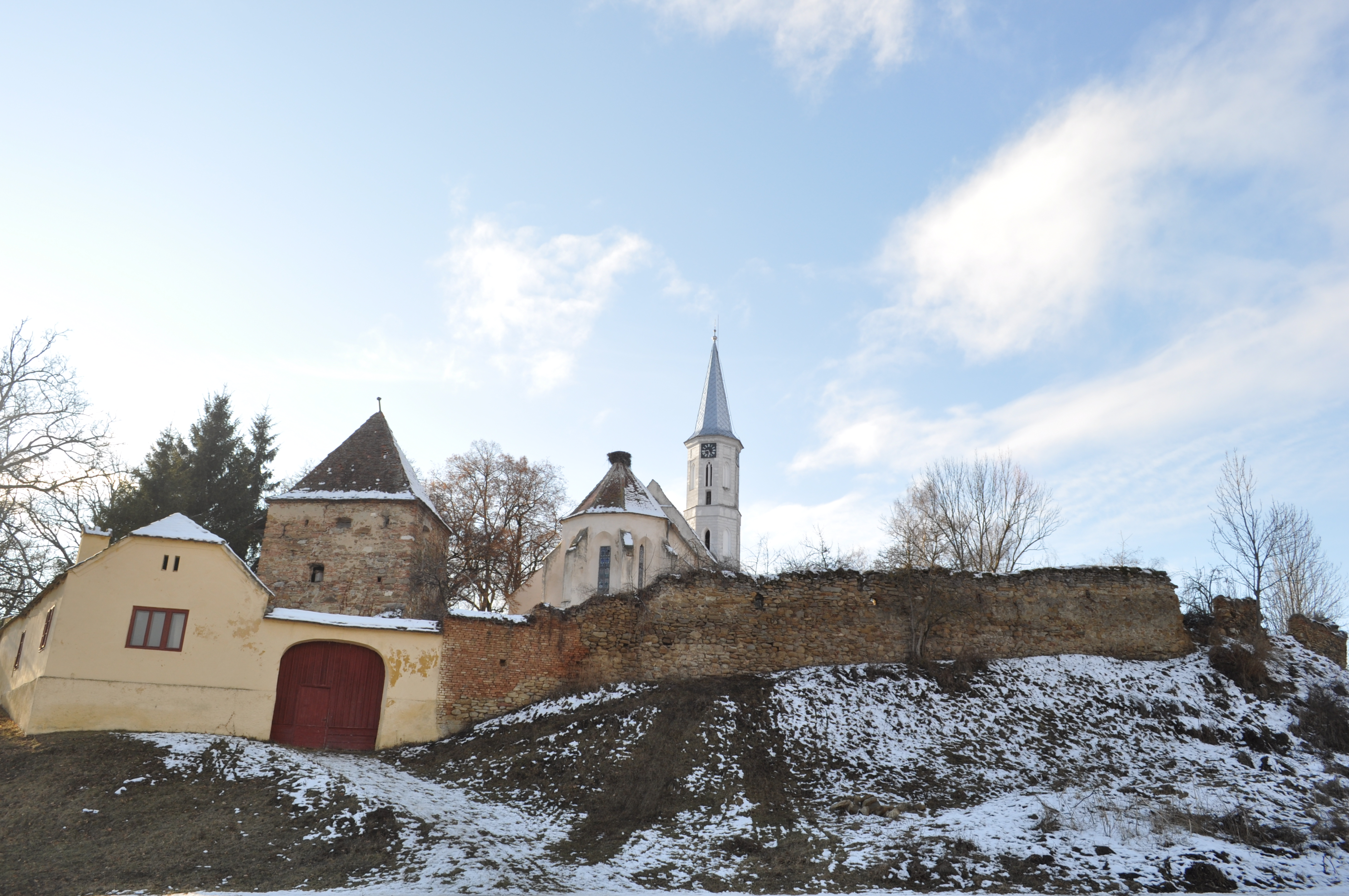
- Lutheran fortified church in Alțâna

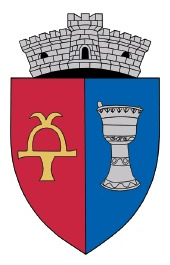
- Coat of arms

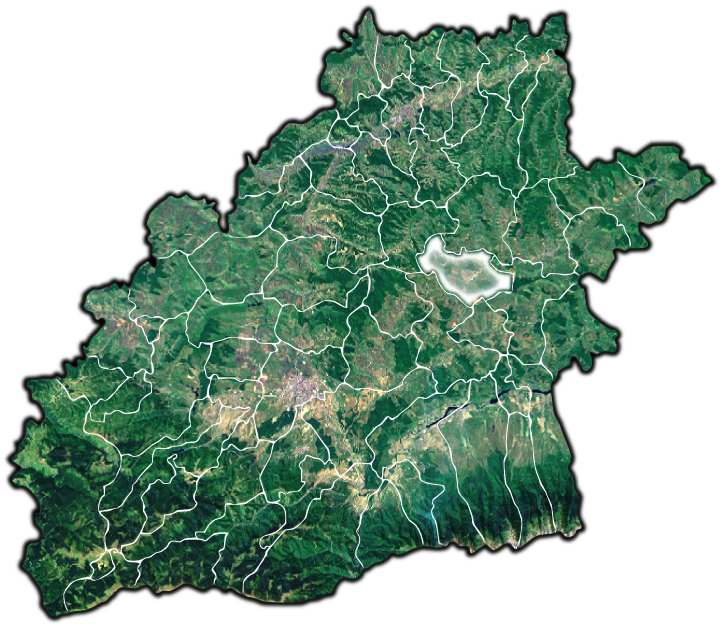
- Location in Sibiu County

- Location in Romania
- Coordinates: 45°55′41″N 24°27′44″E
- Country: Romania
- County: Sibiu
- Established: 1291 (first official record)

Government
  - Mayor (2020–2024): Ioan Bucșă (PSD)
- Area: 80.19 km^{2} (30.96 sq mi)
- Elevation: 448 m (1,470 ft)
- Population (2021-12-01): 1,533
  - Density: 19.12/km^{2} (49.51/sq mi)
- Time zone: UTC+02:00 (EET)
  - Summer (DST): UTC+03:00 (EEST)
- Postal code: 557005
- Area code: (+40) 02 69
- Vehicle reg.: SB
- Website: primariaaltina.ro

Alțâna (German: Alzen; Hungarian: Alcina) is a commune in the north of Sibiu County, Romania, in the historical region of Transylvania. It is composed of three villages: Alțâna, Benești (Bägendorf; Bendorf), and Ghijasa de Sus (Obergesäß; Felsőgezés).

== Geography ==
The commune lies on the Transylvanian Plateau, on the banks of the Hârtibaciu River and its right tributary, the river Zlagna. It is located in the central part of the county, 36 km (22 mi) northeast of the county seat, Sibiu, to which it is connected by county road DJ106.

== History ==
Alțâna was one of the most important villages of the Transylvanian Saxon seat of Nocrich. There is an Evangelical Lutheran fortified church in the village; the Romanesque basilica dates to the 13th century.

In 1910 the Agnita to Sibiu railway line was completed, with stations at Alțâna and Benești; however, the line was closed in 2001. An active restoration group has since been formed aiming to restore the entire line to working condition.

=== Name ===
The legend says that the first German villagers were led by ten "greavi". These ten men counseled in the matter of how should they name the settlement and each of them wanted to use their name. In the end, they decided to name it Alzen, which means "all ten".

Historical population
Year	Pop.	±%
1850	3,246	—
1880	3,097	−4.6%
1900	3,462	+11.8%
1920	3,729	+7.7%
1941	3,922	+5.2%
1977	2,622	−33.1%
1992	1,782	−32.0%
2002	1,616	−9.3%
2011	1,562	−3.3%
2022	1,533	−1.9%
Source: Official Austro-Hungarian and Romanian census data

=== Natives ===
- Adolf Gottschling (1841–1918), a professor at the Brukenthal College in Sibiu and one of the pioneers of meteorology in Transylvania.
