= Roșia, Sibiu =

Roșia
- Commune
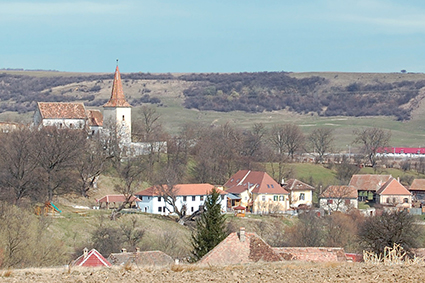
- The village of Daia and its fortified church

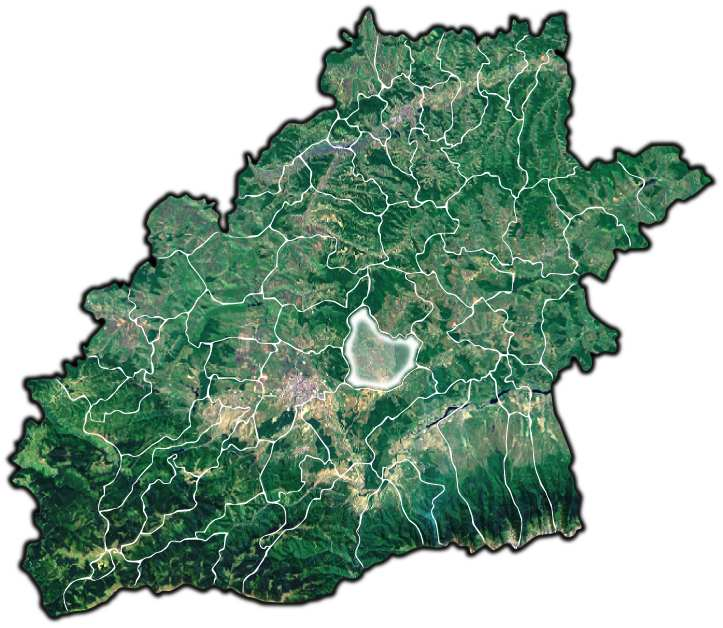
- Location in Sibiu County

- Location in Romania
- Coordinates: 45.8167°N 24.3111°E
- Country: Romania
- County: Sibiu

Government
  - Mayor (2020–2024): Ioan David (PMP)
- Area: 112.59 km^{2} (43.47 sq mi)
- Population (2021-12-01): 6,074
  - Density: 53.95/km^{2} (139.7/sq mi)
- Time zone: UTC+02:00 (EET)
  - Summer (DST): UTC+03:00 (EEST)
- Postal code: 557210
- Vehicle reg.: SB
- Website: primariarosia-sb.ro

Roșia (German: Rothberg; Hungarian: Veresmart) is a commune located in Sibiu County, Transylvania, Romania. It is composed of six villages: Cașolț (Kastenholz; Hermány), Cornățel (Harbachdorf; Hortobágyfalva), Daia (formerly Daia Săsească; Thalheim; Dolmány), Nou (Neudorf; Szászújfalu), Nucet (Johannisberg; Szentjánoshegy), and Roșia.

The commune is located in the central part of Sibiu County, 18 km (11 mi) east of the county seat, Sibiu. It lies on the Transylvanian Plateau, on the banks of the Hârtibaciu River; the river Zăvoi flows into the Hârtibaciu in Cornățel village.

Roșia village is the site of Roșia fortified church.

== History ==
In 1910, the Agnita to Sibiu railway line was completed, with stations at Roșia, Cașolț, and Cornățel; the line was closed in 2001. An active restoration group has since been formed aiming to restore the entire line to working condition.

== Natives ==
- Ion Gorun (1863–1928), prose writer, poet, and translator
