= Vurpăr railway station =

Railway station in Sibiu County, Romania

General information
- Location: Romania
- Coordinates: 45°52′N 24°14′E
- Owner: CFR Infrastructură
- Line: Vurpăr branch line
- Platforms: 1
- Tracks: 1

History
- Opened: 1910
- Closed: 1993
Location

Vurpăr railway station was the terminus of the Vurpăr branch line of the Agnita railway line in Vurpăr, Sibiu County Romania. The station still exists along with the track which has been protected.

== History ==
The station was built by the Hungarian State Railways in 1910 who operated it until 1919 when Transylvania became part of Romania. After a decline in usage across the whole line the route eventually closed in 1993.

== Future ==
Plans exist to reopen part of the line after it was protected in 2008. The local group Asociația Prietenii Mocăniței has taken on the task of restoring the route which has already restored a section of the line.

Preceding station	Disused railways	Following station
Roșia; Line and station closed	Vurpăr branch line	Terminus
