= Chirpăr =

- Commune
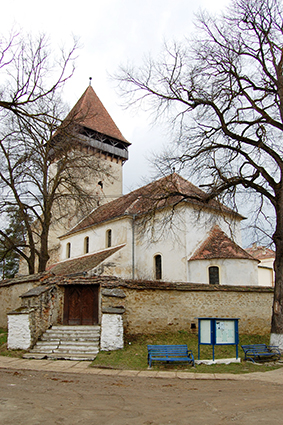
- Fortified church of Chirpăr

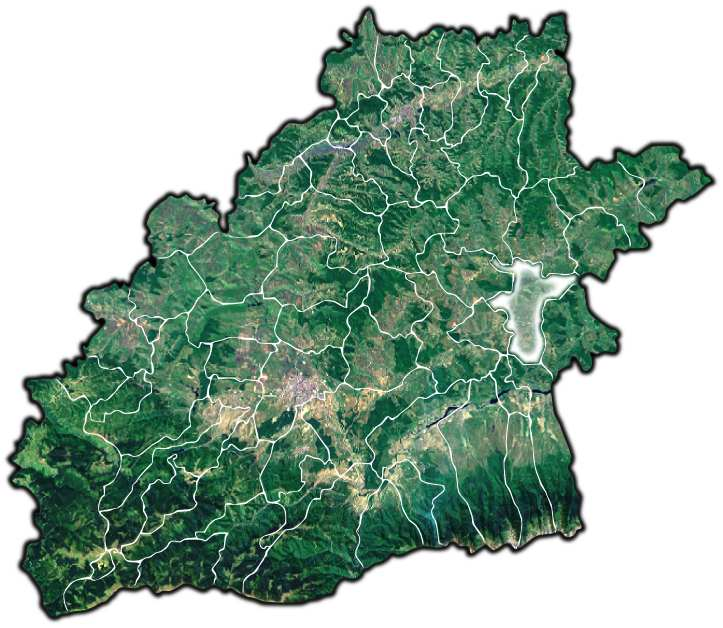
- Location in Sibiu County

- Location in Romania
- Coordinates: 45°54′N 24°36′E
- Country: Romania
- County: Sibiu

Government
  - Mayor (2020–2024): Eugen Feldeoiu (PSD)
- Area: 100.84 km^{2} (38.93 sq mi)
- Elevation: 480 m (1,570 ft)
- Population (2021-12-01): 1,489
  - Density: 14.77/km^{2} (38.24/sq mi)
- Time zone: UTC+02:00 (EET)
  - Summer (DST): UTC+03:00 (EEST)
- Postal code: 557075
- Area code: (+40) 0269
- Vehicle reg.: SB
- Website: chirpar.ro

Chirpăr (German: Kirchberg; Hungarian: Kürpöd) is a commune located in Sibiu County, Transylvania, Romania. It is composed of four villages: Chirpăr, Săsăuș (Sachsenhausen; Szászház), Vărd (Werd; Vérd) and Veseud (Zied; Vessződ). Chirpăr and Veseud villages have fortified churches.

The commune is situated in the eastern part of the county, 45.2 km (28.1 mi) east of the county seat, Sibiu, 14.2 km (8.8 mi) south of Agnita, and 47.9 km (29.8 mi) west of Făgăraș.

== Architecture ==
The village church was erected by the local Transylvanian Saxon community in the 12th century. It was initially built as a Romanesque basilica, made of stone.

== History ==
The Mongol invasion of 1241–1242 caused great damage to the area. The first attestation of the locality (under the name of Kirchberg) dates from 1332.

In 1910 the Agnita to Sibiu railway line was completed with at station at Vărd; however the line was closed in 2001. An active restoration group has since been formed aiming to restore the entire line to working condition.

== Natives ==
- Irina Petraș (born 1947), writer, literary critic, essayist, translator, and editor
