= Valea Vișeului railway station =

Railway station in Romania

Valea Vișeului
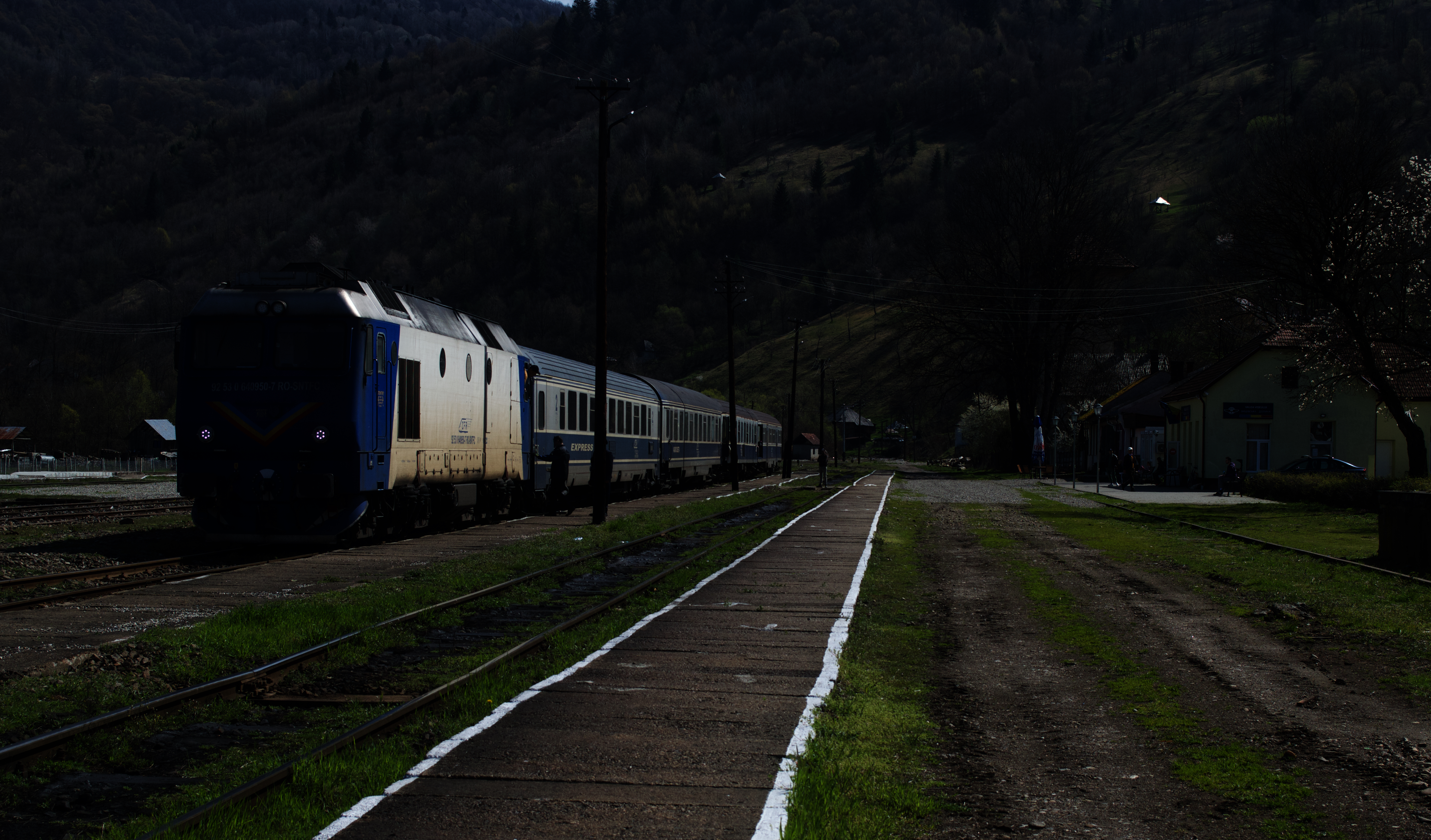

General information
- Coordinates: 47.90833333°N 24.1500°E
- Owner: CFR
Location

Valea Vișeului is a railway station near the town of Valea Vișeului in Bistra commune, Maramureș County of western Romania, close to the Ukraine border.

The station functions as the border control point on the line north from Romania to Dilove and Rakhiv in Ukraine. The rail line was reopened in January 2023 after a 17-year closure to provide extra rail capacity following the 2022 Russian invasion of Ukraine.

The station is on the Căile Ferate Române rail line Valea Vișeului–Borșa (ro). A dual-gauge section within Romania allows Ukrainian trains to run across the border on wide gauge on the Valea Vișeului—Berlibas (Kostîlivka / Костилівка) route.

== See also ==
- Rail transport in Romania
- List of railway stations in Romania
