= Iași railway station =

Railway station in Iași, Romania

Gara Mare Iași
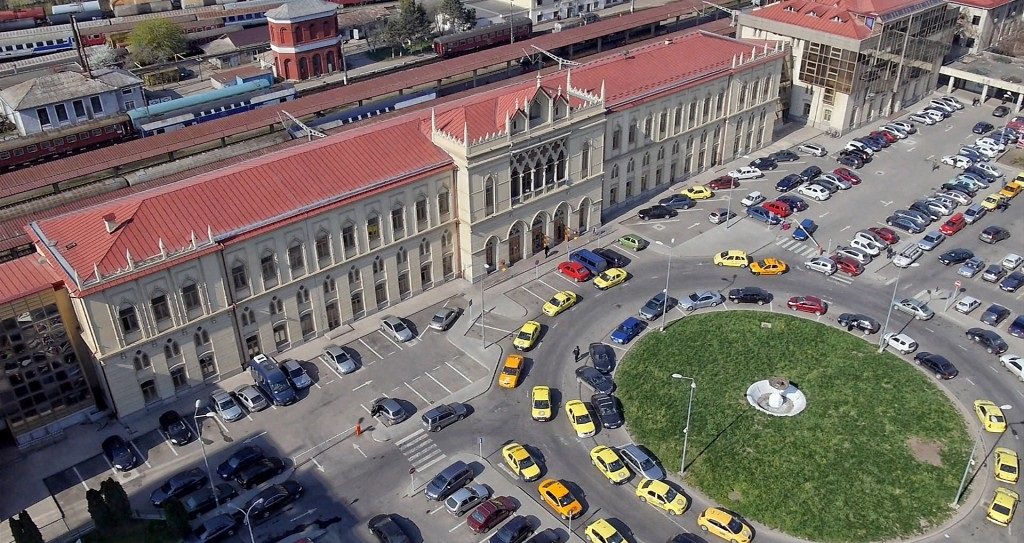
- The main entrance

General information
- Location: Piața Gării, Iași, Romania
- Coordinates: 47°09′56″N 27°34′11″E
- Owner: CFR
- Lines: Iași-Tecuci; Iași-Pașcani; Iași-Chișinău; Iași-Dorohoi; Iași-Hârlău
- Platforms: 5 (1 side platform, 4 island platforms)
- Tracks: 9 (covered)

Construction
- Structure type: At-grade
- Platform levels: 1
- Parking: Yes
- Architectural style: Venetian Gothic Revival

History
- Opened: 1 June [O.S. 20 May] 1870

Services
Preceding station	CFR	Following station
Nicolina International towards Ungheni	CFR Intercity 600	Nicolina (Iași) towards Mărășești
Lețcani towards Pașcani	CFR Intercity 606	Terminus

Other services
Preceding station	CFR	Following station
Lețcani towards Hârlău	CFR Intercity 607 operated by Regio Călători	Terminus
Lețcani towards Dorohoi	CFR Intercity 608 operated by Regio Călători	Terminus
Location
- Location within Romania Location within Europe

Iași railway station is the main railway station in Iași, and one of the oldest in Romania. It is part of the Pan-European Corridor IX.

== History ==
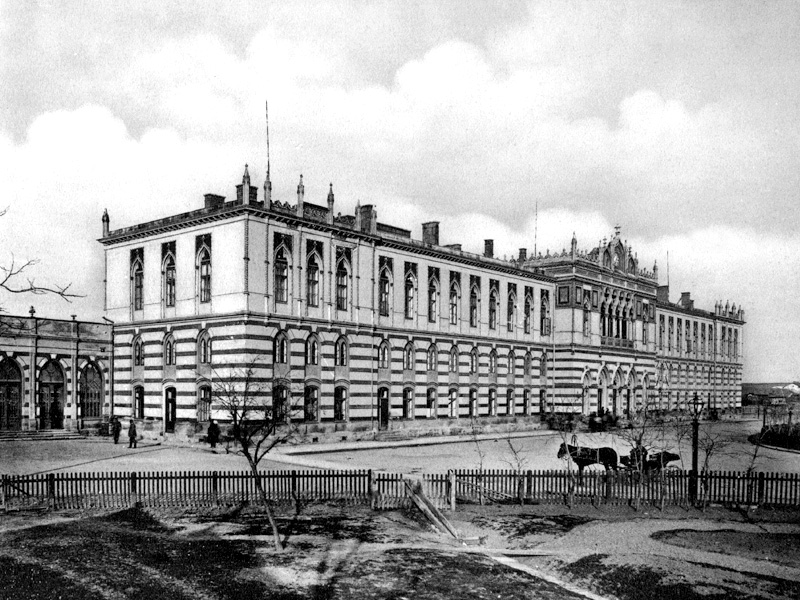
Iași railway station, circa 1900

Opened in 1870, the Grand Railway Station first connected Iași to Chernivtsi in Bukovina, Austria-Hungary and, after two years, to Bucharest.

The original building designed by Julian Oktawian Zachariewicz-Lwigród and inspired by the Doge's Palace of the Republic of Venice, is 133.8 metres (439 ft) long, has 113 rooms and is listed in the National Register of Historic Monuments.

In 1928-1930, two additional wings were symmetrically added to each side of the building. In 1980, a new separate building was constructed on the north side of the complex station and named Iași Nord.

The main buildings of the station have recently been restored with modern additions.-

== Current operations ==
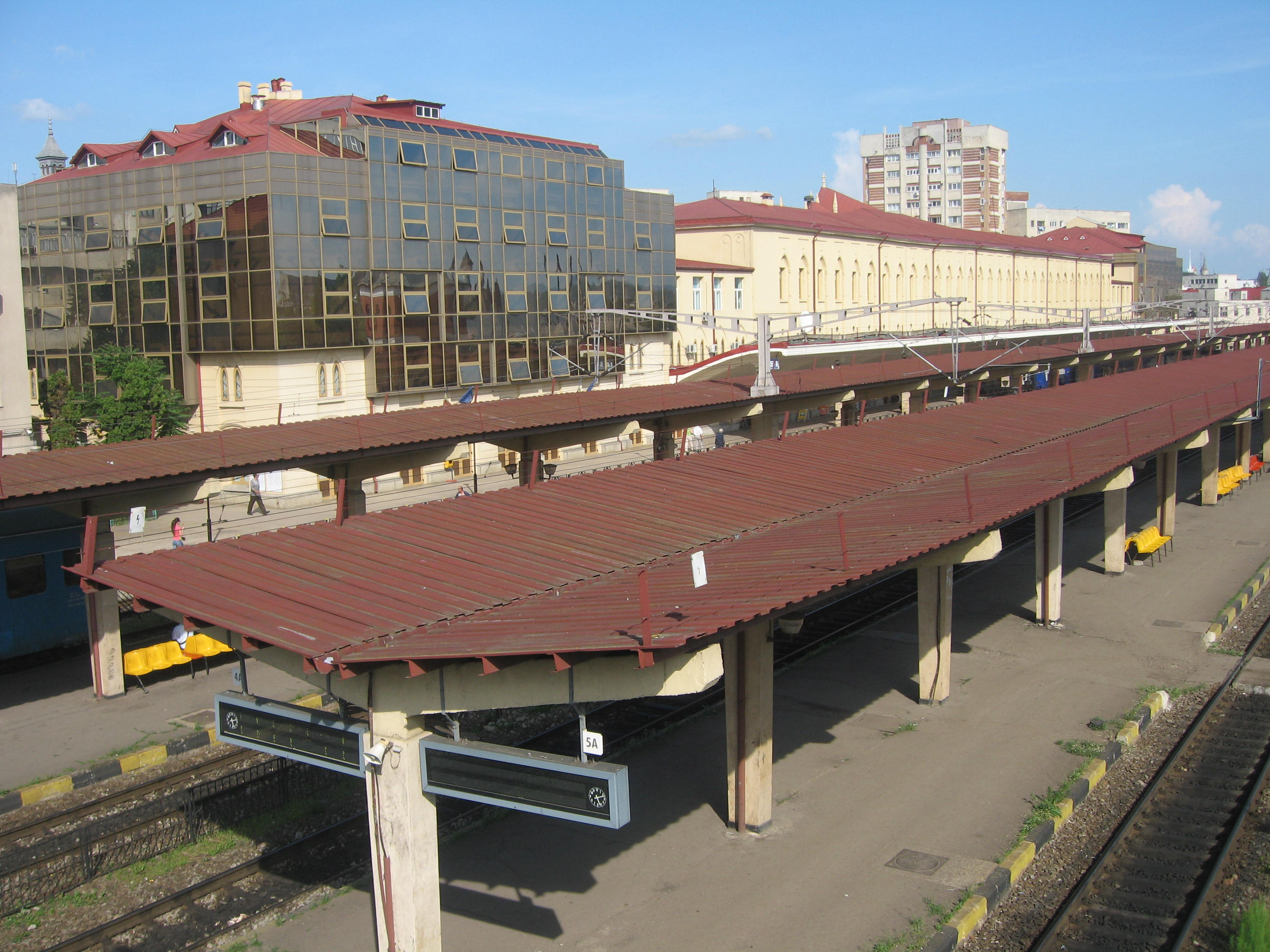
Inside the station

=== Passenger services ===
As of 2013, Iași railway station serves about 110 trains in a typical day, including domestic trains to and from a majority of Romanian cities. Additionally, international trains run to Chișinău and Ungheni, in the Republic of Moldova.

The main lines in Iași are Făurei – Tecuci – Iași and Iași – Pașcani.

=== Local transit ===
The station is served by several tram and bus lines operated by CTP Iași, the local transit operator. Bus route 50 provides non-stop service to the Iași International Airport, with departures every 30 minutes.

== Distance from other railway stations ==
=== Romania ===
- Arad (via Oradea): 732 km (455 mi)
- Bacău: 158 km (98 mi)
- Baia Mare: 533 km (331 mi)
- Brașov (via Buzău): 453 km (281 mi)
- București: 406 km (252 mi)
- Constanța: 430 km (270 mi)
- Craiova: 631 km (392 mi)
- Galați: 255 km (158 mi)
- Oradea: 610 km (380 mi)
- Suceava: 136 km (85 mi)
- Timișoara (via Oradea): 788 km (490 mi)
- Timișoara (via Deva): 847 km (526 mi)

=== Europe ===
- Belgrad (via Cluj-Napoca): 966 km (600 mi)
- Berlin: 1,718 km (1,068 mi)
- Budapest (via București): 1,279 km (795 mi)
- Budapest (via Cluj-Napoca): 858 km (533 mi)
- Chișinău: 130 km (81 mi)
- Frankfurt am Main: 1,260 km (780 mi)
- Kyiv (via Suceava): 916 km (569 mi)
- Kyiv (via Bălți): 619 km (385 mi)
- Sofia: 945 km (587 mi)
- Venice: 1,710 km (1,060 mi)
- Vienna: 1,130 km (700 mi)
