= Roșia fortified church =

Heritage site in Sibiu County, Romania

Coordinates: 45.8154°N 24.3148°E

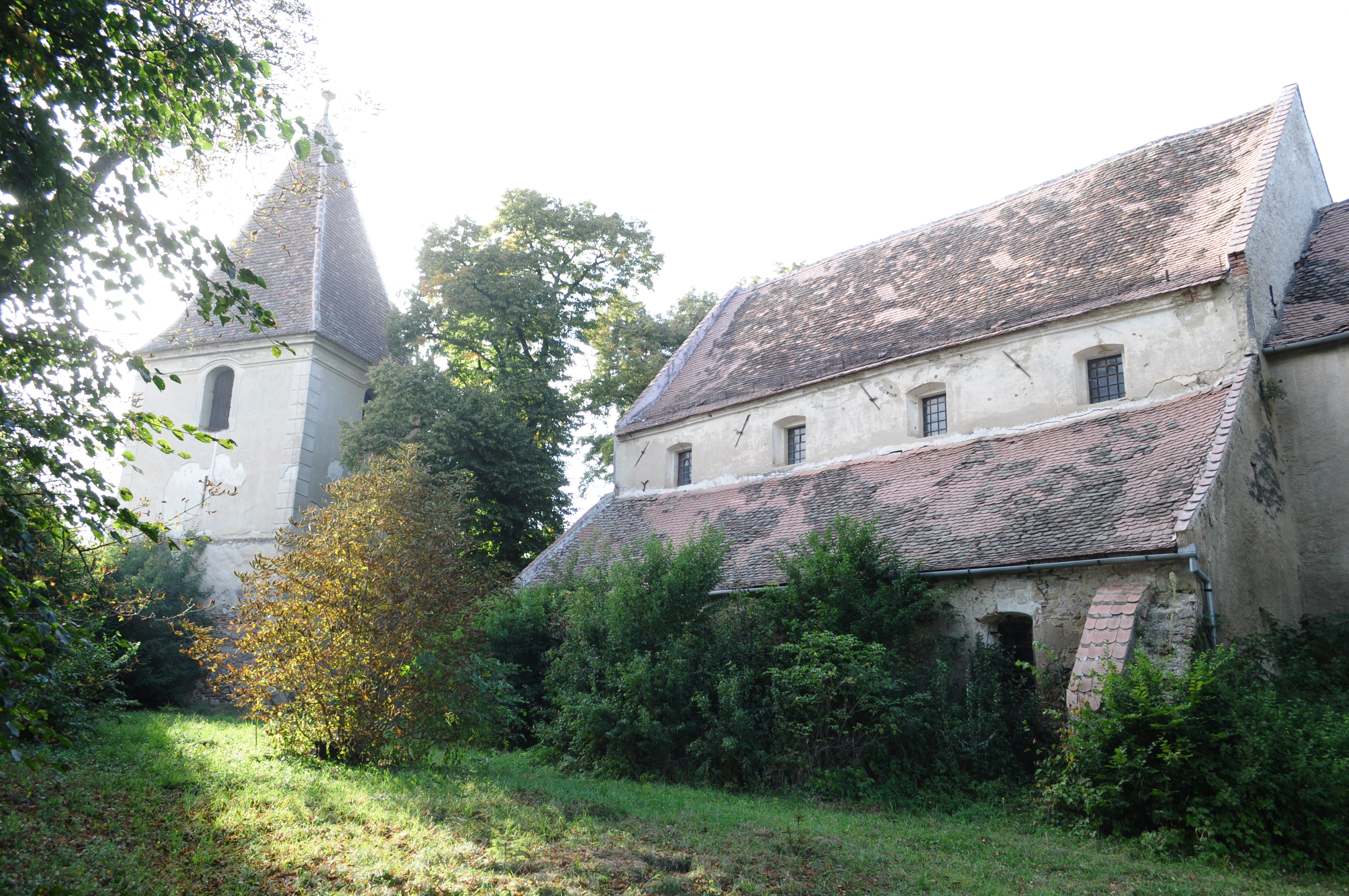
Roșia fortified church

Plan

The Roșia fortified church (Romanian: Biserica fortificată din Roșia; German: Kirchenburg von Rothberg) is a Lutheran fortified church in Roșia (German: Rothberg), Sibiu County, in the Transylvania region of Romania. It was built by the ethnic German Transylvanian Saxon community at a time when the area belonged to the Kingdom of Hungary. Initially Roman Catholic, it became Lutheran following the Protestant Reformation.

== Description ==
The church was built around 1225, and was first mentioned in a document from 1327. A Romanesque basilica dates to the 13th century; surviving elements include the choir, triumphal arch, pillars between the main and side naves, and parts of the north portal, including the windows and upper level. Fortification work took place in the 16th century, with most of the windows and the entrance room in the western part daring to the 18th. In the 19th century, the nave was given a vaulted ceiling held up by pilasters with capitals. The paintings above the triumphal arch are in the Biedermeier style. The 1682 Baroque altar, with its six Corinthian columns and baldachin, is particularly decorative, as is the baldachin-covered pulpit of 1781.

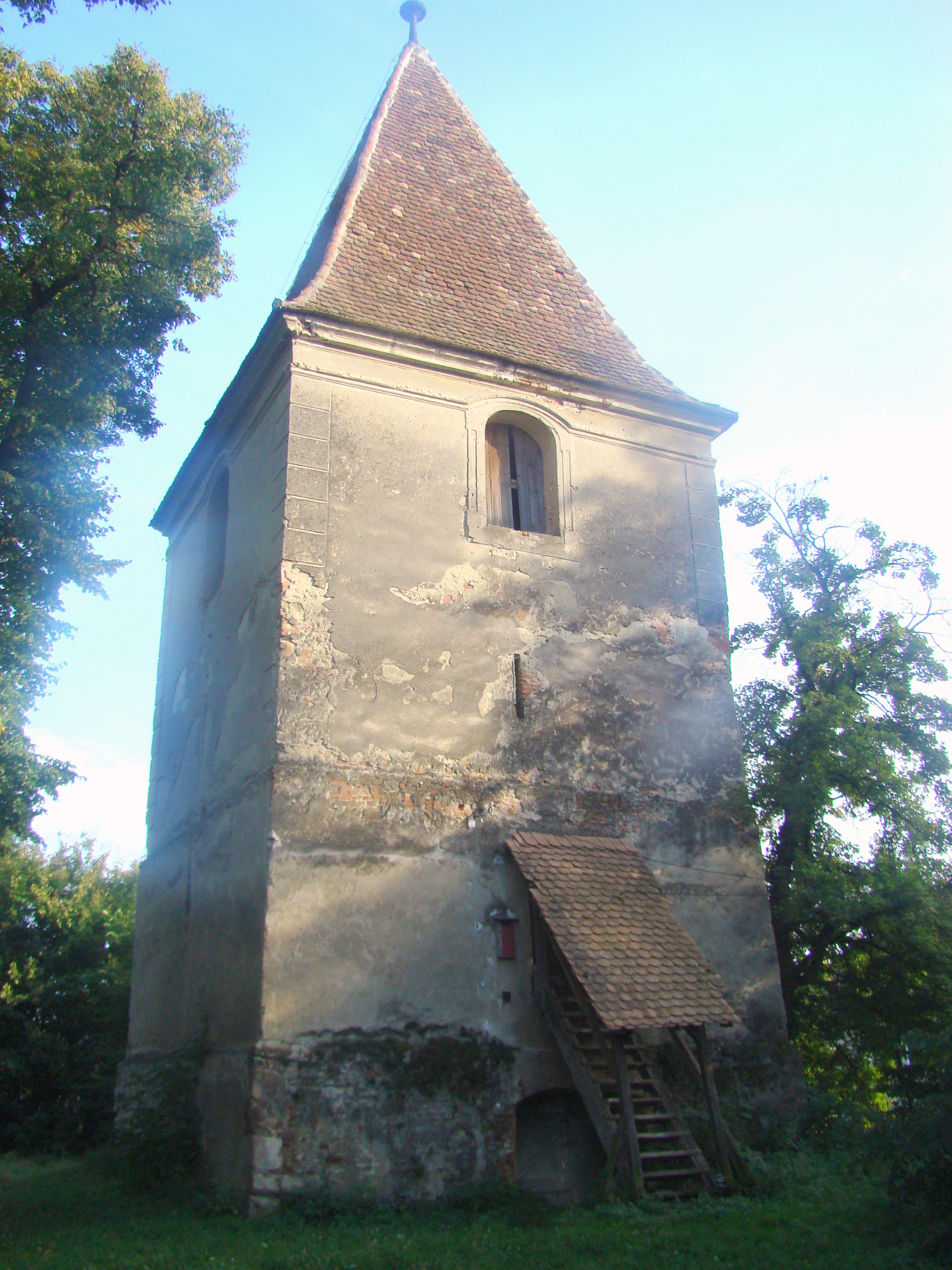
The guard tower

The church resisted numerous armed attacks, including in 1600, when the army of Michael the Brave burned the village to the ground. However, the fortifications now lie in ruins. In 1631, when the village was devastated by a fire, the church tower was destroyed. In the mid-1700s the town was repopulated with immigrants from Austria.

The writer Eginald Schlattner is the parish priest. The church is listed as a historic monument by Romania's Ministry of Culture and Religious Affairs, with the wall fragments and the bell tower being listed as separate entries.
