= Benești railway station =

Railway station in Romania

General information
- Location: Benești, Sibiu County; Romania
- Coordinates: 45.9594°N 24.4939°E
- Owner: CFR Infrastructură
- Line: Agnita railway line
- Platforms: 1
- Tracks: 1

History
- Opened: 1910
- Closed: 2001
Location

Benești railway station was a station on the Agnita railway line in Benești, Sibiu County, Romania. The station still exists along with the track which has been protected.

== History ==
The station was built by the Hungarian State Railways in 1910 who operated it until 1919 when the region of Transylvania became part of Romania. After a decline in usage across the whole line and subsequent curtailing of the route in the 1960s and 1990s the station closed in 2001.

== Future ==
Plans exist to reopen part of the line after it was protected in 2008. The local group Asociația Prietenii Mocăniței has taken on the task of restoring the route which has already restored a section of the line.

| Preceding station | Disused railways | Following station |
|---|---|---|
| Alțâna; Line and station closed | Agnita railway line | Vărd; Line and station closed |
