= Hosman railway station =

Railway station in Nocrich, Romania

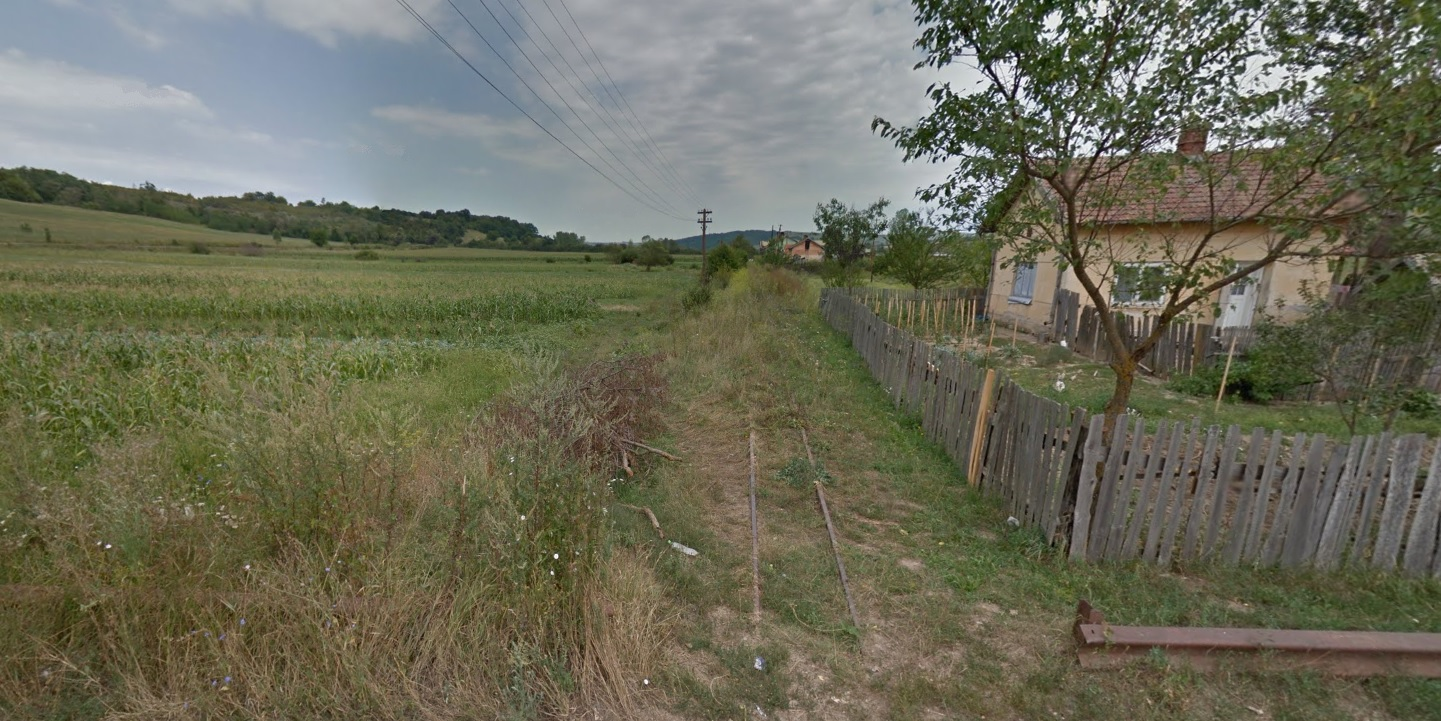

General information
- Location: Romania
- Coordinates: 45.8411°N 24.4236°E
- Owner: CFR Infrastructură
- Line: Agnita railway line
- Platforms: 1
- Tracks: 1

History
- Opened: 1910
- Closed: 2001
Location

Hosman railway station was a station on the Agnita railway line in Hosman, Sibiu County Romania. The station still exists along with the track which has been protected.

== History ==
The station was built by the Hungarian State Railways in 1910 who operated it until 1919 when Transylvania became part of Romania. After a decline in usage across the whole line and subsequent curtailing of the route in the 60s and 90s the station closed in 2001.

== Future ==
Plans exist to reopen part of the line after it was protected in 2008. The local group Asociația Prietenii Mocăniței has taken on the task of restoring the route which has already restored a section of the line.

Preceding station	Disused railways	Following station
Cornăţel; Line and station closed	Agnita railway line	Țichindeal; Line and station closed
