= Irina Petraș =

Romanian writer (born 1947)

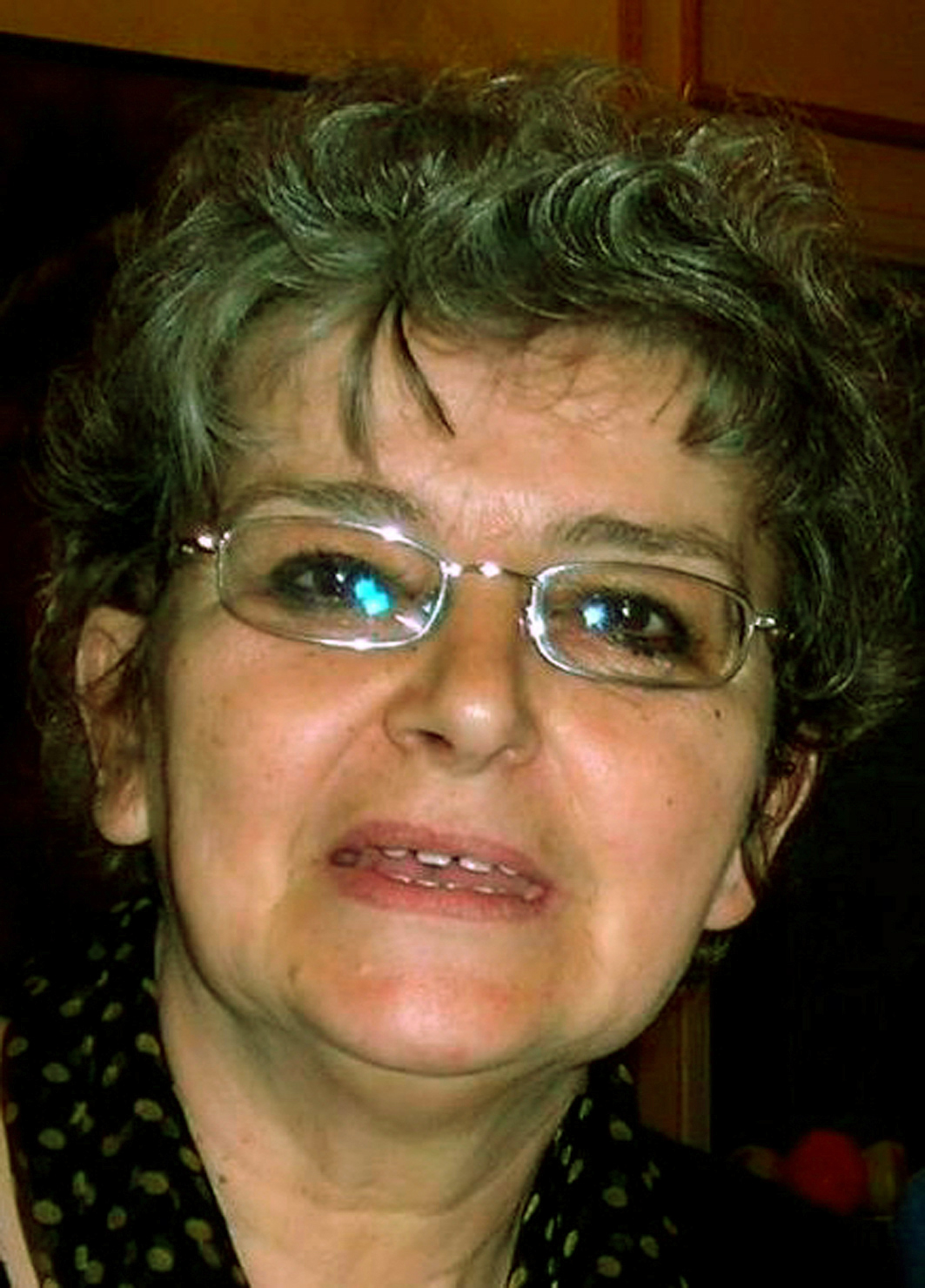
- Born: 27 November 1947 (age 78); Chirpăr, Sibiu County, Romania
- Occupations: literary critic, essayist, translator and editor
- Writing career
- Period: since 1981

Irina Petraș (born 27 November 1947) is a Romanian writer, literary critic, essayist, translator and editor.

== Biography ==
Irina Petraș graduated from high school in Agnita in 1965, and from the Faculty of Letters of the Babeș-Bolyai University in Cluj-Napoca in 1970. She earned a PhD in Romanian literature with the thesis entitled: Camil Petrescu, the Fiction Writer/Camil Petrescu, prozatorul (1980). She was editor of the Didactic and Pedagogic Publishing House (coordinator of the "Akademos" collection: 1990–1999), editor-in-chief of Casa Cărţii de Ştiinţă Publishing House, Cluj-Napoca (1999–2012). Currently she is president of the Cluj branch of the Writers' Union of Romania (since 2005).

== Publishing activity ==
Irina Petraș's first published book was Proza lui Camil Petrescu (Camil Petrescu's Fiction) (1981). She has published four essays on the theme of death, two prominent ones are Ştiința morţii (The Knowledge of Death) (1995) and Moartea la purtător. Stări și cuvinte (Death by Proxy. Moods and Words) (2012). Drawing on suggestions from well-known works on death by Philippe Ariès, Georges Bataille, Edgar Morin, Emmanuel Lévinas, Jean Ziegler, Louis Vincent Thomas, Vladimir Jankélévitch, Jean Baudrillard, etc., but also by Emil Cioran, Ion Biberi and Mircea Eliade, Petraș's essays approach the problem of finitude from an innovative and unprejudiced perspective. She selects and comments freely upon statements concerning the state of deadness, emphasizing various facets of key ideas, almost turning them into leitmotifs: death is a process, not a one-off event; intravital death is worth all the manifestations of life and it alone gives them meaning and importance; a reform of death would restore the dignity of man, who is now lost under the pressure of deceptive dogmas; the mortal condition, as the supreme sign of humanness, can become a force; "the immortal" – either "the new man" of totalitarian systems or the serene and irresponsible "consumer" of post-industrial society – endangers not only the quality of life, but the very existence of humankind. Man's subjection to the dictates of fate is a necessary evil, and one that makes it possible for him to value his passing life; the only salvation that man has is art, creation. Petraş has also published several books on femininity and the so-called "sexuate regard" of the Romanian language. Her work, Feminitatea limbii române. Genosanalize (The Femininity of the Romanian Language – Gender Analyses), takes its cue from one of Eminescu's famous phrases: the language, our mistress. The book is built on the assumption that one's mother tongue influences one's Worldview. The first section, Worlds and Words, focuses research on the noun (Hauptwort in German) and its genders. Thus, the Romanian language reveals its "sexual focus". Its femininity (there are mostly feminine nouns that provide the definition of the Romanian dimension of being), with its obvious bias towards androgyny (the Romanian language does not have a neutral gender, but rather an ambigenus that names things with a "double personality", androgynously), could explain many characteristics of the Romanian man. The second section, Sexual focus and poetry (Gender Analyses), draws on examples from both Romanian and foreign language poetry to support the idea that the gender of nouns organizes the written space, contributes specific nuances to the poetic perspective and deepens the particular manner in which each language represents the world. Petraș is also known for her books on Romanian literature (see the thousand-plus page work Contemporary Romanian Literature. A Panorama). She has published many dictionaries and handbooks in the field of literary theory. Petraș has also translated extensively from English and French into Romanian (Henry James, Marcel Moreau, Jacques De Decker, Jean-Luc Outers, Michel Haar, G. K. Chesterton, D. H. Lawrence, Guy de Maupassant, Anatole France, Mac Linscott Ricketts, Philip Roth, Michel Lambert, Philippe Jones etc.)

She was married to the writer Petru Poantă.

== Works ==
=== Essays, literary criticism ===
- Proza lui Camil Petrescu, Cluj-Napoca: Editura Dacia, 1981;
- Un veac de nemurire: Mihai Eminescu, Veronica Micle, Ion Creangă, Cluj-Napoca: Editura Dacia, 1989;
- Ion Creangă, povestitorul, București: Editura Didactică şi Pedagogică, 1992; second edition, Cluj-Napoca: Biblioteca Apostrof, 2004;
- Camil Petrescu – schițe pentru un portret, București: Editura Demiurg, 1994;
- Știința morții, vol. I, Cluj-Napoca: Editura Dacia, 1995, vol. II, Piteşti: Editura Paralela 45, 2001;
- Limba, stăpâna noastră. Încercare asupra feminității limbii române, Cluj-Napoca: Casa Cărţii de Ştiinţă, 1999;
- Panorama criticii literare românești. Dicționar ilustrat 1950–2000, Cluj-Napoca: Casa Cărţii de Ştiinţă, 2001;
- Feminitatea limbii române. Genosanalize, Cluj-Napoca: Casa Cărţii de Ştiinţă, 2002;
- Cărțile deceniului 10, Cluj-Napoca: Casa Cărţii de Ştiinţă, 2003;
- Camil Petrescu. Schițe pentru un portret, Cluj-Napoca: Biblioteca Apostrof, 2003;
- Despre locuri și locuire, București: Editura Ideea Europeană, 2005;
- Despre feminitate, moarte și alte eternități, București: Editura Ideea Europeană, 2006;
- Teme și digresiuni, Cluj-Napoca: Casa Cărţii de Ştiinţă, 2006;
- Cărți de ieri și de azi, Cluj-Napoca: Casa Cărţii de Ştiinţă, 2007;
- Literatură română contemporană. O panoramă, București: Editura Ideea Europeană, 2008;
- Literatură română contemporană. Prelungiri, Cluj-Napoca: Casa Cărţii de Ştiinţă, 2010;
- Locuirea cu stil, Cluj-Napoca: Casa Cărţii de Ştiinţă, 2010;
- Moartea la purtător. Stări și cuvinte, București: Editura ASE, 2012;
- Divagări inutile. Viață și literatură, Cluj-Napoca: Editura Eikon, 2012;
- Oglinda şi drumul. Prozatori contemporani, București: Editura Cartea Românească, 2013;
- ′′Vitraliul și fereastra. Poeți români contemproani, Editura Școala Ardeleană, 2015
- De veghe între cărți. Scriitori contemporani, Editura Școala Ardeleană, 2017;
- Viața mea de noapte. Fragmente onirice, Editura Școala Ardeleană, 2017;

° Ochii minții. Eseuri, cronci, divagări, Editura Școala Ardeleană, 2020;

° Eminescu - începutul continuu, 2021;

- Efectul de crepuscul. Eseuri, divagări, Editura Școala Ardeleană, 2022;

=== Didactic writings ===
- Curente literare – dicționar-antologie, București: Editura Demiurg, 1992;
- Figuri de stil – dicționar-antologie, București: Editura Demiurg, 1992;
- Genuri și specii literare – dicționar-antologie, București: Editura Demiurg, 1993;
- Literatură română contemporană – secțiuni, critică literară, București: Editura Didactică şi Pedagogică, 1994;
- Metrică și prozodie – dicționar-antologie, București: Editura Demiurg, 1995;
- Teoria literaturii – dicționar-antologie, București: Editura Demiurg, 1996; second edition, Cluj-Napoca: Biblioteca Apostrof, 2002; third edition, București: Editura Didactică şi Pedagogică, 2008;
- Literatura română pentru gimnaziu și pentru examenul de capacitate, Cluj-Napoca: Casa Cărţii de Ştiinţă, 1999;
- Fabrica de literatură urmată de mic dicționar de teorie literară și literatura lumii în repere cronologice, Piteşti: Editura Paralela 45, 2003;
- Mic îndreptar de scriere corectă, Piteşti: Editura Paralela 45, 2004.

=== Journalism ===
- Miezul lucrurilor. Convorbiri cu Alexandru Deșliu, Focşani: Editura Pallas Athena, 2006.

=== Editions ===
- Ion Brad, Rădăcinile cerului, București: Editura Eminescu, 1989;
- Eminescu – album-antologie, București: Editura Didactică şi Pedagogică, 1997;
- Ioana Em. Petrescu, Modele cosmologice și viziune poetică, Piteşti: Editura Paralela 45, 1999, 2001;
- Radu Stanca, Turnul Babel. Teatru, Piteşti: Editura Paralela 45, 2001;
- Ion Creangă, Povești, povestiri, amintiri, Cluj-Napoca: Editura Dacia, 1999, 2001;
- Ioan Pavel Petraș, Cartea vieții, Cluj-Napoca: Casa Cărţii de Ştiinţă, 2004.

=== Collective volumes (co-author) ===
- Camil Petrescu interpretat de..., București: Editura Eminescu, 1984;
- Dicționarul scriitorilor români, coordinated Mircea Zaciu, Marian Papahagi, Aurel Sasu, vol. II-IV, București: Editura Albatros, 1998–2002;
- Meridian Blaga, I-VIII, Cluj-Napoca: Casa Cărţii de Ştiinţă, 2000–2008;
- Nicolae Balotă 75, Cluj-Napoca: Biblioteca Apostrof, 2000;
- Nicolae Breban 75, București: Editura Ideea Europeană, 2004;
- Cartea taților, Cluj-Napoca: Biblioteca Apostrof, 2004;
- Problema evreiască, București: Editura Ideea Europeană, 2006;
- Înapoi la lirism coord. Aurel Pantea, Tg. Mureş: Editura Ardealul, 2006;
- Scriitorul și trupul său, Cluj-Napoca: Biblioteca Apostrof, 2007;
- Cartea cu bunici, București: Editura Humanitas, 2007;
- Ion Ianoși 80, București: Editura Ideea Europeană, 2008;
- Antologia prozei scurte transilvane, Cluj-Napoca: Editura Limes, 2010;
- Ion Pop 70, Piteşti: Editura Paralela 45, 2011;
- Ion Pop – șapte decenii de melancolie și literatură, Cluj-Napoca: Editura Limes, 2011;
- Marea scriitorilor. De la Olimp la zidul Puterii, București: Editura Cartea Românească, 2012.

=== Collective volumes published abroad ===
- Poetes roumains contemporains, anthology and preface, Quebec, 2000; Marseille, 2000;
- Auteurs européens du premier XXe siècle, vol. 1–2, Bruxelles, 2002;
- Il romanzo rumeno contemporaneo 1989–2010. Teorie e proposte di lettura, a cura di Nicoleta Nesu, edizione italiana di Angela Tarantino, premessa di Luisa Valmarin, Roma, 2010.

=== Translations ===
- Henry James, Povestiri cu fantome, Cluj-Napoca: Editura Echinox, 1991;
- Anatoli Râbakov, Copiii din Arbat, Cluj-Napoca: Editura Echinox, 1991;
- Marcel Moreau, Discurs contra piedicilor, București: Editura Libra, 1993;
- Marcel Moreau, Farmecul și groaza, București: Editura Libra, 1994;
- Virgil Tănase, România mea, București: Editura Didactică şi Pedagogică, 1996;
- Poeți din Quebec, antologie, București: Editura Didactică şi Pedagogică, 1997;
- Sylvain Rivière, Locuri anume, București: Editura Libra, 1997;
- Marcel Moreau, Artele viscerale, București: Editura Libra, 1997;
- Marcel Moreau, Celebrarea femeii, București: Editura Libra, 1998;
- Jacques de Decker, Roata cea mare, București: Editura Libra, 1998;
- Jean-Luc Outers, Locul mortului, București: Editura Libra, 1998;
- Michel Haar, Cântul pământului. Heidegger și temeiurile istoriei ființei, Cluj-Napoca: Biblioteca Apostrof, 1998;
- G. K. Chesterton, Orthodoxia sau dreapta credință, Piteşti: Editura Paralela 45, 1999 (second edititon, 2002);
- Poeme. Cinci poeți portughezi (în colab.), București: Editura Didactică şi Pedagogică, 1999;
- Philip Roth, Animal pe moarte, Iaşi: Editura Polirom, 2006; 2011;
- Jean-Luc Outers, Compania apelor, București: Editura Libra, 2002;
- Michel Lambert, A treia treaptă, Cluj-Napoca: Casa Cărţii de Ştiinţă, 2003;
- Marcel Moreau, Extaz pentru o domniță româncă, București: Editura Libra, 2004;
- Ştefan J. Fay / Marcel Moreau, Epistolar, Cluj-Napoca: Casa Cărţii de Ştiinţă, 2005;
- Phillipe Jones, Proze, Cluj-Napoca: Casa Cărţii de Ştiinţă, 2005.

== Affiliations ==
- Member of the Writers' Union of Romania
