= Căile Ferate Române Line 600 =

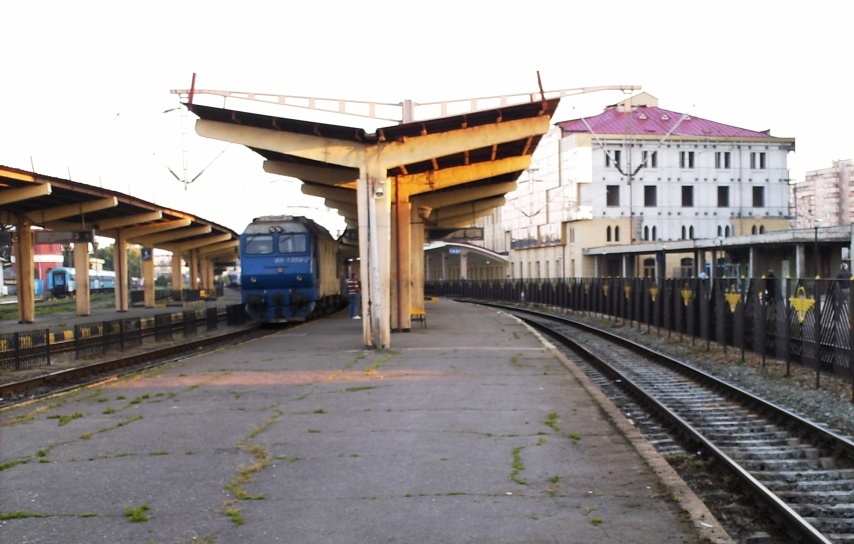
- Iași railway station lies at the junction of Lines 600, 606, 607 and 608

Overview
- Owner: Romanian State
- Locale: Botoșani, Brăila, Galați, Iași, Vaslui
- Stations: 17

Service
- Operator(s): Căile Ferate Române

Technical
- Track gauge: 1,435 mm (4 ft 8 1/2 in) standard gauge
Route map

Line 600 is one of CFR's main lines in Romania having a total length of 395 km (245 mi). The main line, connecting Făurei (on the line from Bucharest to Galați) with the Moldovan border near Ungheni, passes through Tecuci, Bârlad, Vaslui, and Iași.

== Main and secondary lines ==
Line	Terminal stations		Intermediate stops	Length (km)
600	Făurei	Ungheni	Tecuci - Bârlad - Vaslui - Nicolina - Iași - Nicolina International - Socola	395
603	Bârlad	Prut	Fălciu Nord	82
604	Crasna	Huși		33
605	Roman	Buhăiești		71
606	Iași	Pașcani*	Târgu Frumos	76
607	Iași	Hârlău	Podu Iloaiei	64
608	Iași	Dorohoi	Lețcani - Dângeni	154

Coloured background indicates a main line.

*connection between Lines 500 & 600
