= Hârlău =

- Town
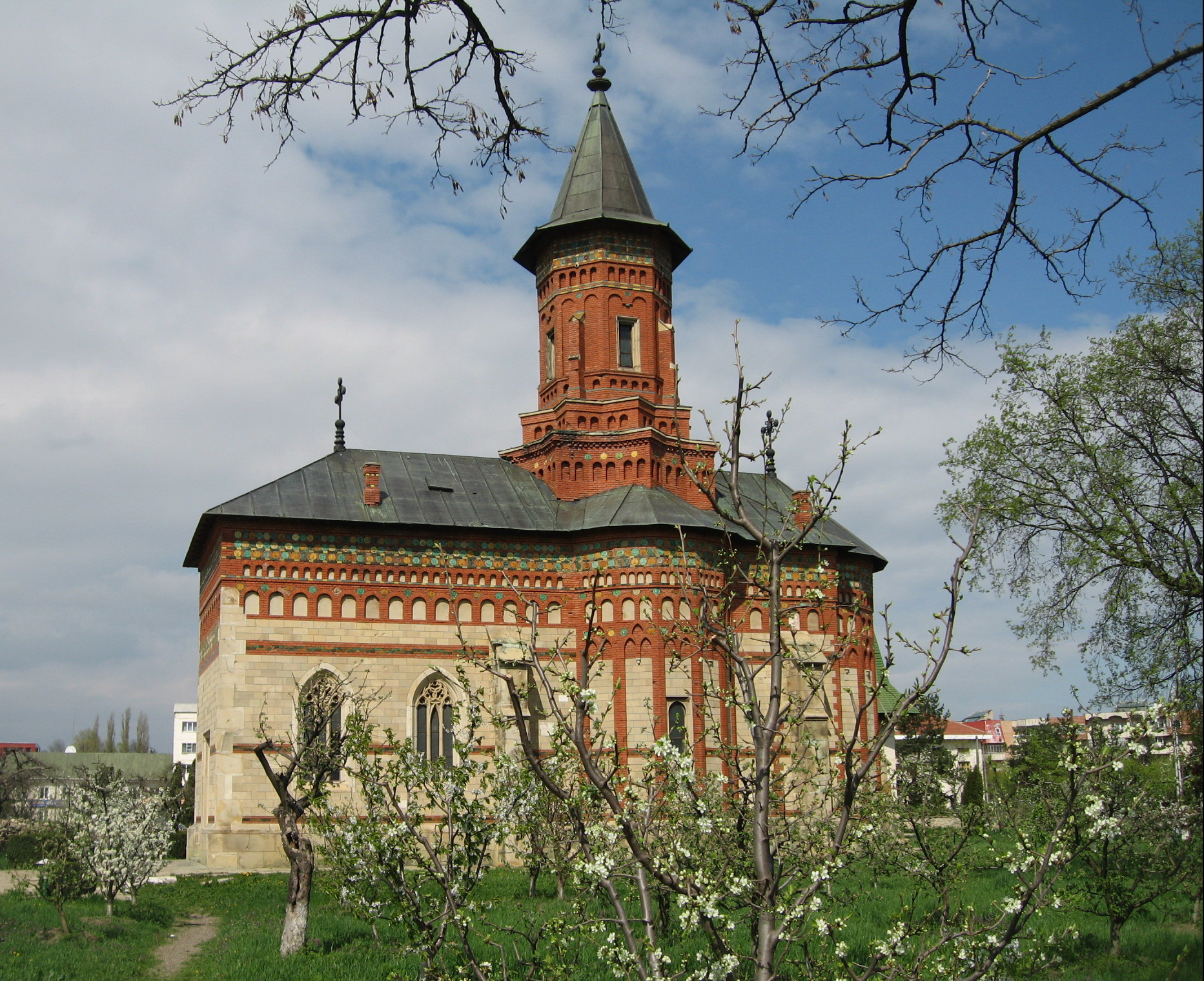
- St. George Church (1492)

- Coat of arms

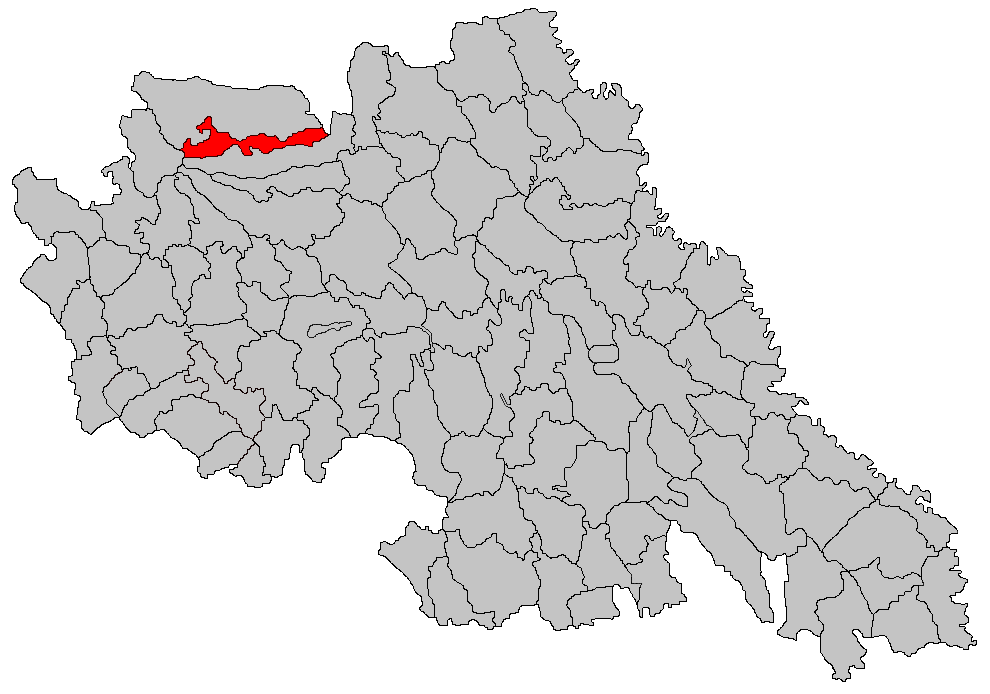
- Location in Iași County

- Location in Romania
- Coordinates: 47°25′40″N 26°54′41″E
- Country: Romania
- County: Iași

Government
  - Mayor (2024–2028): Gheorghiță Curcă (PSD)
- Area: 40.36 km^{2} (15.58 sq mi)
- Elevation: 180 m (590 ft)
- Population (2021-12-01): 10,349
  - Density: 256.4/km^{2} (664.1/sq mi)
- Time zone: UTC+02:00 (EET)
  - Summer (DST): UTC+03:00 (EEST)
- Postal code: 705100
- Area code: (+40) 02 32
- Vehicle reg.: IS
- Website: www.primaria-hirlau.ro

Hârlău (formerly spelled Hîrlău, Romanian pronunciation: [hɨrˈləw]; Hebrew: חרלאו; Hungarian: Harló; German: Hirlau or Crolow) is a town in Iași County, Western Moldavia, Romania. It was one of the princely court cities of Moldavia, in the 15th century. One village, Pârcovaci, is administered by the town.

== Geography ==
The town is located in the northwestern part of Iași County, at a distance of 28 km (17 mi) from Târgu Frumos and 70 km (43 mi) from the county seat, Iași. It is situated close to the border with Botoșani County, 48 km (30 mi) south of the city of Botoșani.

Hârlău lies on the banks of the Bahlui River. It is crossed by national road DN28B, which is part of European route E58. The Hârlău train station is the terminus of the CFR Line 607, which starts at the Iași railway station.

== Population ==
The 2011 census counted 10,905 inhabitants, 93.85% Romanians and 6.06% Roma. At the 2021 census, the town had a population of 10,349; of those, 76.66% were Romanians and 8.49% Roma. A large Jewish community used to live in Hârlău.

| Year | Number | % of Jews in the General Population |
|---|---|---|
| 1803 | 784 | |
| 1838 | 1,008 | |
| 1859 | 1,389 | |
| 1886 | 2,254 | 56.6 |
| 1899 | 2,718 | 59.9 |
| 1910 | 2,023 | |
| 1930 | 2,032 | 22.3 |
| 1941 | 1,736 | 18.0 |
| 1942 | 1,300 | |
| 1947 | 1,936 | |
| 2002 | 11,268 | |
| 2011 | 10,905 | |
| 2021 | 10,349 | |

== Natives ==
- Lucian Boz (1908–2003), literary critic, essayist, novelist, poet, and translator
- Horia Carp (1869–1943), writer, journalist, and politician
- Mihail Davidoglu (1910–1987), playwright
- Carol Iancu (born 1946), historian
- Michel Landau (1895–1976), jurist and politician
- Gheorghe Petz (1894–1974), Catholic priest
- Petru Rareș (c.1483–1546), Prince of Moldavia
- Mordecai Sandberg (1897–1973), composer and physician
