= Teodor Aaron =

Romanian Greek Catholic priest and historian (1803–1867)

Teodor Aaron (or Aron) (1803 – February 6, 1867) was a Romanian Greek Catholic clergyman and historian.

He was born in the village of Cikendál, Transylvania, now Țichindeal, Romania. He studied at the Greek Catholic Church in Bihar County, and graduated from Central Seminary in Budapest in 1828. Aaron was ordained on October 30, 1829. After that he worked as a teacher and principal at the Belényes (Beiuș) Gymnasium (1830-1835). In 1835 he became a priest in Galsa, and in 1839 in Arad. In 1842, he started working as an "revisor" of the Romanian-language books published by the Buda University Press. From 1848 he was a priest in Gyalány (Delani), and only returned to Buda in 1851 as the Romanian government's official translator. In 1855, he became a priest in Oradea, and in 1857 in Lugoj.

== Works ==
- Scurta apendice la Istoria lui Petru Maior care prin adevarurile marturisirii a mai multor sriitori vechi, inceputul romanilor din romani adevarati la mai mare lumina il pune. Buda, 1828
- Anotari din istoria eclesiastica. Despre urzarea si latirea credintiei crestine intre romani. Pest, 1850 (Adnotations on ecclesiastic history. On the [...] and spreading of the Christian faith among the Rumanians)
- Catehetica practica sau aratarea cum sa se propuna invataturile catihetice a credintei crestinesti la varsta cea tanara, Buda, 1843 (Practical Catechism or Showing how to suggest catechismal teachings of Christian learning at a young age)
- Cuvantari bisericesti despre cele sapte pacate ale capeteniei pe duminecile paresimilor, Buda, 1847, 66 p. (Sermons on the seven cardinal sins on Lent Sundays)
