= Sibiu Steam Locomotives Museum =

Coordinates: 45.7968484°N 24.1665448°E

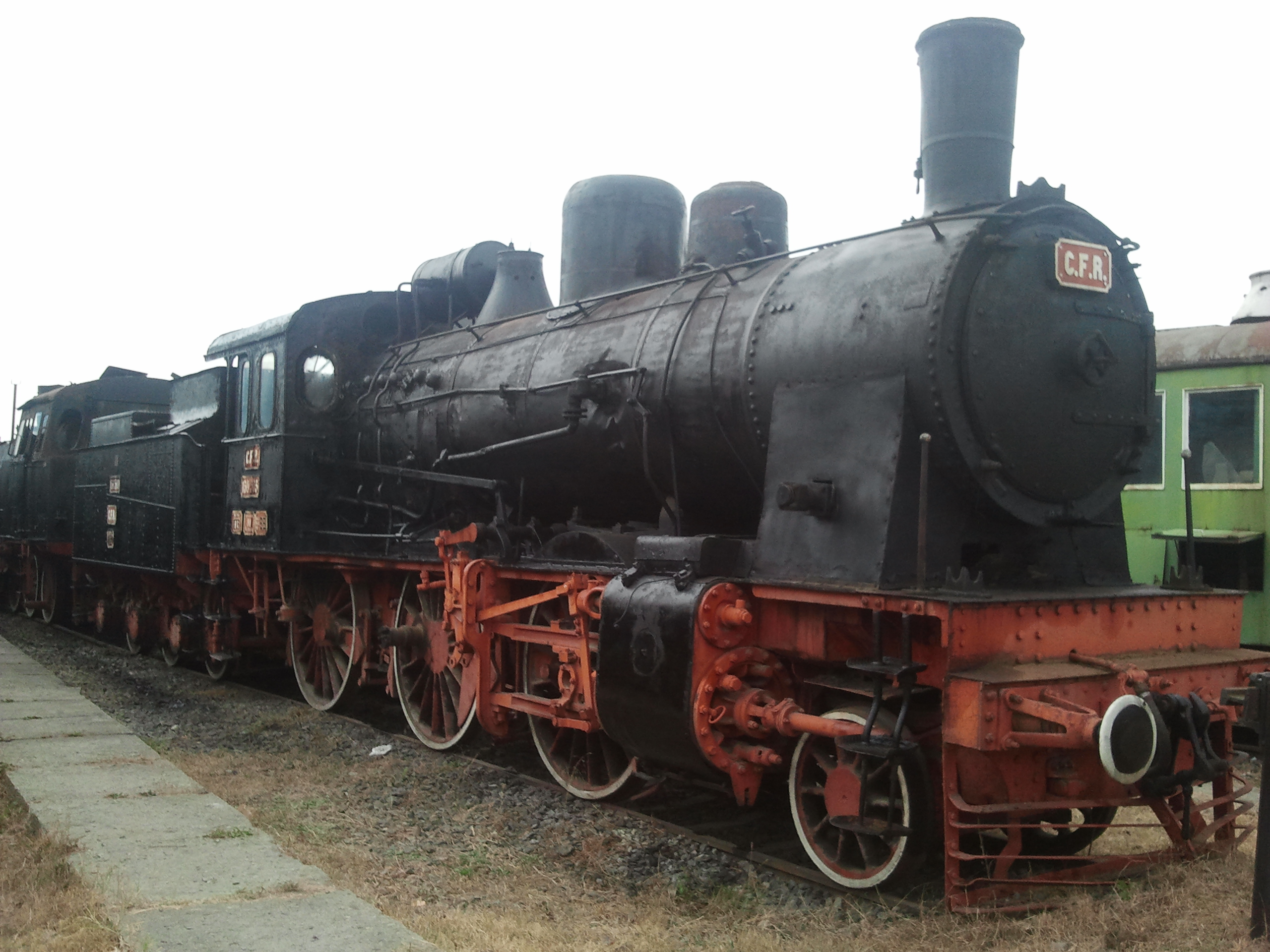
Seria 130.500 locomotive

The Steam Locomotives Museum (Romanian: Muzeul locomotivelor cu abur) is a railway museum in Sibiu, Romania. It houses a collection of steam locomotives and engines.

Inaugurated in 1994, the museum comprises 23 standard gauge locomotives, 10 narrow gauge locomotives, 3 snowploughs and 2 steam cranes. 7 of these locomotives are active, and are used on a variety of special trains for enthusiasts and other groups.

The Locomotives Museum is located opposite the main railway station in Sibiu, comprising the former roundhouse and turntable across the railway lines. Part of the depot area is still used so care should always be taken. In addition, there is usually a narrow gauge steam locomotive based at the depot of the narrow gauge Agnita railway line (follow the narrow gauge lines east from the station).

The locomotives displayed were built between 1885 and 1959 in Romania and other countries, such as Germany (Henschel & Sohn, Borsig, Schwartzkopff) and the United States (Baldwin Locomotive Works).
