= Vurpăr =

- Commune
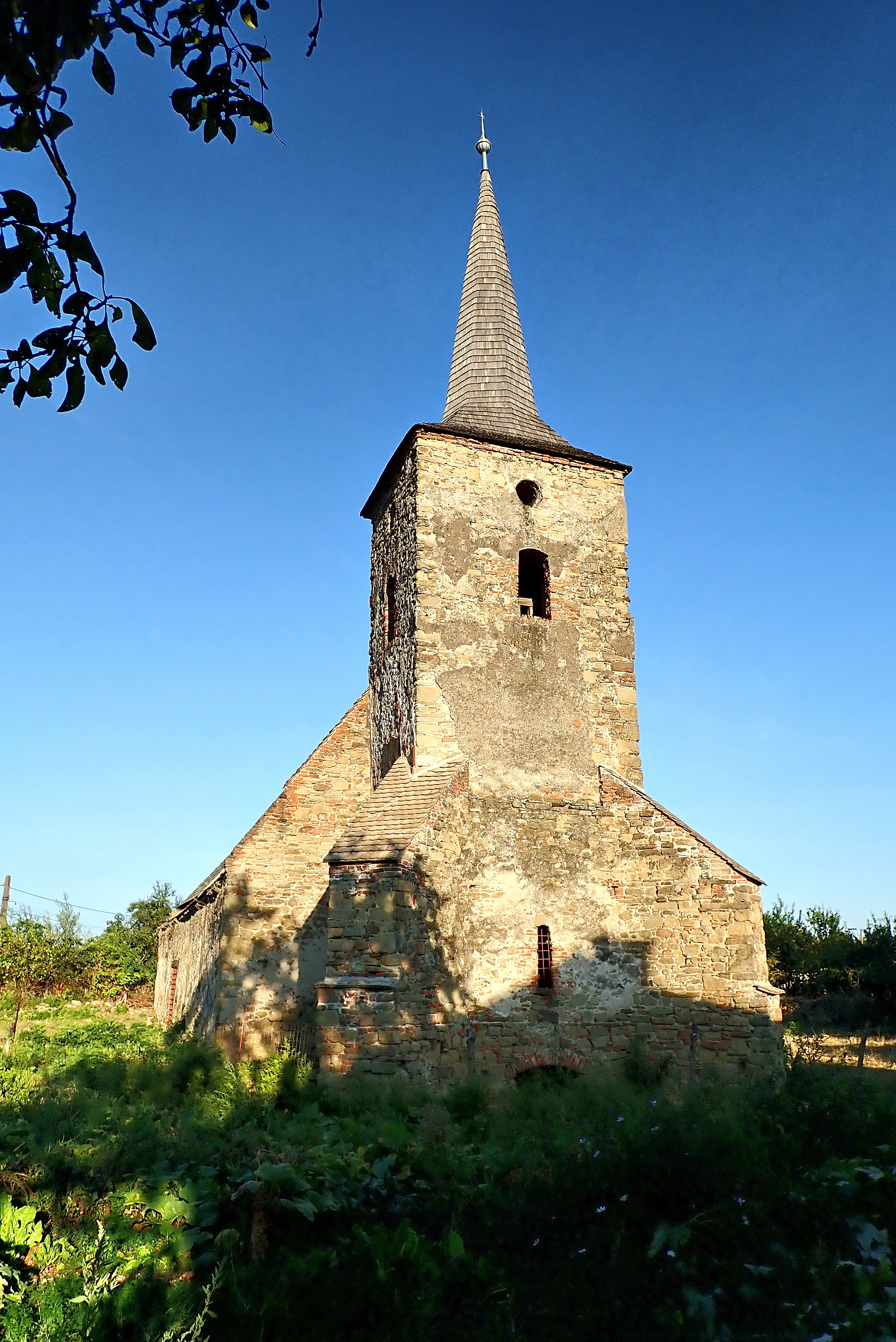
- Evangelical church in Vurpăr

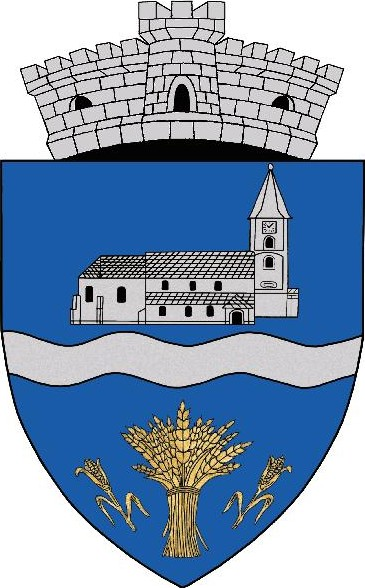
- Coat of arms

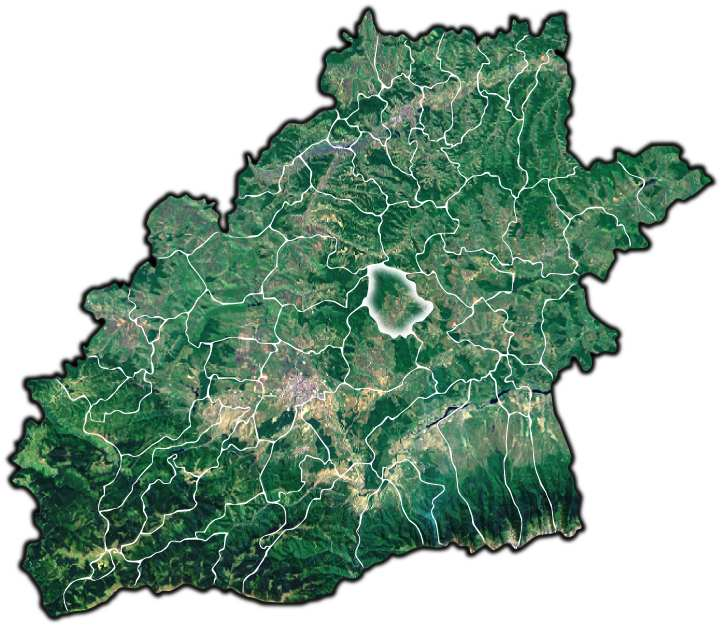
- Location in Sibiu County

- Location in Romania
- Coordinates: 45°53′48″N 24°20′36″E
- Country: Romania
- County: Sibiu

Government
  - Mayor (2024–2028): Mihail Lienerth (PSD)
- Area: 71.74 km^{2} (27.70 sq mi)
- Elevation: 475 m (1,558 ft)
- Population (2021-12-01): 2,778
  - Density: 38.72/km^{2} (100.3/sq mi)
- Time zone: UTC+02:00 (EET)
  - Summer (DST): UTC+03:00 (EEST)
- Postal code: 557295
- Area code: (+40) 02 69
- Vehicle reg.: SB
- Website: www.vurpar.ro

Vurpăr (German: Burgberg; Hungarian: Vurpód) is a commune in Sibiu County, Transylvania, central Romania. It is composed of a single village, Vurpăr.

== Geography ==
The commune lies on the Transylvanian Plateau in the central part of the county, 28 km (17 mi) northeast of the county seat of Sibiu.

The Vurpăr railway station was the terminus of the Vurpăr branch line of the Agnita railway line. It still exists, along with the track, which has been protected.

== History ==
Germans ((namely, Transylvanian Saxons) were long dominant in Burgberg, which was founded in the 13th century. Most of the commune's residents, who are governed by a mayor and a council, work in agriculture.

== Demographics ==
Historical population
Year	Pop.	±%
1850	1,717	—
1930	2,399	+39.7%
1992	2,145	−10.6%
2002	2,359	+10.0%
2011	2,557	+8.4%
2021	2,778	+8.6%
Source: Census data

At the 1930 census, the commune had a population of 2,399; of those, 1,204 were Romanians, 961 Germans, and 9 Jews. In 2002, Vurpăr had 2,359 inhabitants, of whom 1,298 were Romanians, 1,010 Roma, 50 Germans, and 1 other; of those, 2,154 were Romanian Orthodox, 29 were Lutheran, and most of the rest belonged to newer Protestant faiths. At the 2011 census, there were 2,557 inhabitants, of whom 94.45% were Romanians and 1.49% Germans. At the 2021 census, Vurpăr had a population of 2,778.
