= Cornățel railway station =

Railway station in Sibiu County, Romania

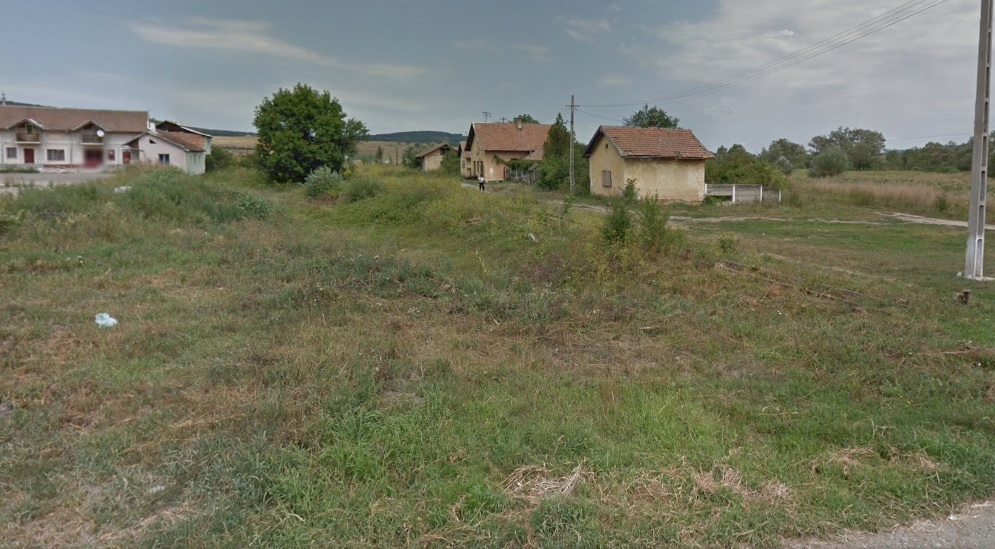

General information
- Location: Romania
- Coordinates: 45.8027°N 24.3529°E
- Owner: CFR Infrastructură
- Line: Agnita railway line
- Platforms: 1
- Tracks: 2

History
- Opened: 1910
- Closed: 2001
Location

Cornățel railway station was a station on the Agnita railway line in Cașolț, Sibiu County, Romania. The station still exists along with the track which has been protected.

== History ==
The station was built by the Hungarian State Railways in 1910 who operated it until 1919 when Transylvania became part of Romania. After a decline in usage across the whole line and subsequent curtailing of the route in the 1960s and 1990s, the station closed in 2001.

== Future ==
Plans exist to reopen part of the line after it was protected in 2008. The local group Asociația Prietenii Mocăniței has taken on the task of restoring the route which has already restored a section of the line.

Preceding station	Disused railways	Following station
Cașolț; Line and station open	Agnita railway line	Hosman; Line and station closed
Terminus	Vurpăr branch line	Roșia; Line and station closed
