= Sibiu railway station =

Railway station in Sibiu, Romania

Coordinates: 45°48′00.83″N 24°09′42.23″E

Sibiu
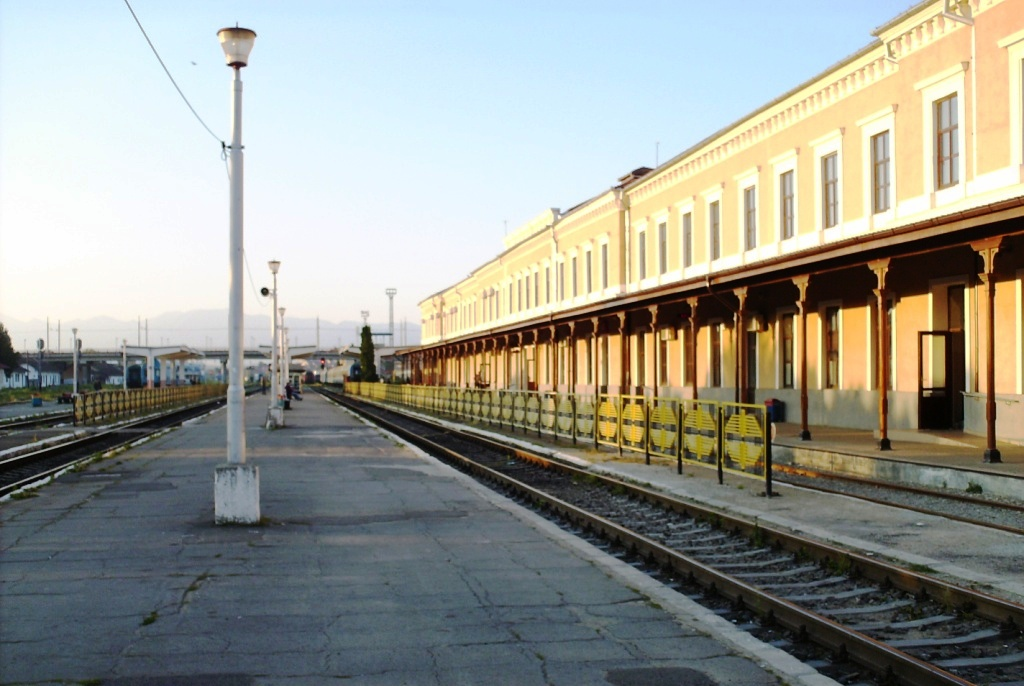

General information
- Location: Piața 1 Decembrie 1918, Sibiu, Romania
- Owner: CFR
- Lines: Căile Ferate Române Line 200; Sibiu-Copșa Mică; Agnita railway line (defunct)
- Platforms: 3

Construction
- Parking: yes

History
- Opened: 11 October 1872
Location

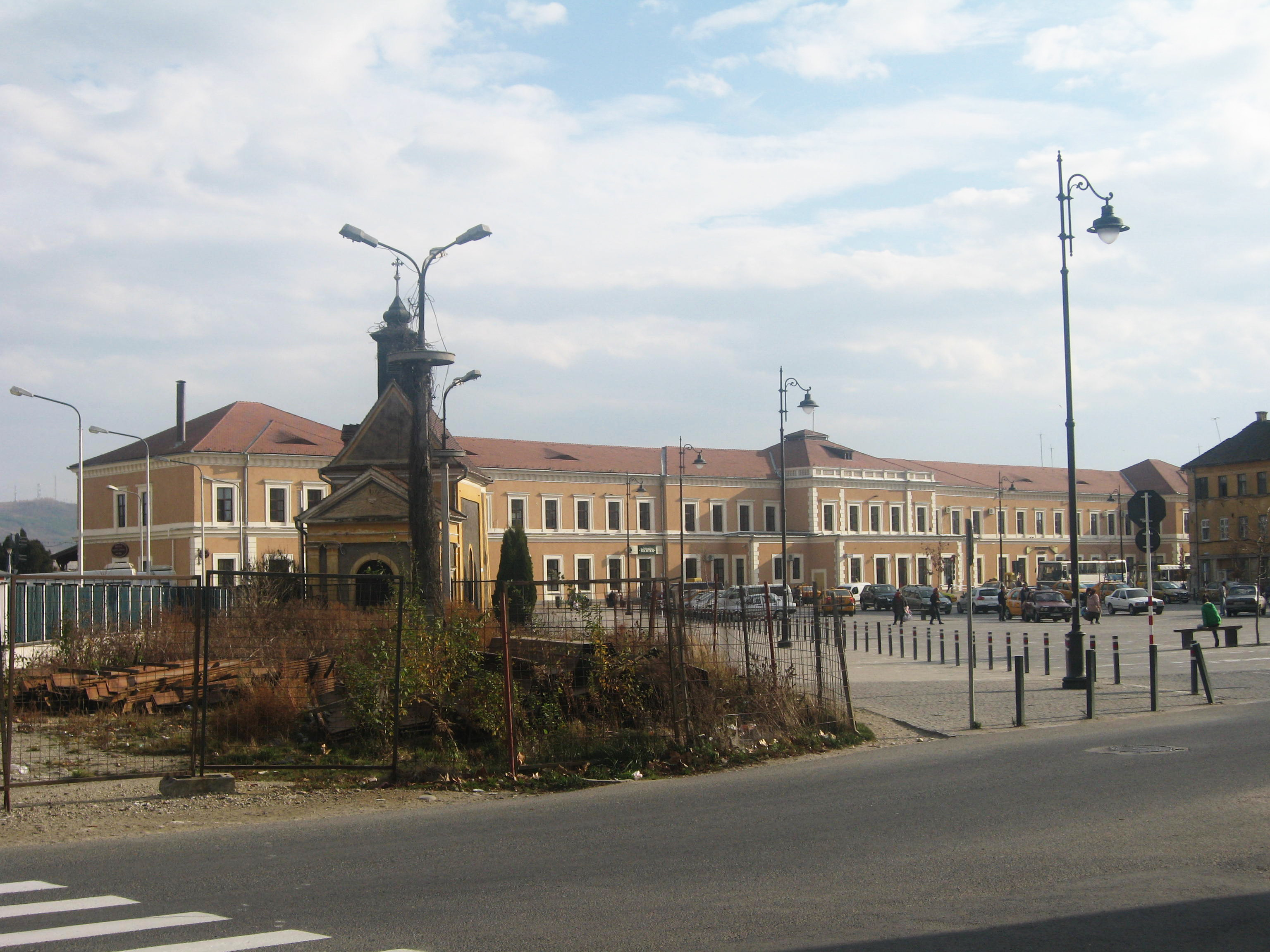
The Sibiu railway station

Sibiu railway station is the main railway station in Sibiu, Romania.

== Services ==
The station is located near Sibiu city center. In 2008 this station served about 80 domestic trains, along with state-operated trains from Căile Ferate Române. The international trains run to Budapest (Hungary).

The main domestic lines are

- Brașov – Făgăraș – Sibiu – Vințu de Jos – Simeria – Arad – Curtici.
- Sibiu – Podu Olt – Râmnicu Vâlcea – Piatra Olt.
- Sibiu – Copșa Mică.

The station also serves the 60 km (37 mi) long Agnita railway line narrow gauge railway, which stopped operating in 2001 but there is hope of its reopening as a tourism railway.
