= Nocrich =

- Commune
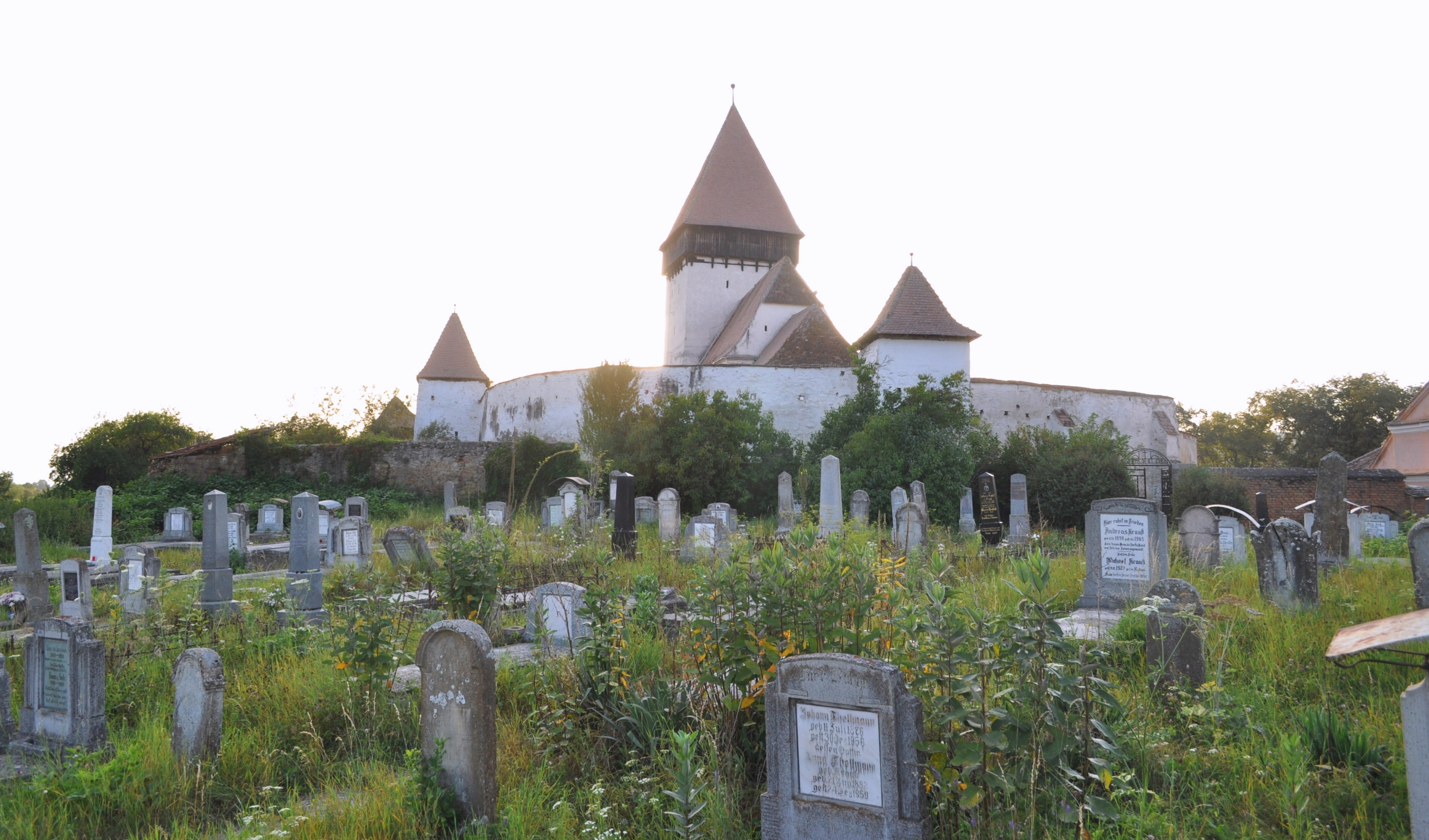
- Hosman fortified church

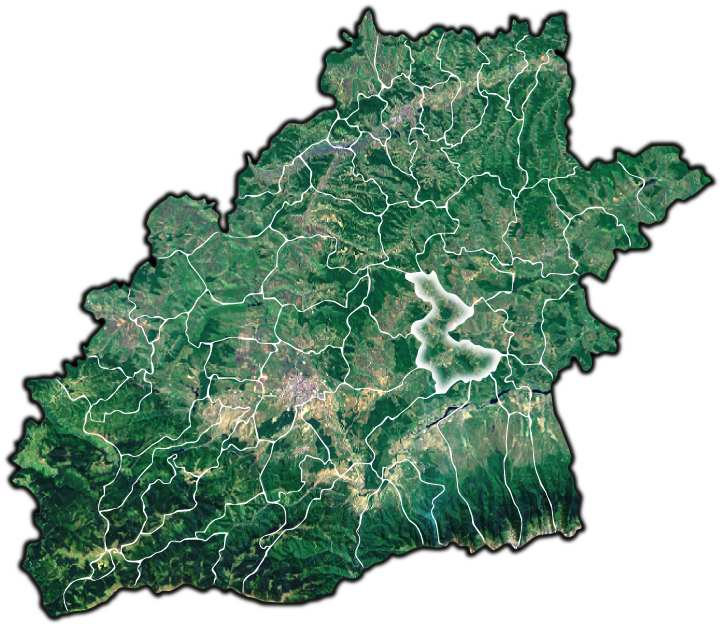
- Location in Sibiu County

- Location in Romania
- Coordinates: 45°53′44″N 24°27′19″E
- Country: Romania
- County: Sibiu

Government
  - Mayor (2024–2028): Adrian Mușoaie (PSD)
- Area: 112.59 km^{2} (43.47 sq mi)
- Elevation: 432 m (1,417 ft)
- Population (2021-12-01): 3,188
  - Density: 28.32/km^{2} (73.34/sq mi)
- Time zone: UTC+02:00 (EET)
  - Summer (DST): UTC+03:00 (EEST)
- Postal code: 557165
- Area code: +(40) 0269
- Vehicle reg.: SB
- Website: www.nocrich.ro

Nocrich (German: Leschkirch; Transylvanian Saxon: Leuskyrch; Hungarian: Újegyház) is a commune in Sibiu County, Romania, in the region of Transylvania. The commune is situated between Agnita and Sibiu. It is composed of five villages: Fofeldea (Hochfeld, Fófeld), Ghijasa de Jos (Untergesäß, Alsógezés), Hosman (Holzmengen, Holcmány), Nocrich, and Țichindeal (Ziegenthal, Cikendál). Nocrich and Hosman have fortified churches.

It is the site of the St. Ladislaus Baroque church (with many surviving Romanesque elements, dating from previous buildings).

== History ==
In 1910, the Agnita to Sibiu railway line was completed with stations at Nocrich, Țichindeal and Hosman. However, the line was closed in 2001. An active restoration group has since been formed aiming to restore the entire line to working condition.

== People ==
- Teodor Aaron (1803–1867), Greek Catholic clergyman and historian
- Samuel von Brukenthal (1721–1803), Habsburg governor of the Grand Principality of Transylvania, 1774–1787
- August Treboniu Laurian (1810–1881), politician, historian, and linguist
