= Constanța railway station =

Railway station in Constanţa, Romania

Constanţa
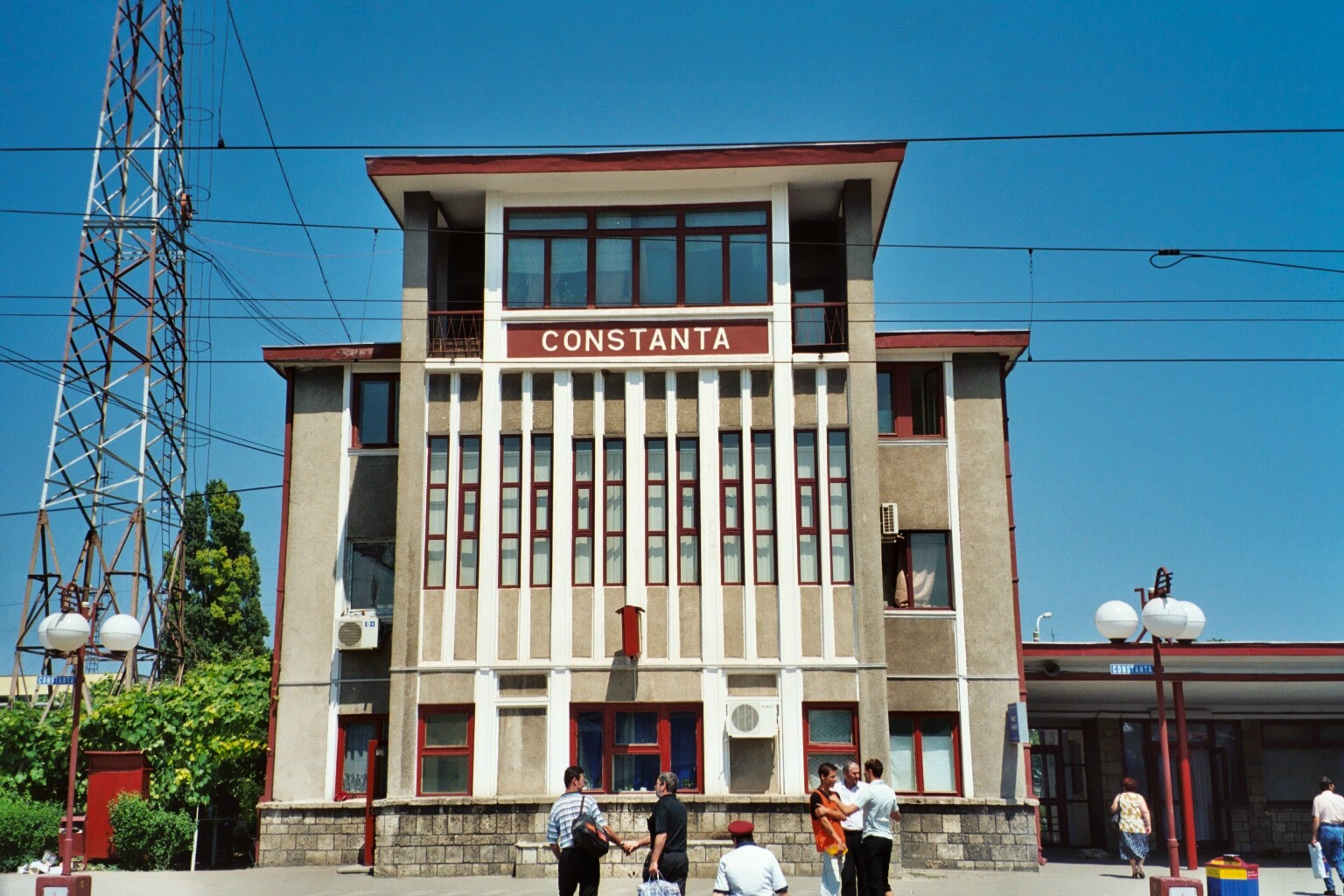
- View of the station

General information
- Location: Constanţa, Romania
- Coordinates: 44°10′08″N 28°37′51″E
- Owner: CFR
- Lines: Constanța–Bucharest; Constanța–Mangalia
- Platforms: 3
- Tracks: 5

History
- Opened: 20 May 1960
- Electrified: 31 May 1977
Location

Constanţa railway station is the largest station in Constanţa and on the Romanian Black Sea coast.

This station is situated on the main Căile Ferate Române Line 800 (Bucharest – Feteşti – Constanţa – Mangalia). Constanţa railway station is served by about 50 passenger trains. During summer, the number of trains and passengers greatly expands. Staff communication is facilitated via VHF Radios, frequency 146.225 AM.

The station is served by several bus and minibuses lines. The latest ro:CT Bus S.A. bus leaves at 23:00 local time.

== Distance from other railway stations ==
=== Romania ===
- Arad (via Alba Iulia): 845 km
- Arad (via Craiova): 829 km
- Bacău: 381 km
- Baia Mare (via Comănești): 838 km
- Braşov (via București Nord): 391 km
- Brăila: 256 km
- Buzău: 208 km
- Cluj-Napoca (via București Nord): 722 km
- Craiova: 434 km
- Deva (via Craiova): 680 km
- Iaşi: 430 km
- Oradea: 875 km
- Piteşti: 333 km
- Sibiu: 540 km
- Suceava: 527 km
- Timișoara: 758 km

=== Europe ===
- Belgrade: 934 km
- Berlin: 2,125 km
- Budapest: 1,097 km
- Chişinău: 556 km
- Frankfurt am Main: 2,125 km
- Kyiv: 1,452 km
- Sofia: 764 km
- Venice: 1,948 km
- Wien: 1,370 km
