= Agnita railway line =

Railway line in Romania

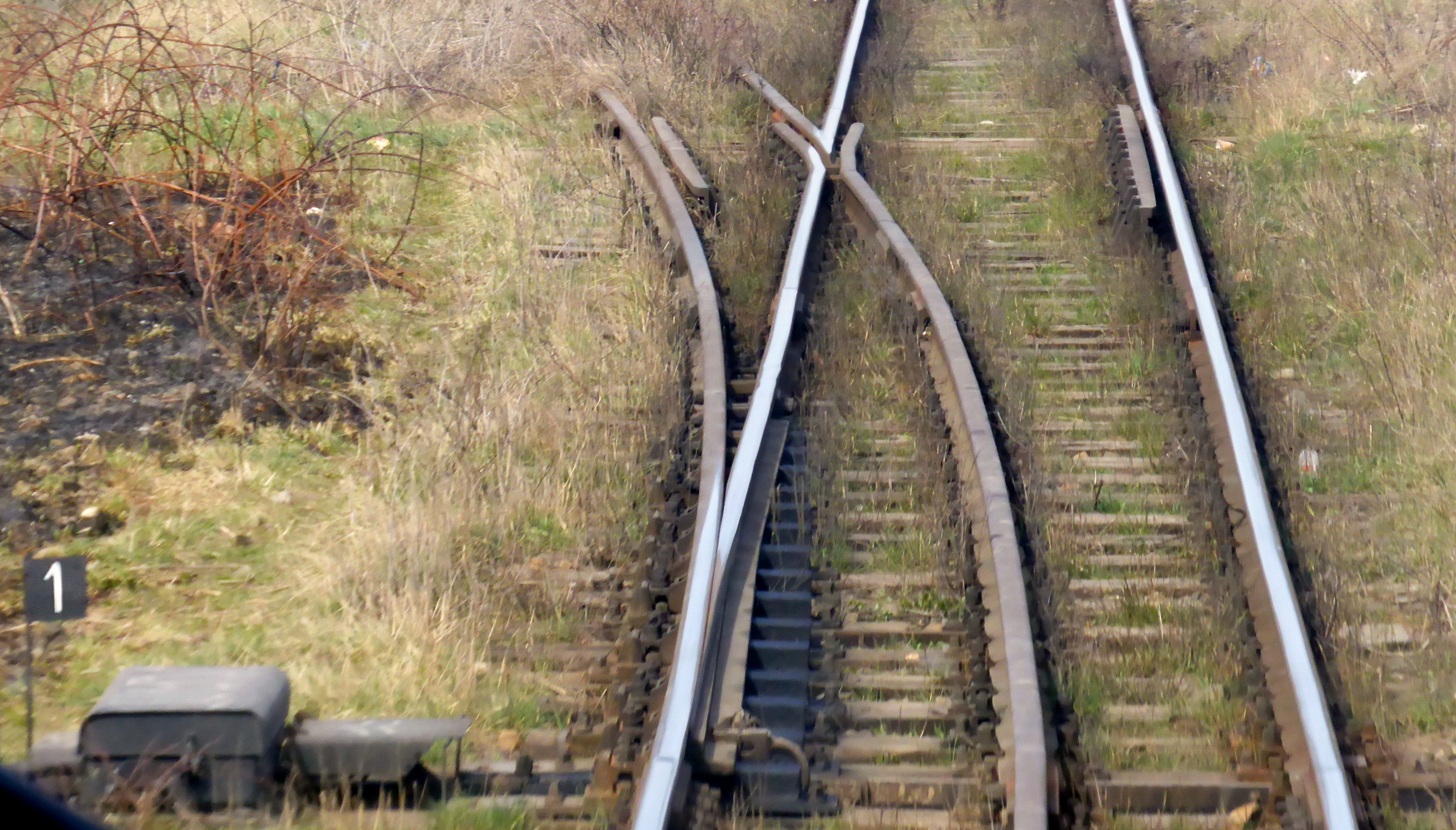
- The Agnita line joining the mainline.

Overview
- Status: Closed
- Owner: CFR Infrastructură
- Locale: Sibiu County, Romania; Historically also Mureș County
- Termini: Sighișoara; Sibiu
- Stations: 8 (Historically: 19)

Service
- Type: Narrow-gauge
- System: Căile Ferate Române
- Operator: CFR Călători

History
- Opened: 1898 & 1910
- Closed: 1965 & 2001

Technical
- Line length: Sibiu–Agnita 58 km (36 mi) (Historically: Sibiu–Sighișoara 109 km (68 mi))
- Num of tracks: 1
- Character: Rural Branch line
- Track gauge: 760 mm (2 ft 5 15/16 in) Bosnian gauge

The Agnita railway line was a 760 mm (2 ft 5 15/16 in) Bosnian gauge rail line in Sibiu County, Romania. Originally it ran from Sibiu railway station to Sighișoara in Mureș County. There also was a branch line to Vurpăr. However the final section from Sibiu to Agnita was closed in 2001. Căile Ferate Române (CFR) classed the line, along with the Vurpăr branch, as line 204 in the last years of operation. The Sibiu Steam Locomotives Museum holds the last remaining original locomotive from 1896.

== History ==
The line was originally built by the Sighișoara – Sibiu Local Railways Company which started work from Sighișoara in 1895 reaching Agnita by 1898 and Sibiu in 1910. The Vurpăr branch was opened at the same time as the Sibiu extension. As the line originally lay within Hungary, the Hungarian State Railways operated services until 1919, when Transylvania became part of Romania. CFR then continued to operate services until 1965 when the original section from Sighișoara to Agnita was closed. In 1993 the Vurpăr branch line was closed, with the rest of the line following in 2001.

== Reopening ==
Societatea Feroviară de Turism (SFT) originally planned to reopen the line as a tourist route but plans were shelved in 2006. After threats from CFR Infrastructură that track would be lifted all the rail infrastructure became protected as a historic monument in 2008.

Currently there is an active project called Asociația Prietenii Mocăniței ("Friends of the Narrow-gauge railway") and aimed at restoring the line for tourist operation; it operates occasional tourist steam trains on parts of the line.

The first steam event took place in Agnita in 2010 on the occasion of the Sibiu extension's centenary. There was a second event in September 2015 with special trains running from Cornățel station.

== Bibliography ==
- Lacriţeanu, Șerban (1995). "The Narrow Gauge Lines of the Romanian State Railway (CFR)". In Keith Chester (ed.). East European narrow gauge. Clevedon (UK): Channel View Publications. pp. 82–94. ISBN 1-873150-04-0.
- Engelbert, Paul (2011). Schmalspurig durch Ungarn II: die ehemals ungarischen Gebiete (in German). Malmö: Stenvalls. ISBN 978-91-7266-177-6.
