= Zlagna =

Zlagna may refer to several places in Romania:

- Banat
  - Zlagna, a village in Turnu Ruieni Commune, Caraș-Severin County
  - Zlagna, a tributary of the Timiș in Caraș-Severin County
- Transylvania
  - Zlagna, a village in Bârghiș Commune, Sibiu County
  - Zlagna (Hârtibaciu), a river in Sibiu County
