= Pelișor =

Pelișor may refer to several entities in Romania:

- The Pelișor Castle
- Pelișor, a village in Lazuri Commune, Satu Mare County
- Pelișor, a village in Bârghiș Commune, Sibiu County
- Pelișor River, a tributary of the Bârghiș River

== See also ==
- Peleș (disambiguation)
