= Erika Paulas =

Swiss-born architect, builder and feminist

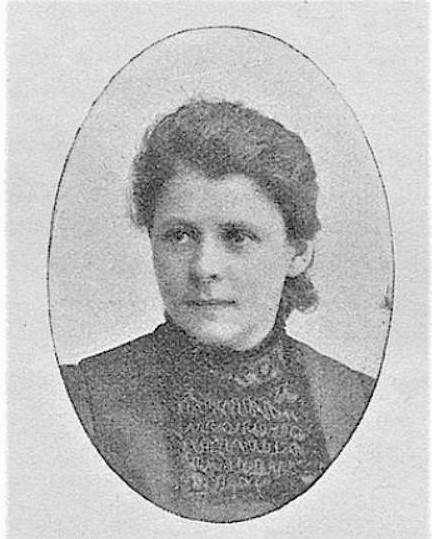
- Born: 10 January 1875
- Died: 1944?
- Occupation: Architect

Erika Mária Irene Paulas (1875, Zurich – 1944?) was a Swiss-born architect, builder, and feminist of Transylvanian-Saxon descent. She was the first female to pass the master builder's exam given by the University of Budapest, in 1900, and so is considered Hungary's first female architect.

== Early life ==
Erika Paulas was born on 10 January 1875 in Zürich, Switzerland to Josef Ernst Paulas, and his wife Elise (née Wettstein). Her father was an engineer specializing in hydraulic structures. He moved the family to Bistrița, in what was then the Kingdom of Hungary within Austria-Hungary, in 1883 in order to assume the job of chief civil engineer. He began teaching his daughter, who reportedly showed a great talent for drawing and math, through lessons as well as professional construction knowledge while she attended primary and secondary education.

== Career ==
In 1892, she started working as a draftsperson in the municipal construction office at Bistrița. In 1895, she passed the master bricklayer exam in Cluj. Following this accomplishment, she spent time in Zurich, attending lectures in architecture at the Zurich Polytechnic, and working in architecture offices. She also campaigned for women's rights, co-founding the Association for Women's Acquisition in 1896. During this period she also started her own practice in Bistrița, employing 8 people, reportedly all women, by 1898. By 1900, she was credited with 12 buildings. While women were not yet officially allowed to receive university training in architecture here, Paulas’ experience allowed her to not only write the official architect's examinations, but to be exempt from the theoretical portion. On 17 April 1900 she passed the architecture exam in Budapest, and was declared by Béla Neÿ, the president of the examinations committee, to be the first Hungarian qualified woman architect. When she proceeded to attempt to enter the Hungarian Society of Engineers and Architects, her application was initially unsuccessful, prompting the modification of existing gender-biased statutes; she became a member the next year, after long discussions during the general meeting of 1901. Paulas’ work has been contextualized within the Art Nouveau style of the time.

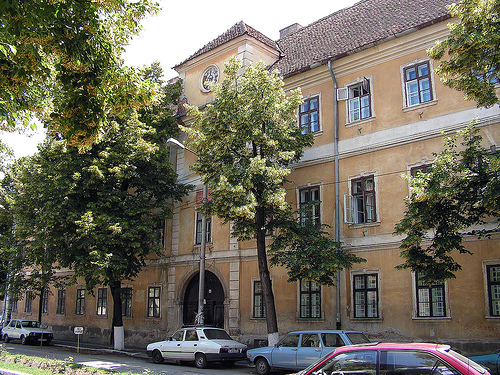
Reformed College in Cluj designed by Erika Paulas

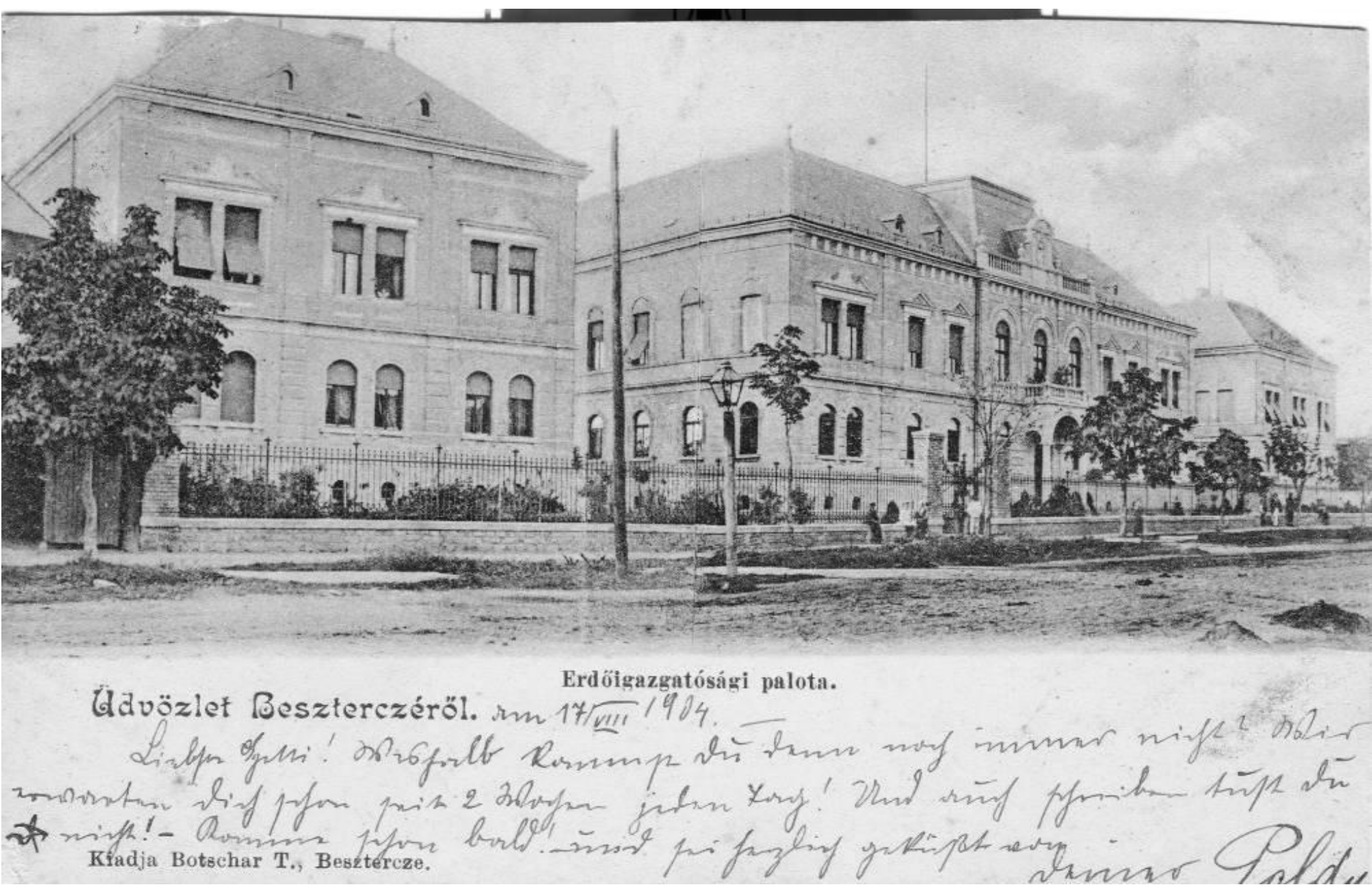
Rendering of Forestry Directorate in Bistrița by architect Erika Paulas

== Significant works ==
Paulas won a competition to build a palace for the Forestry Directorate in Bistrița in 1900. Following this, she was parodied in the popular Viennese magazine, “Weiner Caricaturen” through a drawing of a scantily clad woman bearing the title “Miss Architect.” In 1901 she won another competition for the construction of the city hospital in Mediaș.

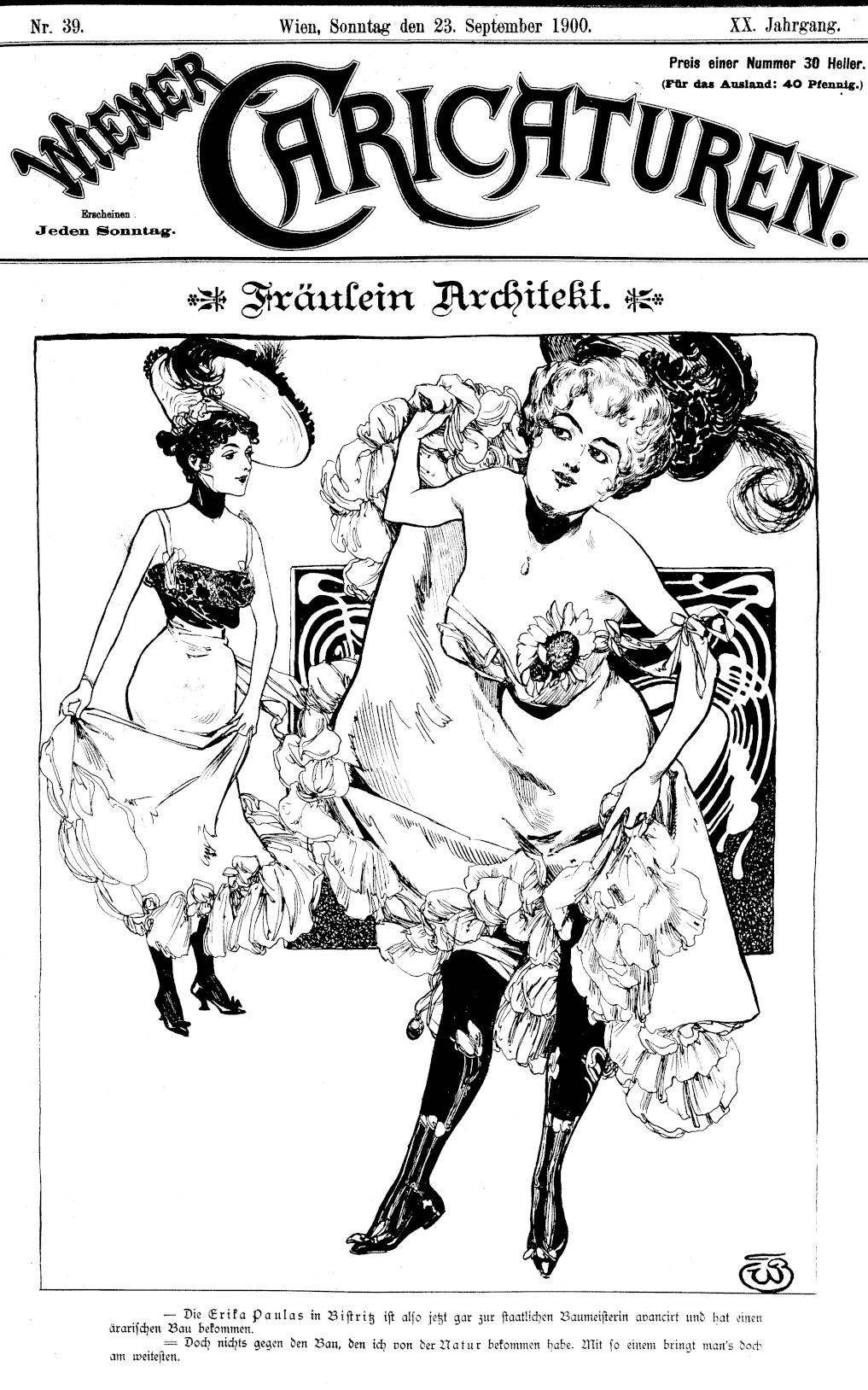
Cover of Weiner Caricaturen, a popular Viennese magazine, from September 23, 1900

Paulas’ best known building, perhaps because it still exists, was built for the Reformed college in Cluj between 1901 and 1902. It holds 12 classrooms, laboratories, and a museum, which currently holds the Gheorghe Șincai National College. It is described by Hungarian art historian Dániel Kovács:

The main street facade of the U-shaped, basement+floor+2-story building has 3+6+3+6+3 window axes; its squared ground floor has Corinthian pilastered risals, which are crowned with a tympanum in the middle and are placed forward on the sides and in the middle. The facade is subtly classicizing, thereby simultaneously referring to the style of the previous school buildings and fitting into the historicizing cityscape of the time.

== Later life and legacy ==
On 29 June 1902 Paulas married Rudolf Albert Schuller (22 May 1973 - 1944?). After this point, her activities stop being reported on in the newspapers. Her husband was a member of the constituency of Agnita beginning in 1905; during the same period she was the chairperson of the Sibiu child protection agency. In 1914, she resigned her position and the couple appeared back in Bistrița—he as a member of the German-Saxon National Council; she, a little later, as a committee member of an evangelical women's association between 1917 and 1919.

In 1944, during the Hungarian evacuation of Northern Transylvania, records show that the couple did not leave Bistrița and lost their pension rights. No further information about them appears in census records.

Erika Paulas is remembered as a pioneer in a male-dominated field before women were able to access architectural training through universities.
