= Valea Rorii River =

Valea Rorii River may refer to:

- Valea Rorii, a tributary of the river Balta in Romania
- Rora, a tributary of the Albac in Sibiu County, Romania
