= Peleș (disambiguation) =

Peleș Castle is a Neo-Renaissance castle in the Carpathian Mountains, Romania.

Peleș may also refer to:

- Peleș (river), a tributary of the Prahova in Romania
- Peleș Sporting Association
- Peleș, a village in Sohodol Commune, Alba County, Romania
- Peleș, a village in Lazuri Commune, Satu Mare County, Romania

== See also ==
- Peles (disambiguation)
- Peleșel, a tributary of the river Peleș in Romania
- Pelișor (disambiguation)
