= Zăvoi (disambiguation) =

Zăvoi may refer to the following places in Romania:

- Zăvoi, a commune in Caraș-Severin County
- Zăvoi, a village in Ștefănești town, Argeș County
- Zăvoi, a village in Sălașu de Sus Commune, Hunedoara County
- Zăvoi (river), a tributary of the Hârtibaciu in Sibiu County
