= Valea Înfundăturii =

- Location within Romania

Location
- Country: Romania
- Counties: Sibiu County
- Villages: Ruja

Physical characteristics
- Mouth: Hârtibaciu
  - coordinates: 46.0015°N 24.6731°E
- Length: 9 km (5.6 mi)
- Basin size: 21 km^{2} (8.1 sq mi)

Basin features
- Progression: Hârtibaciu→ Cibin→ Olt→ Danube→ Black Sea

The Valea Înfundăturii is a right tributary of the river Hârtibaciu in Romania. It flows into the Hârtibaciu near Agnita. Its length is 9 km (5.6 mi) and its basin size is 21 km^{2} (8.1 sq mi).
