= Liviu Constantinescu =

Romanian geophysicist

Liviu Constantinescu (26 November 1914 – 29 November 1997) was a Romanian geophysicist, professor of geophysics, member of the Romanian Academy. He was the cofounder, together with Sabba S. Ștefănescu, of the Romanian school of geophysics.

== Biography ==
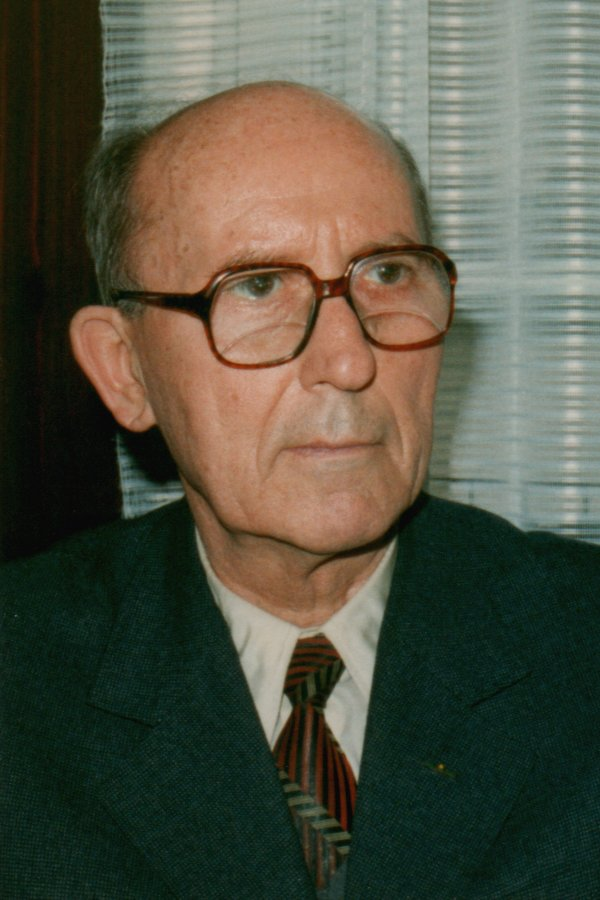
Liviu Constantinescu

He was born in Ighișu Vechi, Transylvania (a village now in Sibiu County), the son of Romulus Constantinescu, a sixth-generation Christian Orthodox cleric. After graduating from the Prince Nicholas High School in Sighișoara, Constantinescu ignored suggestions from family and teachers to become an engineer or teacher and decided to study natural sciences. He earned a master's degree in physics and chemistry (1935) and a doctor's degree in physics (1941) from the University of Bucharest. When Romania entered World War II in 1941 on the side of the Axis, he was conscripted and sent to the Eastern Front, where he managed to escape the encircling of the Romanian Army at the Battle of Stalingrad.

After a few years as teaching assistant at the Department of Sciences of his alma mater (1937–1943), he was appointed director of the newly founded Geophysical Observatory Surlari, named today National Geomagnetic Observatory Surlari "Liviu Constantinescu" (1943–1958); this started his career as a geophysicist. He was appointed professor (1949–1975) at a newly created Department of Geophysics, led by Ștefănescu and later by Constantinescu himself, and also taught at the University of Bucharest. In parallel, he directed geophysical research at various institutes of earth sciences of the Romanian Academy (1959–1970). In 1973 he obtained a Ph.D. in physics from the Scuola Normale Superiore di Pisa. Discriminated politically for his repeated refusal to join the ruling Communist Party, he was forced into early retirement at age 60 (1975); he came back after the fall of the dictatorship, fifteen years later. In 1990 he was elected full member of the Romanian Academy (he had been a corresponding member since 1963) and president of its Section of Geonomic Sciences (1990–1994). Until his definitive retirement (1995), he devoted himself to rebuilding the Romanian Academy and the geophysical institutions in Romania; he was president of the Romanian National Committee of Geodesy and Geophysics and of the Romanian Society of Geophysics.

Constantinescu has made important contributions to several domains of pure and applied geophysics: geomagnetism (normal distribution and secular variation of the main geomagnetic field, general morphology and particularities of magnetic perturbations, magnetotellurics); handling and interpretation of gravimetric and magnetometric data (analytic continuation of potential fields, effects of Earth tides, time variation of the gravity field); seismology and tectonophysics (focal mechanism of earthquakes, seismicity and seismotectonics, Carpathian earthquakes, and seismicity of the Romanian territory).

He was member of the study group on Seismic methods for monitoring underground explosions at the Stockholm International Peace Research Institute (SIPRI) (1968–1970); member and vice-president of the coordination committee of the UNDP/UNESCO project for the study of the seismicity of the Balkan region (1970–1977). He held important positions in international scientific organizations: vice-president of the International Union of Geodesy and Geophysics (IUGG) (1969–1971) and member of the Bureau of IUGG (1967–1975); member of the governing council of the International Seismological Centre (1970–1974) and of the council of the European Geophysical Society (1970–1975); vice-president of the European Seismological Commission (1972–1976).

An academic equally familiar with natural sciences and humanities, Constantinescu was a teacher for many. For 25 years, he gave lectures on geomagnetism and magnetic prospecting, gravimetry and gravimetric prospecting, radioactive prospecting, and seismology. He was editor and coauthor of the textbook Exploration Geophysics (Prospecțiuni geofizice) (1964–1965); he wrote the section The Earth (Terra) of the Italian Enciclopedia del Novecento (1975–1990).

He died in Saint-Louis, Alsace, at age 83; a memorial service was held at St. Bessarion Church in Bucharest.
