= Ighișu =

Ighișu ( 'the Ighiș' ) may refer to one of two places in Sibiu County, Romania:

- Ighișu Nou (New Ighiș), a village in Mediaș city
- Ighișu Vechi (Old Ighiș), a village in Bârghiș Commune
