= Scharosch =

Scharosch is the German name for two places in Romania:

- Șoarș, a commune in Brașov County (Scharosch bei Fogarasch)
- Șaroș pe Târnave, a village in Dumbrăveni town, Sibiu County (Scharosch an der Kokel)
