= Coveș =

- Location within Romania

Location
- Country: Romania
- Counties: Sibiu County
- Villages: Coveș

Physical characteristics
- Mouth: Hârtibaciu
  - location: Coveș
  - coordinates: 45.9604°N 24.5856°E
- Length: 14 km (8.7 mi)
- Basin size: 31 km^{2} (12 sq mi)

Basin features
- Progression: Hârtibaciu→ Cibin→ Olt→ Danube→ Black Sea

The Coveș is a right tributary of the river Hârtibaciu in Romania. It discharges into the Hârtibaciu near Agnita. Its length is 14 km (8.7 mi) and its basin size is 31 km^{2} (12 sq mi).

== See also ==
- Protected areas of Romania
