= Marpod =

- Commune
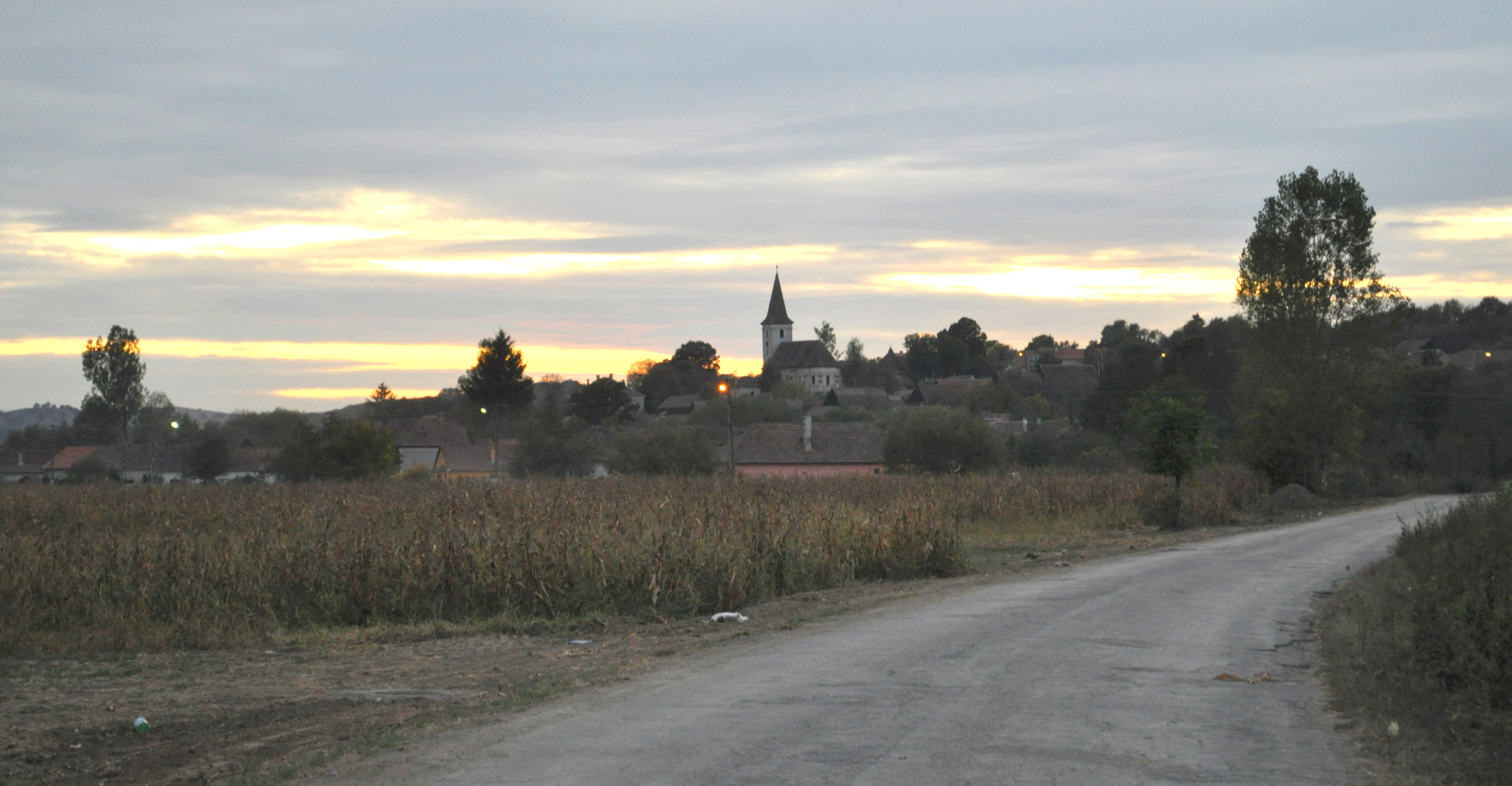
- View of Marpod

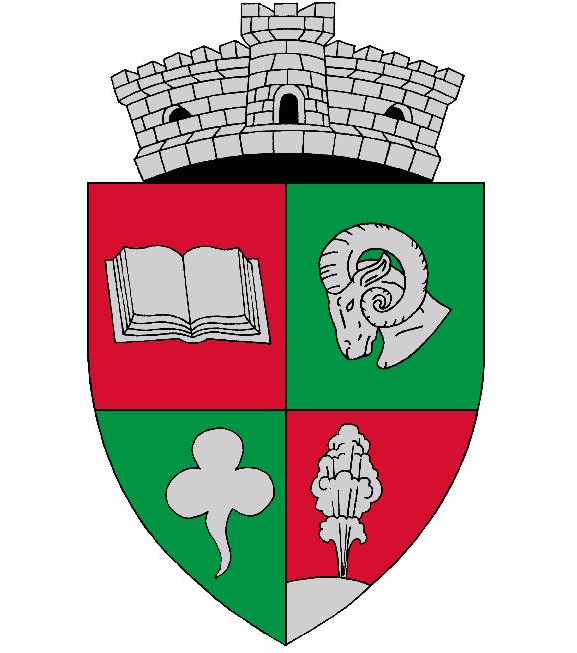
- Coat of arms

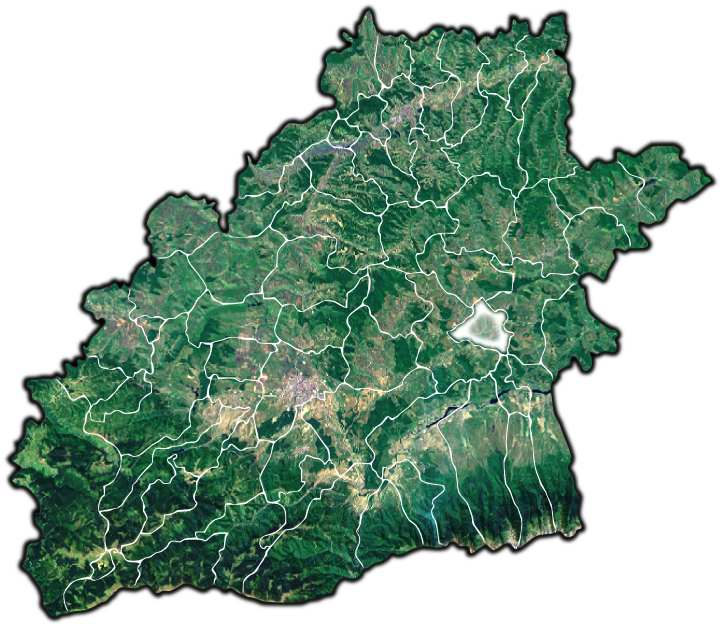
- Location in Sibiu County

- Location in Romania
- Coordinates: 45°52′N 24°30′E
- Country: Romania
- County: Sibiu

Government
  - Mayor (2024–2028): Sebastian Ioan Dotcoș (PSD)
- Area: 41.91 km^{2} (16.18 sq mi)
- Elevation: 442 m (1,450 ft)
- Population (2021-12-01): 982
  - Density: 23.4/km^{2} (60.7/sq mi)
- Time zone: UTC+02:00 (EET)
  - Summer (DST): UTC+03:00 (EEST)
- Postal code: 557135
- Area code: +(40) 269
- Vehicle reg.: SB
- Website: primariamarpod.ro

Marpod (German: Marpod; Hungarian: Márpod) is a commune located in Sibiu County, Transylvania, Romania. It is composed of two villages, Ilimbav (Eulenbach; Illenbák) and Marpod.

The commune is located in the eastern part of the county, 34 km (21 mi) from the county seat, Sibiu, and 58 km (36 mi) from Făgăraș. The river Marpod flows through both Ilimbav and Marpod villages.

The first underground gas storage facility in Romania was built in 1958 at Ilimbav.
