= Peles =

Peles may refer to:

- Goran Peleš, Bosnian-Herzegovinian footballer
- Keren Peles (Hebrew: קרן פלס; born 1979), Israeli female singer-songwriter and pianist
- Rafael Peles, Israeli sports shooter
- Peles (river), a river in Perm Krai, Russia
- Peleș (disambiguation)
