= Valea Morii (Hârtibaciu) =

- Location within Romania

Location
- Country: Romania
- Counties: Brașov, Sibiu
- Villages: Seliștat, Movile

Physical characteristics
- Mouth: Hârtibaciu
  - coordinates: 46.0485°N 24.7697°E
- Length: 18 km (11 mi)
- Basin size: 39 km^{2} (15 sq mi)

Basin features
- Progression: Hârtibaciu→ Cibin→ Olt→ Danube→ Black Sea

The Valea Morii is a left tributary of the river Hârtibaciu in Romania. It flows into the Hârtibaciu west of Noiștat. Its length is 18 km (11 mi) and its basin size is 39 km^{2} (15 sq mi).
