= Marpod (river) =

- Location within Romania

Location
- Country: Romania
- Counties: Sibiu County
- Villages: Ilimbav, Marpod

Physical characteristics
- Mouth: Hârtibaciu
  - coordinates: 45.8632°N 24.4565°E
- Length: 8 km (5.0 mi)
- Basin size: 30 km^{2} (12 sq mi)

Basin features
- Progression: Hârtibaciu→ Cibin→ Olt→ Danube→ Black Sea

The Marpod is a left tributary of the river Hârtibaciu in Romania. It flows into the Hârtibaciu near the village Marpod. Its length is 8 km (5.0 mi) and its basin size is 30 km^{2} (12 sq mi).
