= Bârghiș (river) =

Bârghiș Pelișor
- Location within Romania

Location
- Country: Romania
- Counties: Sibiu County
- Villages: Pelișor, Bârghiș

Physical characteristics
- Mouth: Hârtibaciu
  - coordinates: 45.9571°N 24.5685°E
- Length: 16 km (9.9 mi)
- Basin size: 63 km^{2} (24 sq mi)

Basin features
- Progression: Hârtibaciu→ Cibin→ Olt→ Danube→ Black Sea
- Tributaries
  - left: Apoș

The Bârghiș (also: Pelișor) is a right tributary of the river Hârtibaciu in Romania. It flows into the Hârtibaciu west of Agnita. Its length is 16 km (9.9 mi) and its basin size is 63 km^{2} (24 sq mi).
