= Mircea Eliade National College (Sighișoara) =

Romanian high school

Coordinates: 46.2194°N 24.7965°E

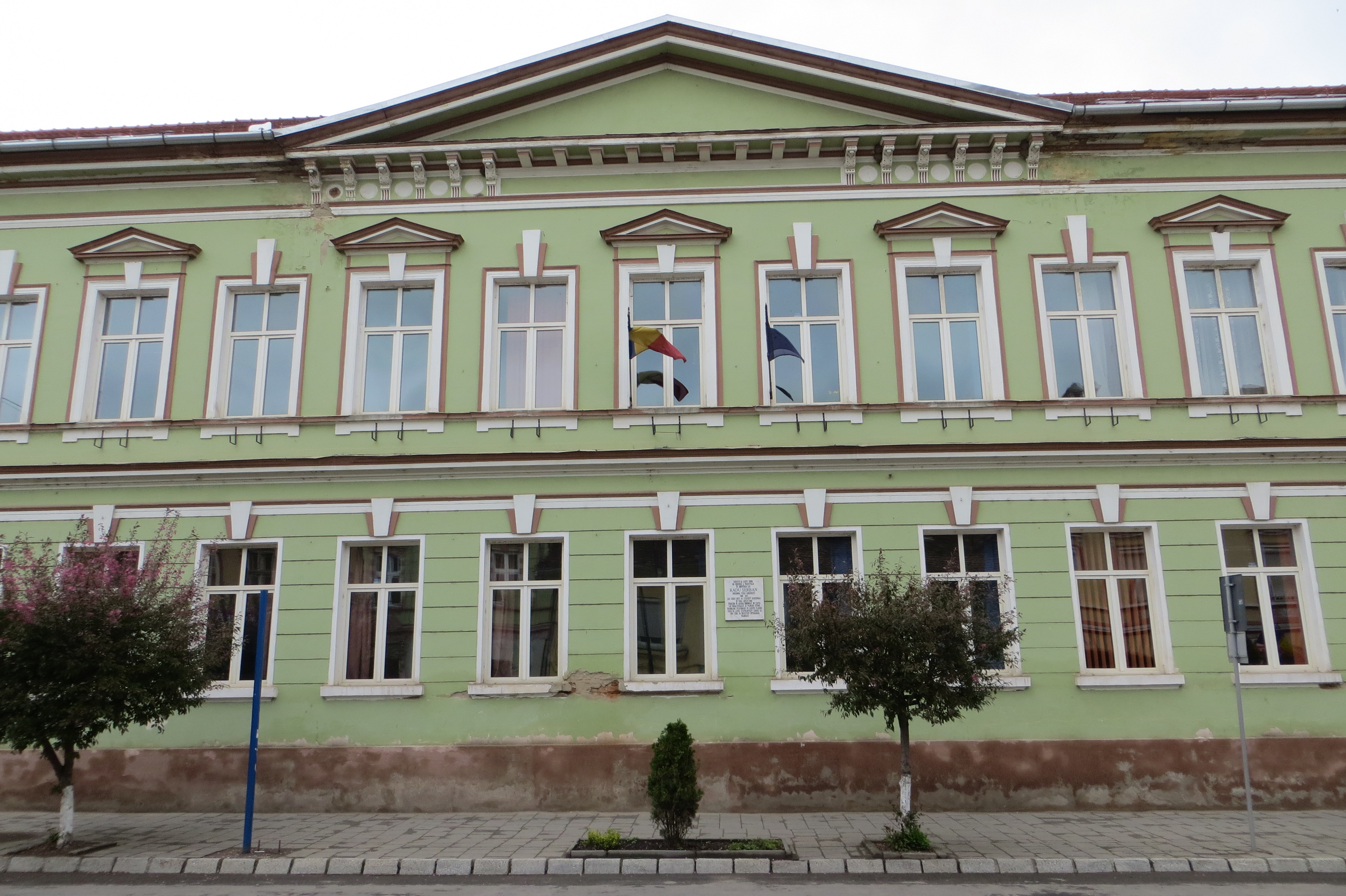
Mircea Eliade National College

Mircea Eliade National College (Romanian: Colegiul Național Mircea Eliade) is a high school located at 1 Decembrie Street #31, Sighișoara, Romania.

== History ==
The school opened in September 1923; it was the first Romanian-language boys’ high school in Sighișoara. Its establishment came five years after the union of Transylvania with Romania, amidst a concerted effort to open Romanian schools in the province, with a view toward building a Romanian elite there and consolidating control. The school project drew support from local authorities, two senators and one deputy for Târnava Mare County and some of the leading local Romanians, as seen from the composition of the first school committee. It initially welcomed 180 students in five grades, which later rose to eight. The new school was named after Prince Nicholas. The building, still in use, dates to 1880 and was previously a Hungarian state primary school. From its early years, it contributed to local Romanian cultural life, for example holding festivities on national holidays. By 1927, there were fourteen teachers. Nearly all came from outside the town, where Transylvanian Saxons were dominant and which lacked a native Romanian intellectual class.

In 1948, after the establishment of a communist regime, the old name was dropped. Girls were admitted in 1956, and a Hungarian section was introduced in 1960. In 1977, it became an industrial high school. In the early 1980s, the attractive interwar-era gym was torn down and much of the schoolyard ceded in order to build apartment blocks. In 1990, following the Romanian Revolution, the school was named after Mircea Eliade, and its focus shifted to informatics, sciences and the humanities; the Hungarian section remained. It was declared a national college in 2004. In the 2022–2023 school year, there were 53 teachers for 568 students in 23 classes.

The school building is listed as a historic monument by Romania's Ministry of Culture and Religious Affairs.

== Alumni ==
- Liviu Constantinescu
- Gheorghe Mihăilă
- Radu Popa
