= Brădeni =

- Commune
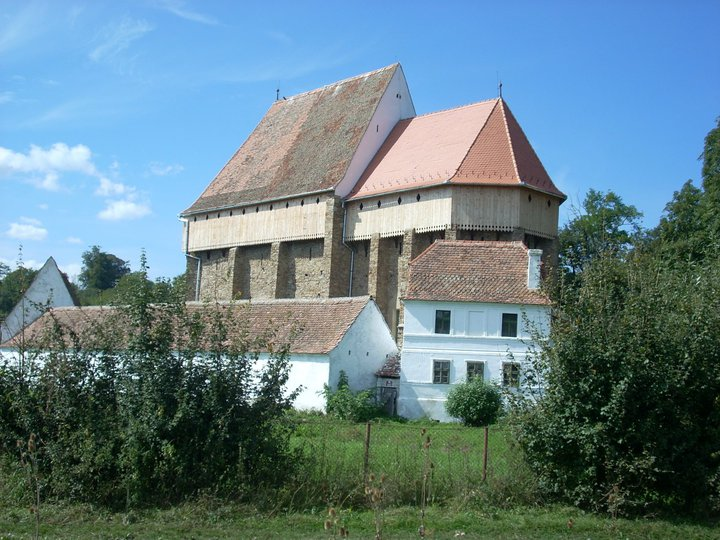
- Fortified church of Brădeni

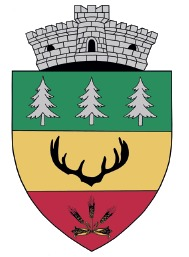
- Coat of arms

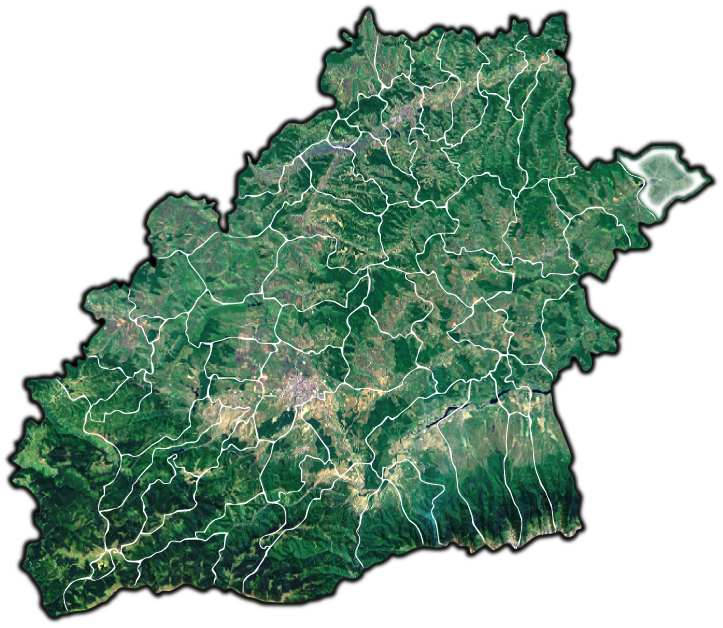
- Location in Sibiu County

- Location in Romania
- Coordinates: 46°5′N 24°50′E
- Country: Romania
- County: Sibiu
- Area: 80.6 km^{2} (31.1 sq mi)
- Elevation: 482 m (1,581 ft)
- Population (2021-12-01): 1,368
  - Density: 17.0/km^{2} (44.0/sq mi)
- Time zone: UTC+02:00 (EET)
  - Summer (DST): UTC+03:00 (EEST)
- Postal code: 557060
- Area code: (+40) 02 69
- Vehicle reg.: SB
- Website: www.comunabradeni.ro

Brădeni (German: Henndorf; Hungarian: Hégen) is a commune located in Sibiu County, Transylvania, Romania. It is composed of three villages: Brădeni, Retiș (Retersdorf; Réten) and Țeline (Woßling; Pusztacelina).

== Geography ==
The commune is located in the northeastern part of Sibiu County, on the border with the Mureș and Brașov counties. It lies in the middle of the Transylvanian Plateau, on the banks of the river Hârtibaciu.

County road DJ106 connects Brădeni to the county seat, Sibiu, 82 km (51 mi) to the southwest, and to Sighișoara, 23 km (14 mi) to the north. County road DJ104D leads to Făgăraș, 38 km (24 mi) to the south.

== Architecture ==
A hall-shaped Lutheran church was erected by the local Transylvanian Saxon community in the 14th century.

== Natives ==
- László Lőrinczi (1919–2001), poet, journalist, and translator
- Remus Răduleț (1904–1984), electrical engineer
