= Sabba S. Ștefănescu =

Sabba S. Ștefănescu (20 July 1902 – 15 April 1994) was a Romanian geophysicist, professor of geophysics, member of the Romanian Academy. He was the cofounder, together with Liviu Constantinescu, of the Romanian school of geophysics.

== Biography ==
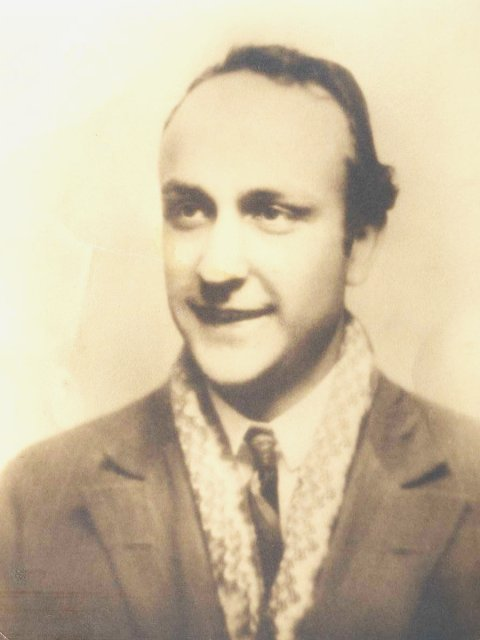
Sabba S. Ștefănescu

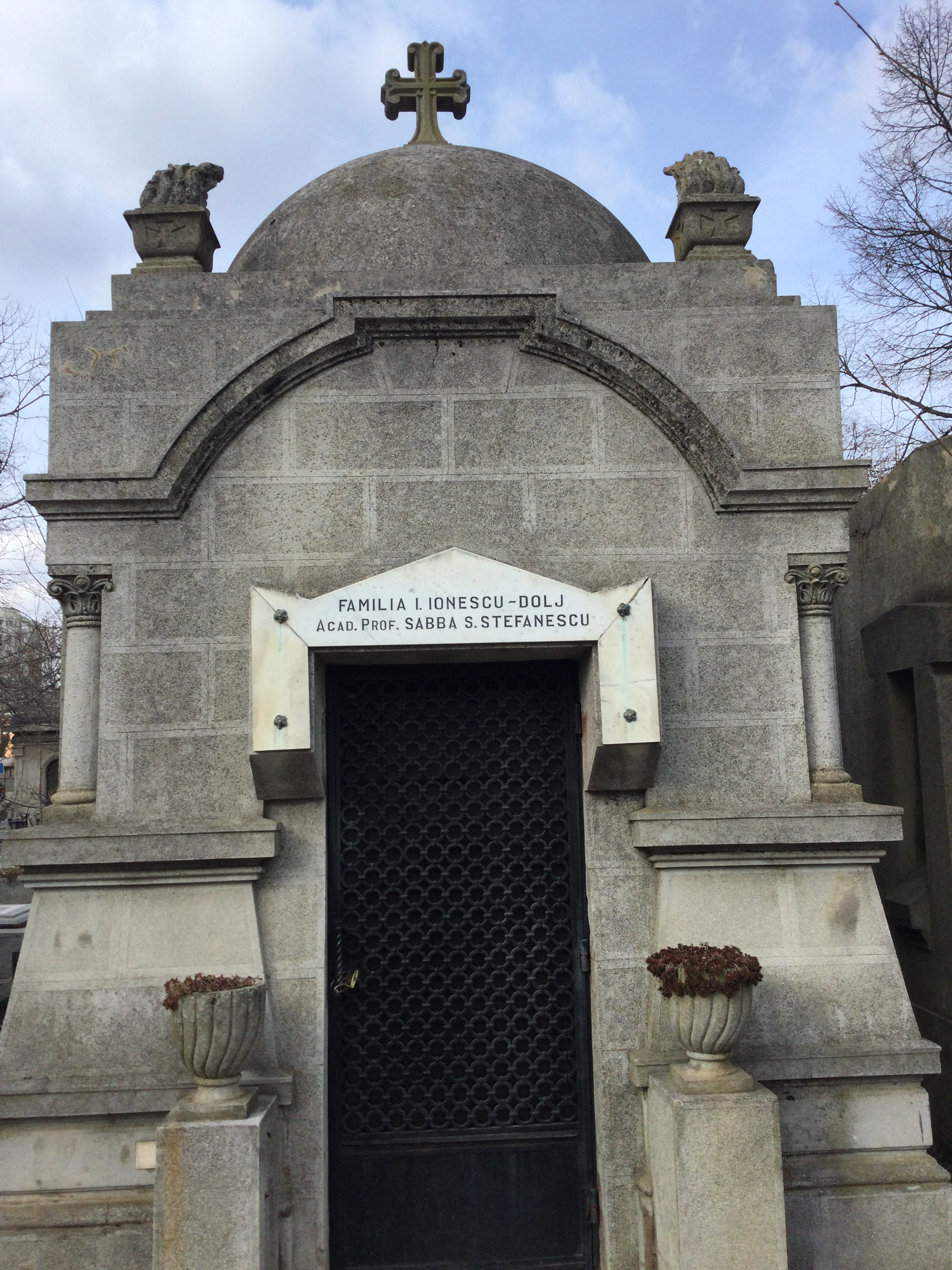
Crypt in Bellu Cemetery

He was the third and youngest son of Sabba Ștefănescu, professor of paleontology at the University of Bucharest, and of his wife Constanța. He received at first a private education, then attended for a couple of years the Saint Sava College in Bucharest, but left the country together with his family in 1917 for Paris, where his father had to accomplish a diplomatic mission. He obtained there his baccalauréat at the Lycée Saint-Louis and was admitted as a student at the prestigious École des Mines, from which he graduated in 1923. He returned subsequently to Romania, where he worked for some time in the mining district of the Jiu Valley. In 1927 he joined the Geological Institute of Romania, where he began his studies in electrical prospecting, which was to remain his lifelong preoccupation.

Two short papers of his drew the attention of the brothers Conrad and Marcel Schlumberger. They were at that time the pioneers of this field in Europe and had just founded the geophysical prospecting company bearing their name, which has developed since into the world leading Schlumberger Limited. Ștefănescu entered into a direct collaboration with them and spent the years 1929–1933 in Paris, a period which he considered to be the most fruitful of his scientific life. He returned to Romania in 1933 and resumed his work at the Geological Institute, being at the same time a consulting engineer of the Schlumberger company.

He received a doctor's degree in physics from the University of Bucharest (1945), was elected a corresponding member of the Romanian Academy (1946) and became head of the geophysical department of the Geological Committee (1950) and of a new Department of Geophysics at the Institute for Mining in Bucharest (subsequently transferred to the Institute for Oil, Gas and Geology); he retained these positions until his retirement in 1967. One may say that over that period the first generations of Romanian geophysicists were formed; he made an essential contribution to this. He was elected a full member of the Romanian Academy (1963), and president of its Section of Geological, Geophysical and Geographical Sciences (1966–1990). He was the director of several institutes of geophysics belonging to the Romanian Academy or to the Geological Committee, and was (until 1990) editor of the journal Revue roumaine de géologie, géophysique et géographie and president of the Romanian National Committee of Geodesy and Geophysics. He received in 1990 the honorary membership of the Society of Exploration Geophysicists "for developing the theoretical basis for several methods now in common use".

The midpoint of his scientific activity was the theory of electrical prospecting in geophysics. He was one of the first to perform a complete calculation in a realistic context (1930) of the electromagnetic field generated by a prospecting device and thus of the apparent resistivity of the ground. A series of subsequent papers (1930–1950) offered a detailed analysis of the usual DC and AC electrical prospecting methods. Later on he developed the theory of alpha media which allows an easy calculation of the electric field within a large family of models for the conductivity of the ground and facilitates the interpretation of the measured data. Another problem originating in electrical prospecting and to which he devoted for a long time his mathematical abilities was the determination of the magnetic field lines for various configurations of currents. He developed a special geometrical intuition which allowed him to integrate the complicated differential equations of the field lines of linear currents with increasingly complex arrangements. In this context he could produce explicit examples of open magnetic field lines.

To those who knew him, he was an amiable and reserved person, with a pleasant and distinguished conversation. He regarded an optimistic attitude of mind as a duty and conveyed his serene outlook to those surrounding him. He had a steady and intense curiosity in intellectual matters, including philosophy and arts. The clarity of his scientific discourse was impressive.
