= St. Bessarion Church =

Orthodox church in Bucharest, Romania

Coordinates: 44°26′55″N 26°05′44″E

St. Bessarion Church (Romanian: Biserica Sfântul Visarion) is the name given to two Romanian Orthodox churches located at 14 Visarion Street in Bucharest, Romania, close to Piața Romană. They are dedicated to Saint Bessarion II of Larissa.

== Old church ==
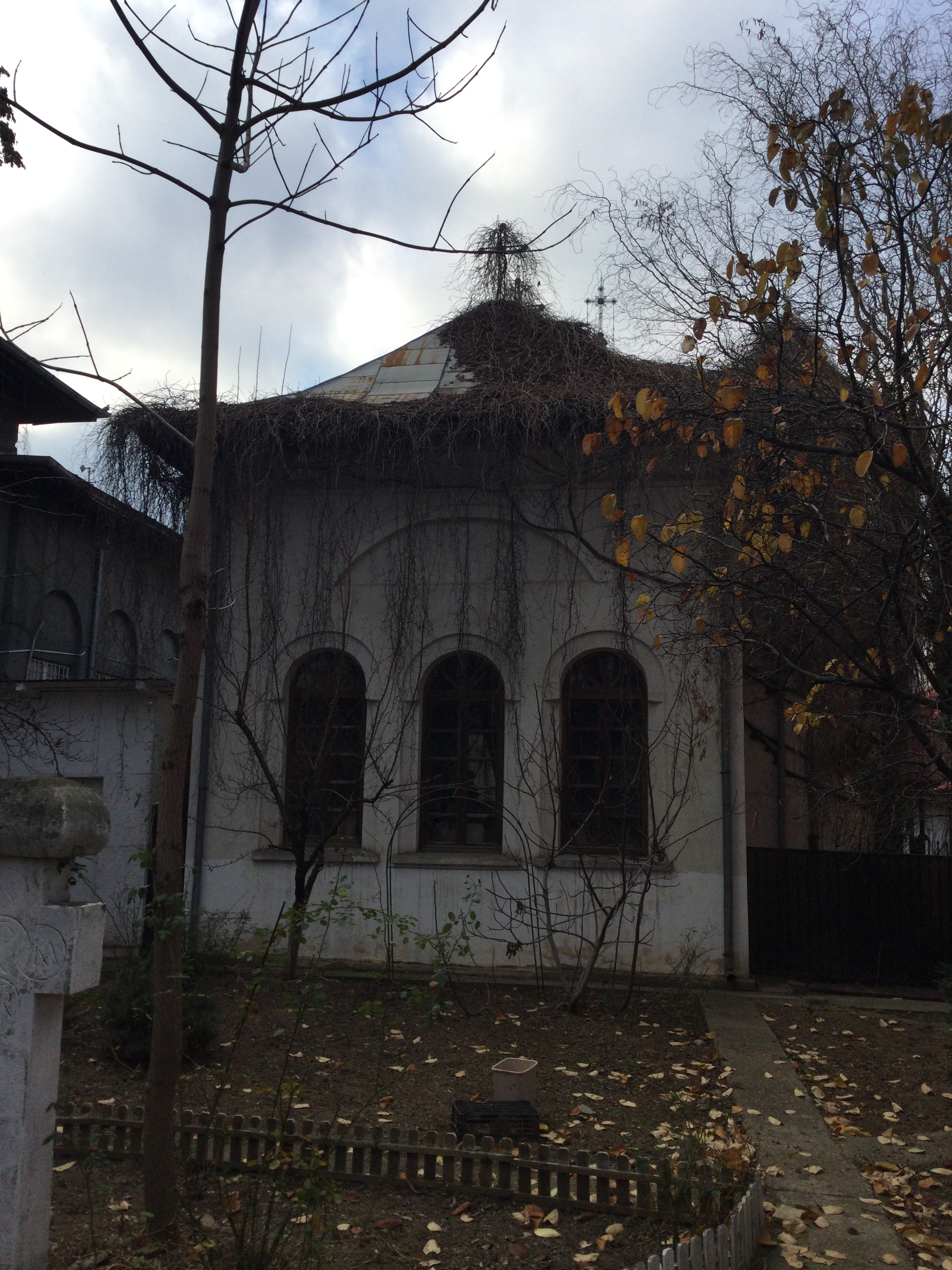
Old St. Bessarion Church

The old church was built, according to the pisanie, in 1797, by the archpriest of Bucharest and the private secretary to Prince Alexander Ypsilantis. It was dedicated to Saint Bessarion, protector against plague, during an epidemic, and was also consecrated to Saints Charalambos and Menas of Egypt. An earlier church on the site was built of wood, ship-shaped, with a polygonal altar apse. Archaeological evidence places its construction in the early 18th century. Several decades later, at an uncertain date, a masonry church of similar shape was built there. Two graves survive in the portico and narthex, the latter holding the remains of a certain Mihăilă, who died during the reign of Alexander Mourouzis (1793-1796). Austrian plans from around 1790 feature the building, which came to be known as Mihăilă's Church.

The 1797 church features a cross-shaped plan, with a bell tower above the narthex. The exterior was divided into two sections, the lower decorated with three-lobed arches, the upper with simple medallions. The surviving portion is in the post-Brâncovenesc style. Deteriorated fragments of decorations and icons survive from the old interior fresco painting. The stone frame of the entrance door, ornamented with floral motifs, as well as the pisanie above this, were artistically worked and well preserved. The 1838 earthquake severely damaged the church, cracking the ceilings and walls. It was repaired in 1838 and 1897, and used for services until 1913, when the new church was inaugurated. The old church then fell into ruin.

In 1964, the communist regime, without consulting the historic monuments directorate, ordered its demolition. The parish priest and an architect managed to save the portico, with its three well proportioned arches, the narthex and staircase tower, featuring important architectural elements; these were restored in 1965–1966. A new roof was built without domes. The wall that divided narthex from nave, with three arches resting on eight-sided stone columns, is now enclosed in protective metal. The demolished nave and altar were traced in concrete rising 20 centimeters above ground. A stone cross was placed on the site of the altar. The liturgical objects were taken to the new church, while the iconostasis and surrounding chairs were donated to the church in Siliștea Gumești. Another repair took place in 1999, with a view towards using the structure as a chapel.

The old church is listed as a historic monument by Romania's Ministry of Culture and Religious Affairs.

== New church ==
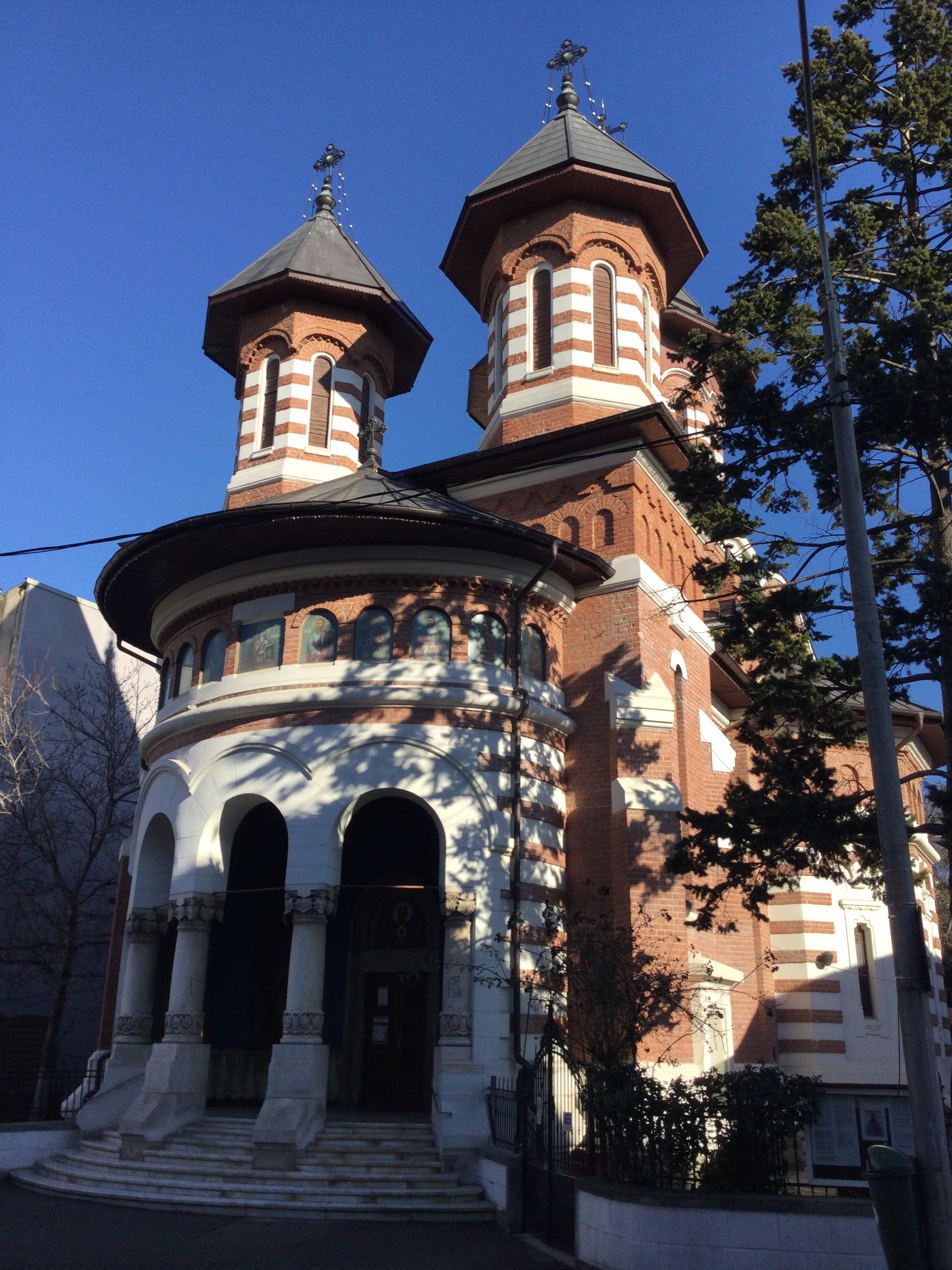
New St. Bessarion Church

The new church, located some 30 meters in front of the old one, carries an additional dedication, to Saints Constantine and Helena. The cornerstone was laid in 1910 and it was consecrated in 1913. The interior was painted in oil in 1912–1913. There are four ktetors' portraits, depicting Elena and Constantin Eraclide, Metropolitan Conon Arămescu-Donici and King Carol I. During a 1968 restoration, the portico paintings of Saints Bessarion and Calinic of Cernica were completed. The grave of Elena Eraclide, who died in 1922, is located to the right of the entrance, and covered by a baldachin carved in marble.

The cross-shaped church, covering an area of 230 square meters, measures 26 meters long by 11–16.5 meters wide. It combines the Byzantine Revival and Moldavian styles. The Pantocrator dome is larger than the two bell towers on the sides. A special element is the open, oval portico, with three tall arches on columns made of Vratsa stone, with floral capitals and bases, resting on high pedestals, the entrance stairs coming between. Panels on the portico walls are painted with icons of Saints Bessarion, Calinic, Peter and Paul. The entrance portal has an ornamented frame, above which sits the pisanie and a mosaic of the Madonna and Child.

The red brick facades are divided into two unequal sections by a simple string course. On the lower part, strips of plaster alternate with three rows of brick. The three octagonal domes are similarly designed; each has a pyramidal roof with eight sides. The upper facade has a frieze of small glass-covered recesses, painted with saints' icons. The area behind the portico has only brick, with buttresses on its four corners. Simple brick recesses are lined above the circular roof of the portico. The nave roof is coated in sheets of brass.
