= Albac (Hârtibaciu) =

- Location within Romania

Location
- Country: Romania
- Counties: Sibiu County
- Villages: Dealu Frumos, Vărd

Physical characteristics
- Mouth: Hârtibaciu
  - coordinates: 45.9499°N 24.5659°E
- Length: 28 km (17 mi)
- Basin size: 113 km^{2} (44 sq mi)

Basin features
- Progression: Hârtibaciu→ Cibin→ Olt→ Danube→ Black Sea
- Tributaries
  - left: Rora

The Albac is a left tributary of the river Hârtibaciu in Romania. It discharges into the Hârtibaciu west of the village Vărd. Its length is 28 km (17 mi) and its basin size is 113 km^{2} (44 sq mi).
