= Șoarș =

- Commune
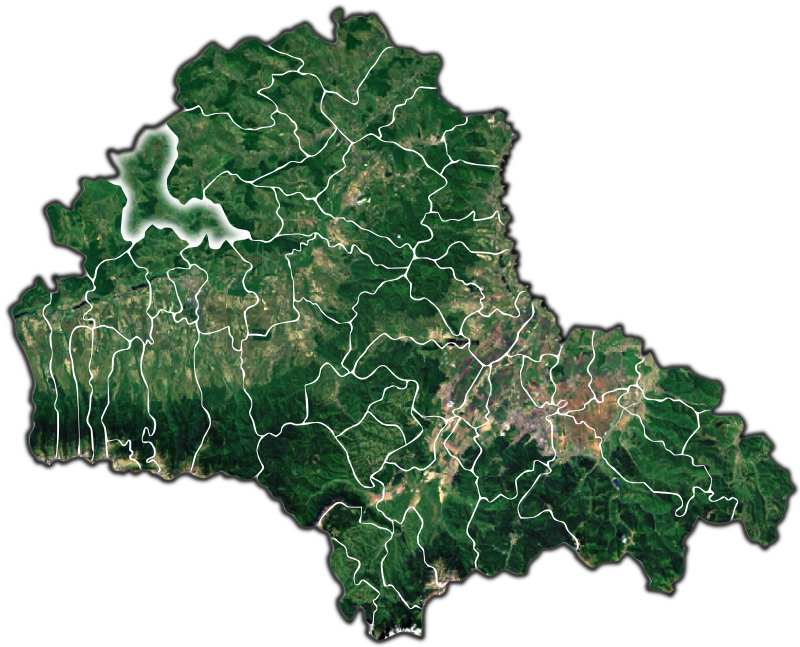
- Location in Brașov County

- Location in Romania
- Coordinates: 45°56′N 24°55′E
- Country: Romania
- County: Brașov
- Subdivisions: Bărcuț, Felmer, Rodbav, Seliștat, Șoarș

Government
  - Mayor (2020–2024): Dănuț Ioan Timiș (PNL)
- Area: 166.90 km^{2} (64.44 sq mi)
- Elevation: 489 m (1,604 ft)
- Population (2021-12-01): 1,738
  - Density: 10.41/km^{2} (26.97/sq mi)
- Time zone: EET/EEST (UTC+2/+3)
- Postal code: 507215
- Area code: (+40) 02 68
- Vehicle reg.: BV
- Website: www.primariasoars.ro

Șoarș (German: Scharosch bei Fogarasch; Transylvanian Saxon dialect: Schursch; Hungarian: Sáros) is a commune in Brașov County, Transylvania, Romania. It is composed of five villages: Bărcuț (Bekokten; Báránykút), Felmer (Felmern; Felmér), Rodbav (Rohrbach; Nádpatak), Seliștat (Seligstadt; Boldogváros), and Șoarș. Each village has a fortified church.

== Geography ==
The commune lies within the southern reaches of the Transylvanian Plateau. The river Hârtibaciu flows through the village of Bărcuț; its left tributary, Valea Morii, flows through the village of Seliștat.

Șoarș is located in the northwestern part of the county, 14 km (8.7 mi) north of Făgăraș, on the border with Sibiu County. The county seat, Brașov, is some 80 km (50 mi) to the southeast.

== History ==
In October 1916, Șoarș was the site of the Battle of Báránykút, where a German offensive was successfully repulsed by the Romanian Second Army during the Battle of Transylvania in World War I.

== Economy ==
The Rodbav gas field is situated on the territory of the commune. It was discovered in 1935 and began production in 1938.

== Demographics ==
Historical population
Year	Pop.	±%
1850	4,905	—
1880	4,174	−14.9%
1910	4,712	+12.9%
1941	5,123	+8.7%
1966	3,837	−25.1%
1977	3,144	−18.1%
1992	1,950	−38.0%
2002	1,913	−1.9%
2011	1,755	−8.3%
2021	1,738	−1.0%
Source: Census data

At the 2021 census, the commune had a population of 1,738; of those, 85.56% were Romanians, 1.78% Roma, 1.5% Germans, and 1.04% Hungarians.

== Natives ==
- Ion Mușlea (1899–1966), folklorist.
