= Hârtibaciu =

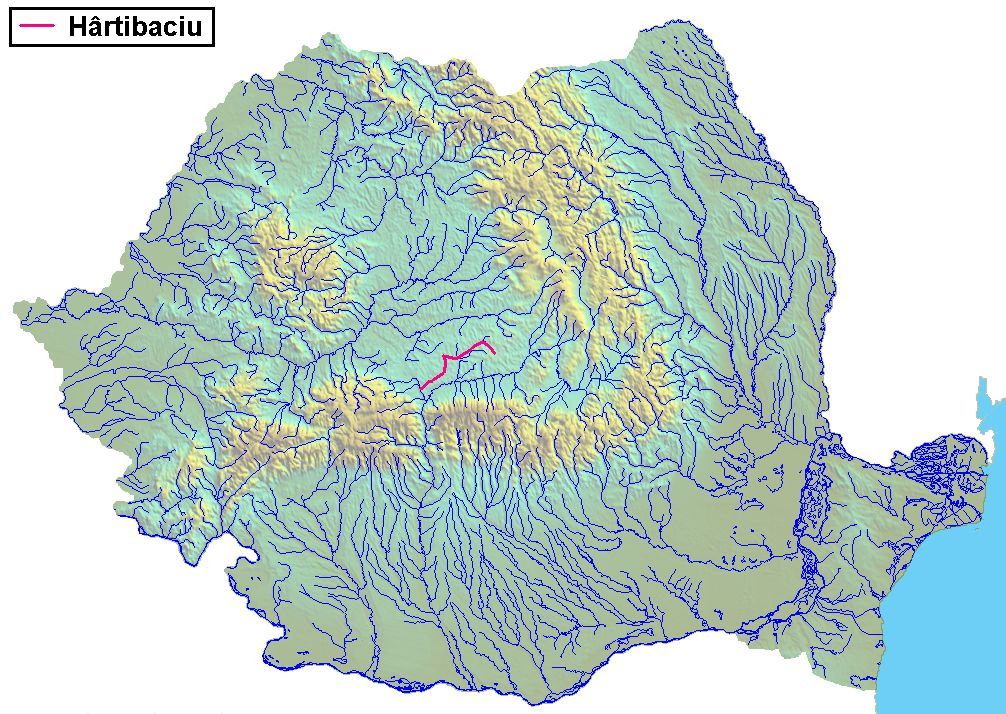

- Location within Romania

Location
- Country: Romania
- Counties: Brașov, Sibiu
- Towns: Agnita

Physical characteristics
- Mouth: Cibin
  - location: Mohu
  - coordinates: 45.7338°N 24.2379°E
- Length: 110 km (68 mi)
- Basin size: 1,025 km^{2} (396 sq mi)

Basin features
- Progression: Cibin→ Olt→ Danube→ Black Sea

The Hârtibaciu (German: Harbach; Hungarian: Hortobágy) is a river in the Transylvania historical region of Romania. It develops in the South Carpathians and flows into the Cibin, a tributary of the Olt, in Mohu, southeast of Sibiu. It flows through the towns and villages Bărcuț, Retiș, Brădeni, Netuș, Agnita, Benești, Alțâna, Nocrich, Hosman, Cornățel and Cașolț. Its length is 110 km (68 mi) and its basin size is 1,025 km^{2} (396 sq mi).

King Géza II of Hungary settled the initial Transylvanian Saxon colonists along the Hârtibaciu, referred to by them as the Harbach. The Saxons established many towns along the river such as Agnita with Kirchenburgen, or fortified churches.

== Tributaries ==
The following rivers are tributaries to the river Hârtibaciu (from source to mouth):

- Left: Valea Morii, Albac, Androchiel, Marpod, Fofeldea, Ghijasa
- Right: Sărătura, Halmer, Valea Comunală, Valea Satului, Valea Înfundăturii, Valea Stricată, Coveș, Bârghiș, Zlagna, Hârța, Vurpăr, Țichindeal, Lacul Roșia, Zăvoi, Daia, Cașolț
