= Zăvoi (river) =

- Location within Romania

Location
- Country: Romania
- Counties: Sibiu County
- Villages: Roșia

Physical characteristics
- Mouth: Hârtibaciu
  - location: Cornățel
  - coordinates: 45.8030°N 24.3555°E
- Length: 18 km (11 mi)
- Basin size: 105 km^{2} (41 sq mi)

Basin features
- Progression: Hârtibaciu→ Cibin→ Olt→ Danube→ Black Sea
- Tributaries
  - right: Valea Caprelor, Valea Lungă

The Zăvoi is a right tributary of the river Hârtibaciu in Romania. It discharges into the Hârtibaciu in Cornățel. Its length is 18 km (11 mi) and its basin size is 105 km^{2} (41 sq mi).
