= Peleș (river) =

River in Romania

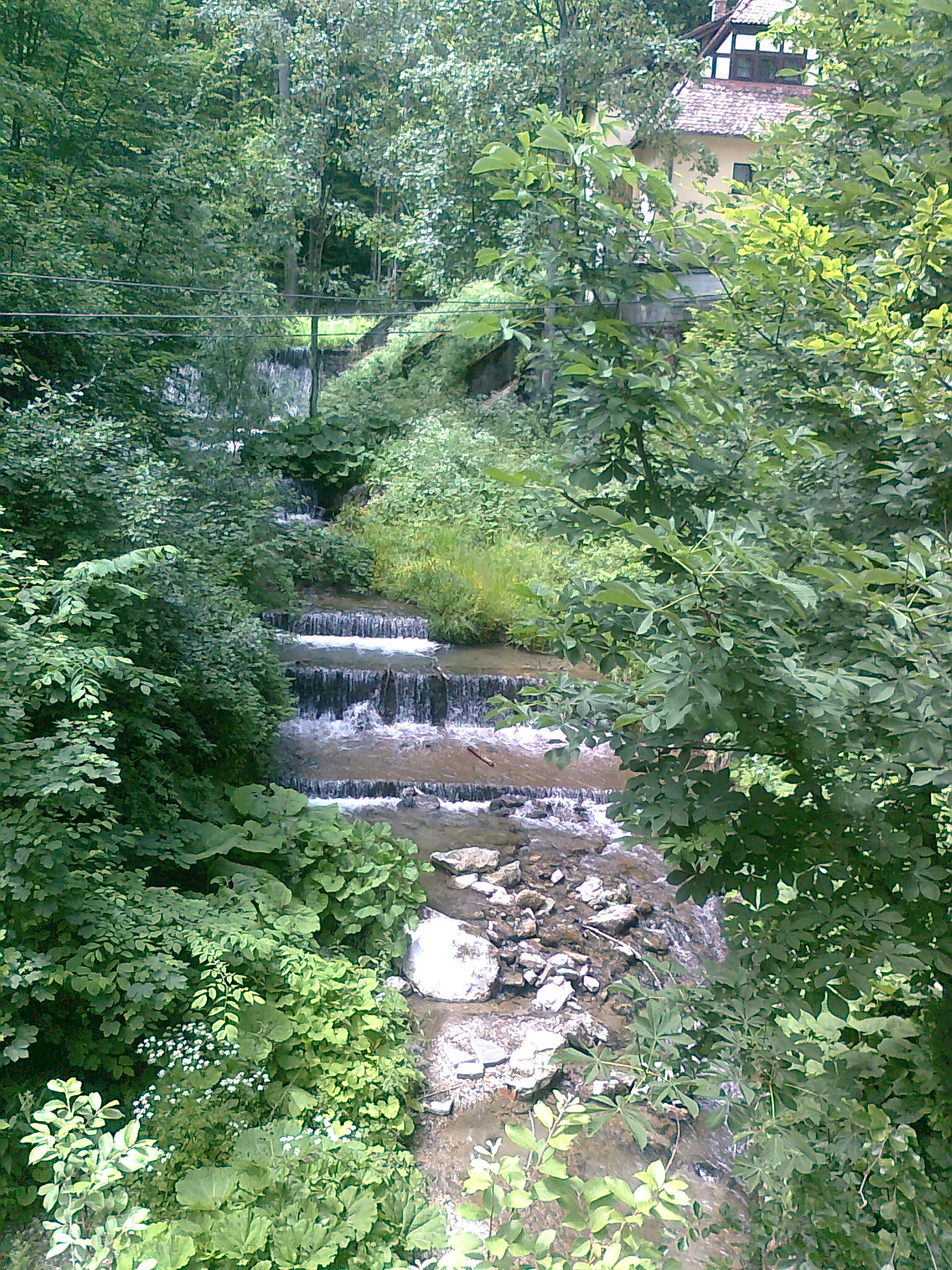
- The Peleș near Peleș Castle

- Location within Romania

Location
- Country: Romania
- Counties: Prahova County
- Towns: Sinaia

Physical characteristics
- Source: Mount Piatra Arsă
  - location: Bucegi Mountains
  - coordinates: 45°22′25″N 25°29′40″E
- Mouth: Prahova
  - location: Sinaia
  - coordinates: 45°21′21″N 25°33′22″E
  - elevation: 810 m (2,660 ft)
- Length: 6 km (3.7 mi)
- Basin size: 6 km^{2} (2.3 sq mi)

Basin features
- Progression: Prahova→ Ialomița→ Danube→ Black Sea
- Tributaries
  - right: Valea cu Genune, Valea Zadelor, Peleșel, Sfânta Ana
- River code: XI.1.20.5

The Peleș is a small right tributary of the river Prahova in Romania. It flows into the Prahova in Sinaia. Its length is 6 km (3.7 mi) and its basin size is 6 km^{2} (2.3 sq mi).
