= Zlagna (Hârtibaciu) =

- Location within Romania

Location
- Country: Romania
- Counties: Sibiu County
- Villages: Zlagna, Ighișu Vechi

Physical characteristics
- Mouth: Hârtibaciu
  - coordinates: 45.9627°N 24.4742°E
- Length: 11 km (6.8 mi)
- Basin size: 47 km^{2} (18 sq mi)

Basin features
- Progression: Hârtibaciu→ Cibin→ Olt→ Danube→ Black Sea
- Tributaries
  - right: Dosu Pădurii

The Zlagna is a right tributary of the river Hârtibaciu in Romania. It discharges into the Hârtibaciu near Alțâna. Its length is 11 km (6.8 mi) and its basin size is 47 km^{2} (18 sq mi).
