= Bârghiș =

- Commune
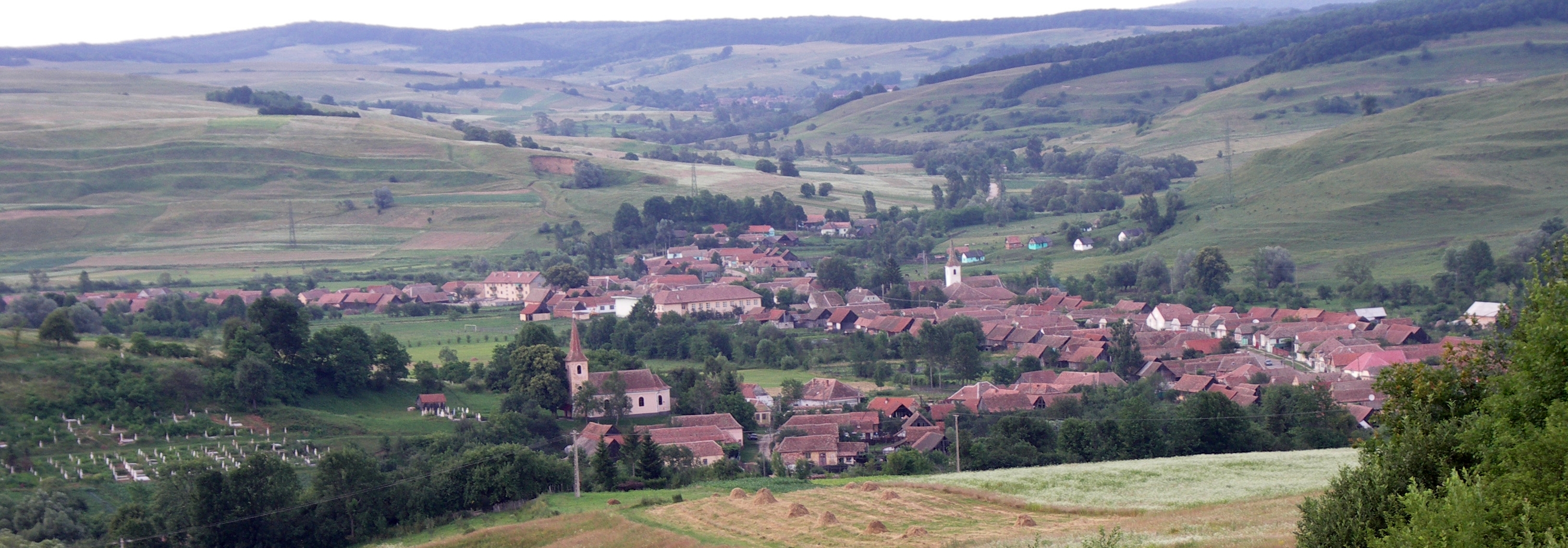

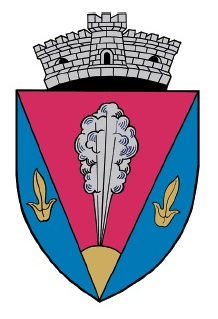
- Coat of arms

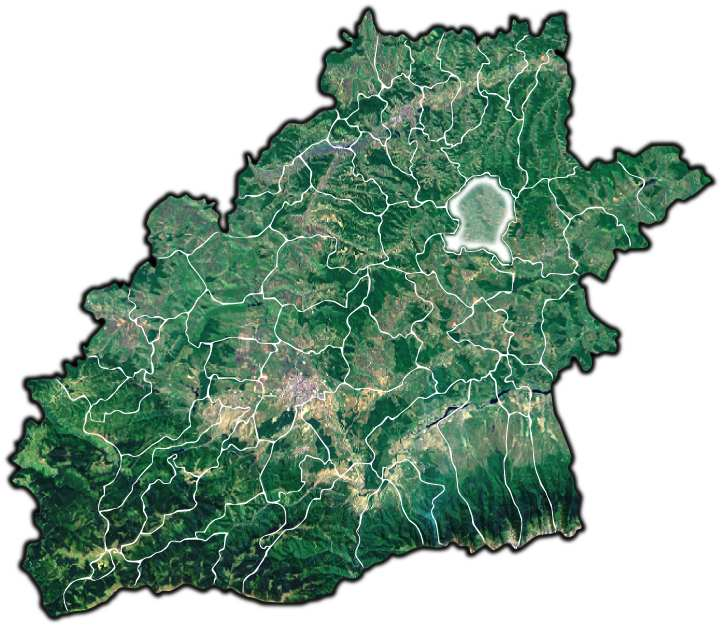
- Location in Sibiu County

- Location in Romania
- Coordinates: 45°58′48″N 24°31′48″E
- Country: Romania
- County: Sibiu

Government
  - Mayor (2020–2024): Ștefan Șulumberchean (PNL)
- Area: 99.9 km^{2} (38.6 sq mi)
- Elevation: 446 m (1,463 ft)
- Population (2021-12-01): 1,894
  - Density: 19.0/km^{2} (49.1/sq mi)
- Time zone: UTC+02:00 (EET)
  - Summer (DST): UTC+03:00 (EEST)
- Postal code: 557035
- Area code: +40 x59
- Vehicle reg.: SB
- Website: www.comunabirghis.ro

Bârghiș (German: Bürgisch; Hungarian: Bürkös) is a commune in the northern part of Sibiu County. It is situated in central Romania, in the historical region of Transylvania. The commune is composed of six villages: Apoș, Bârghiș, Ighișu Vechi, Pelișor, Vecerd, and Zlagna. Pelișor and Zlagna have fortified churches.

The commune is located on the Transylvanian Plateau, in the northeastern part of Sibiu County, about 50 km (31 mi) from the county seat, Sibiu. It lies on the banks of the rivers Bârghiș and Zlagna, both affluents of the Hârtibaciu.

At the 2011 census, 86.4% of inhabitants were Romanians, 5.9% Roma, 5.2% Hungarians, and 0.7% Germans.

In Romanian	In German	In Hungarian
Apoș	Abtsdorf bei Agnetheln	Szászapátfalva
Bârghiș	Bürgisch	Bürkös
Ighișu Vechi	Rumänisch Eibesdorf	Oláhivánfalva
Pelișor	Magarei	Magaré
Vecerd	Wetscherd	Vecsérd
Zlagna	Schlatt	Szászzalatna

== Natives ==
- Liviu Constantinescu (1914 – 1997), geophysicist and academic

== See also ==
- Villages with fortified churches in Transylvania
