= Agnita =

- Town
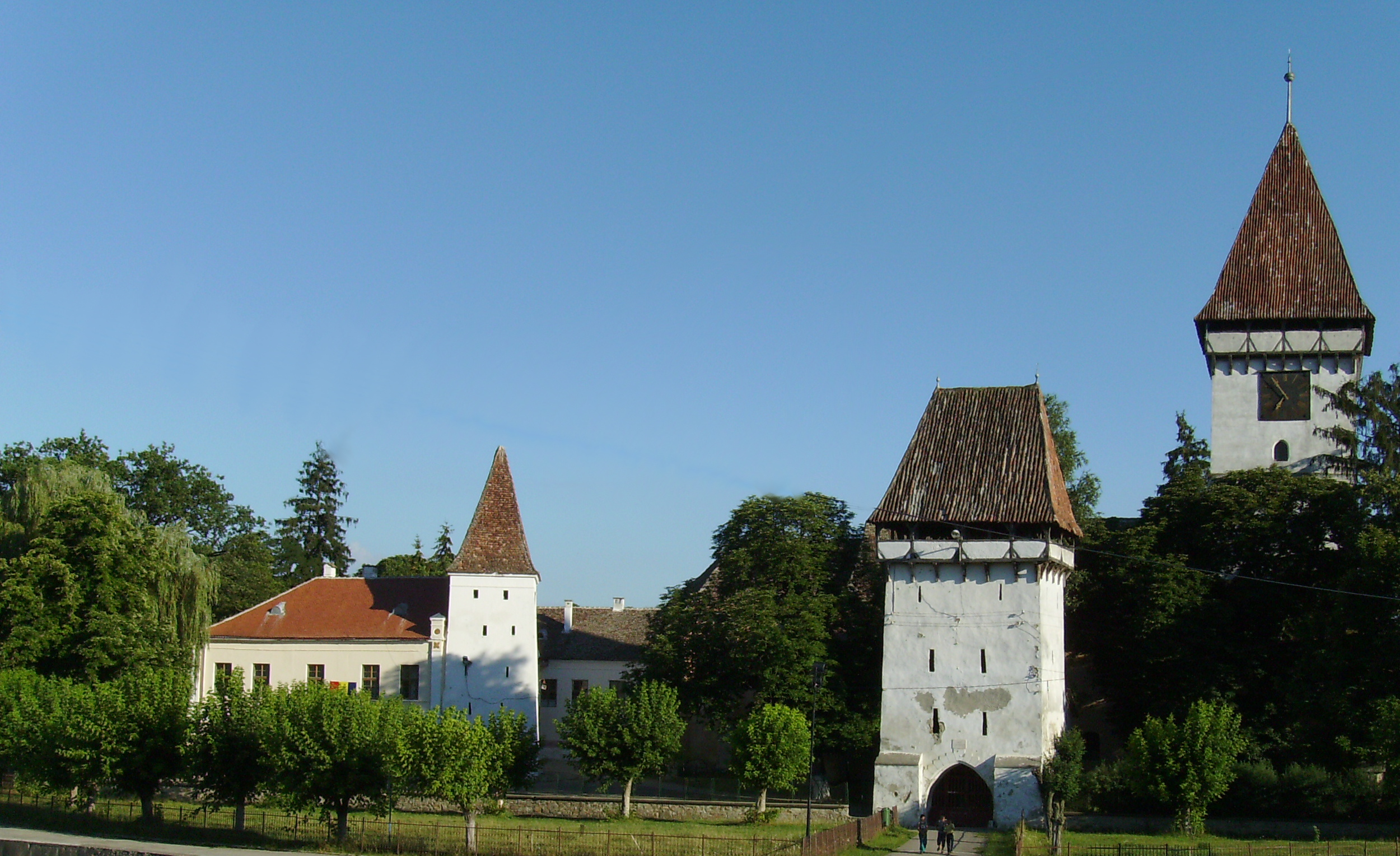
- Transylvanian Saxon Fortified Church in Agnita

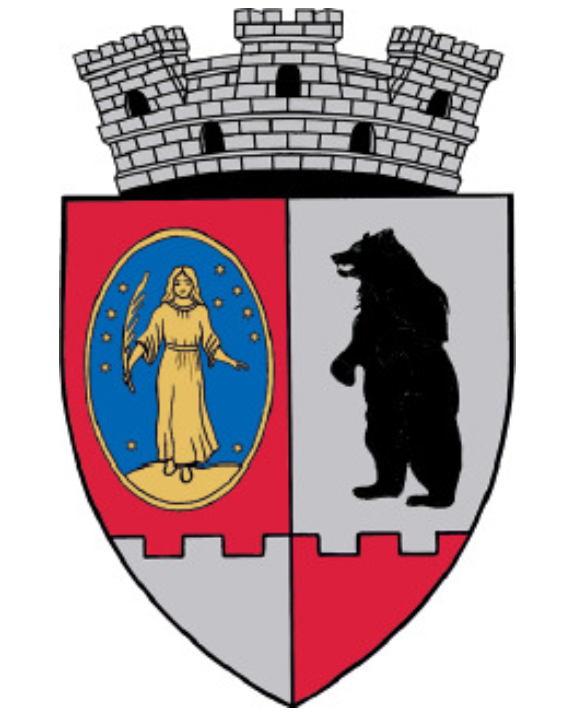
- Coat of arms

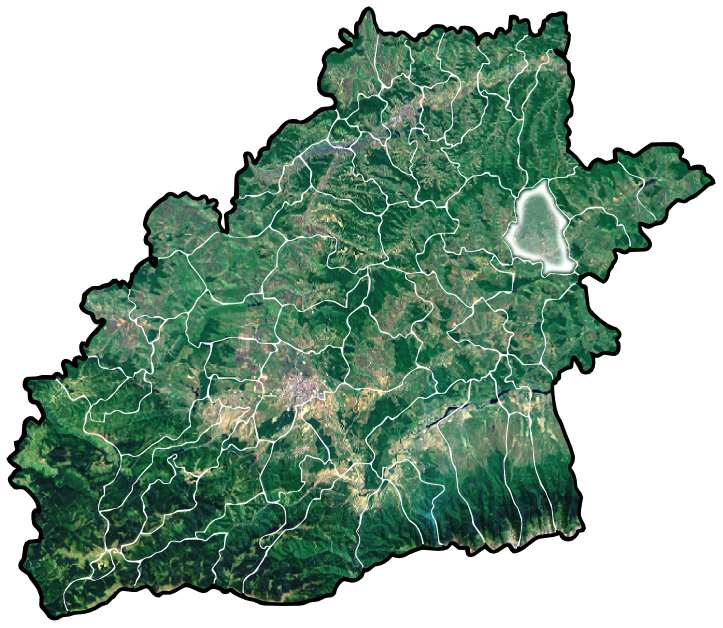
- Location in Sibiu County

- Location in Romania
- Coordinates: 45°58′23″N 24°37′2″E
- Country: Romania
- County: Sibiu

Government
  - Mayor (2024–2028): Alin-Ciprian Schiau-Gull (PNL)
- Area: 96.2 km^{2} (37.1 sq mi)
- Elevation: 447 m (1,467 ft)
- Population (2021-12-01): 7,564
  - Density: 78.6/km^{2} (204/sq mi)
- Time zone: UTC+02:00 (EET)
  - Summer (DST): UTC+03:00 (EEST)
- Postal code: 555100
- Area code: +(40) 0269
- Vehicle reg.: SB
- Website: primaria-agnita.ro

Agnita (Romanian pronunciation: [aɡˈnita]; German: Agnetheln; Transylvanian Saxon: Ongenîtlen; Hungarian: Szentágota) is a town on the Hârtibaciu river in Sibiu County, Transylvania, central Romania. It is considered the locality in the center of the country. The town administers two villages, namely Coveș (German: Käbisch; Hungarian: Ágotakövesd) and Ruja (German: Roseln; Hungarian: Rozsonda).

== Demographics ==
Historical population
Year	Pop.	±%
1956	9,108	—
1966	10,865	+19.3%
1977	12,853	+18.3%
1992	12,325	−4.1%
2002	12,115	−1.7%
2011	8,300	−31.5%
2021	7,564	−8.9%
Source: Census data

The population was 8,300 at the 2011 census, of which 94.2% were Romanians, 2.9% Hungarians, 1.5% Roma, and 1% Germans (more specifically Transylvanian Saxons). At the 2021 census, Agnita had a population of 7,564; of those, 81.03% were Romanians and 1.82% Hungarians.

== History ==
The first document mentioning it is a land sale contract signed in 1280 by one Henric from Sancta Agatha. In 1376, Louis I of Hungary granted to the village the right to hold a market. In 1466, Matthias Corvinus granted to the village the right to carry trials (jus gladi) and built a fortress to defend the Kingdom of Hungary from the Ottoman Empire.

Agnita, mentioned for the first time in a document from 1280, is a town with traditional crafts, famous for the old guilds of tanners, shoemakers, tailors, coopers and potters, with semi-rural economy.

Here is one of the oldest peasant fortification in Transylvania. Initiated in the thirteenth century, it was amplified successively came to be in the seventeenth century, three fortified enclosure with towers. The city center is a church-hall with three ships (naves with stands) and turn west (XV around the year 1409). In turn strengthened the church has undergone many transformations. The four towers of the fortified church - the shoemakers, tailors, blacksmiths and coopers - demonstrates the economic strength of these guilds, and were assigned to the defense that those portions of the wall in case of armed conflict. City Museum has a substantial collection of medieval art (Gothic chests, architecture, sculpture, ceramics, etc.).

King of Hungary, Louis of Anjou, conferred Agnita (or villa Zenthagata) since 1376, the right to hold an annual fair on 24 June (day of St. John). Subsequently, this right was extended to two other fairs. In 1466, a Hungarian king granted the town Agnita right "ius Gladiator", i.e., the right to decide and execute the death sentence. In the same year, the village was allowed to keep half of the contingent settlement of royal troops to defend their own city to the church from falling into foreign hands, since it was near the frontier into Wallachia. Until 1950, when the city was declared, there was a common Agnita fair (Marktgemeinde).

The railway was built in 1898 from Sighișoara to the terminus at Agnita railway station and further extended to Sibiu in 1910 with a station at Coveș. However, by 1965 the route was curtailed at Agnita with the closure of the line north including the section through the town. As a result, a new station was built in the west; however, in 2001 this too was closed. The line is a historic monument and there is an active movement to restore the entire line.

== Administration and local politics ==
=== Town council ===
The town's current local council has the following political composition, according to the results of the 2020 Romanian local elections:

Party	Seats	Current Council
National Liberal Party (PNL)	9	
Save Romania Union (USR)	4	
Social Democratic Party (PSD)	2	
PRO Romania (PRO)	2	
Greater Romania Party (PRM)	1	

== Attractions ==
- The Transylvanian Saxon Fortified Church

The fortified church of Agnita, built in the 13th century, features a blend of Romanesque and Gothic architectural elements. It has undergone significant renovations over the centuries, including the addition of defensive structures. The church is notable for its baroque altar from 1650 and an organ constructed by Karl Schneider.

- Museum of History - Valea Hârtibaciului

The Museum of History in Agnita, located at 1 Decembrie Street, showcases the ethnographic heritage of the Hârtibaciului Valley. The museum highlights the daily lives of Romanians, Saxons, and Hungarians in the area. Its diverse collection includes over 5000 items, covering ethnography, archaeology, history, and decorative arts, with a unique exhibit dedicated to the traditional event, Fuga Lolelor.

== Gallery ==
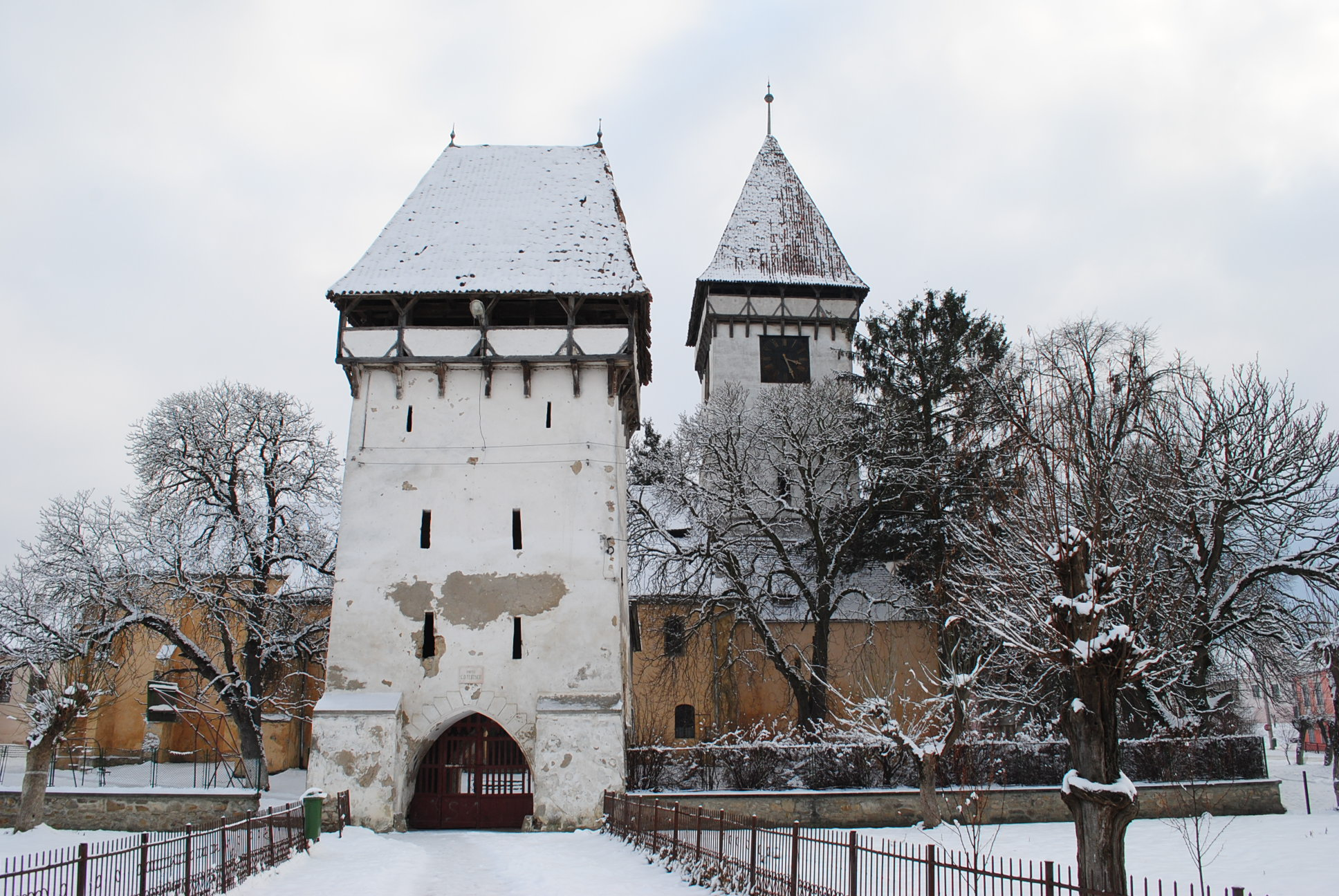
The Transylvanian Saxon fortified church of Agnita

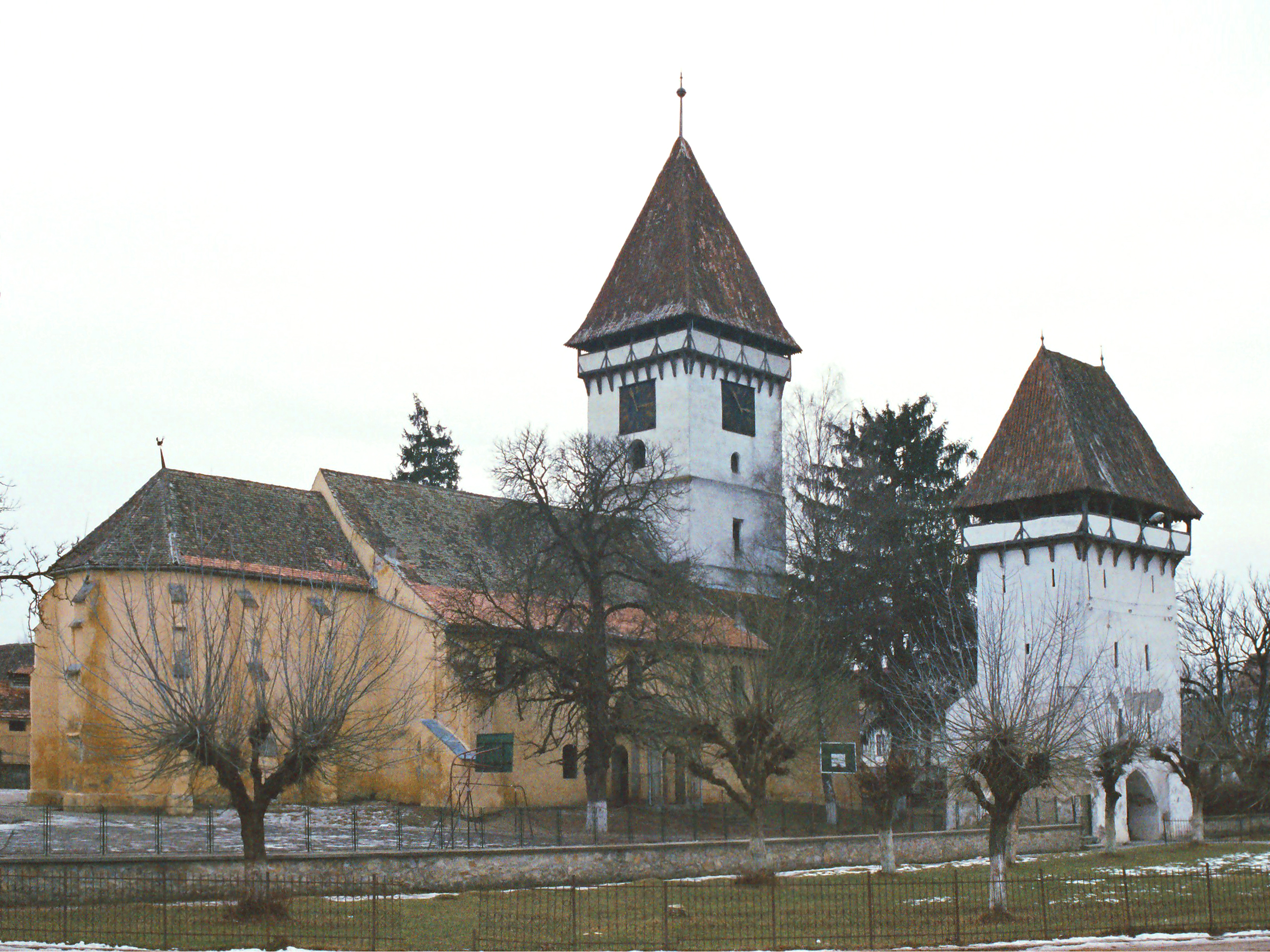
The Transylvanian Saxon fortified church of Agnita

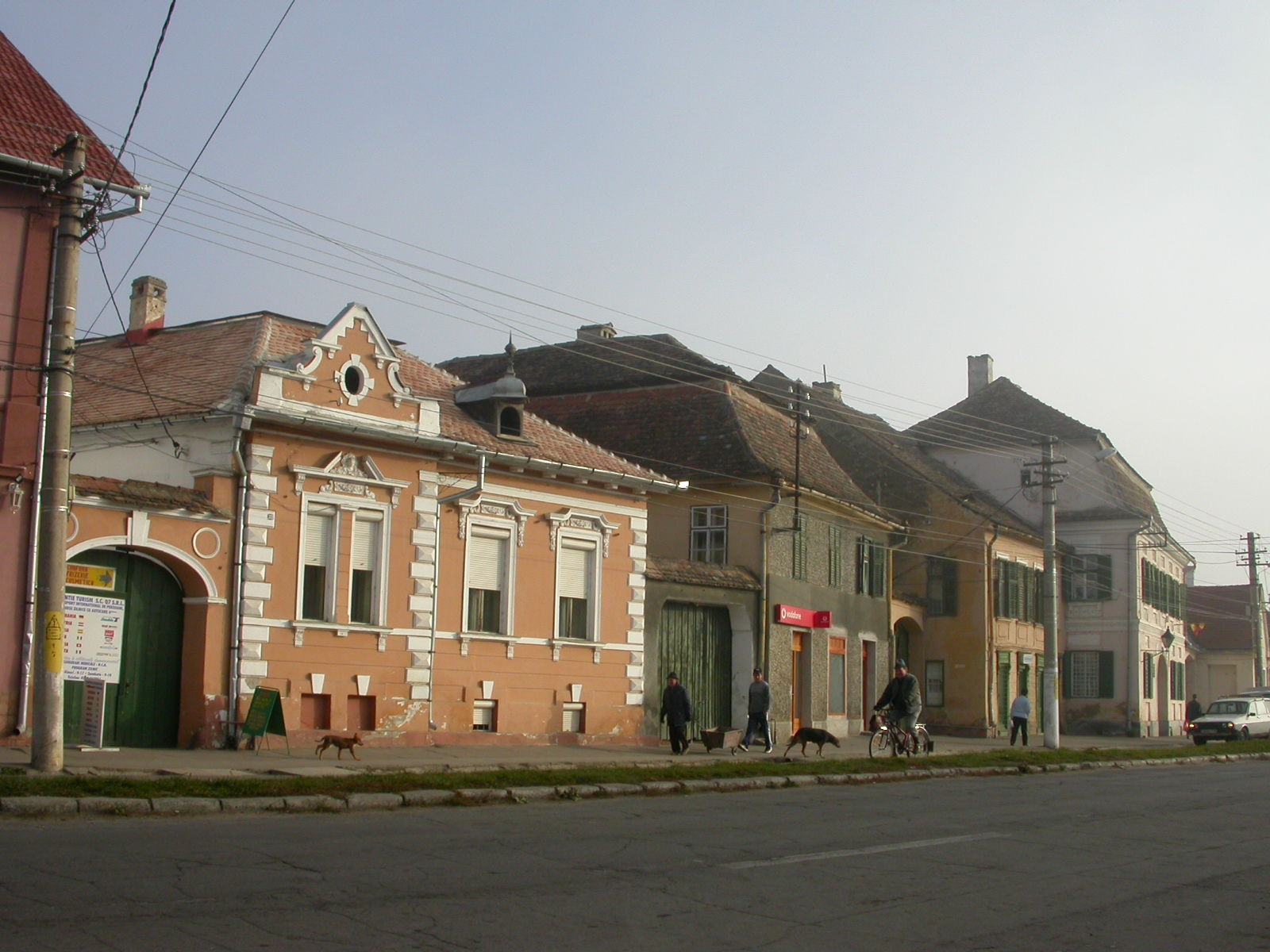
Historical centre of Agnita

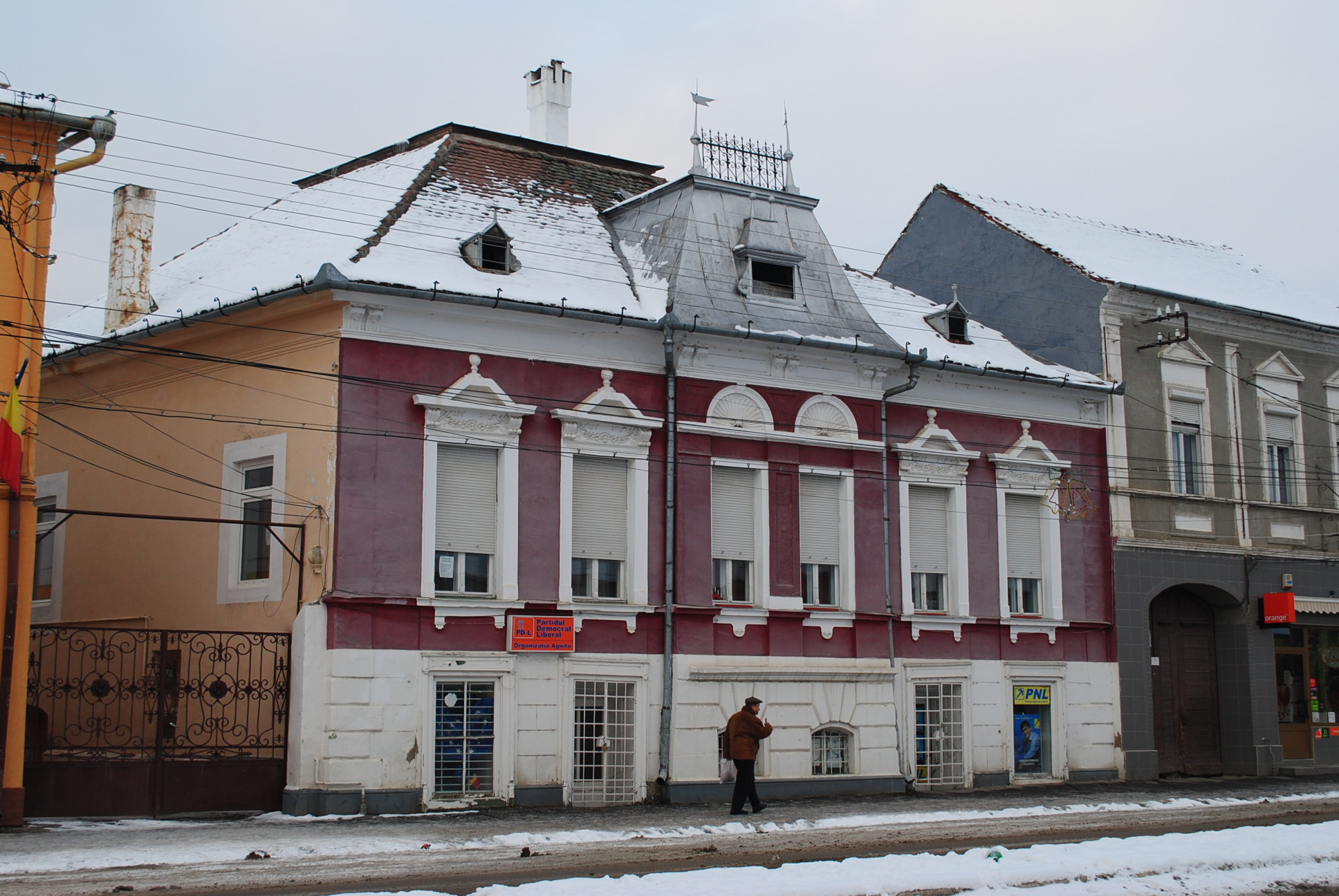
Historical centre of Agnita

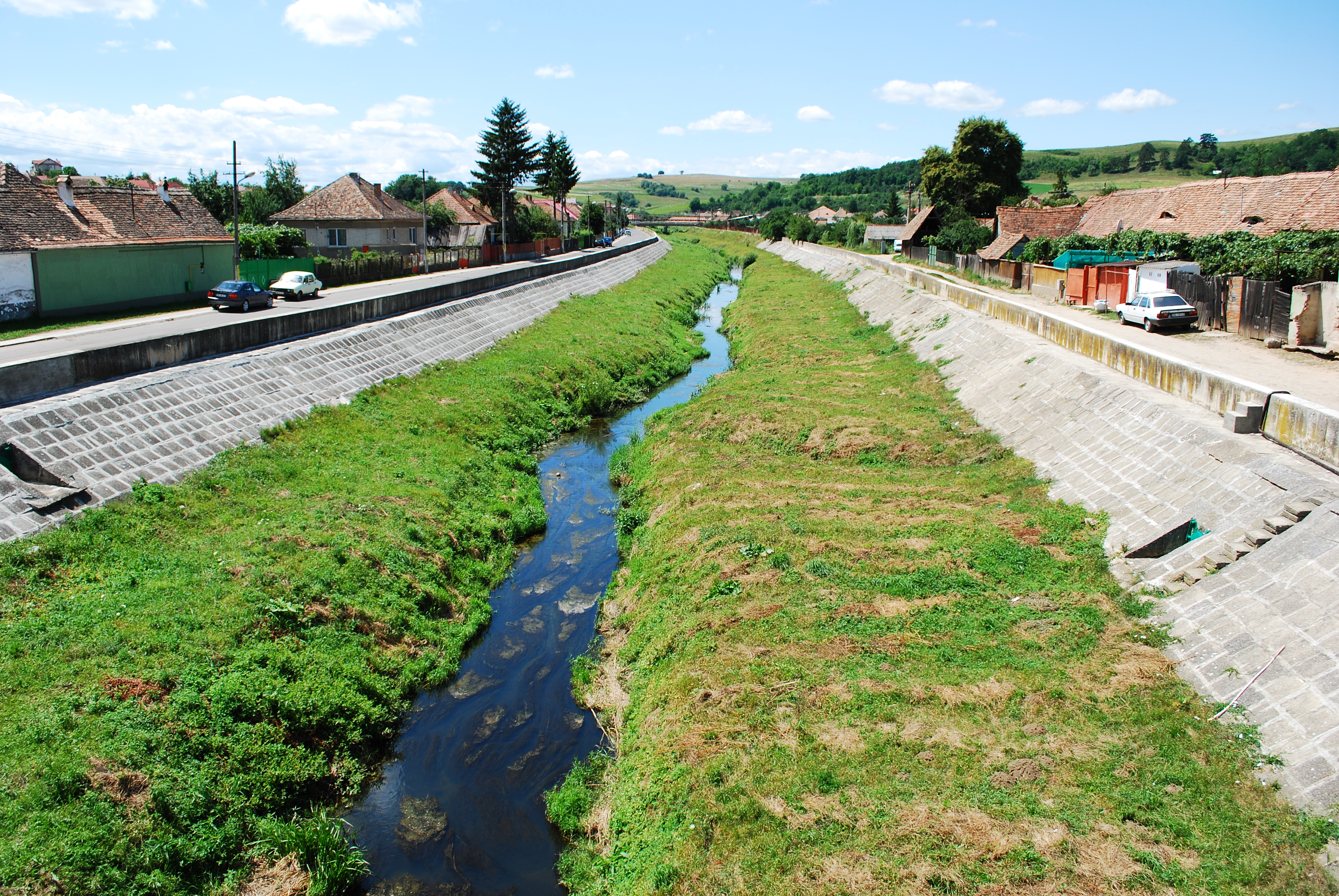
Hârtibaciu river in Agnita

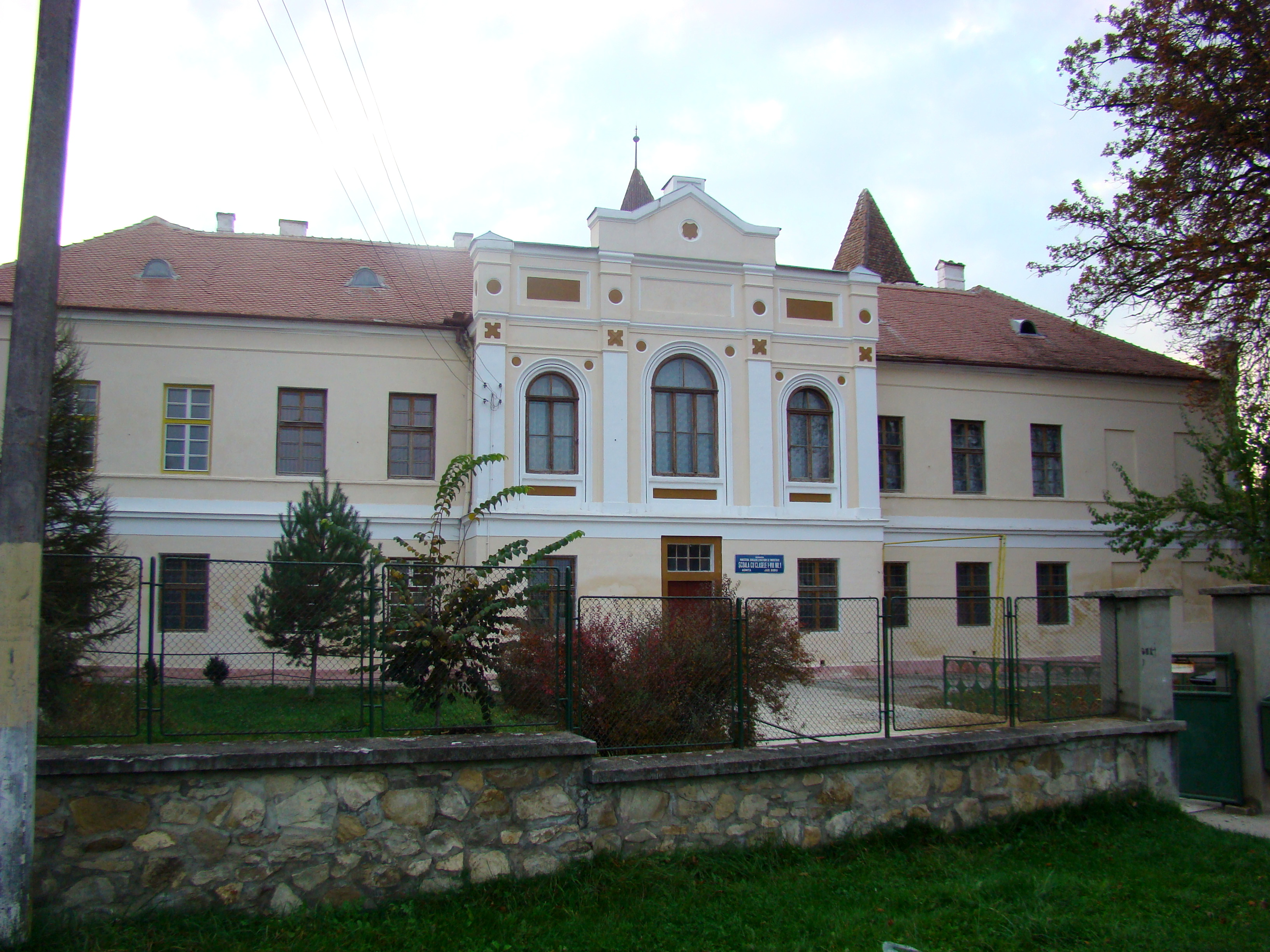
General school nr.1

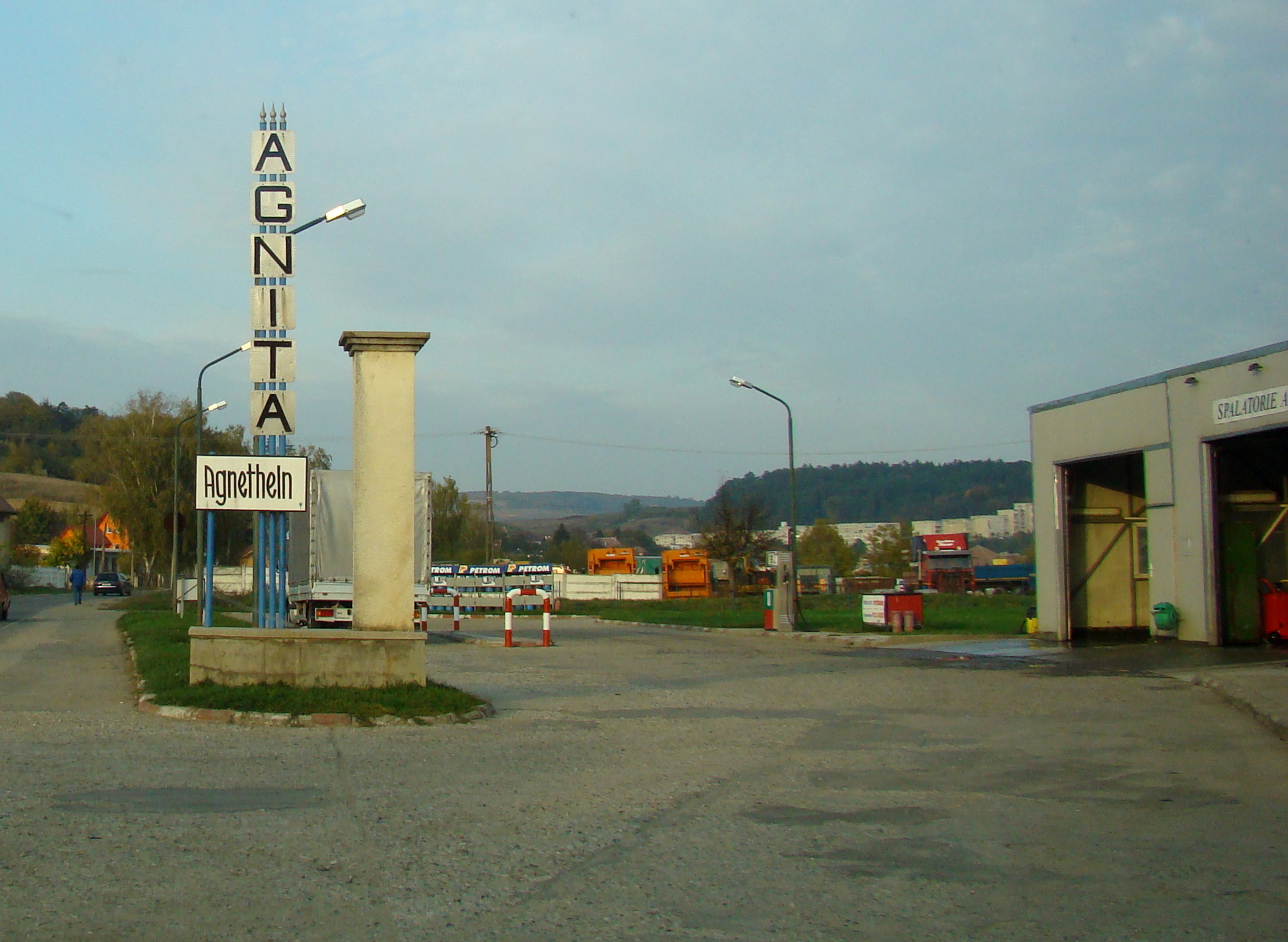
Entry into Agnita

== Natives ==
- Bernd Fabritius (born 1965), German lawyer and politician
- Ioan Gyuri Pascu (1961–2016), teacher, radio presenter, comedian, actor, musician multi-instrumentalist, and producer
- Laura Poantă (born 1971), physician, medical scientist, author, translator, and painter
- Otto Tellman (1927–2013), handball player and coach
