= Turcu =

Turcu Moieciu
- Location within Romania

Location
- Country: Romania
- Counties: Brașov County
- Villages: Moieciu de Sus, Moieciu de Jos, Bran, Tohanu Nou

Physical characteristics
- Source: Bucegi Mountains
- Mouth: Bârsa
  - location: Downstream of Zărnești
  - coordinates: 45.5781°N 25.3916°E
- Length: 30 km (19 mi)
- Basin size: 201 km^{2} (78 sq mi)

Basin features
- Progression: Bârsa→ Olt→ Danube→ Black Sea

The Turcu (also: Moieciu, in its upper course also: Bângăleasa or Grohotișul) is a right tributary of the river Bârsa in Romania. It discharges into the Bârsa in Tohanu Vechi near Zărnești. Its source is in the Bucegi Mountains. Its length is 30 km (19 mi) and its basin size is 201 km^{2} (78 sq mi).

== Tributaries ==
The following rivers are tributaries to the river Turcu (from source to mouth):

- Left: Stăncioiu, Grădiștea, Sbârcioara, Tohănița
- Right: Valea Lungă, Jungulești, Șimon, Poarta
