= Măgura =

Măgura may refer to the following places:

- Măgura, Bacău, a commune in Bacău County, Romania
- Măgura, Buzău, a commune in Buzău County, Romania
- Măgura, Teleorman, a commune in Teleorman County, Romania
- Măgura, a village in Bucium Commune, Alba County, Romania
- Măgura, a village in Galda de Jos Commune, Alba County, Romania
- Măgura, a village in Pietroasa Commune, Bihor County, Romania
- Măgura, a village in Moieciu Commune, Brașov County, Romania
- Măgura, a village in Zăvoi Commune, Caraș-Severin County, Romania
- Măgura, a village in Cerchezu Commune, Constanța County, Romania
- Măgura, a village in Bezdead Commune, Dâmbovița County, Romania
- Măgura, a village in Hulubești Commune, Dâmbovița County, Romania
- Măgura, a village in Mărtinești Commune, Hunedoara County, Romania
- Măgura, a village in Perieţi Commune, Olt County, Romania
- Măgura, a village in Tătulești Commune, Olt County, Romania
- Măgura, a village in Șoimari Commune, Prahova County, Romania
- Măgura, a village in Poiana Blenchii Commune, Sălaj County, Romania
- Măgura, a village in Ulma Commune, Suceava County, Romania
- Măgura, a village in Mihăeşti Commune, Vâlcea County, Romania
- Măgura, a village in Jitia Commune, Vrancea County, Romania
- Măgura, a village in Pietrosu Commune, Fălești District, Moldova

Additionally, four places in Romania are known in Hungarian as Magura:

- Măgura Ilvei Commune, Bistrița-Năsăud County
- Măgura, a village in Moieciu Commune, Brașov County
- Măgura, a village in Mărtinești Commune, Hunedoara County
- Măgura-Topliţa, a village in Certeju de Sus Commune, Hunedoara County

Rivers in Romania:

- Măgura, a tributary of the Neagra in Alba County
- Măgura (Bahlui), a tributary of the Bahlui in Iași County
- Măgura, a tributary of the Cerchez river in Constanța County
- Măgura, a tributary of the Cormaia in Bistrița-Năsăud County
- Măgura, a tributary of the Gilort in Gorj County
- Măgura, a tributary of the Sbârcioara in Brașov County

== See also ==
- Magura (disambiguation)
