= Poarta =

Poarta may refer to several places in Romania:

- Poarta, a village in Bran Commune, Brașov County
- Poarta, a village in Fărăgău Commune, Mureș County
- Poarta, a tributary of the Priboiasa in Vâlcea County
- Poarta (Turcu), a river in Brașov County
