= Marcus =

Marcus, Markus, Márkus or Mărcuș may refer to:

- Marcus (name), a masculine given name
- Marcus (praenomen), a Roman personal name

== Places ==
- Marcus, a main belt asteroid, also known as (369088) Marcus 2008 GG44
- Mărcuş, a village in Dobârlău Commune, Covasna County, Romania
- Marcus, Illinois, an unincorporated community, United States
- Marcus, Iowa, a city, United States
- Marcus, South Dakota, an unincorporated community, United States
- Marcus, Washington, a town, United States
- Marcus Island, Japan, also known as Minami-Tori-shima
- Mărcuș River, Romania
- Marcus Township, Cherokee County, Iowa, United States

== Other uses ==
- Markus, a beetle genus in family Cantharidae
- Marcus (album), 2008 album by Marcus Miller
- Marcus (comedian), finalist on Last Comic Standing season 6
- Marcus Amphitheater, Milwaukee, Wisconsin
- Marcus Center, Milwaukee, Wisconsin
- Marcus & Co., American jewelry retailer
- Marcus by Goldman Sachs, an online bank
- USS Marcus, a US Navy destroyer (1919–1935)

== See also ==
- Marcos (disambiguation)
- Marques (disambiguation)
- Neiman Marcus, American retail department store
