= Vlădoiu =

Vlădoiu may refer to:

- Ion Vlădoiu (born 1968), Romanian footballer and manager
- Ștefan Vlădoiu (born 1998), Romanian footballer
- Valea Vlădoiu River, river in Romania
