= Dacian fortress of Teliu =

Ancient fortified town

- Location within Romania
- 45.70°N 25.85°E
- Location: Dealul Cetăţii, Cetate, Cetăţea, Teliu, Brașov, Romania

Site notes
- Condition: Ruined

Monument istoric
- Reference no.: BV-I-s-A-11291

Dacian fortress of Teliu was a Dacian fortified town.
