= Șimon =

- Location within Romania

Location
- Country: Romania
- Counties: Brașov County
- Villages: Șimon, Bran

Physical characteristics
- Source: Bucegi Mountains
- Mouth: Turcu
  - location: Bran
  - coordinates: 45.5106°N 25.3550°E
- Length: 15 km (9.3 mi)
- Basin size: 38 km^{2} (15 sq mi)

Basin features
- Progression: Turcu→ Bârsa→ Olt→ Danube→ Black Sea
- Tributaries
  - left: Valea lui Lambă
- River code: VIII.1.50.4.3

The Șimon (in its upper course also: Gaura) is a right tributary of the river Turcu in Romania. Its source is in the Bucegi Mountains. It flows into the Turcu in Bran. Its length is 15 km (9.3 mi) and its basin size is 38 km^{2} (15 sq mi).
