= Magura =

Magura may refer to:

- Magura GmbH, a German cycling company
- Magura, a mountain in Magura National Park, Poland
- Magura, a mountain in the Silesian Beskids in Poland
- Magura (Western Tatras), a mountain in the Western Tatras in Poland
- Magura Cave in Bulgaria
- Magura, the Hungarian name for the town Măgura Ilvei in Bistrița-Năsăud County, Transylvania, Romania
- Magura, Bangladesh, a city in Bangladesh
- Magura District, a district of Khulna Division, Bangladesh
  - Magura Sadar Upazila, an upazila in this district
  - Magura-1, a constituency in Bangladesh
  - Magura-2, a constituency in Bangladesh
- Magura, Pirojpur, a village in Pirojpur District, Bangladesh
- Magura Glacier on Livingston Island, Antarctica
- MAGURA V5, Ukrainian surface unmanned boat
- The 47th Mechanized Brigade of the Ukrainian Armed Forces, also known as Magura (Ukrainian: «Маґура»).

== See also ==
- Măgura (disambiguation), places in Romania
