= Teliu (river) =

- Location within Romania

Location
- Country: Romania
- Counties: Brașov County
- Villages: Teliu

Physical characteristics
- Mouth: Tărlung
  - coordinates: 45.7194°N 25.8336°E
- Length: 14 km (8.7 mi)
- Basin size: 43 km^{2} (17 sq mi)

Basin features
- Progression: Tărlung→ Râul Negru→ Olt→ Danube→ Black Sea

The Teliu is a right tributary of the river Tărlung in Romania. The Tărlung in turn is a tributary of the river Râul Negru. The Teliu flows into the Tărlung near the village Teliu. Its length is 14 km (8.7 mi) and its basin size is 43 km^{2} (17 sq mi).
