= Zizin =

- Location within Romania

Location
- Country: Romania
- Counties: Brașov County
- Villages: Zizin, Budila

Physical characteristics
- Source: Ciucaș Mountains
- Mouth: Tărlung
  - coordinates: 45.6815°N 25.8022°E
- Length: 22 km (14 mi)
- Basin size: 68 km^{2} (26 sq mi)

Basin features
- Progression: Tărlung→ Râul Negru→ Olt→ Danube→ Black Sea
- Tributaries
  - left: Dungu
  - right: Zizinaș

The Zizin (in its upper course also: Dobromir) is a right tributary of the river Tărlung in Romania. It flows into the Tărlung in Budila. Its length is 22 km (14 mi) and its basin size 68 km^{2} (26 sq mi).
