= Sbârcioara =

- Location within Romania

Location
- Country: Romania
- Counties: Brașov County

Physical characteristics
- Mouth: Turcu
  - location: Moieciu de Jos
  - coordinates: 45.5081°N 25.3417°E
- Length: 11 km (6.8 mi)
- Basin size: 44 km^{2} (17 sq mi)

Basin features
- Progression: Turcu→ Bârsa→ Olt→ Danube→ Black Sea
- Tributaries
  - left: Corboșești, Măgura
  - right: Rogoaza
- River code: VIII.1.50.4.2

The Sbârcioara is a left tributary of the river Turcu in Romania. It flows into the Turcu in Moieciu de Jos. Its length is 11 km (6.8 mi) and its basin size is 44 km^{2} (17 sq mi).
