= Poarta (Turcu) =

- Location within Romania

Location
- Country: Romania
- Counties: Brașov County

Physical characteristics
- Source: Bucegi Mountains
- Mouth: Turcu
  - coordinates: 45.5217°N 25.3665°E
- Length: 9 km (5.6 mi)
- Basin size: 21 km^{2} (8.1 sq mi)

Basin features
- Progression: Turcu→ Bârsa→ Olt→ Danube→ Black Sea
- Tributaries
  - right: Cărbunarea

The Poarta is a right tributary of the river Turcu in Romania. Its source is in the Bucegi Mountains. It flows into the Turcu in Bran. Its length is 9 km (5.6 mi) and its basin size is 21 km^{2} (8.1 sq mi).
