= Doftana (Tărlung) =

Doftana Doftana Ardeleană
- Location within Romania

Location
- Country: Romania
- Counties: Brașov County

Physical characteristics
- Mouth: Tărlung
  - coordinates: 45.5622°N 25.7740°E
- Length: 14 km (8.7 mi)
- Basin size: 60 km^{2} (23 sq mi)

Basin features
- Progression: Tărlung→ Râul Negru→ Olt→ Danube→ Black Sea
- Tributaries
  - left: Valea Tigăilor
  - right: Valea Rece de Jos

The Doftana (sometimes: Doftana Ardeleană) is a left tributary of the river Tărlung in Romania. The Tărlung in turn is a tributary of the river Râul Negru

The Doftana flows into the Tărlung in Brădet, a village of Săcele. Its length is 14 km (8.7 mi) and its basin size is 60 km^{2} (23 sq mi).
