= Tărlung =

River in Transylvania

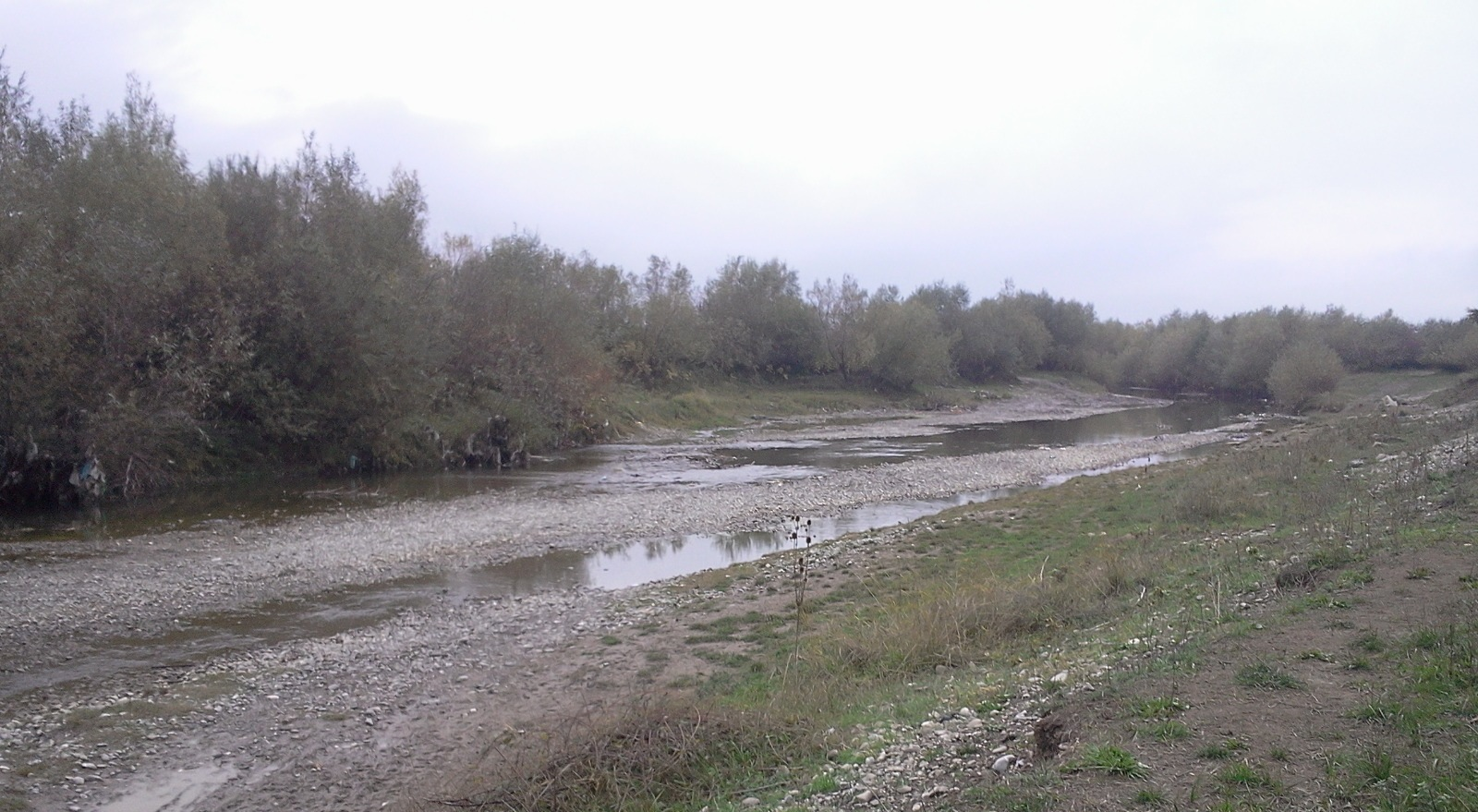

- Location within Romania

Location
- Country: Romania
- Counties: Brașov, Covasna
- Villages: Tărlungeni, Budila

Physical characteristics
- Source: Ciucaș Mountains
- Mouth: Râul Negru
  - location: Băcel
  - coordinates: 45.7611°N 25.8296°E
- Length: 57 km (35 mi)
- Basin size: 485 km^{2} (187 sq mi)

Basin features
- Progression: Râul Negru→ Olt→ Danube→ Black Sea

The Tărlung (in its upper course also: Ramura Mare; Hungarian: Tatrang) is a left tributary of the river Râul Negru in Romania. It discharges into the Râul Negru in Băcel. Its length is 57 km (35 mi) and drains a basin spanning 485 km^{2} (187 sq mi).

== Tributaries ==
The following rivers are tributaries to the river Tărlung (from source to mouth):

- Left: Urlățel, Urlatul Mic, Doftana, Gârcin
- Right: Capra Mică, Valea Cailor, Ramura Mică, Tesla, Dracu, Valea Satului, Zizin, Seaca, Valea Popii, Teliu, Dobârlău
