= Gârcin =

- Location within Romania

Location
- Country: Romania
- Counties: Brașov County

Physical characteristics
- Source: Piatra Mare Mountains
- Mouth: Tărlung
  - coordinates: 45.6067°N 25.7446°E
- Length: 13 km (8.1 mi)
- Basin size: 40 km^{2} (15 sq mi)

Basin features
- Progression: Tărlung→ Râul Negru→ Olt→ Danube→ Black Sea
- Tributaries
  - left: Gârcinul Mic, Mușatul, Valea Mărăcinilor

The Gârcin is a left tributary of the river Tărlung in Romania. The Tărlung itself is a tributary of the river Râul Negru.

The Gârcin's source is in the Piatra Mare Mountains. It flows into the Tărlung near Săcele. Its length is 13 km (8.1 mi) and its basin size is 40 km^{2} (15 sq mi).
