= Teliu =

- Commune
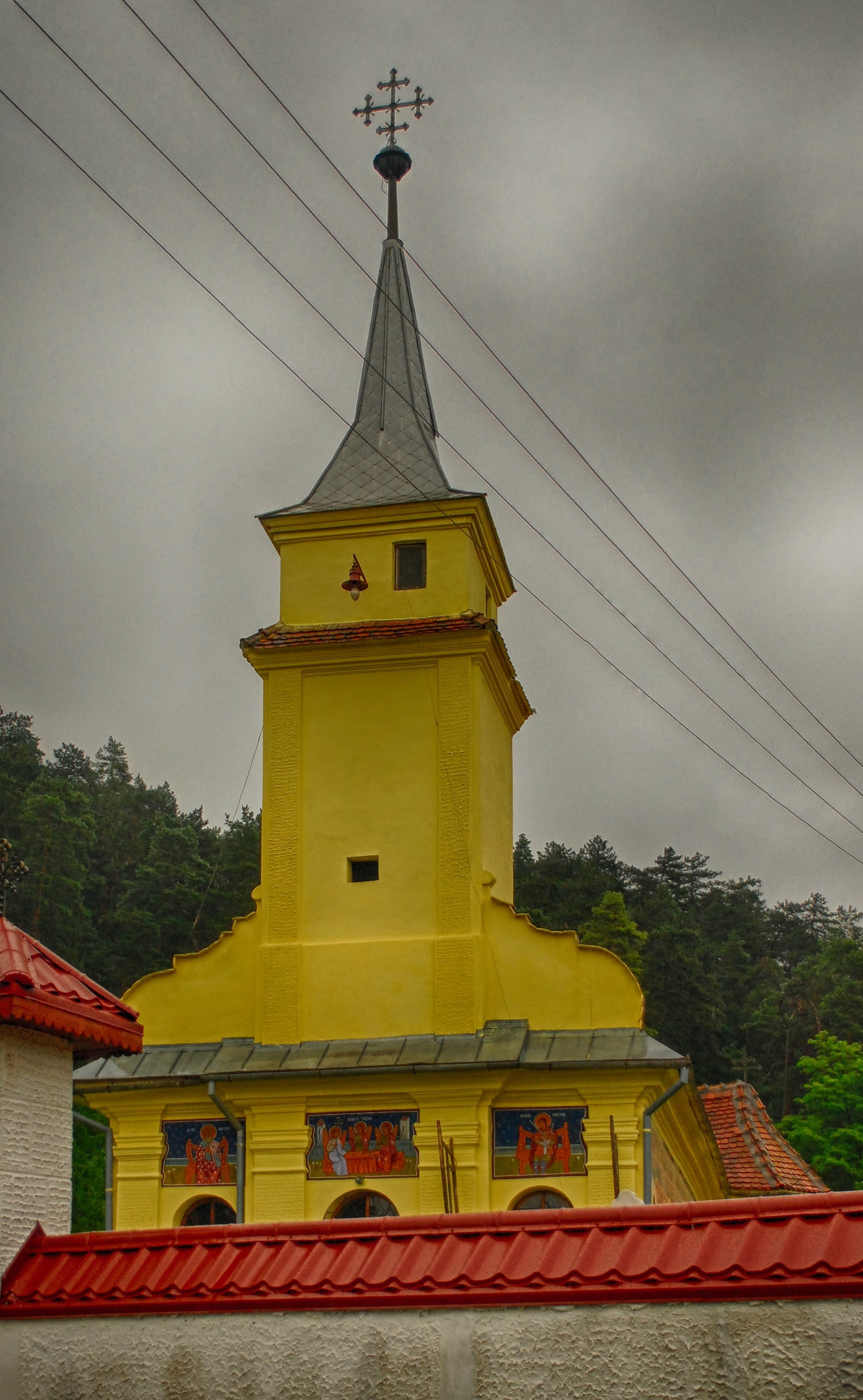
- The Orthodox St. Demetrius Church

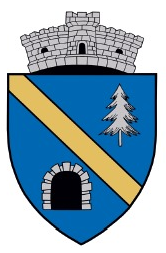
- Coat of arms

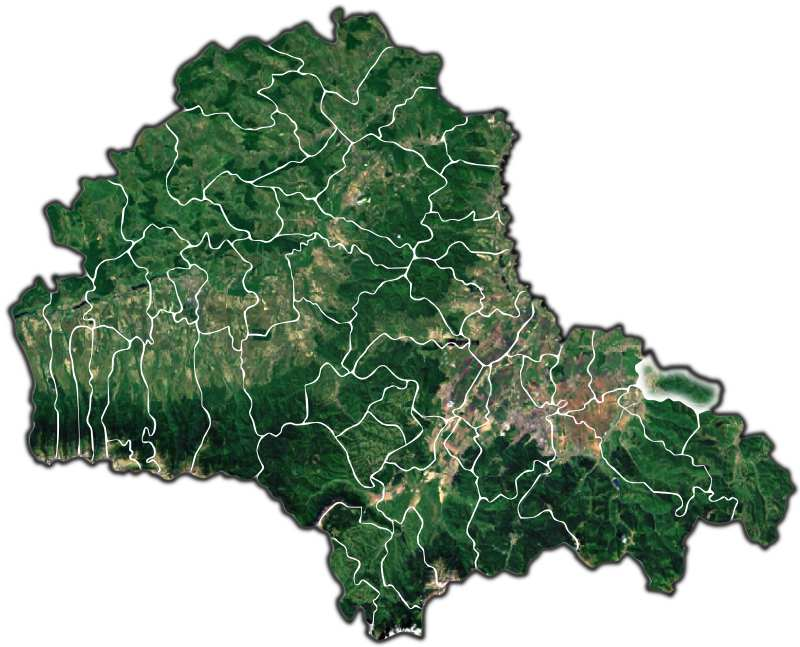
- Location within the county

- Location in Romania
- Coordinates: 45°42′N 25°51′E
- Country: Romania
- County: Brașov

Government
  - Mayor (2020–2024): Gheorghe Boalii (PSD)
- Area: 40.26 km^{2} (15.54 sq mi)
- Elevation: 546 m (1,791 ft)
- Population (2021-12-01): 4,468
  - Density: 111.0/km^{2} (287.4/sq mi)
- Time zone: UTC+02:00 (EET)
  - Summer (DST): UTC+03:00 (EEST)
- Postal code: 507225
- Area code: (+40) 02 68
- Vehicle reg.: BV
- Website: www.primariateliu.ro

Teliu (Hungarian: Keresztvár, Nyén, Nyény; German: Kreuzburg) is a commune in Brașov County, Transylvania, Romania. It is composed of a single village, Teliu.

== Geography ==
The commune is located in the eastern part of the county, on the banks of the river Teliu. It lies on the border with Covasna County, at a distance of 18 km (11 mi) from the city of Săcele and 25 km (16 mi) from the county seat, Brașov. Teliu is traversed by the National Road DN10, which connects it to Hărman commune to the west and the town of Întorsura Buzăului to the east.

There is also a railroad that links Brașov and Întorsura Buzăului which goes through the Teliu Tunnel that crosses the Întorsurii Mountains. With a length of 4,369.5 m (14,336 ft), this is the longest railway tunnel in Romania.

== Demographics ==
Historical population
Year	Pop.	±%
1850	1,897	—
1930	3,725	+96.4%
1977	3,740	+0.4%
2002	3,710	−0.8%
2011	4,198	+13.2%
2021	4,468	+6.4%
Source: Census data

At the 2011 census, Teliu had 4,198 inhabitants, of which 57.7% were Romanians, 22.2% Hungarians, and 19.1% Roma. At the 2021 census, the commune had a population of 4,468; of those, 50,98% were Romanians, 30.66% Roma, and 14.01% Hungarians.

== See also ==
- Dacian fortress of Teliu
