= Tărlungeni =

Tărlungeni Tatrang
- Commune
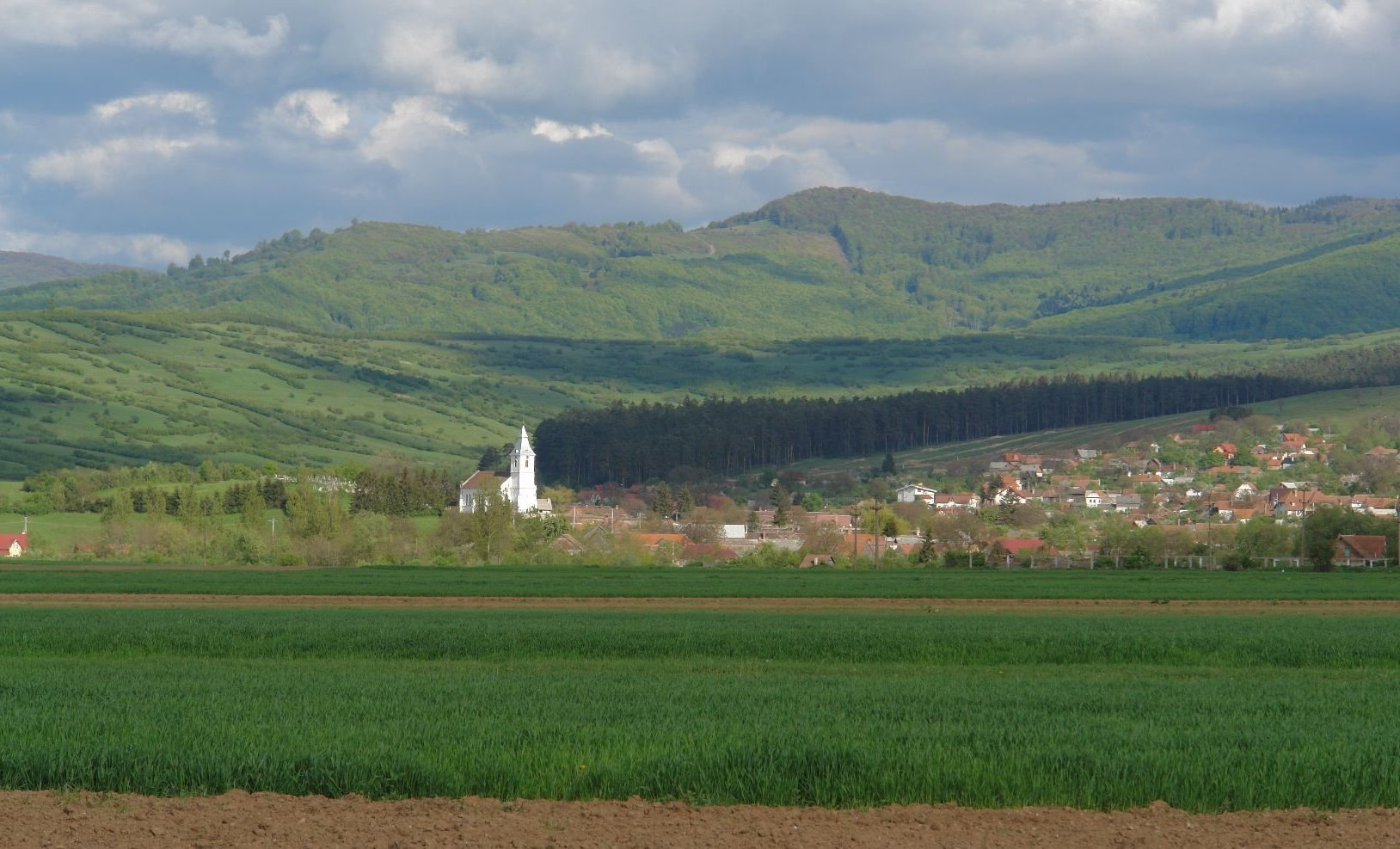
- View of Purcăreni

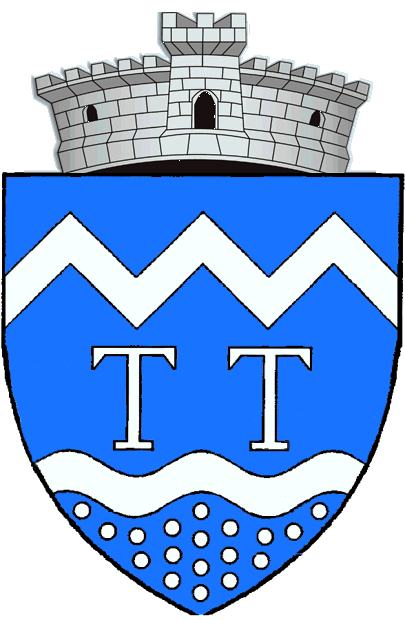
- Coat of arms

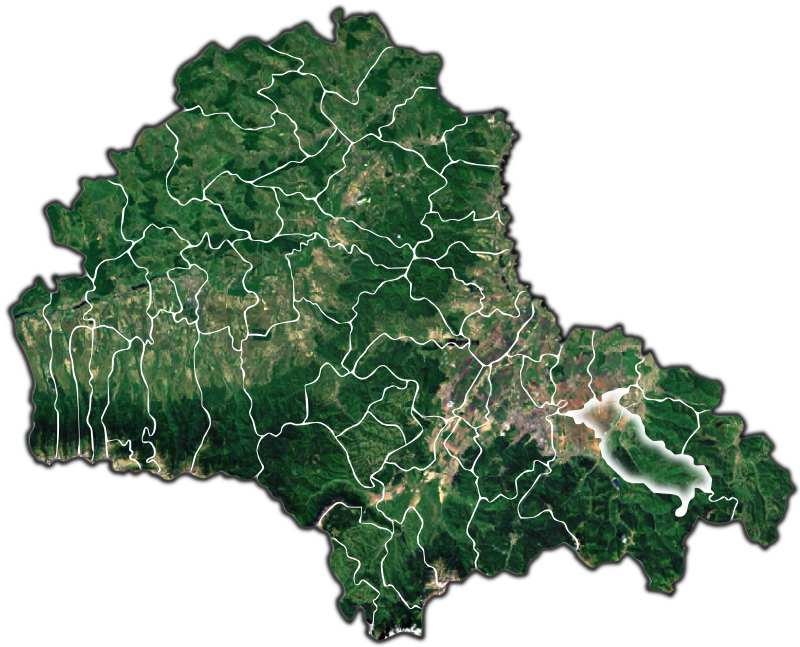
- Location within the county

- Location in Romania
- Coordinates: 45°38′N 25°45′E
- Country: Romania
- County: Brașov

Government
  - Mayor (2020–2024): Severius-Florin Beșchea (PNL)
- Area: 135.66 km^{2} (52.38 sq mi)
- Elevation: 600 m (2,000 ft)
- Population (2021-12-01): 12,067
  - Density: 88.950/km^{2} (230.38/sq mi)
- Time zone: UTC+02:00 (EET)
  - Summer (DST): UTC+03:00 (EEST)
- Postal code: 507220
- Area code: (+40) 02 68
- Vehicle reg.: BV
- Website: comunatarlungeni.ro

Tărlungeni (German: Tatrangen; Hungarian: Tatrang) is a commune in Brașov County, Transylvania, Romania. It is composed of four villages: Cărpiniș (Kerpenest), Purcăreni (Pürkerec), Tărlungeni, and Zizin (Zajzon).

The commune is located in the southeastern part of the county, just east of the county seat, Brașov, and belongs to the Brașov metropolitan area. Tărlungeni lies on the banks of the river Tărlung and its affluent, the Zizin.

The first attestation of the locality dates back to November 4, 1484, when the voivode of Transylvania, Stephen V Báthory, came to Brașov to mediate a dispute between the villages of Prejmer and Tărlungeni over the usage of the waters of the river Tărlung.

At the 2021 census, Tărlungeni had a population of 12,067, of which 38.53% were Romanians, 28.88% Roma, and 27.42% Hungarians. At the 2011 census, the commune had 8,320 inhabitants; of those, 39.9% were Romanians, 30.7% Roma, and 29.1% Hungarians. At the 2002 census, 61.3% were Romanian Orthodox, 31.2% Evangelical Lutheran, 3.6% Pentecostal and 1.1% Roman Catholic.

Zizin is known for its mineral water springs, originating from the phreatic zone of the Ciucaș Mountains; the first official description of the springs dates from 1773.

From 1983 to 2016 the Liga II football club CS Unirea Tărlungeni was based in the commune.

Historical population
Year	Pop.	±%
1850	5,764	—
1920	6,991	+21.3%
1977	7,662	+9.6%
2002	7,399	−3.4%
2011	8,320	+12.4%
2021	12,067	+45.0%
Source: Census data

== Natives ==
- György Barkó (1931–2024), Romanian and Hungarian actor
- Ștefan Foriș (1892–1946), Romanian communist activist

== See also ==
- Toma Roman Jr (October 21, 2012). "Cum l-a învins capitalismul pe Ceaușescu. Magazinul mixt din hogeacul cârmaciului". Jurnalul Național (in Romanian).
