= Budila =

- Commune
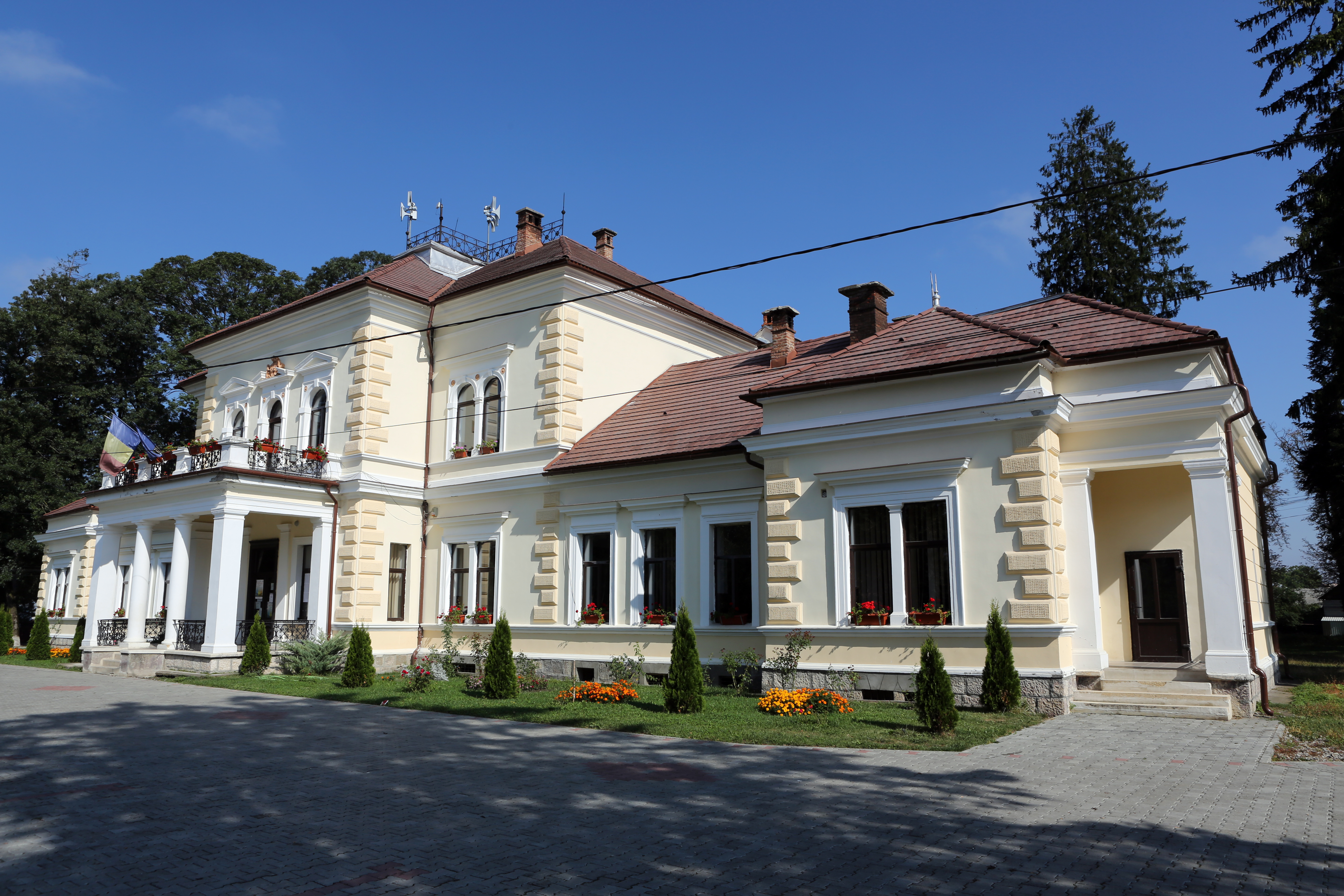
- Béldy László Castle (now town hall)

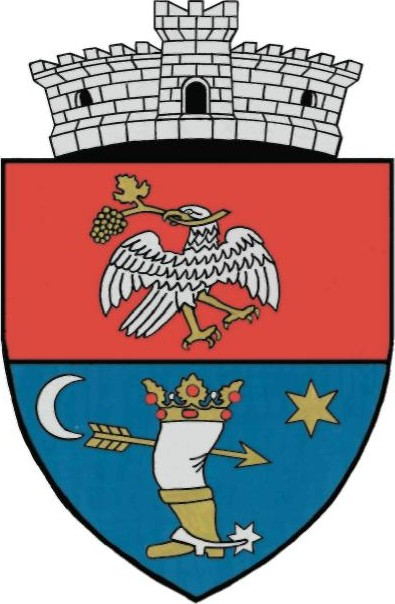
- Coat of arms

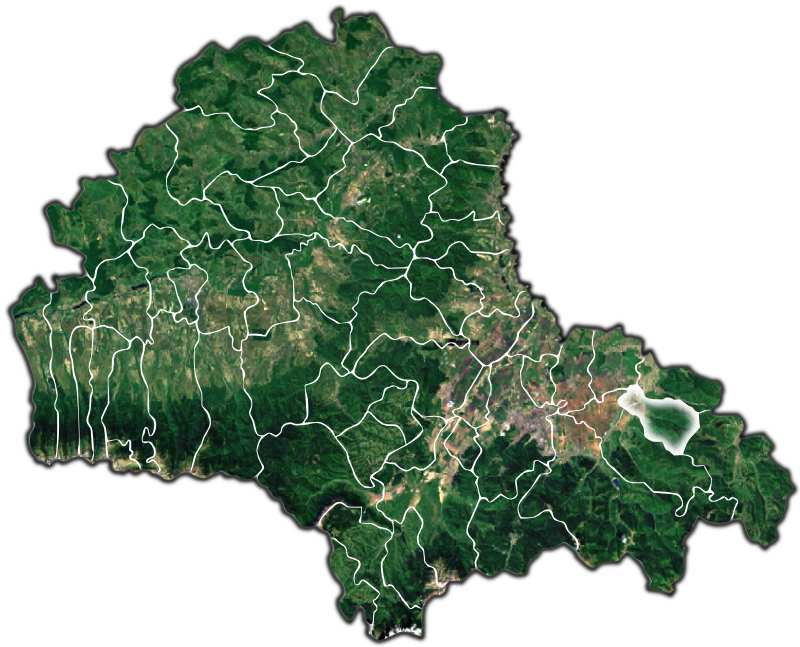
- Location within the county

- Location in Romania
- Coordinates: 45°40′N 25°48′E
- Country: Romania
- County: Brașov

Government
  - Mayor (2020–2024): Irimia Marșavela (PNL)
- Area: 58.75 km^{2} (22.68 sq mi)
- Elevation: 561 m (1,841 ft)
- Population (2021-12-01): 4,926
  - Density: 83.85/km^{2} (217.2/sq mi)
- Time zone: UTC+02:00 (EET)
  - Summer (DST): UTC+03:00 (EEST)
- Postal code: 507030
- Area code: +(40) 268
- Vehicle reg.: BV
- Website: budila.ro

Budila (German: Bodeln; Hungarian: Bodola) is a commune in Brașov County, Transylvania, Romania. It is composed of a single village, Budila.

== Geography ==
The commune is located in the southeastern part of the county, 12 km (7.5 mi) from the city of Săcele and 19 km (12 mi) from the county seat, Brașov. It lies on the southern bank of the river Tărlung; the rivers Zizin and Seaca flow into the Tărlung in Budila.

== Demographics ==
Historical population
Year	Pop.	±%
1850	1,568	—
1920	1,807	+15.2%
1977	2,923	+61.8%
2002	3,484	+19.2%
2011	4,197	+20.5%
2021	4,926	+17.4%
Source: Census data

At the 2021 census, Budila had a population of 4,926; of those, 58.08% were Romanians, 24.77% Roma, and 9.4% Hungarians. At the 2011 census, 77.2% of the 4,197 inhabitants were Romanians, 16.5% Hungarians, and 6.1% Roma. At the 2002 census, 68.2% were Romanian Orthodox, 18.3% Reformed, 7.6% Pentecostal and 3.6% Roman Catholic.

== Castles ==
- Béldy László Castle,
- Béldi Pál Castle
- Mikes Castle
- Nemes Castle
