= Dobârlău =

Commune in Covasna County, Romania

- Commune
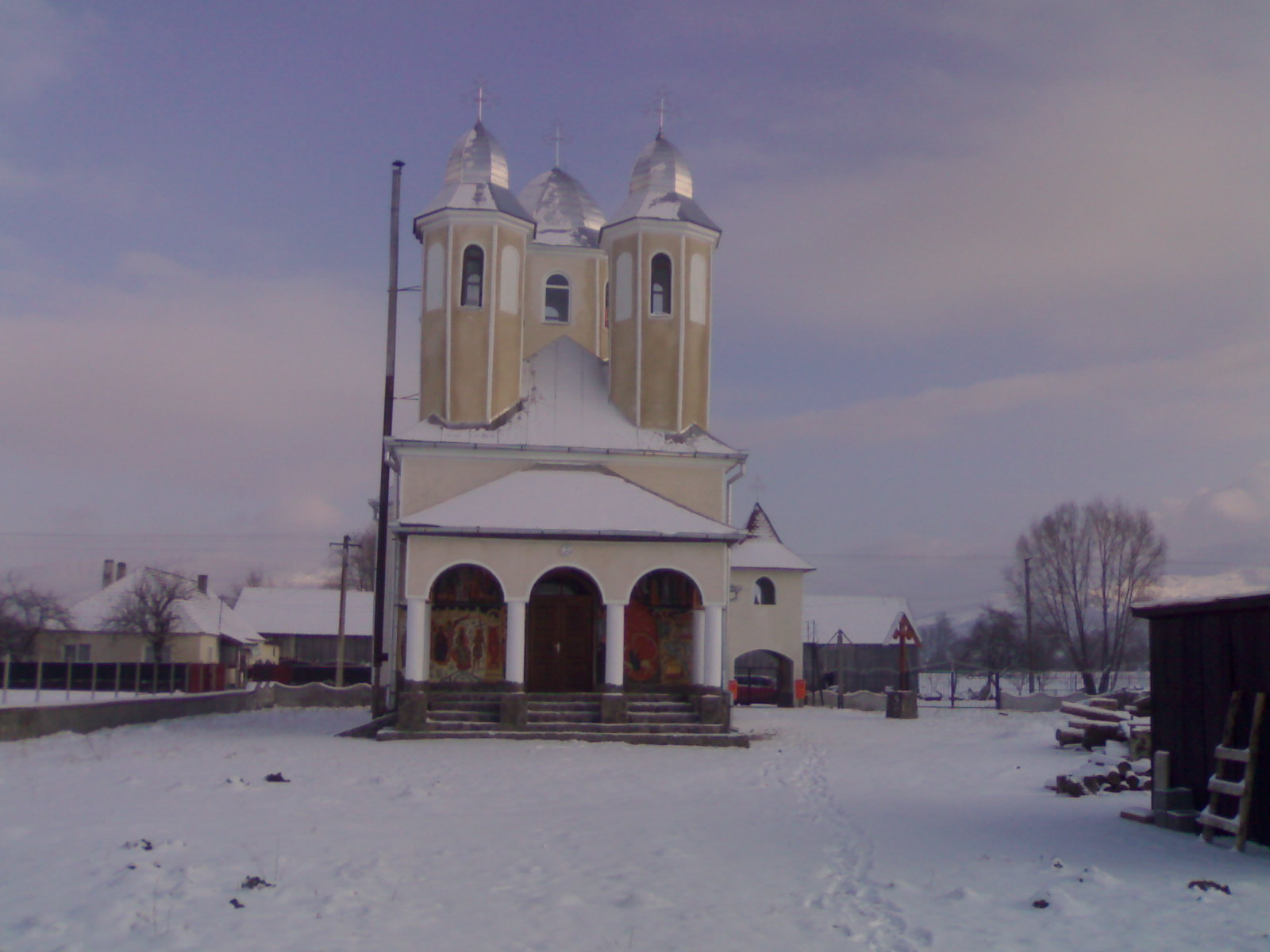
- Church in Lunca Mărcușului

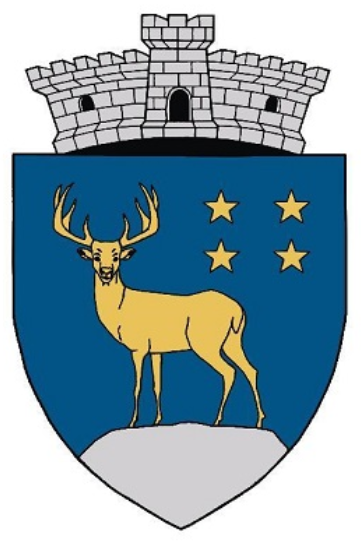
- Coat of arms

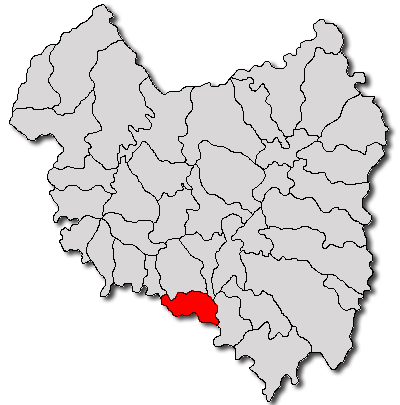
- Location in Covasna County

- Location in Romania
- Coordinates: 45°44′N 25°53′E
- Country: Romania
- County: Covasna

Government
  - Mayor (2020–2024): Bogdan Barbu (PSD)
- Area: 50.36 km^{2} (19.44 sq mi)
- Elevation: 537 m (1,762 ft)
- Population (2021-12-01): 2,275
  - Density: 45.17/km^{2} (117.0/sq mi)
- Time zone: UTC+02:00 (EET)
  - Summer (DST): UTC+03:00 (EEST)
- Postal code: 527085
- Area code: (+40) 02 67
- Vehicle reg.: CV
- Website: primariadobarlau.ro

Dobârlău (Hungarian: Dobolló; German: Dobersdorf) is a commune in Covasna County, Transylvania, Romania. It is composed of four villages: Dobârlău, Lunca Mărcușului (Bélmező), Mărcuș (Márkos), and Valea Dobârlăului (Dobollópatak).

The commune is located in the southern part of the county, on the border with Brașov County. It lies on the banks of the Dobârlău River.

At the 2021 census, Dobârlău had a population of 2,275, of which 91.87% were ethnic Romanians.
