= Dobârlău (river) =

- Location within Romania

Location
- Country: Romania
- Counties: Covasna County
- Villages: Valea Dobârlăului, Dobârlău

Physical characteristics
- Mouth: Tărlung
  - location: Lunca Mărcușului
  - coordinates: 45.7372°N 25.8407°E
- Length: 16 km (9.9 mi)
- Basin size: 45 km^{2} (17 sq mi)

Basin features
- Progression: Tărlung→ Râul Negru→ Olt→ Danube→ Black Sea
- Tributaries
  - left: Mărcuș

The Dobârlău is a right tributary of the river Tărlung in Covasna County, Romania. It flows into the Tărlung in Lunca Mărcușului. Its length is 16 km (9.9 mi) and its basin size is 45 km^{2} (17 sq mi).
