= Moieciu =

- Commune
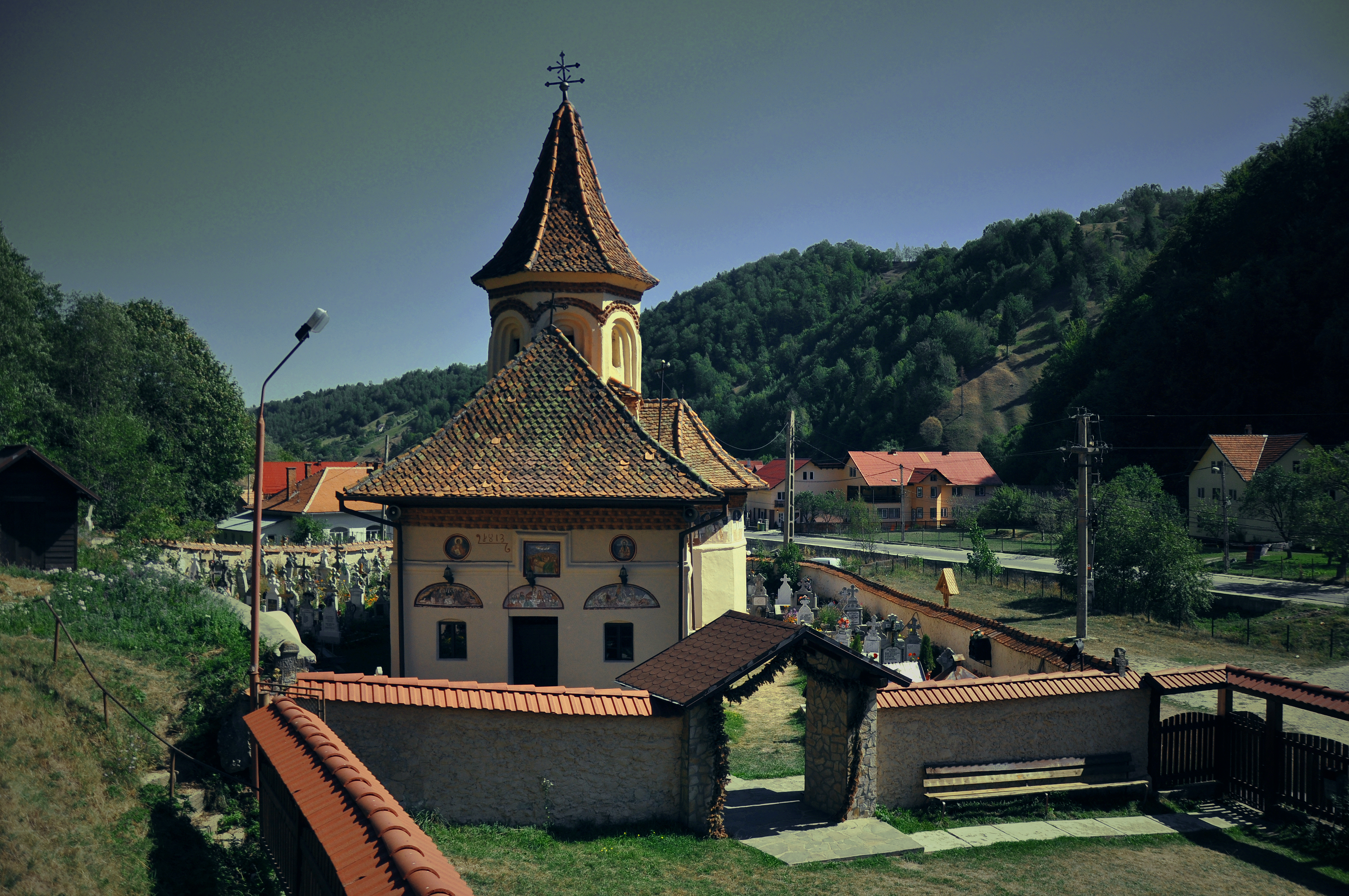

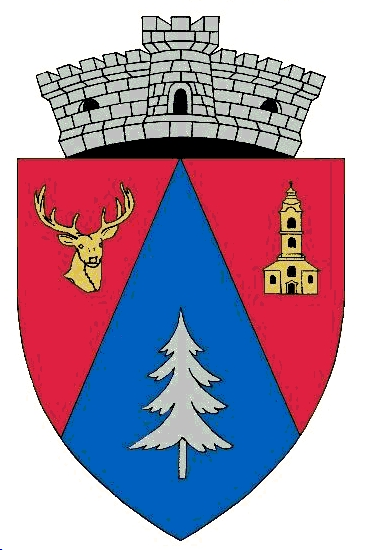
- Coat of arms

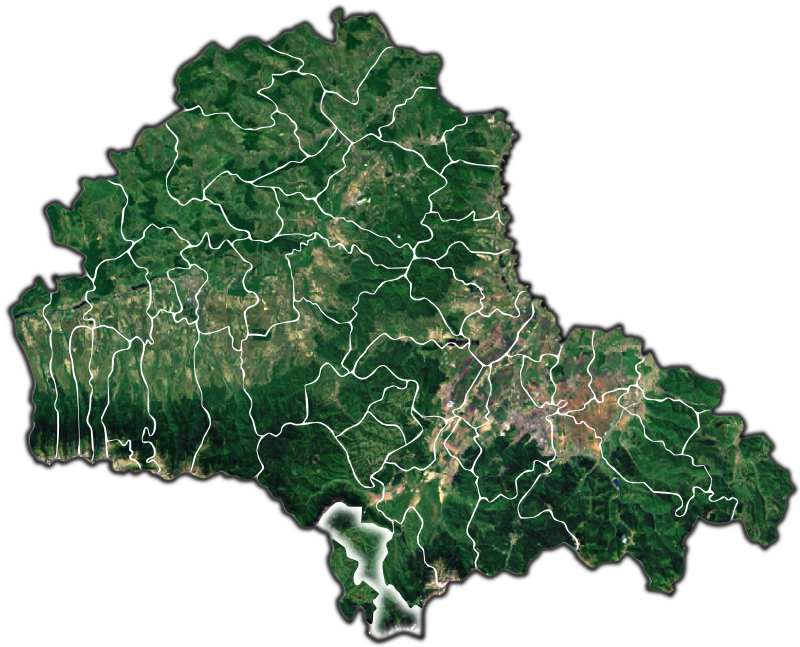
- Location in Brașov County

- Location in Romania
- Coordinates: 45°30′28″N 25°20′33″E
- Country: Romania
- County: Brașov

Government
  - Mayor (2020–2024): Ioniță-Mircea Manea (PNL)
- Area: 94.91 km^{2} (36.64 sq mi)
- Elevation: 794 m (2,605 ft)
- Highest elevation: 1,200 m (3,900 ft)
- Population (2021-12-01): 4,556
  - Density: 48.00/km^{2} (124.3/sq mi)
- Time zone: UTC+02:00 (EET)
  - Summer (DST): UTC+03:00 (EEST)
- Postal code: 507130
- Area code: +(40) x68
- Vehicle reg.: BV
- Website: primariamoieciu.ro

Moieciu (German: Mösch; Hungarian: Alsómoécs) is a commune in Brașov County, Transylvania, Romania. It is located 29 km (18 mi) south of Brașov, within the Rucăr-Bran Pass.

The commune is composed of six villages: Cheia (Kheja), Drumul Carului, Măgura (Magura), Moieciu de Jos (the commune center), Moieciu de Sus (Felsőmoécs), and Peștera (Pestera). Măgura and Peștera are on the eastern side of the Piatra Craiului Mountains.

Historical population
Year	Pop.	±%
1850	3,403	—
1977	5,763	+69.4%
2002	4,784	−17.0%
2011	4,892	+2.3%
2021	4,556	−6.9%
Source: Census data
