= Bran, Brașov =

Bran
- Commune
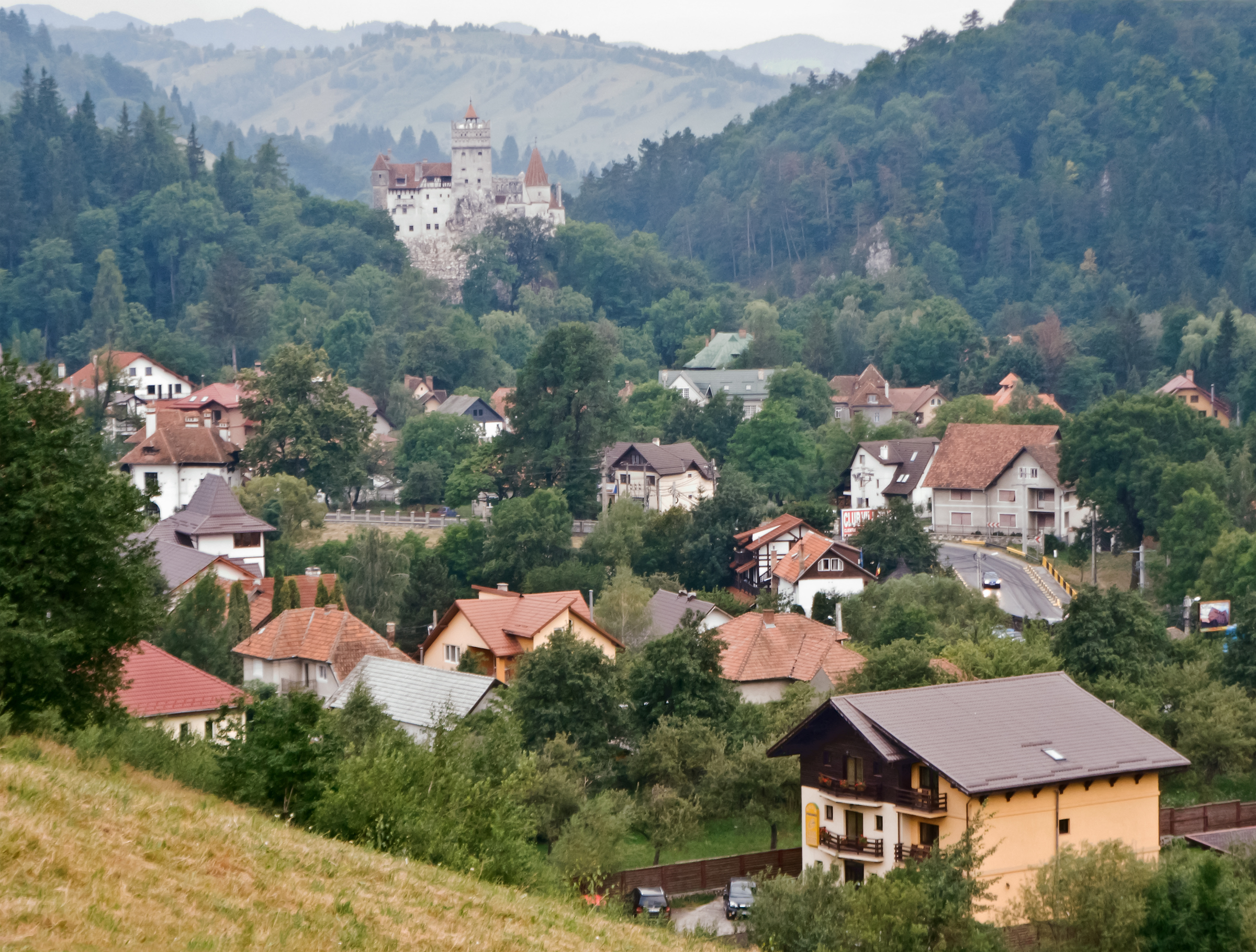

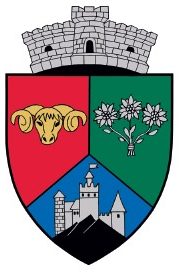
- Coat of arms

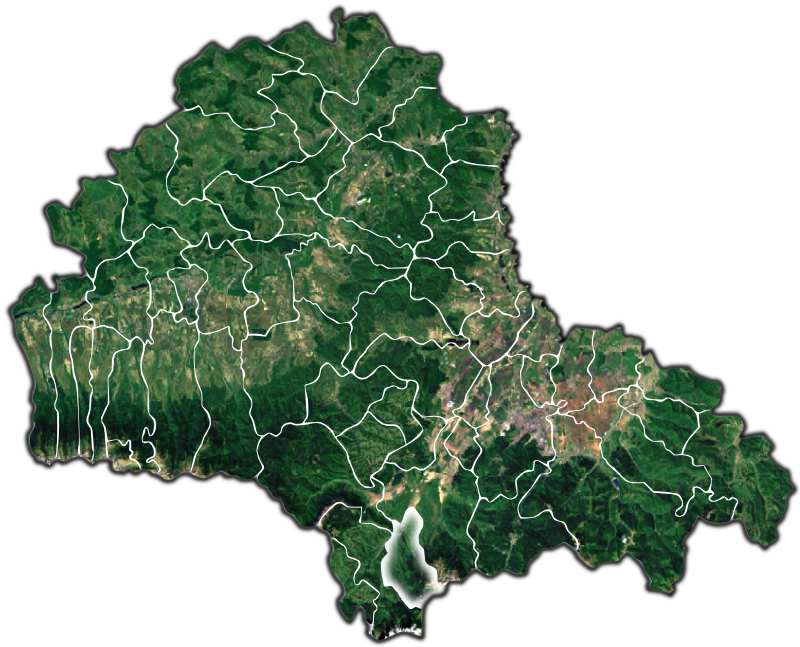
- Location of Bran within Brașov County

- Location in Romania
- Coordinates: 45°30′41″N 25°21′51″E
- Country: Romania
- County: Brașov

Government
  - Mayor (2020–2024): Cosmin Feroiu (PNL)
- Area: 79.1693 km^{2} (30.5674 sq mi)
- Elevation: 720 m (2,360 ft)
- Population (2021-12-01): 4,866
  - Density: 61.46/km^{2} (159.2/sq mi)
- Time zone: UTC+02:00 (EET)
  - Summer (DST): UTC+03:00 (EEST)
- Postal code: 507025
- Area code: (+40) 02 68
- Vehicle reg.: BV
- Website: primariabran.ro

Bran (German: Törzburg; Hungarian: Törcsvár) is a commune in Brașov County, Transylvania, Romania. It is about 25 kilometres (16 mi) southwest of the city of Brașov and consists of five villages: Bran, Poarta, Predeluț, Șimon, and Sohodol.

The medieval Bran Castle is a popular tourist destination, partly because it has been promoted by the Romanian tourism industry as having been the home of Dracula in Bram Stoker's novel of the same name. The castle has been listed as one of the Seven Wonders of Romania.

== Geography ==
Bran is located in the southern part of Brașov County, on or near the border with Dâmbovița and Argeș counties, and belongs to the historical sub-region of Țara Bârsei (Burzenland). It lies at the northern end of the Rucăr-Bran Pass; national road DN73, which runs through the pass, connects Brașov to Pitești, 111 km (69 mi) to the southwest.

The commune is situated between two mountain ranges of the Southern Carpathians: to the southeast are the Bucegi Mountains, with the Omu Peak dominating the area, at 2,505 m (8,219 ft); and to the west are the Piatra Craiului Mountains, which top out at 2,238 m (7,343 ft).

== History ==
The Teutonic Order began building a wooden fort called Dietrichstein here early in the 13th century. After the fort's destruction in 1242 by Mongols ("Tatars"), King Sigismund of Hungary ordered a stone castle to be built in 1377, while the settlement of Bran began to develop nearby. Positioned high atop a steep cliff, the castle guarded a strategic trade route between Transylvania and Wallachia. In 1498, Bran came under the jurisdiction of Brașov.

After the Ottoman Empire defeated the Kingdom of Hungary in the 16th century, Bran became part of the Eastern Hungarian Kingdom and the Principality of Transylvania, which eventually became part of the Habsburg monarchy. In 1804 the commune became part of the Austrian Empire along with the Grand Principality of Transylvania, and in 1867 the Hungarian section of the Austro-Hungarian Empire.

The Hungarian names of the villages were Hungarian: Törcsvár for Bran (cf. German: Törzburg), Hungarian: Porta for Poarta, Kispredeál (lit. 'Little Predeal') for Predeluț, Simon for Șimon, and Szohodol for Sohodol.

In the wake of the First World War, Transylvania became part of Romania. On 1 December 1920, the citizenry of the historically Saxon city of Kronstadt (Brașov), represented by the city council under mayor Karl Schnell, presented the castle as a gift to Queen Marie of Romania. The queen transformed it into a royal residence in the 1920s, and today it is one of Romania's most popular visitor sites. It is open to tourists, who can view the inside alone or as part of a guided tour.

Outside the castle is an open-air museum with traditional Romanian farm houses and manufacturing facilities from the Bran region. As of 2024-2025, due to an ongoing trial regarding land property rights, the houses could only be visited from outside.

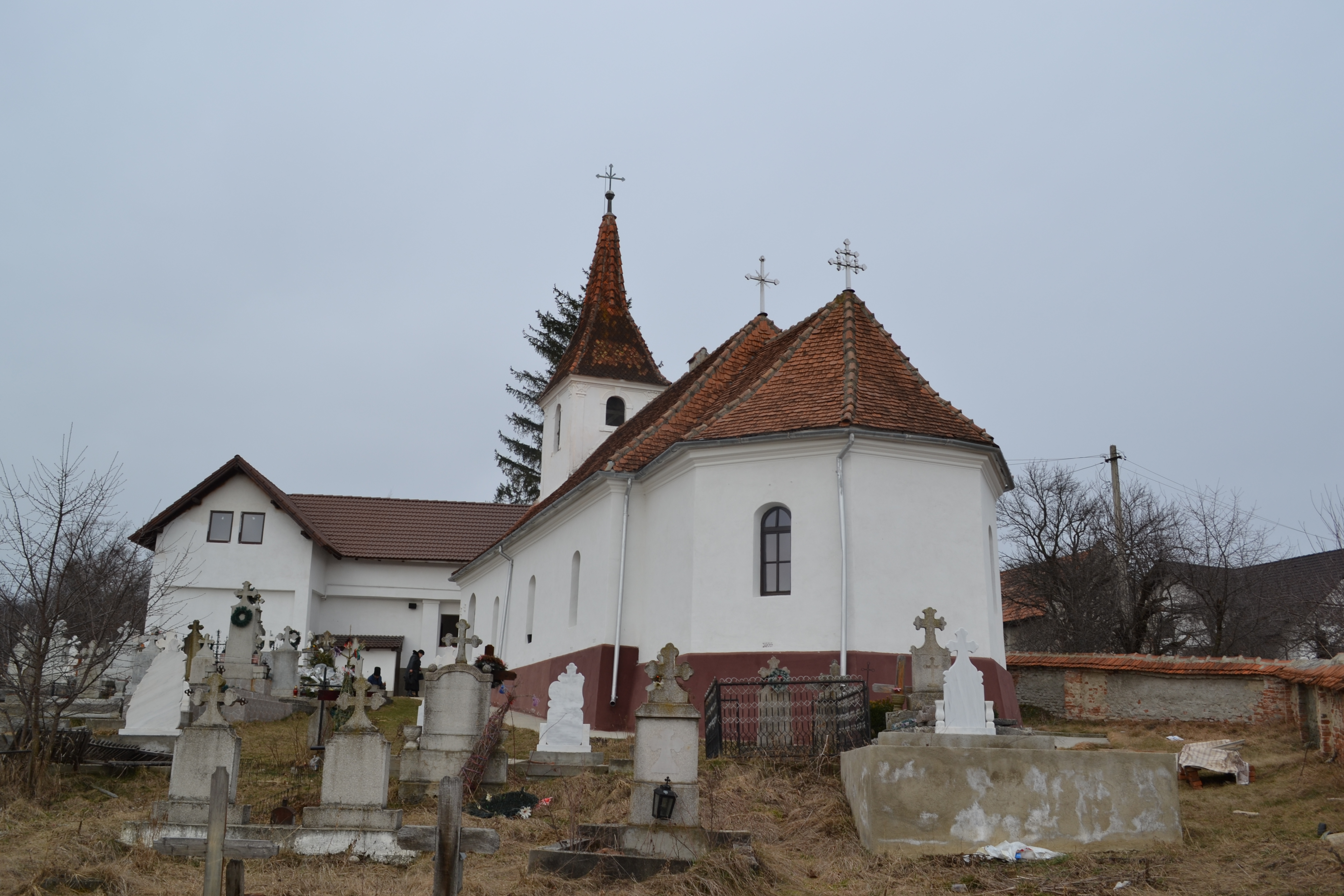
Romanian Orthodox St Paraschiva Church, Sohodol (built 1812, architect Kreutzer, fresco from 1817)

== Demographic evolution ==
Historical population
Year	Pop.	±%
1850	3,896	—
1930	4,737	+21.6%
1977	6,029	+27.3%
2002	5,292	−12.2%
2011	5,181	−2.1%
2021	4,866	−6.1%
Source: Census data

== Notable natives ==
- Marian Blaj (born 1978), biathlete
- Ioan Pușcariu (1824–1911), historian and genealogist, member of the Romanian Academy
- Sextil Pușcariu (1877–1948), linguist and philologist
- Livia Reit (born 1978), cross-country skier
- Alexandra Stoian (born 1983), biathlete
