= Brașov County =

County of Romania

Brașov County Județul Brașov
- County
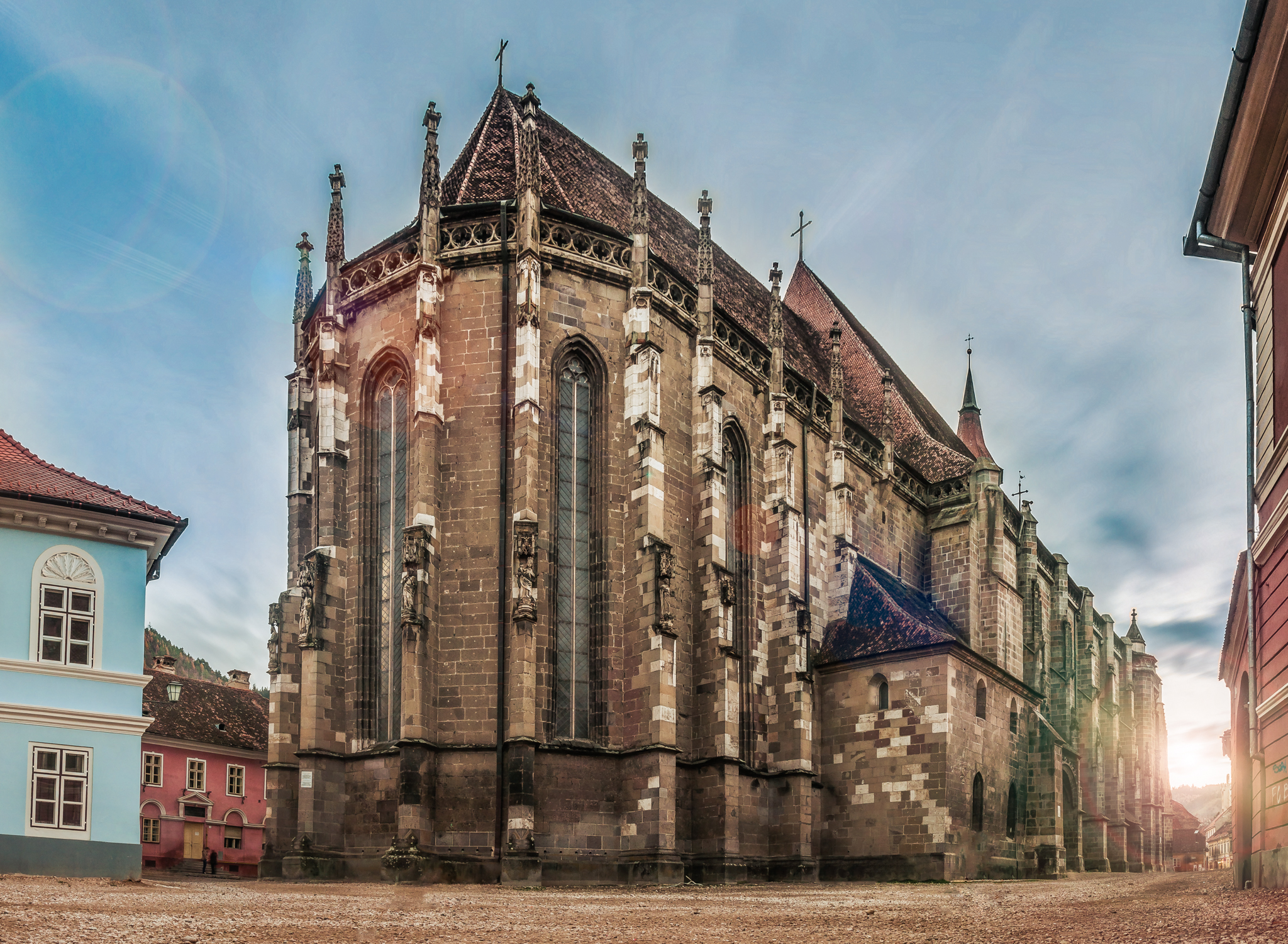
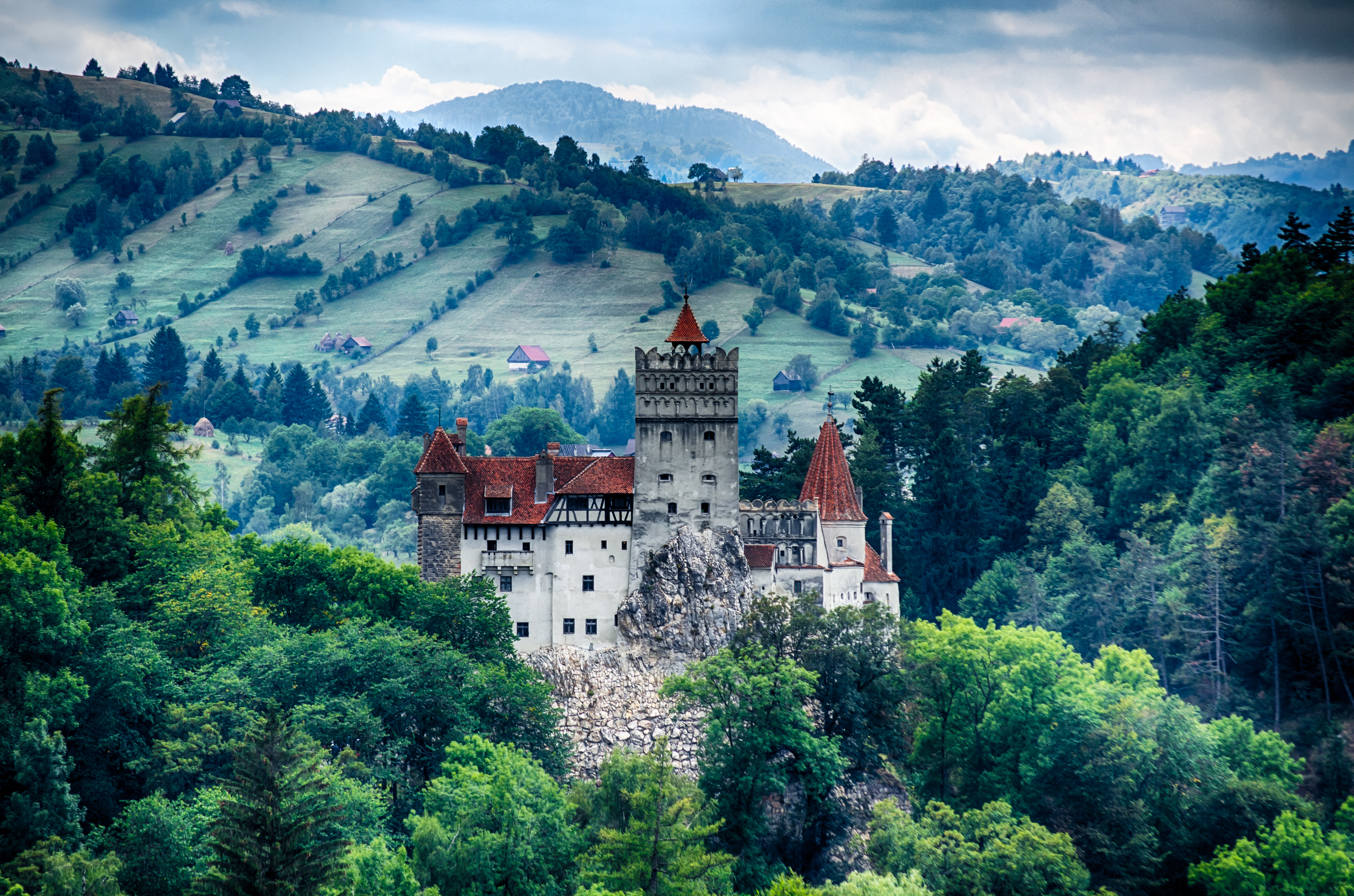
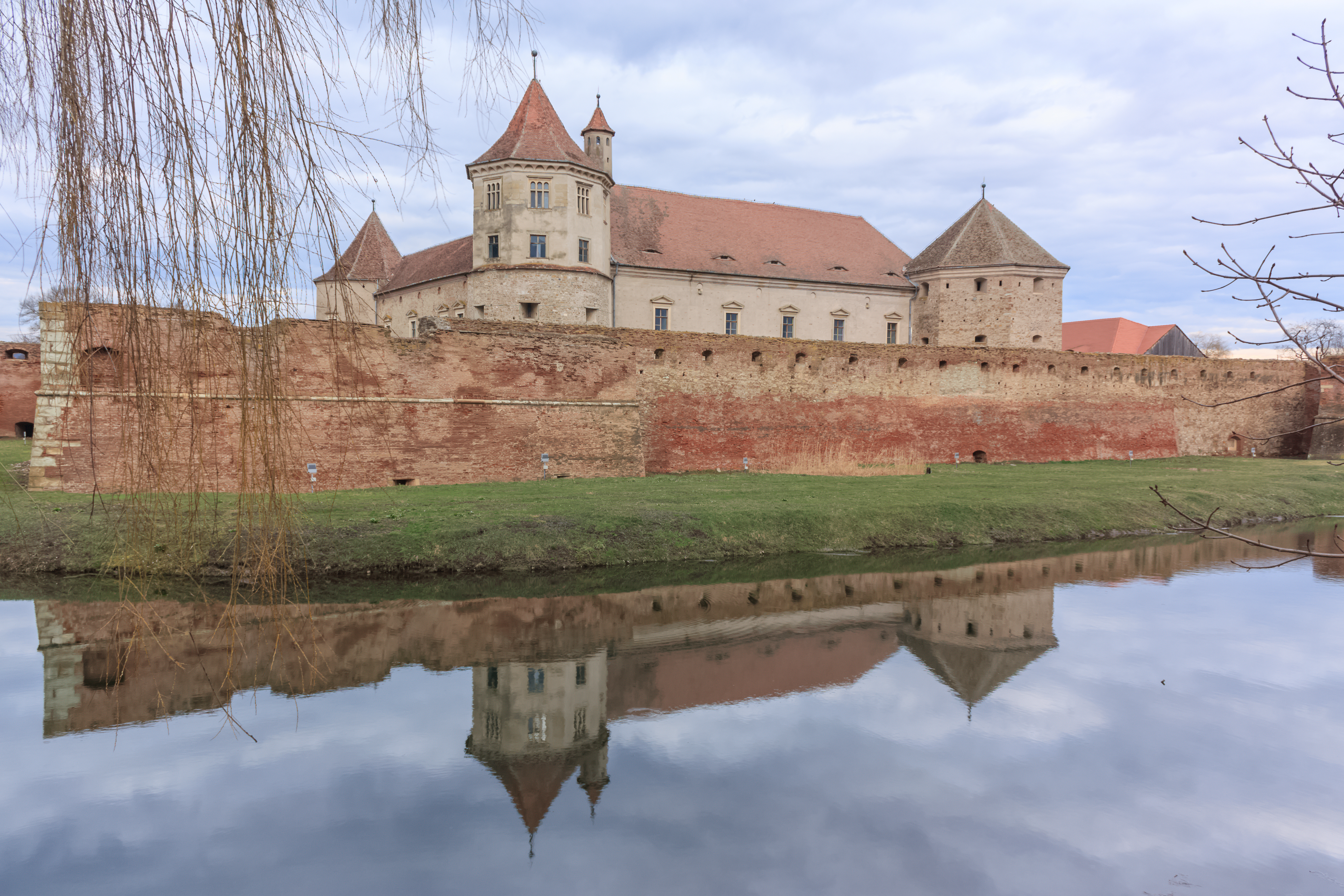
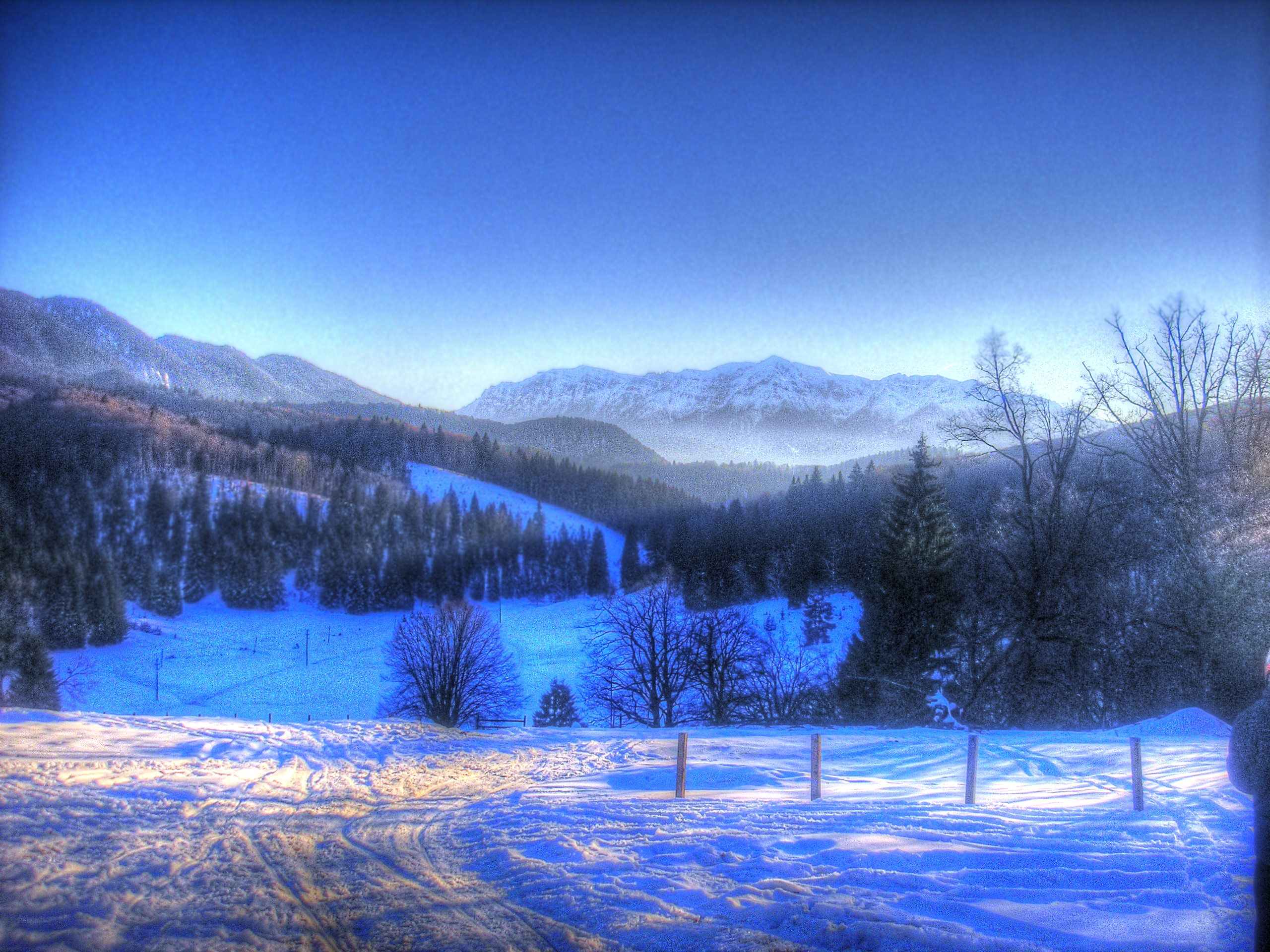
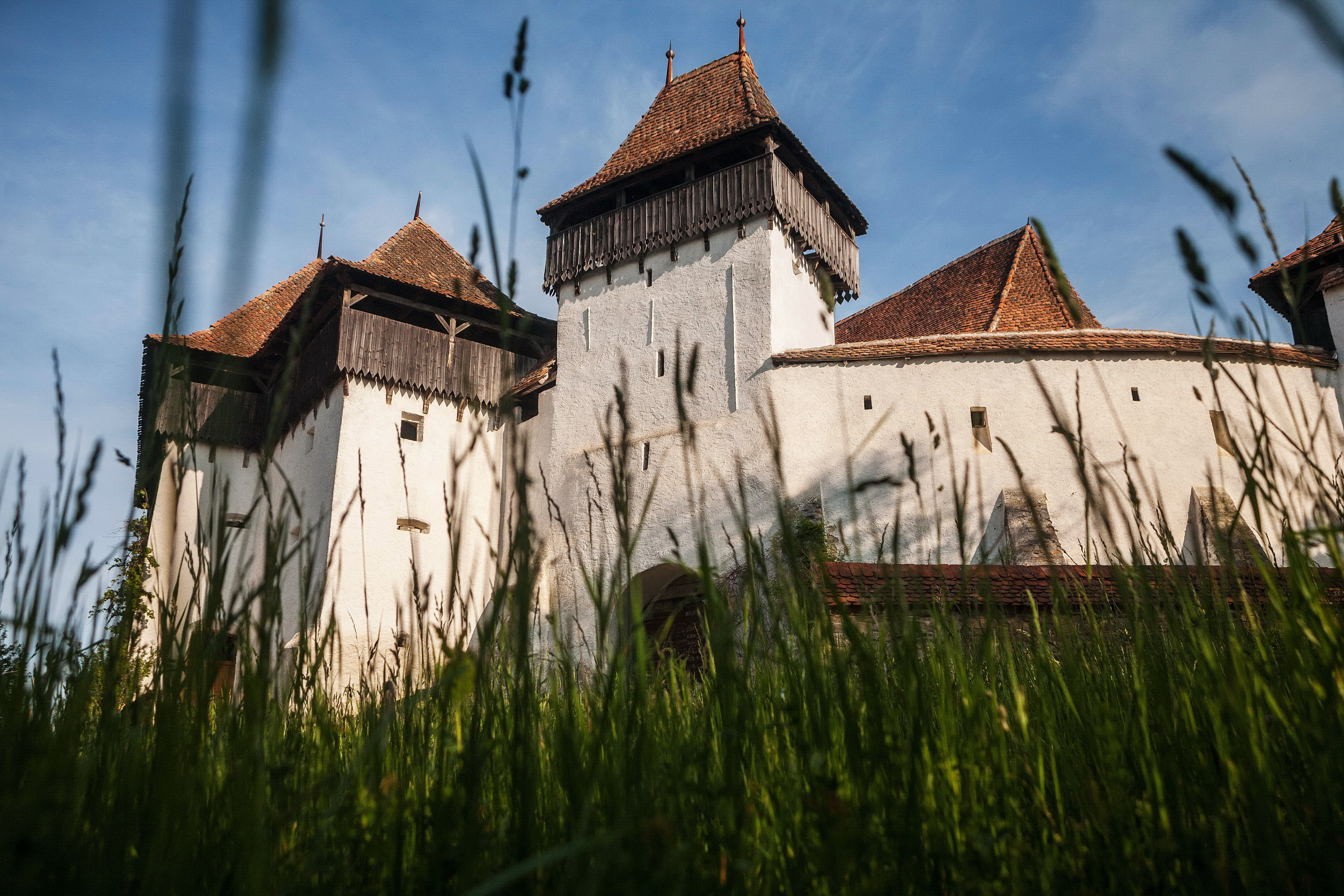
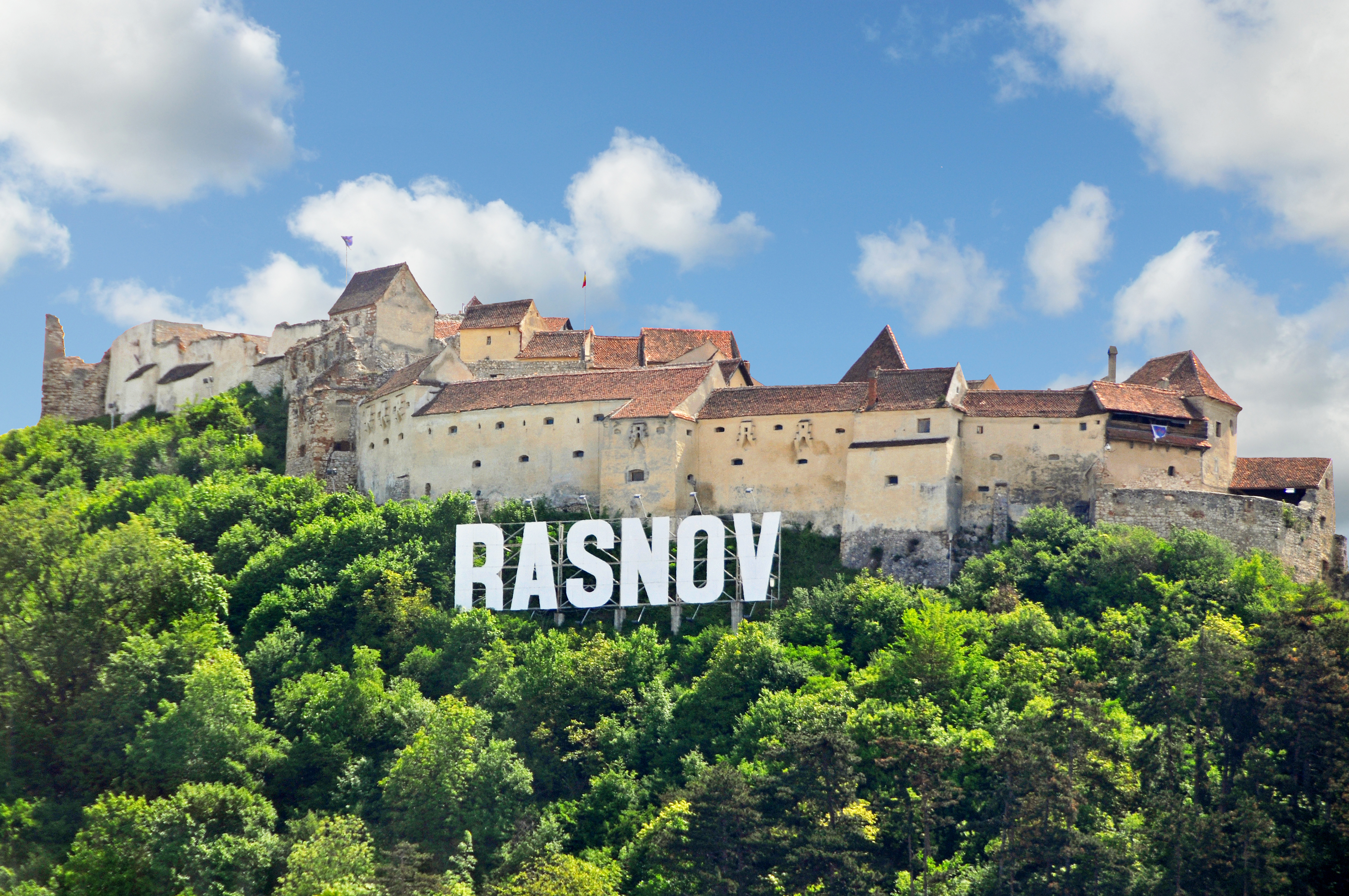
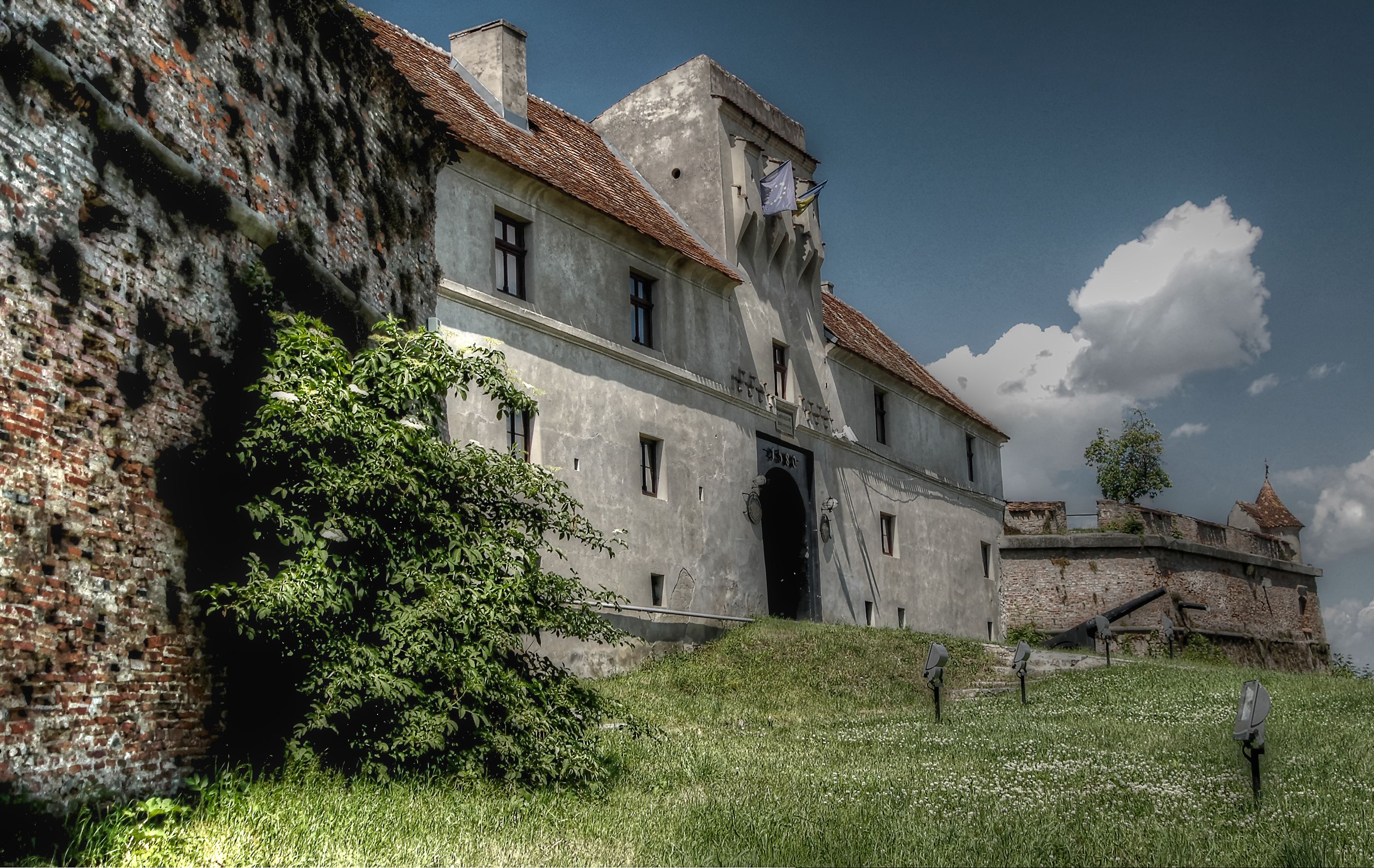
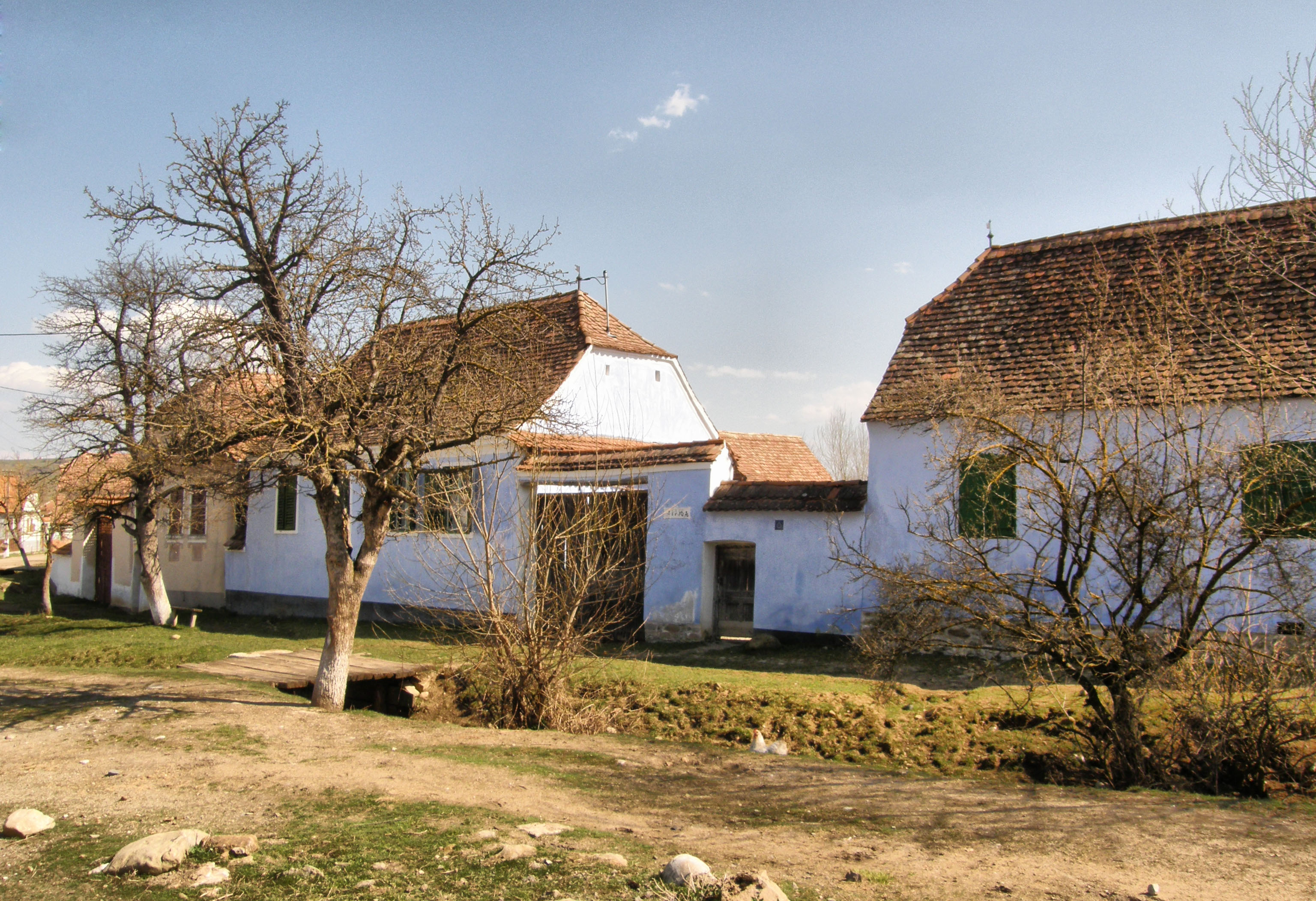
- Brașov Black Church Bran Castle Făgăraș Citadel Poiana Brașov Viscri fortified church Râșnov Fortress Brașov Fortress The House of Charles III in Viscri

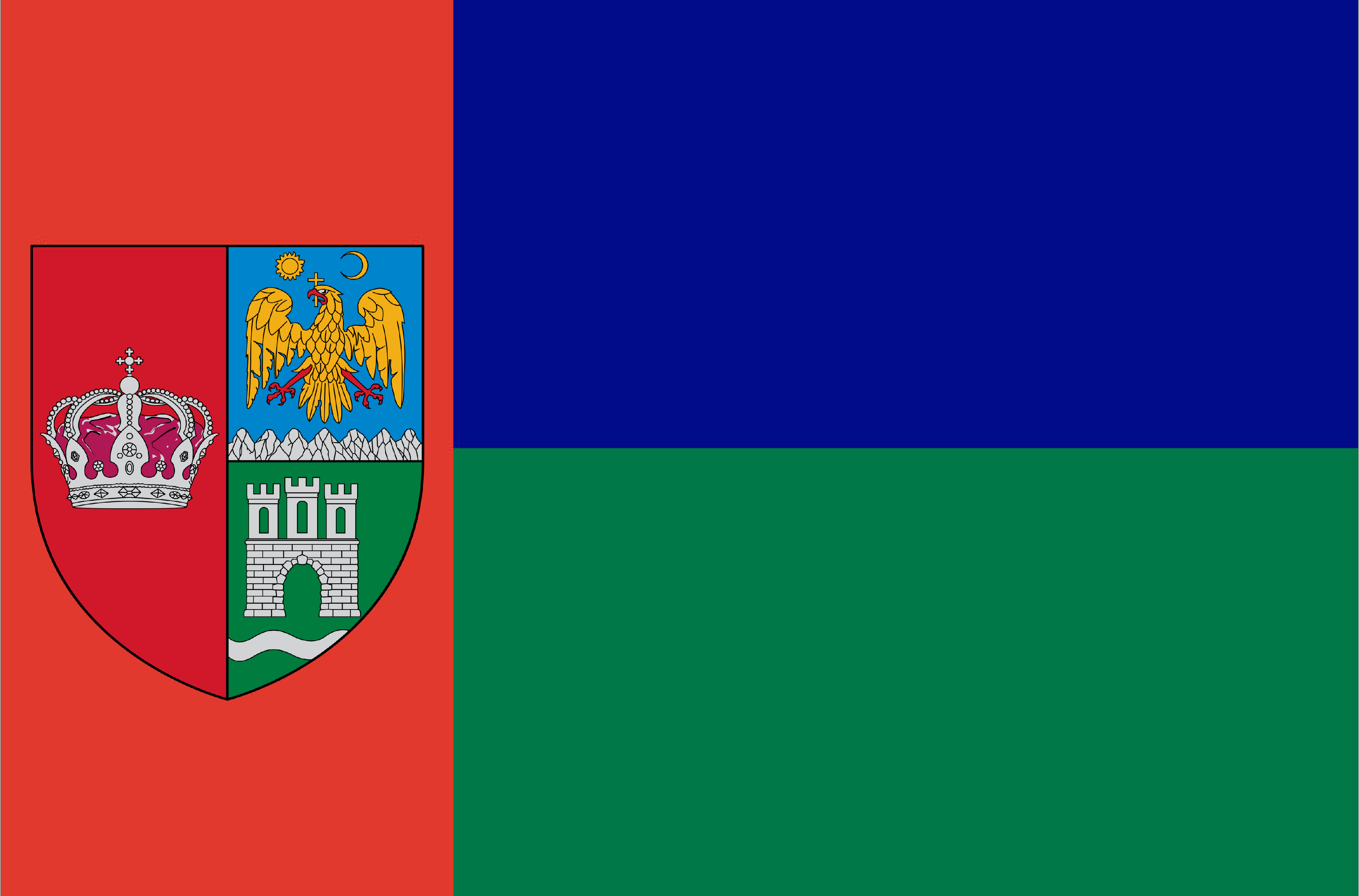
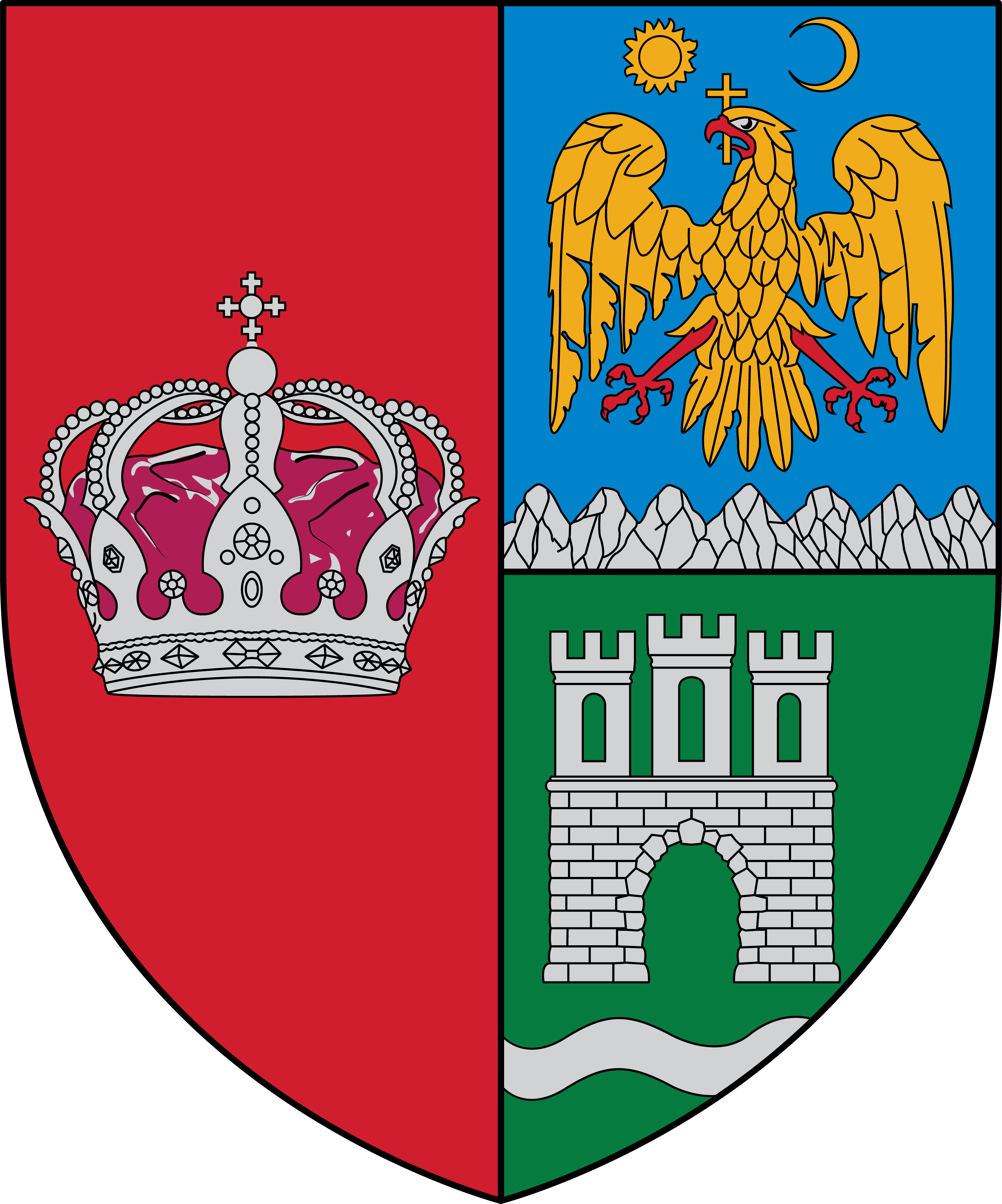
- Flag Coat of arms

- Location of Brașov County in Romania
- Coordinates: 45.79°N 25.28°E
- Country: Romania
- Development region^{1}: Centru
- Historic region: Transylvania
- Capital city (Reședință de județ): Brașov

Government
  - Type: County Council
  - President of the County Council: Adrian Veștea (PNL)
  - Prefect^{2}: Mihai-Cătălin Văsii

Area
  - Total: 5,363 km^{2} (2,071 sq mi)
  - Rank: 25th in Romania

Population (2021-12-01)
  - Total: 546,615
  - Rank: 13th in Romania
  - Density: 101.9/km^{2} (264.0/sq mi)
- Time zone: UTC+2 (EET)
  - Summer (DST): UTC+3 (EEST)
- Postal Code: 50wxyz^{3}
- Area code: +40 x68^{4}
- Car Plates: BV^{5}
- GDP nominal: US$ 14.070 billion (2025)
- GDP per capita: US$ 25,740 (2025)
- Website: County Council; County Prefecture
- ^{1}The development regions of Romania have no administrative role.^{2} as of 2007, the Prefect is not a politician, but a public functionary. He (or she) is not allowed to be a member of a political party, and is banned to have any political activity in the first six months after the resignation (or exclusion) from the public functionary corps^{3}w, x, y, and z are digits that indicate the city, the street, part of the street, or even the building of the address^{4}x is a digit indicating the operator: 2 for the former national operator, Romtelecom, and 3 for the other ground telephone networks^{5}used on both the plates of the vehicles that operate only in the county limits (like utility vehicles, ATVs, etc.), and the ones used outside the county

Brașov County (Romanian pronunciation: [braˈʃov]) is a county (județ) of Transylvania, Romania. Its capital city is Brașov. The county incorporates within its boundaries most of the Medieval "lands" (țări) Burzenland and Făgăraș.

== Name ==
In Hungarian, it is known as Brassó megye, and in German as Kreis Kronstadt. Under Austria-Hungary, a county with an identical name (Brassó County, Romanian: Comitatul Brașov) was created in 1876, covering a smaller area.

== Demographics ==
At the 2011 census, the county had a population of 549,217 and the population density was 102.4/km^{2} (265.2/sq mi).

- Romanians – 87.4%
- Hungarians – 7.77%
- Romas – 3.5%
- Germans (Transylvanian Saxons) – 0.65%

At the 2021 census, Brașov County had a population of 546,615 and the population density was 101.9/km^{2} (264.0/sq mi).

- Romanians – 88.33%
- Hungarians – 5,98%
- Romas – 4.98%
- Germans (Transylvanian Saxons) – 0.40%

Year	County population
1948	300,836
1956	373,941 ▲
1966	442,692 ▲
1977	582,863 ▲
1992	642,513 ▲
2002	589,028 ▼
2011	549,217 ▼
2021	546,615 ▼

Traditionally, the Romanian population was concentrated in the west and southwest of the county, the Hungarians in the east part of the county, and the Germans in the north and around Brașov city.

== Geography ==
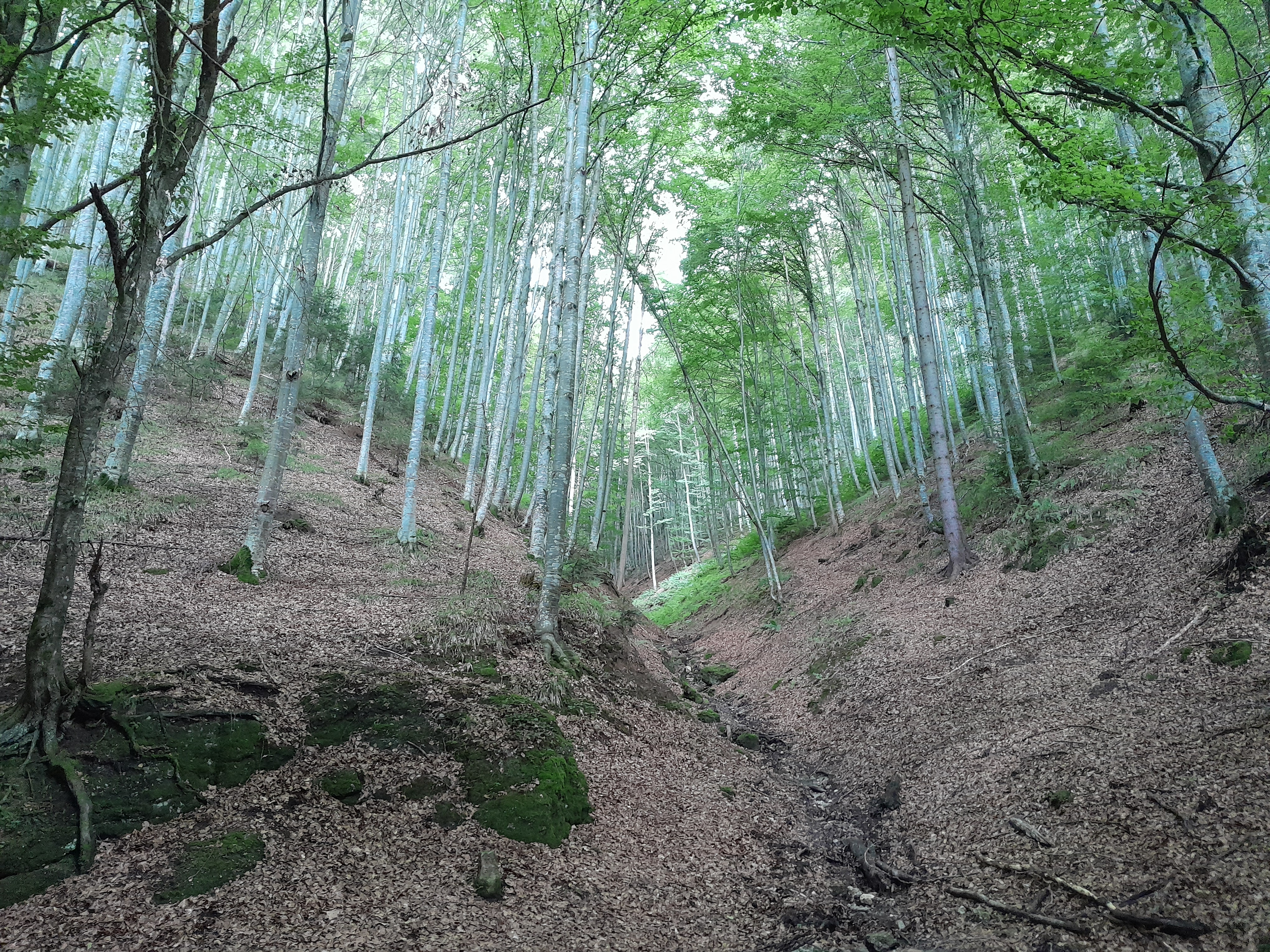
Forest in Brașov County

The county has a total area of 5,363 km^{2} (2,071 sq mi).

The south side comprises the Carpathian Mountains (Southern Carpathians and Eastern Carpathians), with the Făgăraș Mountains, the Bucegi Mountains, the Piatra Mare Mountains, the Piatra Craiului Mountains, and the Postăvarul Massif. In the east, there is the Brașov Depression, and in the west, there is the Olt River valley. Between them, there are the Perșani Mountains. The north and west sides of the county are crossed by the Olt River.

In the southern and central part of Brașov County lies the Burzenland, bordered approximately by Apața in the north, Bran in the southwest and Prejmer in the east, with Brașov roughly in the center. To the west lies Țara Făgărașului, bordered to the north by the Olt and to the south by the Făgăraș Mountains; its main city is Făgăraș.

=== Neighbours ===
- Covasna County in the east.
- Sibiu County in the west.
- Mureș County and Harghita County in the north.
- Argeș County, Dâmbovița County, and Prahova County in the south.
- Buzău County in the southeast.

== Economy ==
Brașov County is one of the most prosperous regions of Romania and has a tradition of industry. During World War II, IAR 80 and towards the end of the war, Bf 109, fighter aircraft were built in Brașov. During the communist period the county was heavily industrialized, which left it with some very large industrial complexes. Some of them managed to survive and adapt to the capitalist type market economy, but some did not, leading to a high rate of unemployment. Due to new investments, mainly foreign, the economy managed to partially recover.

The predominant industries in the county are:

- Mechanical and automotive industry.
- Chemical industry.
- Construction materials.
- Food industry.

Around Victoria there were big chemical complexes that polluted the region.

== Tourism ==
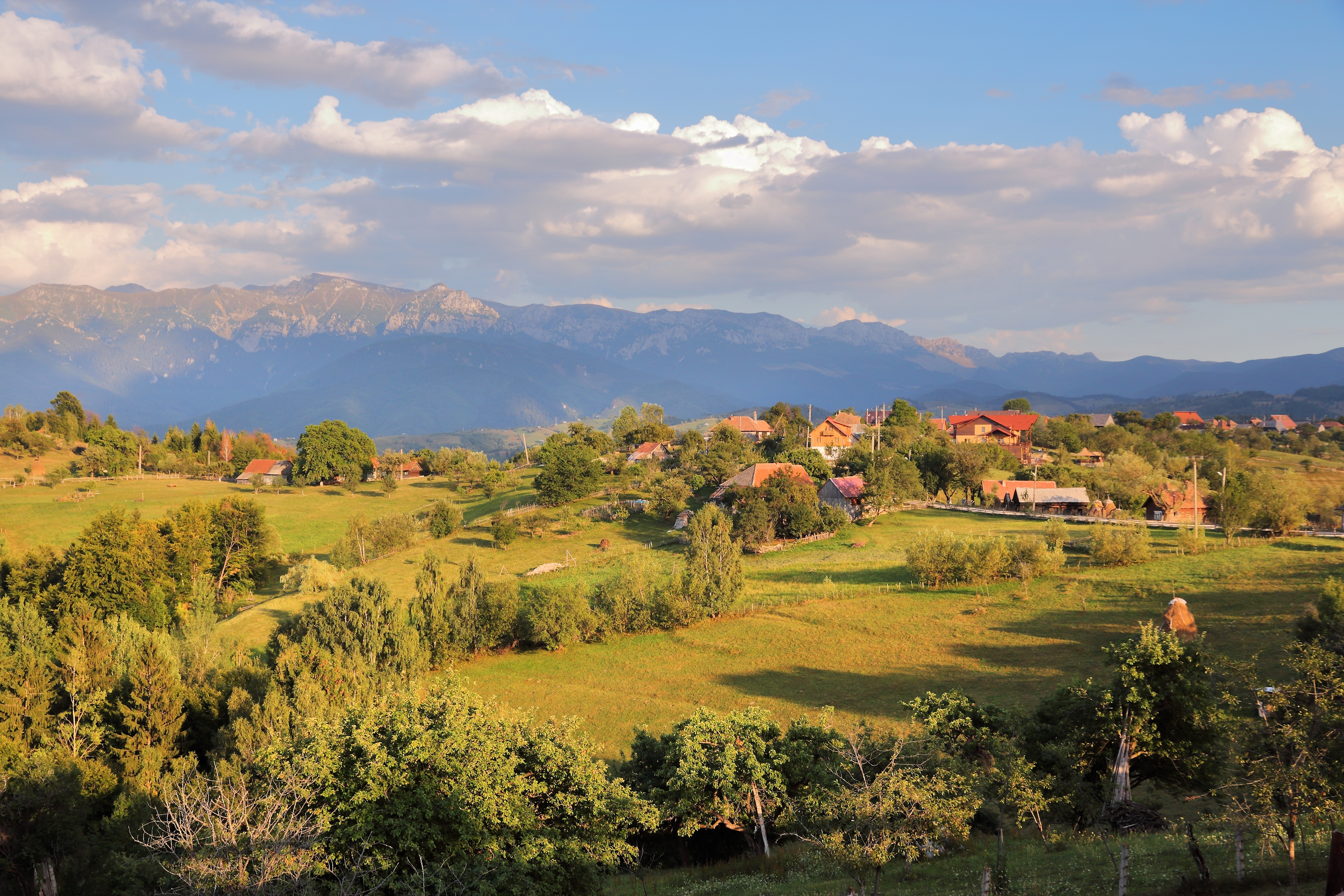
Piatra Craiului Mountains

Brașov County contains some of the most attractive tourist destinations in Romania.

The main tourist attractions in the county are:

- The city of Brașov.
- Bran Castle also known as Dracula's Castle
- Poiana Brașov mountain resort.
- Predeal mountain resort.
- Bran with its castle often – inaccurately – referred to as Dracula's castle.
- The Făgăraș Mountains.
- Piatra Craiului Mountains.
- The medieval fortresses of Făgăraș and Râșnov.
- The Fortified churches from the Saxon villages in the Burzenland area.
- The Via Transilvanica long-distance hiking and biking trail, which crosses the county.

== Administration ==
The Brașov County Council, renewed at the 2024 Romanian local elections, consists of 34 councilors, with the following party composition:

Party	Seats	Current County Council
National Liberal Party (PNL)	11	
Social Democratic Party (PSD)	8	
Save Romania Union (USR)	6	
Alliance for the Union of Romanians (AUR)	4	
Democratic Union of Hungarians in Romania (UDMR)	3	
People's Movement Party (PMP)	2	

== Administrative divisions ==
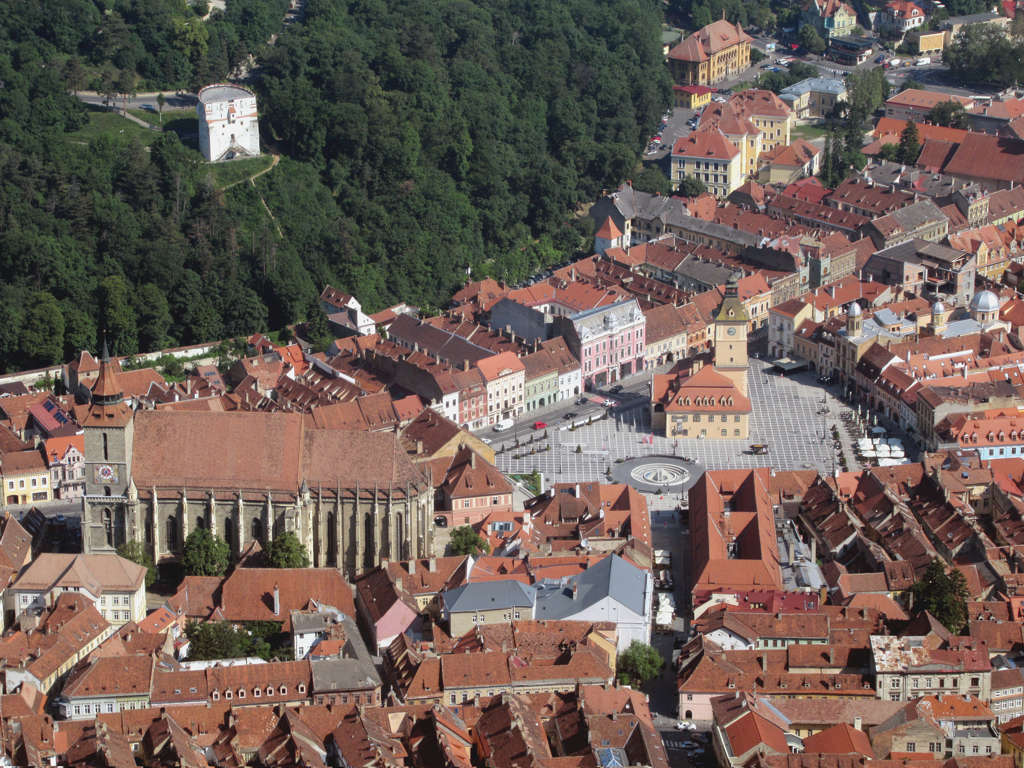
Brașov (German: Kronstadt)

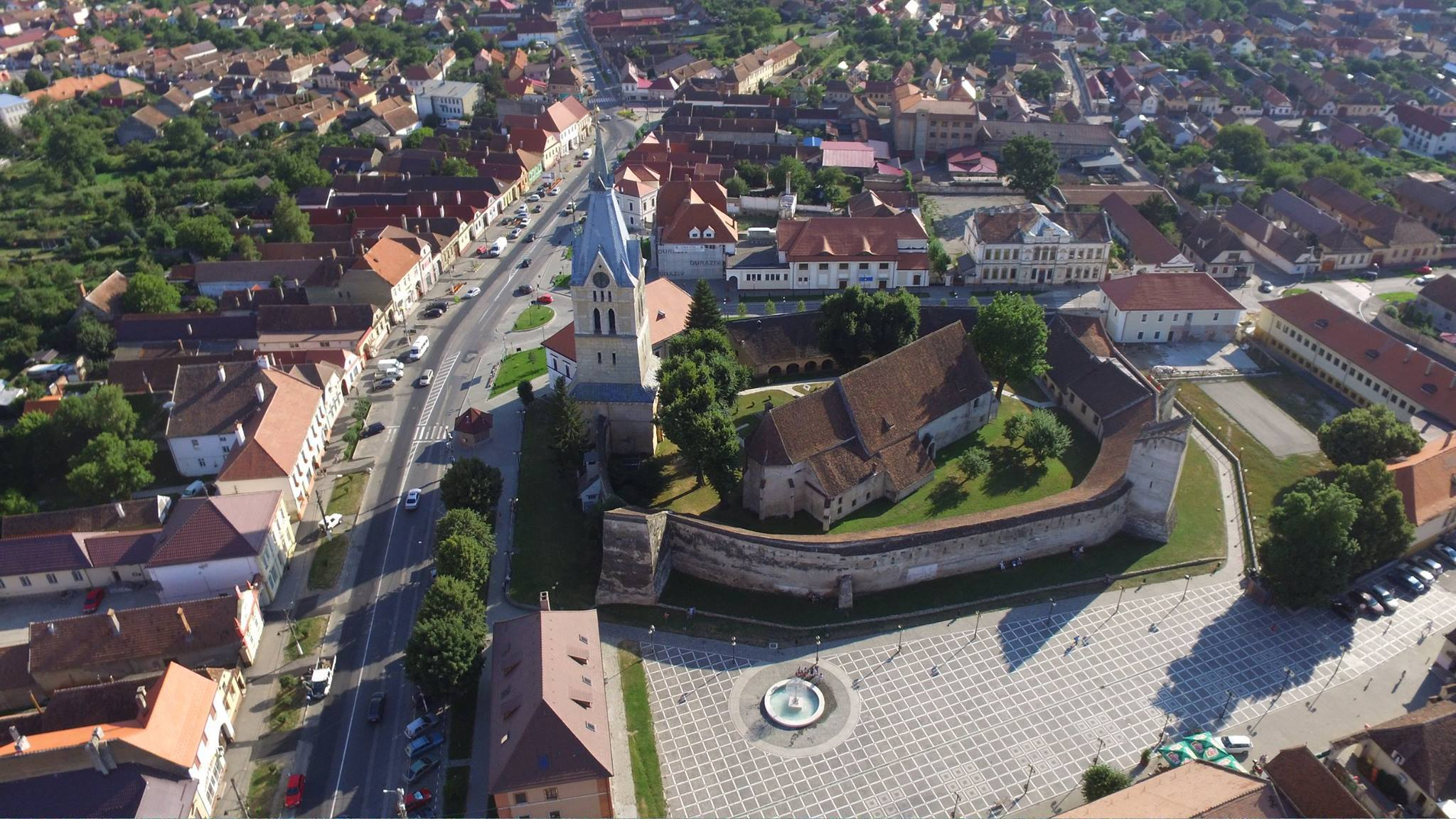
Codlea (German: Zeiden)

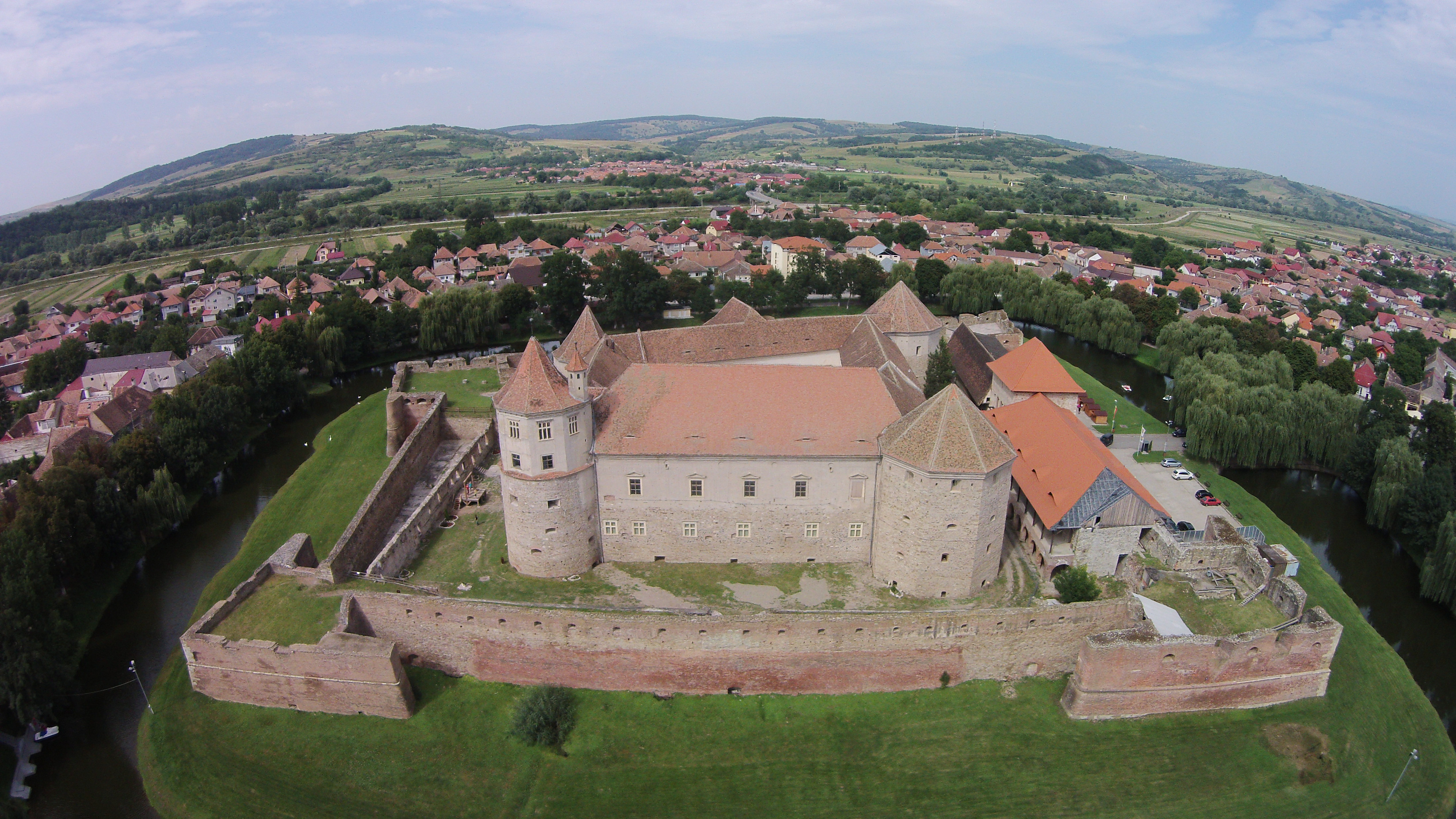
Făgăraș (German: Fogorasch)

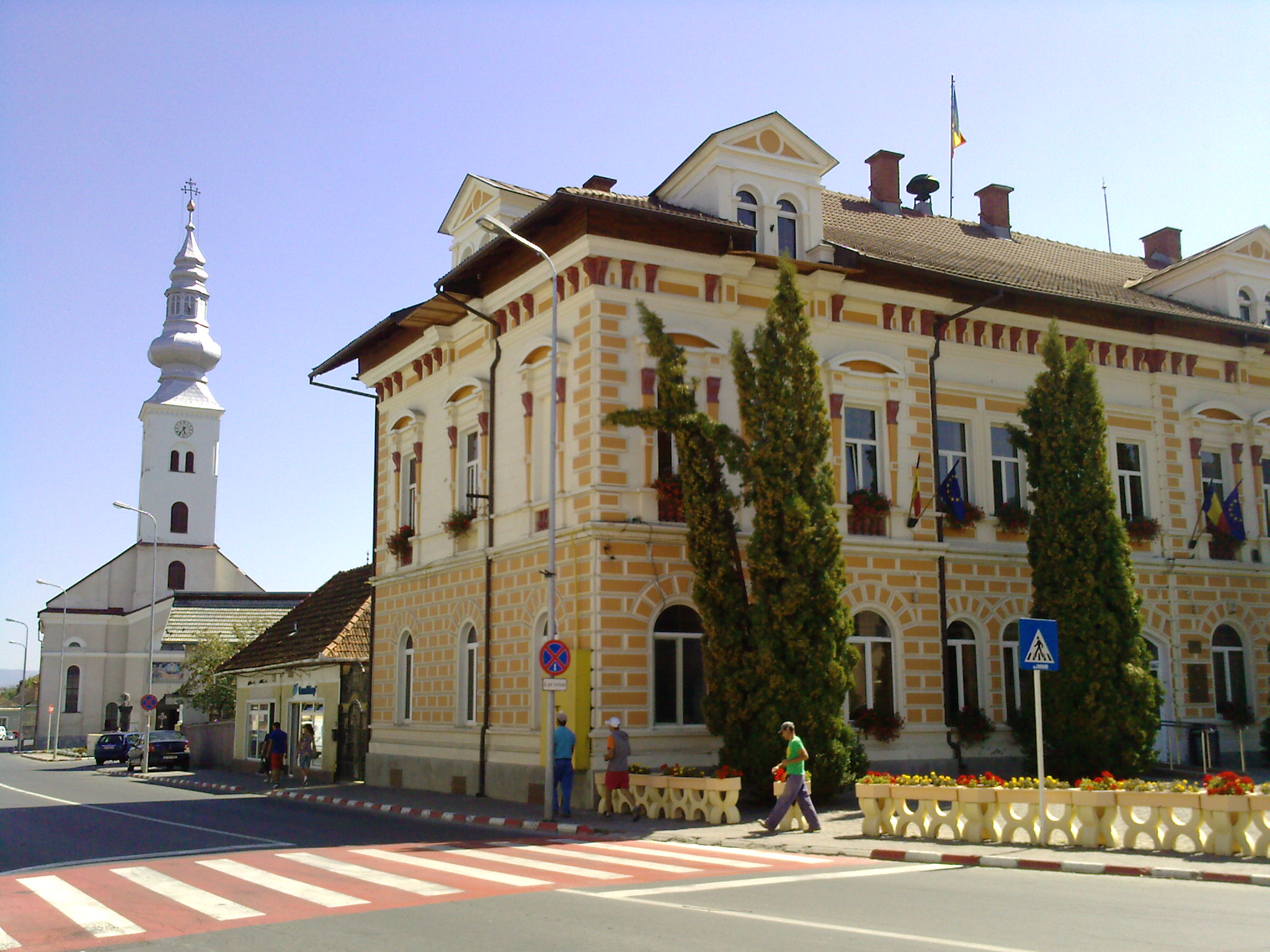
Săcele (German: Siebendörfer)

Brașov County has four municipalities, six towns and 48 communes:

- Municipalities
  - Brașov – county seat; 253,200 (as of 2011)
  - Codlea
  - Făgăraș
  - Săcele
- Towns
  - Ghimbav
  - Predeal
  - Râșnov
  - Rupea
  - Victoria
  - Zărnești
- Communes
  - Apața
  - Augustin
  - Beclean
  - Bod
  - Bran
  - Budila
  - Bunești
  - Cața
  - Cincu
  - Comăna
  - Cristian
  - Crizbav
  - Drăguș
  - Dumbrăvița
  - Feldioara
  - Fundata
  - Hălchiu
  - Hărman
  - Hârseni
  - Hoghiz
  - Holbav
  - Homorod
  - Jibert
  - Lisa
  - Mândra
  - Măieruș
  - Moieciu
  - Ormeniș
  - Părău
  - Poiana Mărului
  - Prejmer
  - Racoș
  - Recea
  - Șercaia
  - Șinca
  - Șinca Nouă
  - Sâmbăta de Sus
  - Sânpetru
  - Șoarș
  - Tărlungeni
  - Teliu
  - Ticușu
  - Ucea
  - Ungra
  - Vama Buzăului
  - Viștea
  - Voila
  - Vulcan

== Historical county ==
Județul Brașov
- County (Județ)
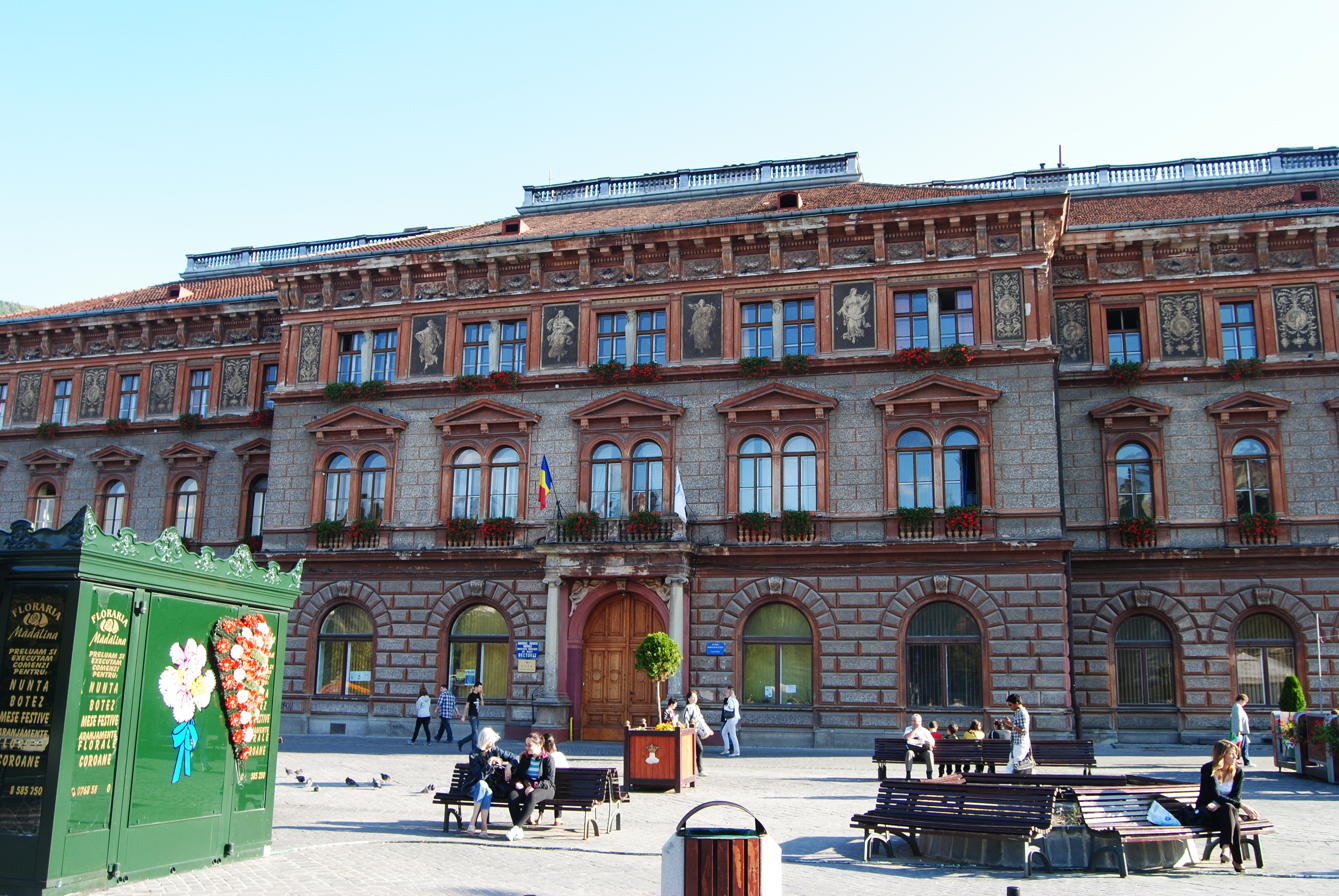
- The Brașov County Prefecture building of the interwar period, currently the rectory of Transilvania University of Brașov.

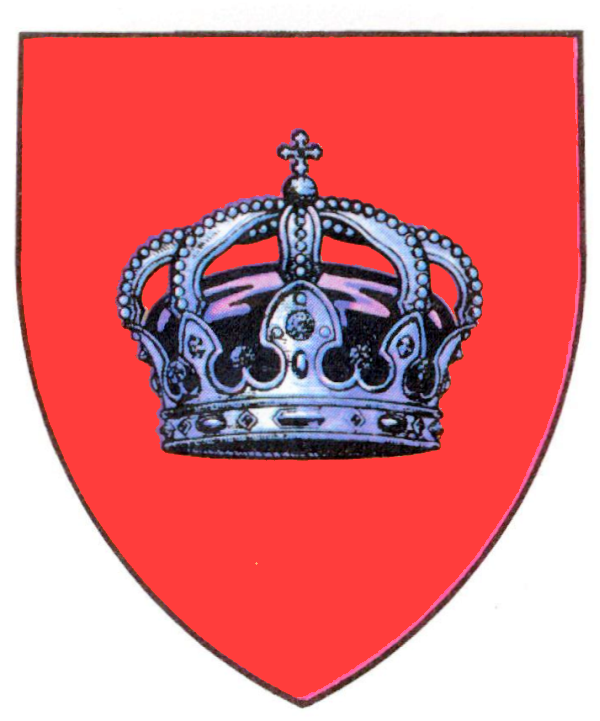
- Coat of arms

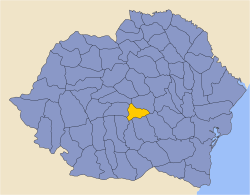
- Country: Romania
- Historic region: Transylvania
- Capital city (Reședință de județ): Brașov
- Established: 1925

Area
  - Total: 2,605 km^{2} (1,006 sq mi)

Population (1930)
  - Total: 167,946
  - Density: 64.47/km^{2} (167.0/sq mi)
- Time zone: UTC+2 (EET)
  - Summer (DST): UTC+3 (EEST)

Historically, the county was located in the central part of Greater Romania, in the southeastern part of Transylvania. Its capital was Brașov. Its territory included the part of the old region of Țara Bârsei. The county's territory was enlarged as a result of the administrative reform of 1925. Its territory covered the eastern part of today's Braşov County and the south of today's Covasna County.

It was bordered on the west by the counties of Făgăraș and Muscel, to the north by Trei Scaune County, to the east by Buzău County, and to the south by the counties of Prahova and Dâmbovița.

=== History ===
Prior to World War I, the territory of the county belonged to Austria-Hungary and was identical with the Brassó County of the Kingdom of Hungary. After the Hungarian–Romanian War of 1918–1919, the territory of Brașov County came under the administration of the Kingdom of Romania; it was formally transferred to Romania from Hungary as the successor state to Austria-Hungary in 1920 under the Treaty of Trianon.

In 1938, King Carol II promulgated a new Constitution, and subsequently, he had the administrative division of the Romanian territory changed. 10 ținuturi (approximate translation: "lands") were created (by merging the counties) to be ruled by rezidenți regali (approximate translation: "Royal Residents") - appointed directly by the King - instead of the prefects. Brașov County became part of Ținutul Argeș.

In 1940, part of the county was transferred back to Hungary with the rest of Northern Transylvania under the Second Vienna Award. In September 1944, Romanian forces with Soviet assistance recaptured the ceded territory and reintegrated it into Romania. Romanian jurisdiction over the entire county per the Treaty of Trianon was reaffirmed in the Paris Peace Treaties, 1947. The county was disestablished by the communist government of Romania in 1950, when it was incorporated in the larger Stalin Region, renamed Brașov Region in 1960. Brașov County was re-established in 1968 when Romania restored the county administrative system.

=== Administration ===
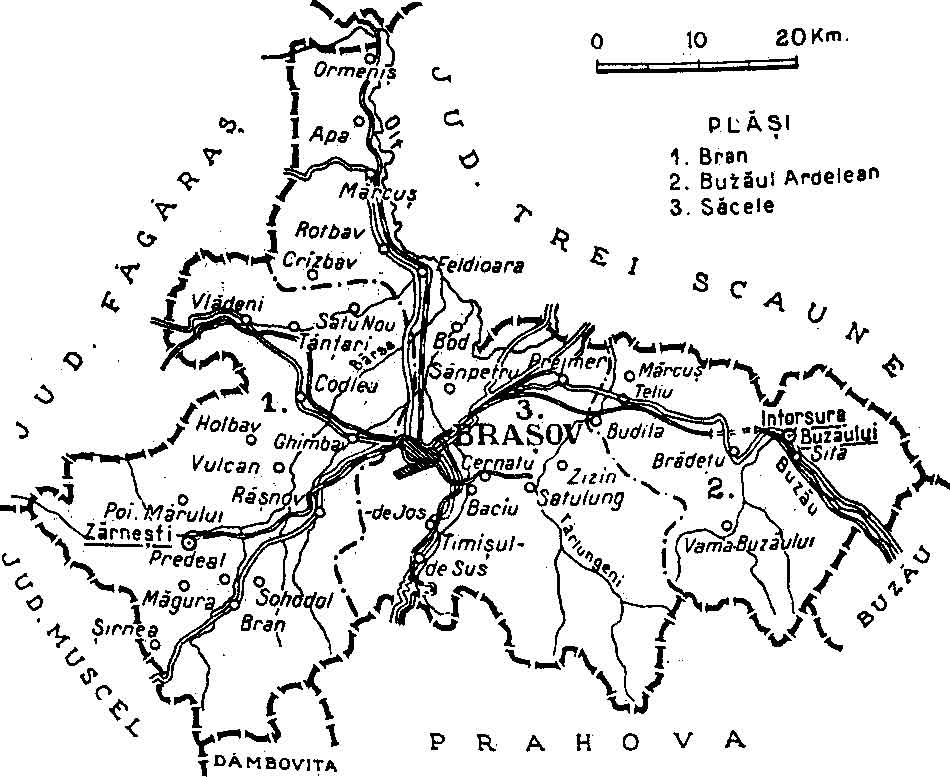
Map of Brașov County as constituted in 1938.

Until the administrative reform of 1925, Brașov County was divided into three administrative districts (plăși), 23 rural communes, and one urban commune (Brașov).

After 1925, the area of the county was similarly divided into three districts:

1. Plasa Bran, headquartered at Bran.
2. Plasa Buzăul Ardelean, headquartered at Întorsura Buzăului.
3. Plasa Săcele (previously named Plasa Brașov), headquartered at Prejmer.

Plasa Bran included the following settlements: Bran, Codlea, Cristian, Fundata, Ghimbav, Hălchiu, Holbav, Măgura, Moieciul de Jos, Moieciul de Sus, Peștera, Poiana Mărului, Predeal, Râșnov, Satu Nou, Șimon, Sohodol, Șirnea, Tohanu Nou, Tohanu Vechi, Țânțari, Vlădeni, Vulcan, and Zărnești.

Plasa Buzăul Ardelean included the following settlements: Barcani, Budila, Dobârlău, Întorsura Buzăului, Mărcuș, Sărămaș, Sita Buzăului, Teliu, and Vama Buzăului.

Plasa Săcele included the following settlements: Apața, Baciu, Bod, Cernatu, Crizbav, Feldioara, Hărman, Măieruș, Prejmer, Purcăreni, Rotbav, Satulung, Sânpetru, Tărlungeni, Turcheș, and Zizin.

=== Economy ===
As a mountain county, agriculture was poorly developed in Brașov. Much of the county's agricultural land was devoted to potatoes, and orchards were planted in hilly areas. Livestock breeding (predominantly cattle and pigs) was an important activity.

Such industry as there was in the county was concentrated in the city of Brașov. In 1925, it had production centers in the chemical, metallurgical, construction, food, textile, machine, pharmaceutical and light industries. Surrounding areas excelled in the metallurgy, extractive, construction, food, textile, and light industries. The city of Brașov was also the main outlet of the county for local products.

Among the natural richness of the county were Zizin's mineral waters, containing sodium bicarbonate, iron, iodine, and carbonic acid. Lignite was exploited at Prejmer, and bituminous coal at Vulcan and Cristian.

=== Education ===
In 1925, there was a state high school (lyceum) for boys and another one for girls, four religious high schools for boys, a gymnasium, six secondary schools, four commercial schools, a normal school for educators, a school of arts and crafts and a school of state for commercial and industrial apprentices. The number of state primary schools was 19 and the religious was 53 (of which, in the Romanian language: 17 Orthodox and 3 Roman Catholic; in the German language: 2 Roman Catholic and 18 Lutheran; in the Hungarian language: 2 Reformed and 10 Lutheran; and one Jewish school)

=== Population ===
The census of 1920 reported 101,953 inhabitants (about 68/km^{2} (180/sq mi)), of which 36,138 were ethnic Romanians, 33,584 Hungarians, 30,281 Germans, 1,560 Jews, and 390 of other nationalities.

According to the census data of 1930, the county's population was 168,125, of which 49.9% were Romanians, 26.6% Hungarians, 19.8% Germans, as well as other minorities. In the religious aspect, the population consisted of 48.8% Eastern Orthodox, 27.8% Lutheran, 9.9% Roman Catholic, 6% Reformed, 2.4% Greek Catholic, 1.7% Jewish, as well as other minorities.

==== Urban population ====
In 1930, the urban population of the county was 59,232, of which 39.3% were Hungarians, 32.7% Romanians, 22.0% Germans, 3.8% Jews, as well as other minorities. As a mother tongue in the urban population, Hungarian was 42.2%, followed by Romanian (32.7%), German (22.4%), Yiddish (0.9%) as well as other minorities. From the religious point of view, the urban population was made up of 30.0% Eastern Orthodox, 22.3% Roman Catholic, 22.0% Evangelical (Lutheran), 13.9% Reformed (Calvinist), 4.4% Jewish, 3.5% Greek Catholic, 3.2% Unitarian, as well as other minorities.
