= List of settlements in Brașov County =

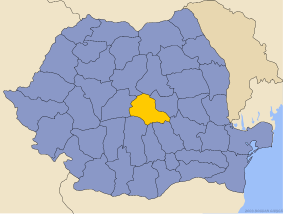
Brașov County in Romania

This is a list of settlements in Brașov County, Romania.

The following are the county's cities and towns, along with their attached villages:

City/Town	Villages
Brașov	
Codlea	
Făgăraș	
Săcele	
Ghimbav	
Predeal	Pârâul Rece, Timișu de Sus, Timișu de Jos
Râșnov	
Rupea	Fişer
Victoria	
Zărnești	Tohanu Nou

The following are the county's communes, with component villages:

Commune	Villages
Apața	Apața
Augustin	Augustin
Beclean	Beclean, Boholț, Calbor, Hurez, Luța
Bod	Bod, Colonia Bod
Bran	Bran, Poarta, Predeluț, Șimon, Sohodol
Budila	Budila
Bunești	Bunești, Criț, Meșendorf, Roadeș, Viscri
Cața	Beia, Cața, Drăușeni, Ionești, Paloș
Cincu	Cincu, Toarcla
Comăna	Comăna de Jos, Comăna de Sus, Crihalma, Ticușu Nou
Cristian	Cristian
Crizbav	Crizbav, Cutuș
Drăguș	Drăguș
Dumbrăvița	Dumbrăvița, Vlădeni
Feldioara	Colonia Reconstrucția, Feldioara, Rotbav
Fundata	Fundata, Fundățica, Șirnea
Hălchiu	Hălchiu, Satu Nou
Hărman	Hărman, Podu Oltului
Hârseni	Copăcel, Hârseni, Măliniș, Mărgineni, Sebeș
Hoghiz	Bogata Olteană, Cuciulata, Dopca, Fântâna, Hoghiz, Lupșa
Holbav	Holbav
Homorod	Homorod, Jimbor, Mercheașa
Jibert	Dacia, Grânari, Jibert, Lovnic, Văleni
Lisa	Breaza, Lisa, Pojorta
Mândra	Ileni, Mândra, Râușor, Șona, Toderița
Măieruș	Arini, Măieruș
Moieciu	Cheia, Drumul Carului, Măgura, Moieciu de Jos, Moieciu de Sus, Peștera
Ormeniș	Ormeniș
Părău	Grid, Părău, Veneția de Jos, Veneția de Sus
Poiana Mărului	Poiana Mărului
Prejmer	Lunca Câlnicului, Prejmer, Stupinii Prejmerului
Racoș	Racoș, Mateiaș
Recea	Berivoi, Dejani, Recea, Săsciori, Iași, Săvăstreni, Gura Văii
Sâmbăta de Sus	Sâmbăta de Sus, Stațiunea Climaterică Sâmbăta
Sânpetru	Sânpetru
Șercaia	Hălmeag, Șercaia, Vad
Șinca	Bucium, Ohaba, Perșani, Șercăița, Șinca Veche, Vâlcea
Șinca Nouă	Paltin, Șinca Nouă
Șoarș	Bărcuț, Felmer, Rodbav, Seliștat, Șoarș
Tărlungeni	Cărpiniș, Purcăreni, Tărlungeni, Zizin
Teliu	Teliu
Ticușu	Cobor, Ticușu Vechi
Ucea	Corbi, Feldioara, Ucea de Jos, Ucea de Sus
Ungra	Dăișoara, Ungra
Vama Buzăului	Acriș, Buzăiel, Dălghiu, Vama Buzăului
Viștea	Olteț, Rucăr, Viștea de Jos, Viștea de Sus, Viștișoara
Voila	Cincșor, Dridif, Ludișor, Sâmbăta de Jos, Voila, Voivodeni
Vulcan	Colonia 1 Mai, Vulcan
