= Via Transilvanica =

Hiking trail in Romania

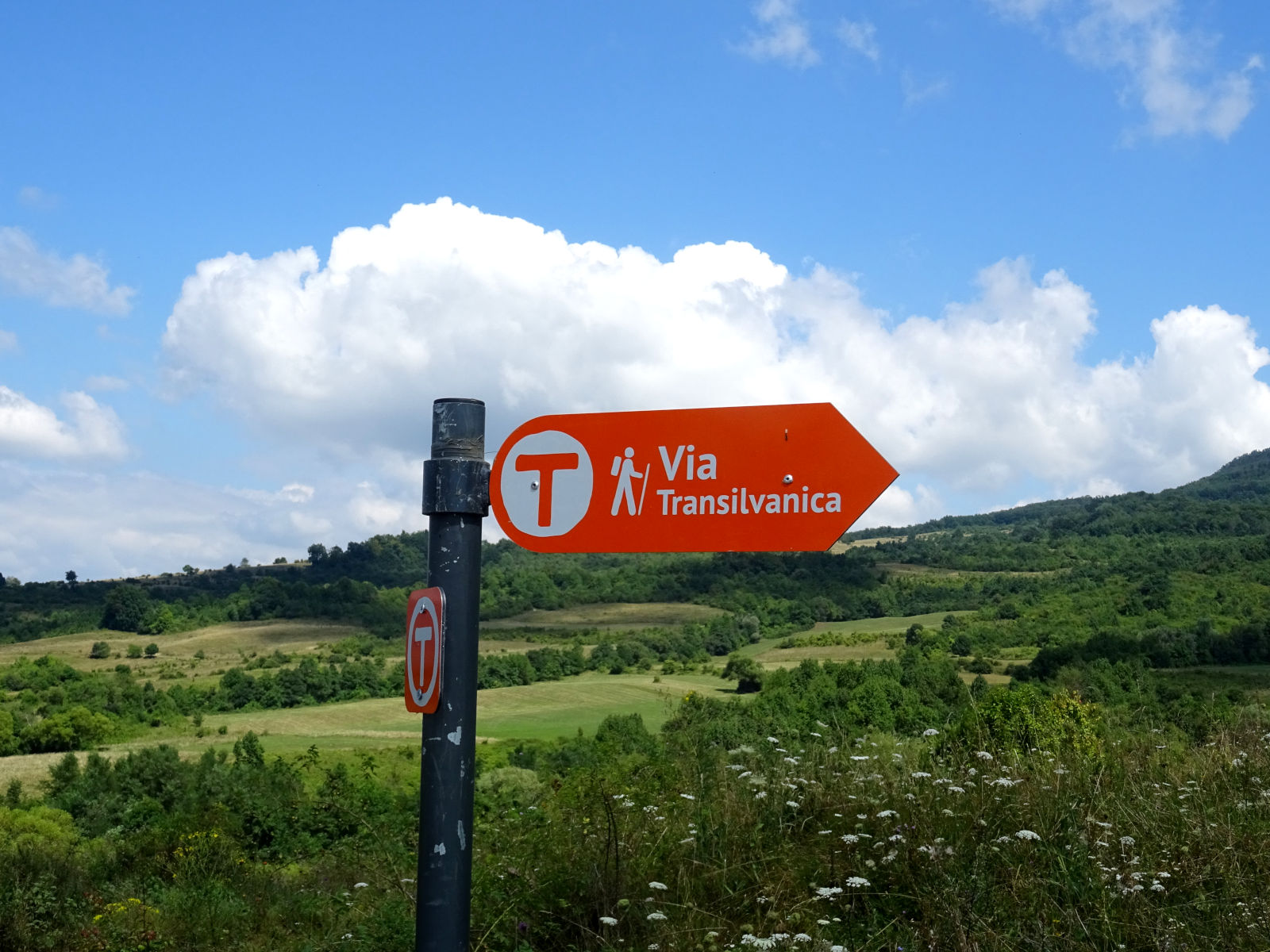
- Motto: "The Road that Unites"
- Length: 1,428 km (887 mi)
- Location: Romania
- Began construction: 2018
- Completed: 2022
- Highest point: 1,300 m (4,300 ft)

Via Transilvanica 'The Transylvanian Trail' is a hiking trail that crosses the Transylvania, Bukovina and Banat regions of Romania, and is meant to promote their cultural, ethnic, historical and natural diversity. It was built between 2018 and 2022, with its design and conception heavily inspired by historical pilgrims' ways and hiking trails, such as The Way of St. James and The Appalachian Trail. Starting at Putna, Suceava County, it stretches over 1,428 kilometres (887 miles), 10 counties of Romania, over 400 communities, and 8 UNESCO World Heritage sites, ending in Drobeta-Turnu Severin, Mehedinți County. Its motto is "The road that unites".

== History ==
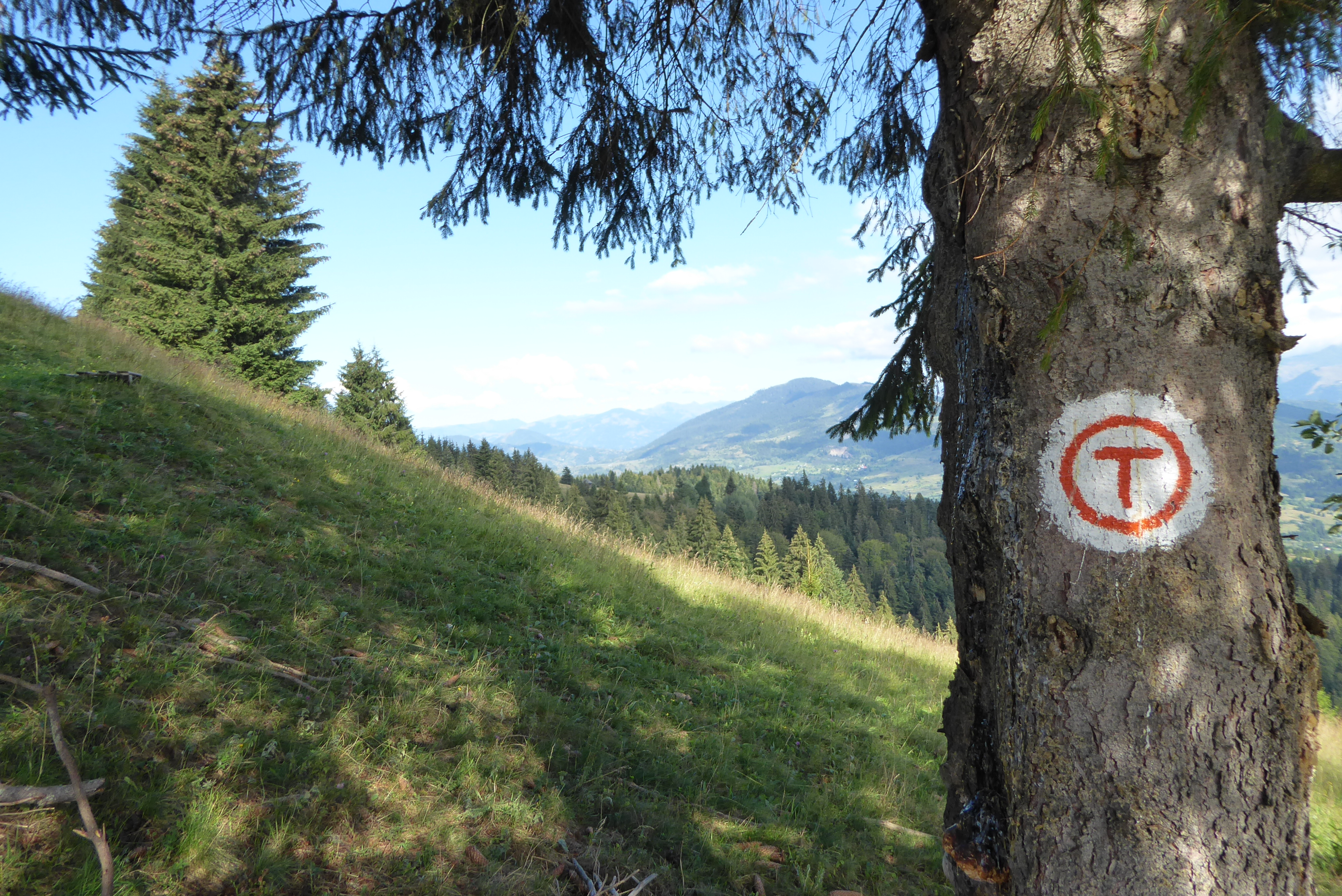
Painted marking

The trail was envisioned by the non-governmental organisation Tășuleasa Social, based in Bistrița-Năsăud County. The way marking of trail was done in five major stages between the years 2018 and 2022:

- In 2018, the first 134 km (83 mi) of trail was marked in Bistrița-Năsăud county.
- In 2019, 137 km (85 mi) of trail was marked in Suceava County and 98 km (61 mi) in Mehedinți County.
- In 2020, the trail sections in the counties of Mureș, Harghita, Brașov, and Sibiu were completed, bringing the total length of marked path to approximately 800 km (500 mi).
- In 2021, the approximately 250 km (160 mi) of trail through Caraș-Severin County were fully marked, bringing the total marked up to 1,077 km (669 mi).
- In 2022, on October 8, an inauguration ceremony is held in Alba Iulia after the last 150 km of markings in the counties of Hunedoara and Alba are completed.
- In spring 2025 a side track in Brașov county was marked. It connects Poiana Mărulu on the main path with Brașov town and Viscri (Deutsch-Weißkirch).

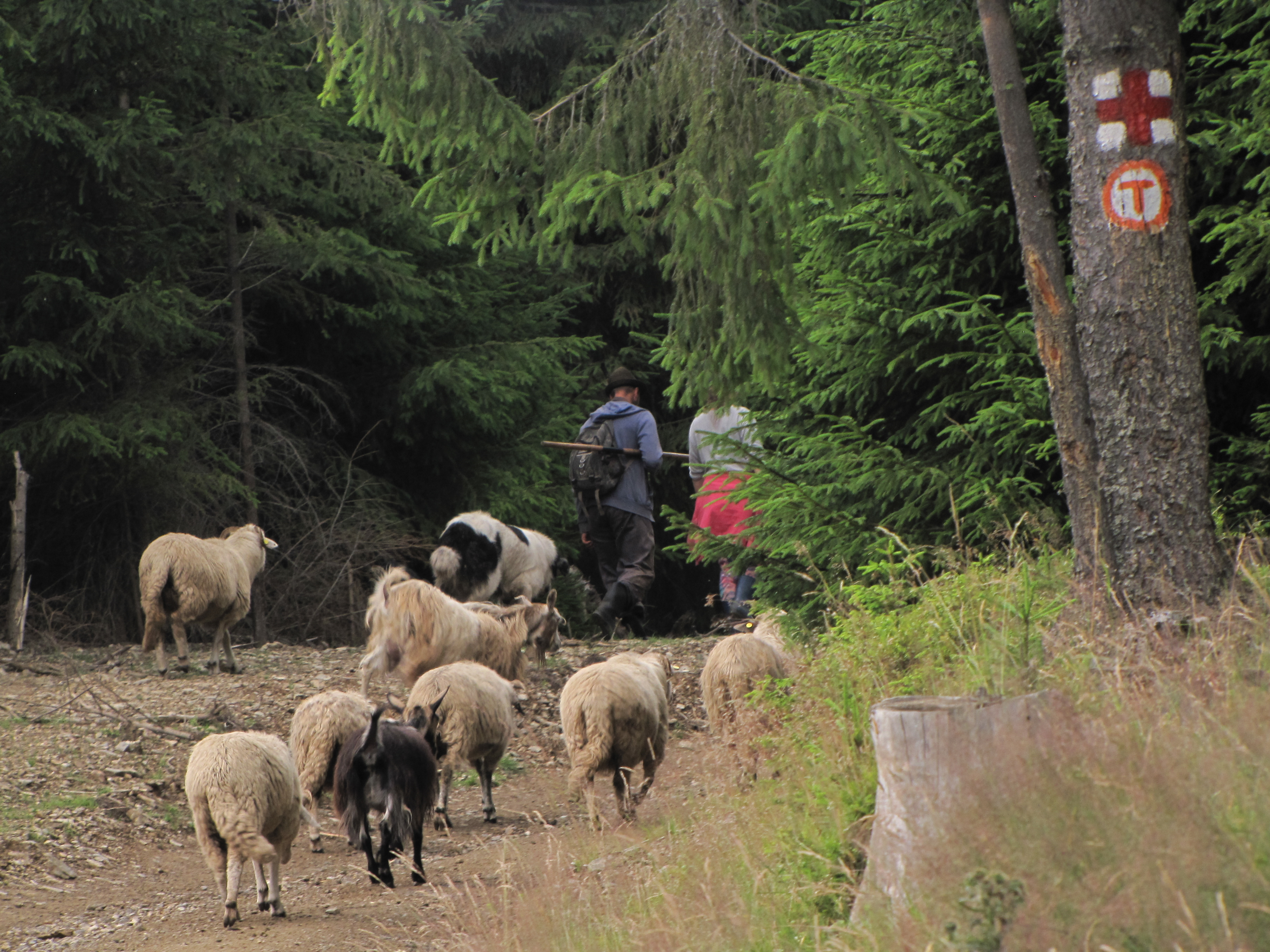
Via Transilvanica - Bucovina

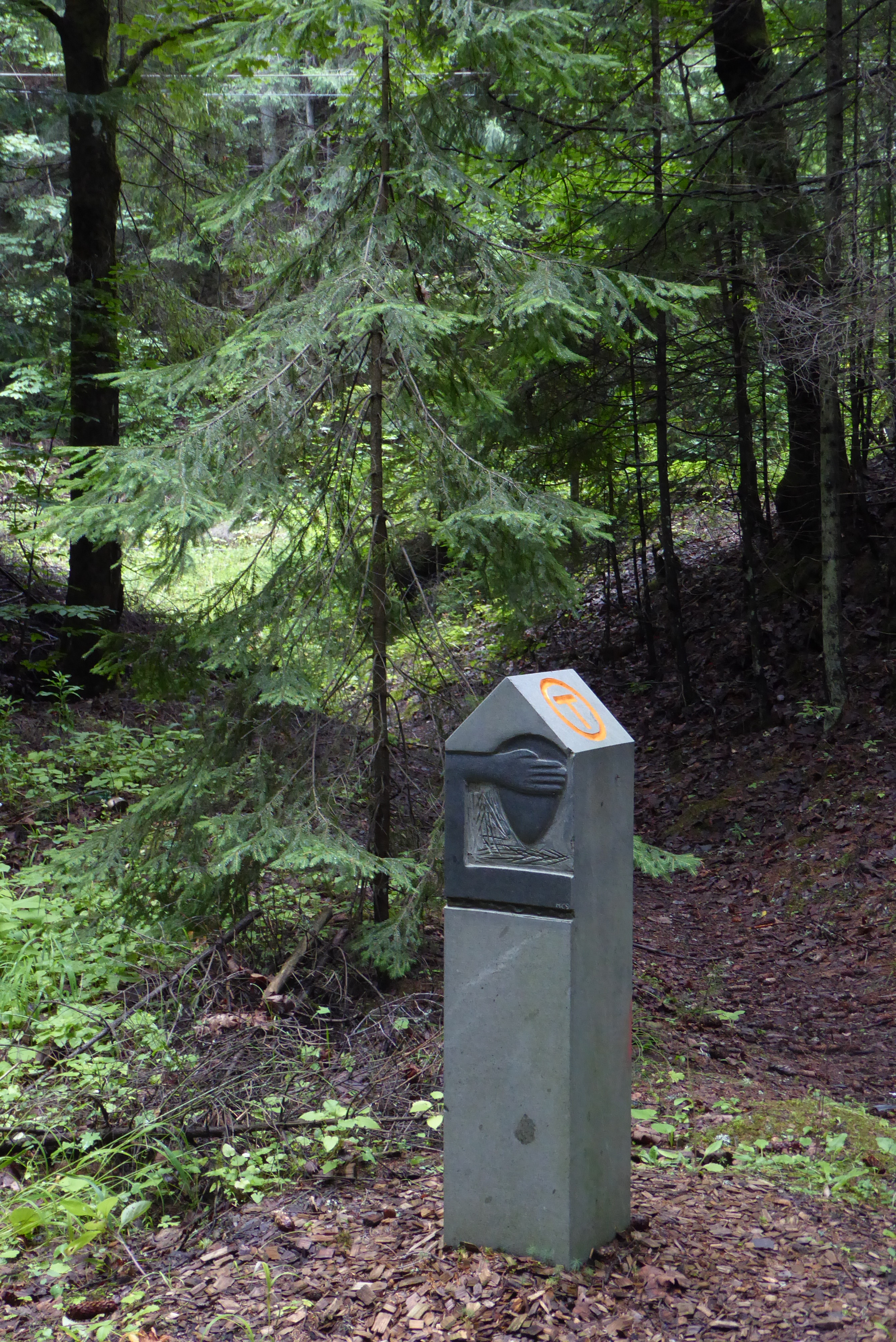
Typical Via Transilvanica milestone

In terms of funding, the marking of approximately 830 km (520 mi) of trail was funded through charitable donations, sponsorship deals, and other partnerships with various private companies. Some of the funding was thanks to a donation of profits from the sale of the book "27 steps" by Tiberiu Ușeriu, a Romanian ultramarathon runner and extreme sport athlete, one of the main ambassadors of the Via Transilvanica. The marking of the trail, including the laying of the over 1,000 andesite milestones came up to approximately 1.5 million Euros. Hundreds of volunteers took part in the marking and promotion of the route including actors Marcel Iureș and Pavel Bartoș, former prince Nicholas Medforth-Mills, journalists Andreea Esca and Andi Moisescu, activist Dragoș Bucurenci, tennis player Horia Tecău, TV presenter Charlie Ottley, and philosopher Mihaela Miroiu.

In 2023, it received the "Citizen Involvement and Awareness" award offered by Europa Nostra.

== Route ==
Via Transilvanica is divided into seven historical and cultural regions: Bucovina, the Highland, Terra Siculorum, Terra Saxonum, Terra Dacica, Terra Banatica and Terra Romana. The route spans ten of Romania's counties: Suceava, Bistrița-Năsăud, Mureș, Harghita, Brașov, Sibiu, Alba, Hunedoara, Caraș-Severin, and Mehedinți.

The trail blazing consists of either painted markings on trees and stones, or handcrafted andesite milestones, each with a unique design and weighing approximately 260 kg (570 lb) each, position roughly one kilometer apart. The painted markings always come in the same two colors, orange and white, with the orange arrows pointing south-west, towards Drobeta-Turnu Severin, and the white arrows pointing north-east in the direction of Putna. There are also painted markings of an orange "T" on a white background.

Route
#	Original name	English name	Towns and tourist attractions	Length
1	Bucovina	Bukovina	Putna, Sucevița, Vatra Moldoviței, Churches of Moldavia, Vatra Dornei, Poiana Stampei	136 km
2	Ținutul de Sus	The Highlands	Poiana Stampei, Tihuța Pass, Bistrița	277 km
3	Terra Siculorum	The Székely Land	Câmpu Cetății, Sovata, Praid, Archita	157 km
4	Terra Saxonum	The Saxon Land	Sighișoara, Mediaș, Bazna, Micăsasa	201 km
5	Terra Dacica	The Dacian Land	Blaj, Alba Iulia, Sarmizegetusa Regia, Ulpia Traiana Sarmizegetusa	290 km
6	Terra Banatica	Banat	Bucova, Caransebeș, Reșița, Prigor, Domogled-Valea Cernei National Park	232 km
7	Terra Romana	The Roman Land	Domogled-Valea Cernei National Park, Drobeta-Turnu Severin	135 km

== Extension of the Via Transilvanica Trail ==
=== Terra Borza Teutonica ===
The Tășuleasa Social Association wants to extend Via Transilvanica through all the historical regions of the country, according to a 20-year plan. The new segment, called Terra Borza Teutonica / Țara Bârsei Teutonica, stretches through Brașov County and is 172 kilometers long. Work began in Viscri on March 28, 2025, when the first andesite kilometer marker was installed on the new segment. This new segment connects the localities of Viscri, Bunești, Jibert, Șoarș, Ticușu, Mândra, Șercaia, Șinca, Șinca Nouă, Poiana Mărului, Zărnești, Moieciu, Bran, Râșnov and Brașov.

Actress and director Dana Rogoz was appointed ambassador for this section.

The new route was inaugurated on June 5, 2025.

== See also ==
- Camino de Santiago
- European long-distance paths
- Appalachian Trail
- Pacific Crest Trail
