= Ticuș =

- Location within Romania

Location
- Country: Romania
- Counties: Brașov County
- Villages: Cobor, Ticușu Vechi, Ticușu Nou

Physical characteristics
- Mouth: Olt
  - coordinates: 45.9070°N 25.1956°E
- Length: 19 km (12 mi)
- Basin size: 75 km^{2} (29 sq mi)

Basin features
- Progression: Olt→ Danube→ Black Sea

The Ticuș is a right tributary of the river Olt in Romania. It discharges into the Olt in Ticușu Nou. Its length is 19 km (12 mi) and its basin size is 75 km^{2} (29 sq mi).
