= Valea Comorilor River =

Valea Comorilor River may refer to:

- Valea Comorilor, a tributary of the Părău in Brașov County, Romania
- Valea Comorilor, a tributary of the Valea Cerbului in Prahova County, Romania
