= Vâlcea (disambiguation) =

Vâlcea may refer to several places in Romania:

- Vâlcea County
- Vâlcea, a village in Bucium Commune, Alba County
- Vâlcea, a village in Șinca Commune, Brașov County
