= Augustin Bunea =

Romanian theologian and historian (1857–1909)

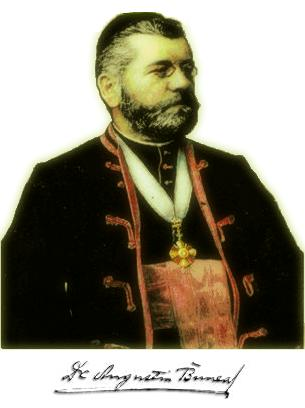
- Born: August 4, 1857; Șercaia, Brașov County, Romania
- Died: November 30, 1909 (aged 52); Blaj, Austria-Hungary
- Citizenship: Austria-Hungary
- Education: "Ștefan Manciulea" Technological High School from Blaj; Pontificio Collegio Urbano de Propaganda Fide; Pontifical Urban University
- Occupations: Historian, theology, Greek Catholic Church
- Parents: Arsenie Bunea (father); Veronica Urs (mother)

Augustin Bunea (August 4, 1857–November 30, 1909) was an Austro-Hungarian ethnic Romanian historian and priest within the Romanian Greek-Catholic Church.

== Biography ==
=== Origins and role in Blaj ===
Bunea was born in Vad, a village in the Țara Făgărașului region of Transylvania, then part of the Austrian Empire. He attended primary school from 1864 to 1870, there and in nearby Ohaba. He went to a gymnasium in Brașov until the spring of 1877, when he was briefly transferred to Blaj. While in Brașov, he and classmate Andrei Bârseanu edited a magazine by hand; it was called Conversațiuni. Jurnal literar. In the magazine, Bunea published 97 folk poems he had gathered around his native village, accompanied by commentaries that showed familiarity with the relevant literature. In autumn 1877, he began studying philosophy and theology on scholarship at Rome's Pontifical Urban University. Ordained a priest in 1881, he obtained a doctorate in theology the following year.

After returning to Blaj, the spiritual center of his church, Bunea was assigned to a number of posts within the hierarchy, from metropolitan's adviser and secretary under Ioan Vancea to scholastic and custodial canon under Victor Mihaly de Apșa. He was involved in organizing confessional education at Blaj and across the Făgăraș and Alba Iulia Archdiocese. At Blaj, he taught religion and dogmatic theology within both the gymnasium and the seminar, briefly serving as prefect of studies. From 1900 to 1903, he was archdiocesan commissioner for the examinations given by certain church schools in Blaj. He was a founding member of the Greek-Catholic teachers' association, and served as inspector for the archdiocese's village schools.

=== Journalism and recognition ===
Over the course of his career, Bunea contributed to several Romanian-language publications, particularly in his native province. His articles dealt with literature, politics and history, appearing in Foaia bisericească și scolastică (Blaj), Tribuna and Transilvania (Sibiu), Gazeta Transilvaniei (Brașov) and in the periodical Dreptatea (Timișoara). In 1890, he helped establish Unirea newspaper in Blaj. In 1903, he published a selection of the texts he had submitted to this organ as Discursuri. Autonomia bisericească. Diverse.

Bunea became a member of Astra in 1886. In September 1900, he was elected a corresponding member of its historical section. He was among the collaborators on the organization's Enciclopedia română project, signing around fifty articles that covered some sixty pages. These mainly dealt with important figures in the church's past, but also touched on internal administration, the history of Blaj and Romanian monasteries in Transylvania. The author later drew on the articles for other historiographical works.

Nicolae Iorga, Ioan Bianu and Dimitrie Onciul all appreciated Bunea's merits as a historian, and he was distinguished by cultural organizations both in the Empire and in the Old Kingdom. Following his 1900 advancement within Astra, in March 1901, the Romanian Academy received him with the status of corresponding member. Several months later, he was made a member of Astra's central committee. In 1903, he became a paid member of the Hungarian Historical Society. In May 1909, he advanced to titular membership of the Romanian Academy.

=== Politics and death ===
Beginning in 1890, Bunea participated in the political movement of Transylvania's Romanians. A distinguished orator, he was among those who defended the Transylvanian Memorandum signatories. For many years, he belonged to the Romanian National Party. In his will, drafted in early 1906, Bunea provided for the possibility that his money might be used to set up a foundation for Greek-Catholic youth. The foundation would be administered by the Blaj consistory and would be used to send promising graduates to further their studies abroad.

Bunea died at Blaj in late 1909. His fellow priests at the theological seminary dedicated an album to him; this featured private messages and newspaper articles from the cities and villages of Transylvania, from Romania, from Vienna, Budapest and other European cities. The album dedicated a lengthy section to the numerous articles in the Romanian press covering the event.

=== Legacy ===
During Bunea's lifetime, biographical data about him appeared in the 1898 first volume of Enciclopedia României and in three other sources, from 1899, 1900 and 1908. An article commemorating 30 years since his death appeared in the Cluj-based Tribuna in 1939. In 1940 and 1941, texts about him appeared in the book Dascălii Blajului, in Convorbiri Literare and in the Blaj high school yearbook. Subsequently, under the early years of the communist regime which banned the church, Romanian historiography fell silent about him.

In 1967, a detailed study appeared in Revista de etnografie și folclor; this dealt with the youthful Bunea's collecting of popular poetry in Țara Făgărașului. In 1970, a methodical study appeared in Pompiliu Teodor's Evoluția gândirii esoteric românești. This included biographical data, identified the roots of his activity as a historian and defined his areas of interest, main historiographic achievements and concept of history. Teodor also made judgments about the documentation used by Bunea. The 1978 Enciclopedia istoriografiei românești devoted a short entry to him. In 1991, following the Romanian Revolution, Liviu Maior dedicated an article in Tribuna to Bunea's political activity. A 1994 article deals with his contributions to Romanian cultural history in Transylvania as encapsulated in some of his works and in several articles from Unirea. During the 1990s, three articles, including one by Gabriel Ștrempel, brought to light previously unpublished material from his letters.

== Work ==
=== Early efforts ===
Bunea's early interest as a historian lay mainly with the history of the Romanian Greek-Catholic Church. His first book, a short volume from 1890, deals with the church's present condition. First appearing in Foaia bisericească și scolastică, and then as a 40-page brochure, it includes biographical information about incumbent metropolitan Vancea, as well as cataloguing his cultural, administrative and philanthropic activity. Bunea's 1893 work Cestiuni din dreptul și istoria Bisericii Românești Unite. Partea a II-a also deals with a contemporary issue. The author argued in defense of the church's autonomy, which was being threatened by the policies of the Hungarian government.

In 1900, Bunea published two books: Istoria scurtă a Bisericii Române Unite, a brief history of the church; and an important monograph about Inocențiu Micu-Klein. The first, written on the 200th anniversary of the union with Rome, began with an overview of relations between Romanians and the Holy See from the 2nd to the 15th centuries, going on to discuss Transylvania's Romanian church under the Calvinist princes. He then described the union itself and the life and activity of the early bishops in each diocese, ending with the present day. Bunea's sources were either published Latin and Romanian books or documents he researched in the metropolitan archive at Blaj. It is possible that the work inspired Zenovie Pâclișanu, whose later history of the church features a similar structure.

His study of Micu-Klein, which also touched on Petru Pavel Aron and Dionisije Novaković, delved into the problems of the 18th century's first half, reconstructing the facts based on numerous sources collected from Transylvanian and foreign archives. It appears that Bunea began preparation as early as 1894, when he received several copies of documents from the Vienna imperial court's archive. The book demonstrates thorough research on the social, political and cultural history of the Romanians in that era. Later exegeses by Pâclișanu, I. Tóth Zoltán and David Prodan used it as a basis for further research into contemporary Romanian life in Transylvania.

=== Church historian and polemicist ===
The 1902 Istoria românilor transilvăneni de la 1751 până la 1764 is similarly ample in depth. The preface speaks of the author's purpose: to advance the community's national development and to present his own concept of history. It deals with the figure of Aron; the question of Romanian religious movements, which is allocated considerable space; the organization of his church and of the Romanian Orthodox Church; the founding and development of Blaj's schools; the history of Transylvanian monasteries; the evolution of printing among the province's Romanians; and the political, economic and social situation of the peasantry. He pinpoints two important processes that took place in the history of Transylvanian Romanians during the period analyzed: their confessional disunity and the founding of the Blaj schools. While he opined that the first was in the interests of their neighboring political adversaries, he saw the second as elevating Micu-Klein above all other Romanians of the period. The book is based mainly on unpublished documents gathered from institutional archives in Blaj, Sibiu, Făgăraș, Vienna, Budapest and Rome, as well as from a few private individuals in Transylvania and the Romanian Old Kingdom. Some 250 documents were reproduced in the footnotes and appendices. He also used texts published by Timotei Cipariu, Iorga and Sterie Stinghe. During the interwar period, the topics broached by Bunea were taken up by the Cluj historical school.

Subsequently, Bunea became more interested in the history of the Orthodox Church in Transylvania, its origins, organizational and institutional evolution. A first work in this direction, published in 1902, was Vechile episcopii românesci a Vadului, Geoagiului, Silvașului și Bĕlgradului. The following year, he amplified and corrected certain conclusions in Istoria autonomiei bisericești, where he frequently cited Cipariu, George Bariț, Eudoxiu Hurmuzachi and Nikolaus Nilles. His next two books dealt with similar issues, and were written in response to polemics by contemporary Orthodox writers.

Ierarhia românilor din Ardeal și Ungaria (1904) is Bunea's reply to Teodor Păcățian's Istoriografi vechi, istoriografi noi. Studiu critic în chestia vechei mitropolii române. The latter work, a response to Vechile episcopii românesci, attempted to demonstrate the existence of a Romanian Orthodox metropolis in medieval Transylvania. Bunea, analyzing the church's institutional organization, reiterated that there was no documentary evidence of such an organization. The book displays a biting critique of Păcățian's way of writing history. It also elucidates his theory and approach to the practice: his knowledge of Latin, Hungarian and German allowed Bunea to use valuable historical information in order to complete what he found in Romanian sources, and to broaden his horizon when understanding the historical facts of the region. This made him an authority in debates on ecclesiastical history the western part of the Romanian-speaking lands. The second book, also a polemic, was the 1906 Mitropolitul Sava Brancovici. In his previous work, Bunea had already presented data about the life and activity of Sava Branković. The new text featured a detailed analysis of a book with the same title by Vasile Mangra and reached contrasting conclusions about Branković's place in church history. As with Păcățian, Bunea questioned Mangra's competence as a historian.

=== Late contributions ===
Bunea's final studies, which have to do with medieval Romanian history, were left incomplete at the time of his death. At the Romanian Academy's request, they were published posthumously as Stăpânii Țării Oltului, which he had prepared as his maiden speech to the Academy; and Încercare de istoria Românilor până la 1382. He chose to analyze the historic importance of Țara Oltului (another name for Țara Făgărașului) because of its role in the origins of the foundation of Wallachia and the consolidation of the Romanian element through longstanding ties with the latter region. The theme also had an emotional resonance: as Bianu inferred, it represented "the country of his parents and his birth". The work comprises a succinct political history of the area from the 9th through the 18th centuries, describing its status and leaders, specifying the political implications of leadership for each of them.

Beginning with the year 895, the author highlights the arrival of the Magyars in Pannonia and especially Transylvania; fixes the geographic limits of Țara Oltului; specifies its Romanian character, drawing on toponymy and the first Hungarian documents; credits the tradition that Radu Negru of Făgăraș was responsible for the foundation, which took place at Câmpulung and Curtea de Argeș; presents historical information about the region and its Romanian inhabitants over the course of the 13th century and into the first half of the 14th; details offensives launched by the Kingdom of Hungary to the east and south of the Carpathian Mountains during the same period; enumerates nine Romanian lords who possessed Țara Oltului, from Vladislav I to Vlad III; summarized their political relations with the suzerain power; listed the leaders from Vlad to Sigismund Báthory; noted the role of the Romanian Mailat family, and the political implications of controlling the region; briefly listed its property owners from the 17th century, drawing on fiscal records; and ended with 1713, when the Făgăraș domain passed to the state.

Bunea deliberately focuses on the intervals of Romanian domination. He speaks appreciatively of the historiographic achievements of Iorga, Onciul and János Karácsonyi; the text follows the direction set by the leading members of the Romanian critical school, Iorga, Onciul and Ioan Bogdan. However, at times, he expresses disagreement with other historians' opinions, advancing his own historiographic solutions in the same context. He insistently draws upon the document collections of Hurmuzachi; and among Hungarian historians, he prefers Karácsonyi, Frigyes Pesty and Gyula Pauler. An abundantly documented work, its bibliography features over 80 titles in Romanian, Hungarian, German and Latin; there are 225 footnotes, some shorter, others lengthy.

As to Încercare de istoria...., the manuscript was analyzed by Onciul at the Academy's request. He found that the contents mainly dealt with church history and, tangentially, with political history and ethnography. Although it remained unfinished, Onciul recommended publication, both in order to make Bunea's findings known and as an homage. He also began a vast work about the Romanian regiments in the Transylvanian Military Frontier. Although he did not live to complete it, he did gather rich material on the subject. His archive includes numerous documents, both copies and originals, in Latin, Hungarian and German, about the border regiments.
