= Găunoasa River =

Găunoasa River may refer to:

- Găunoasa, a tributary of the Bistrița in Gorj County
- Găunoasa, a tributary of the Holbav in Brașov County

== See also ==
- Găunoșița River
