= Comana (Olt) =

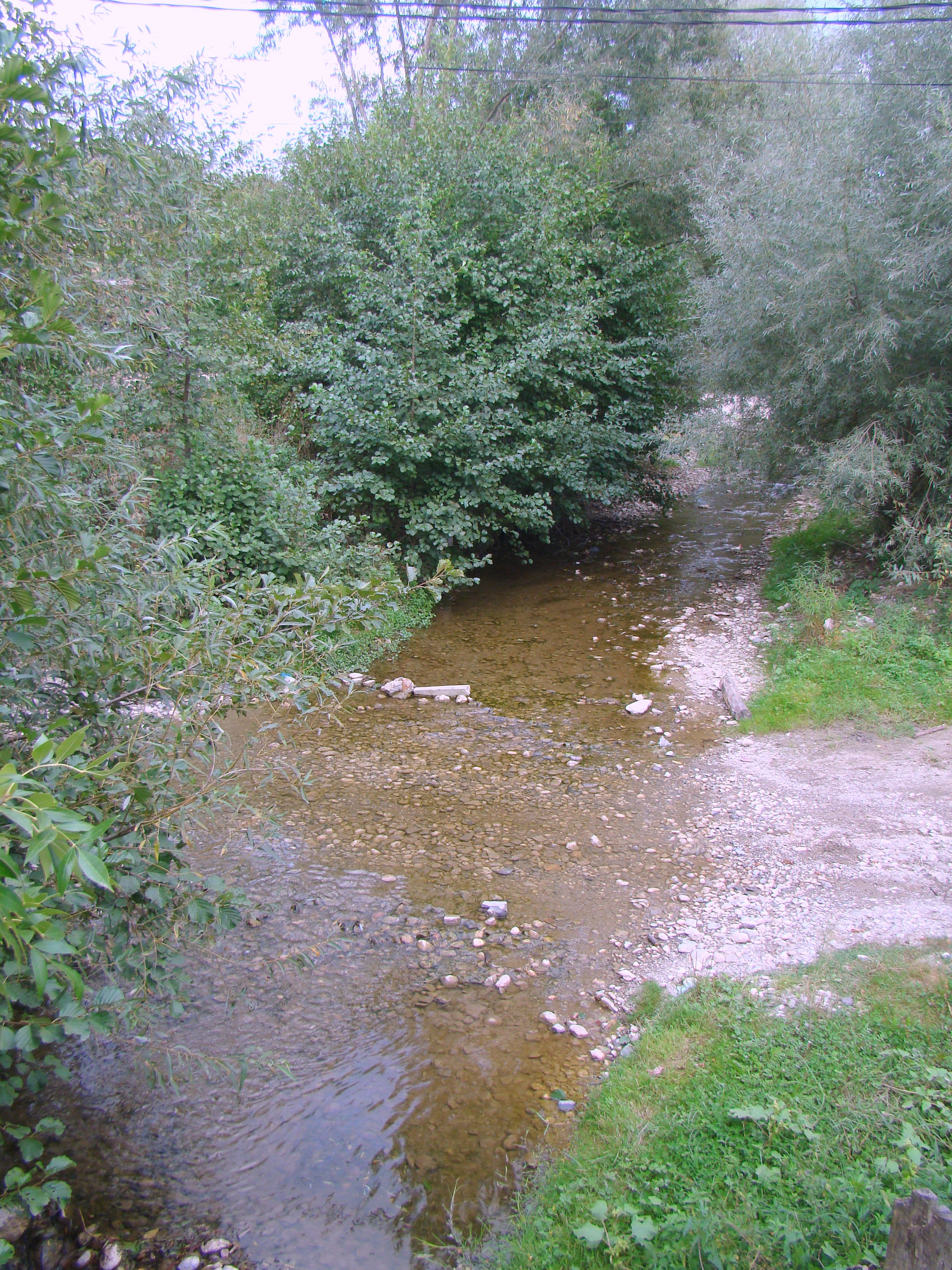

- Location within Romania

Location
- Country: Romania
- Counties: Brașov County
- Villages: Comana de Sus, Comana de Jos

Physical characteristics
- Source: Perșani Mountains
- Mouth: Olt
  - location: Comana de Jos
  - coordinates: 45.9198°N 25.2154°E
- Length: 19 km (12 mi)
- Basin size: 59 km^{2} (23 sq mi)

Basin features
- Progression: Olt→ Danube→ Black Sea
- Tributaries
  - left: Valea Tigăi, Dăbiș

The Comana (in its upper course also Purcaru) is a left tributary of the river Olt in Romania. It discharges into the Olt in Comana de Jos. Its source is in the Perșani Mountains. Its length is 19 km (12 mi) and its basin size is 59 km^{2} (23 sq mi).
