= Șercăița =

- Location within Romania

Location
- Country: Romania
- Counties: Brașov County
- Villages: Șercăița, Ohaba

Physical characteristics
- Mouth: Șercaia
  - location: Șinca Veche
  - coordinates: 45.7799°N 25.1589°E
- Length: 19 km (12 mi)
- Basin size: 65 km^{2} (25 sq mi)

Basin features
- Progression: Șercaia→ Olt→ Danube→ Black Sea
- Tributaries
  - right: Creața

The Șercăița is a left tributary of the river Șercaia in Romania. It flows into the Șercaia between Șinca and Vad. Its length is 19 km (12 mi) and its basin size is 65 km^{2} (25 sq mi).
