= Șercaia (river) =

Șercaia Valea Poiana Mărului, Șinca

- Location within Romania

Location
- Country: Romania
- Counties: Brașov County
- Villages: Poiana Mărului, Șinca Nouă, Șinca Veche, Șercaia

Physical characteristics
- Mouth: Olt
  - location: Hălmeag
  - coordinates: 45.8548°N 25.1384°E
- Length: 46 km (29 mi)
- Basin size: 350 km^{2} (140 sq mi)

Basin features
- Progression: Olt→ Danube→ Black Sea

The Șercaia is a left tributary of the river Olt in Romania. It discharges into the Olt in Hălmeag. Its length is 46 km (29 mi) and its basin size is 350 km^{2} (140 sq mi). The upper reach of the river, upstream of the confluence with the Holbav is also known as Valea Poiana Mărului. The middle reach of the river, from the junction with the Holbav to the confluence with the Scurta (downstream of the village of Vad) is known as the Șinca.

== Tributaries ==
The following rivers are tributaries to the river Șercaia (from source to mouth):

- Left: Strâmba, Plopoasa, Crețu, Șercăița, Scurta, Băluș
- Right: Valea sub Masa Mare, Holbav, Ruda Mică, Ruda Mare, Trestioara
