= Veneția =

- Location within Romania

Location
- Country: Romania
- Counties: Brașov County
- Villages: Veneția de Sus, Veneția de Jos

Physical characteristics
- Source: Perșani Mountains
- Mouth: Olt
  - location: Veneția de Jos
  - coordinates: 45.8827°N 25.1986°E
- Length: 19 km (12 mi)
- Basin size: 49 km^{2} (19 sq mi)

Basin features
- Progression: Olt→ Danube→ Black Sea
- Tributaries
  - right: Venețioara

The Veneția (Romanian pronunciation: [veneˈt͡si.a]) is a left tributary of the river Olt in Romania. It flows into the Olt near Veneția de Jos. Its length is 19 km (12 mi) and its basin size is 49 km^{2} (19 sq mi). The name of the Veneția is spelled like the Romanian exonym for Venice, but they are etymologically unrelated.
