= Alexandru Ciurcu =

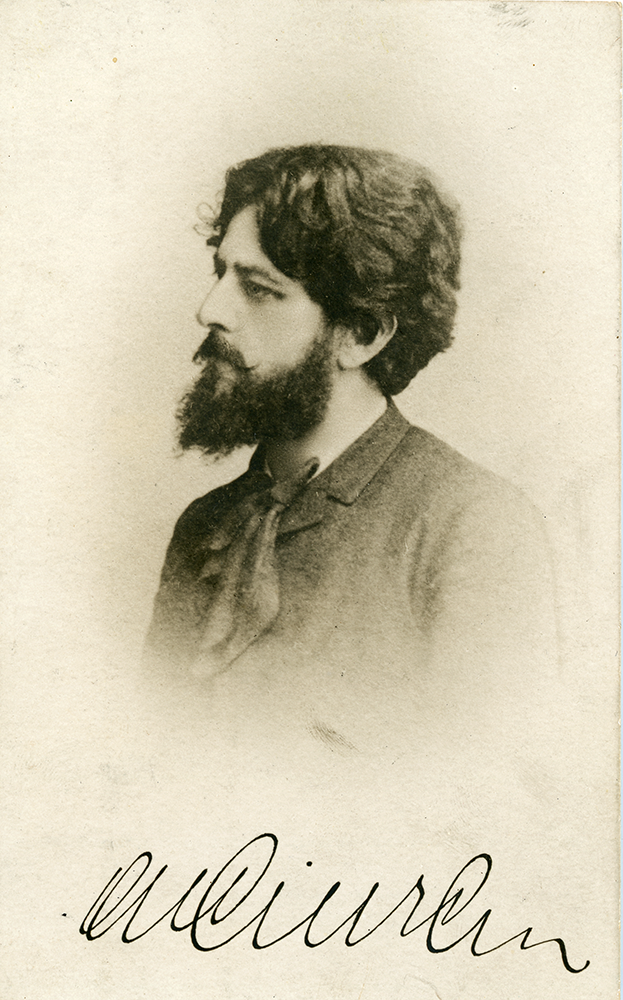
Alexandru Ciurcu

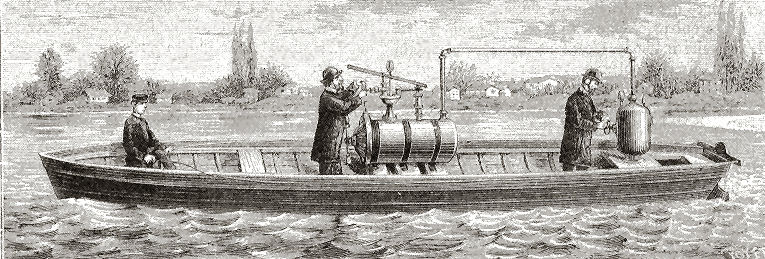
Engraving showing the second experimental vessel of Ciurcu

Alexandru N. Ciurcu (29 January 1854, Șercaia – 22 January 1922, Bucharest) was a Romanian inventor and publisher, known for his invention with the French journalist Just Buisson of a reaction engine. It used rocket propulsion and was briefly used to power a boat, demonstrated on 13 August 1886. The two men envisioned that such motors would later be used for air travel.

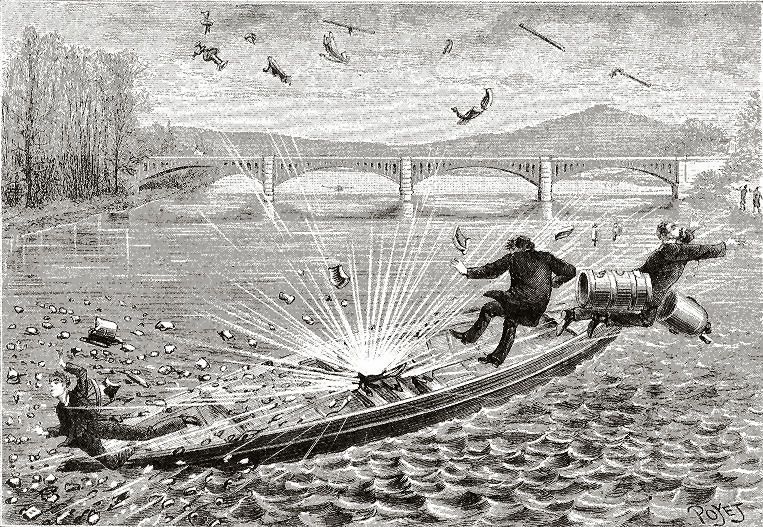
The explosion of 16 December

On 16 December 1886, during a test with a new second engine for the boat at Asnières, the engine exploded. Buisson and an assistant at the helm were killed. Ciurcu survived by swimming ashore, but at first was accused of murder.

== Family ==
One of his cousins was the doctor Sterie N. Ciurcu, who obtained his doctorate in 1877 in Vienna and who worked in Vienna from 1886. A militant for the national cause of the Romanians in the Habsburg empire and editor of some Romanian magazines, he was imprisoned by the Habsburg authorities in 1916, when Romania entered World War I, and died in prison. He was decorated with the Order of the Crown.

== Education ==
Alexandru Ciurcu attended high school in Brașov, taking his baccalaureate in 1872. He studied law at the University of Vienna between 1873 and 1876. He also attended technical courses.
