= Ion Clopoțel =

Romanian literary historian and literary critic (1892 - 1986)

Ion Clopoțel (November 10, 1892 – August 23, 1986) was an Austro-Hungarian-born Romanian journalist, sociographer and memoirist. The native of a rural area west of Brașov, he attended high school in that city and ultimately earned a university degree in Vienna. While still a pupil, he entered the newspaper business, and his political writings during World War I led the authorities to imprison him for about a year. After the war, he resumed his journalistic activity, editing and leading a variety of publications, most notably the Cluj-based Societatea de mâine. A social democrat by conviction, he held a series of mid-level positions under the communist regime.

== Biography ==
=== Early life and education ===
Born in Poiana Mărului, Brașov County, in the Transylvania region that was then part of Austria-Hungary, his parents were Ion Clopoțel and Susana (née Lăzăroiu). After primary school in his native village, he attended Andrei Șaguna High School in Brașov from 1904 to 1912. Due to his good grades and material poverty, he received scholarship assistance in the latter part of this period. He was mentored by teachers who included the cultural figures Virgil Onițiu, Iosif Blaga and Axente Banciu. Also while in high school, he became exposed to the writings of Nicolae Iorga, developing a passion for his works and a desire to meet him personally. Traveling at considerable expense to Vălenii de Munte in the Romanian Old Kingdom, he attended Iorga's "summer university" for five years in a row. In mid-1911, struck by the youth's enthusiasm, the latter asked Clopoțel to inventory and catalogue his personal archive and library.

Clopoțel pursued university studies at Cluj, Budapest and, after Românul was shut down in March 1916, Vienna. He took a degree in literature, specializing in Romance philology, and philosophy. While a student, he was especially interested in sociology; a member of his discussion circle was Lucian Blaga, whom he had known since high school. After Vienna, he deepened his sociological background by taking courses at the University of Paris.

=== Journalistic and political activity ===
He made his publishing debut in 1911 at Românul newspaper in Arad, when he also became editing intern. Immediately after graduating high school in 1912, Vasile Goldiș hired him at the newspaper, where he gradually rose from proofreader to editor-in-chief by the time he left in 1919. His publications there included reports from Vălenii de Munte and reflections on cultural life in the Old Kingdom. In 1917, he took a high school teaching post at Caransebeș. At the end of the year, together with leaders of the Romanian national movement in Transylvania, he was imprisoned at Szeged; his increased political activity had led to a charge of "crimes against the interest of the army and the state". In particular, his writings in the Lugoj-based Drapelul drew the authorities' ire. Released on October 1, 1918, amidst the breakdown of the empire that occurred near the close of World War I, he took part in negotiations for the union of Transylvania with Romania and attended the Great National Assembly in Alba Iulia which ratified the union, serving as press secretary.

He was editor-in-chief of the provincial newspapers Gazeta Transilvaniei (the Brașov-based outfit where Mihai Popovici and Alexandru Vaida-Voevod hired him between 1919 and 1921), Patria and Șoimul. He also worked as Transylvania editor of the Bucharest newspapers Adevărul, Dimineața, Libertatea and of the magazines Lumea nouă, Pagini literare and Societatea de mâine (the last from 1924 to 1945); and was a contributor to Luceafărul. While a resident of Cluj from 1921 to 1934, he made Patria into a mass-circulation newspaper and hosted fruitful debates on sociology and politics within its editorial committee. He also founded Societatea de mâine, which became one of interwar Romania's leading social, political and cultural magazines. Moving to the national capital Bucharest in 1934, he continued at Adevărul and Dimineața while moving Societatea de mâine with him. Due to his left-wing views, he was invited to join Lumea nouă in 1945 by Lothar Rădăceanu; there, he edited the foreign news and wrote about the situation in Transylvania. Among the pseudonyms he used were L. Ardelean, I. Bobei, Dumitru Corvinul, Euphraste, Traian Huniade, I. Poenaru, Dr. Titus Popa, Teofrast, Theophraste, I. Săgeată, and Horia Trandafir.

=== Later years ===
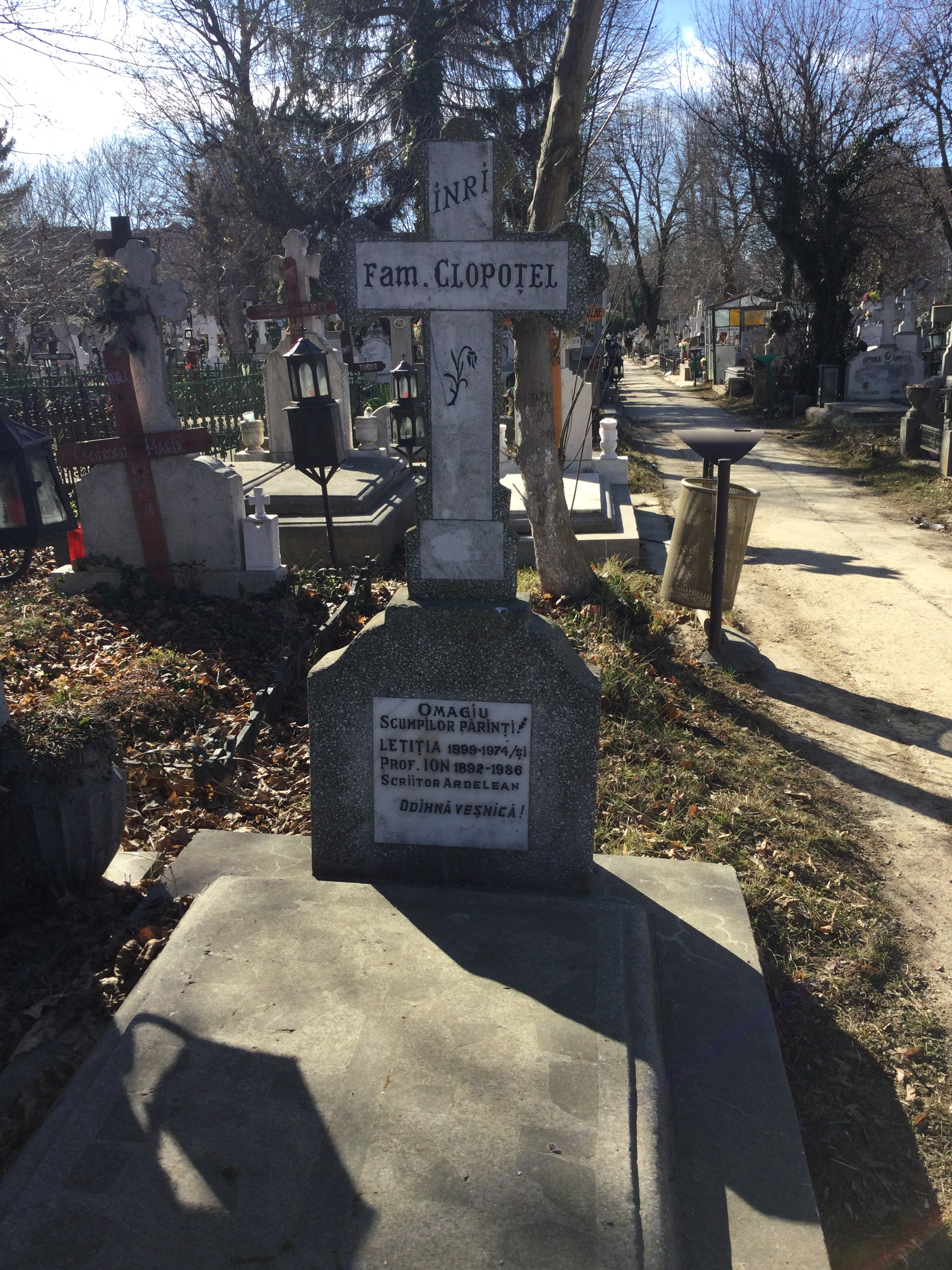
Grave at Sfânta Vineri Cemetery

As president of the Romanian Press Union from 1920 to 1936, he laid the groundwork for a journalists' cultural institute. In 1926, he founded a journalists' library and Almanahul presei române. He was elected to the Assembly of Deputies, representing Făgăraș. In 1944, after the Coup against Romania's pro-Axis dictator, he edited the socialist Poporul newspaper from Brașov, intending to use it to reorganize the country along social democratic lines. He was also president of the regional organization of the Romanian Social Democratic Party, to which he had belonged since 1930.

With the gradual onset of a communist regime, he became inspector-general of workers' schools (appointed by Rădăceanu), rector of the Free University of Brașov and director of the Central University Library of Bucharest, retiring in 1961. He authored the four-volume Antologia a scriitorilor români de la 1821 încoace (1917–1918), in which he selected passages from both representative and lesser known Romanian-language authors of the previous century. While this was his only large-scale work of literary history, his activity as historian and critic continued at Societatea de mâine, where he reviewed forty-six novels. His memoirs appeared as Frământările unui an. 1918 (1919) and Amintiri și portrete (1975). He won the Romanian Writers' Union prize in 1975, and a special prize from the same organization in 1982. He died in 1986 and was buried at Sfânta Vineri Cemetery in Bucharest.
