= Holbav (river) =

- Location within Romania

Location
- Country: Romania
- Counties: Brașov County
- Villages: Holbav, Paltin

Physical characteristics
- Mouth: Șercaia
  - coordinates: 45.6549°N 25.2833°E
- Length: 13 km (8.1 mi)
- Basin size: 73 km^{2} (28 sq mi)

Basin features
- Progression: Șercaia→ Olt→ Danube→ Black Sea
- Tributaries
  - left: Vulcănița
  - right: Valea Lupului, Găunoasa

The Holbav (Hungarian: Holbáki patak) is a right tributary of the river Șercaia in Romania. It flows into the Șercaia south of Șinca Nouă. Its length is 13 km (8.1 mi) and its basin size is 73 km^{2} (28 sq mi).
