= DN73A =

Road in Romania

National Road 73A
- Drumul Național 73A
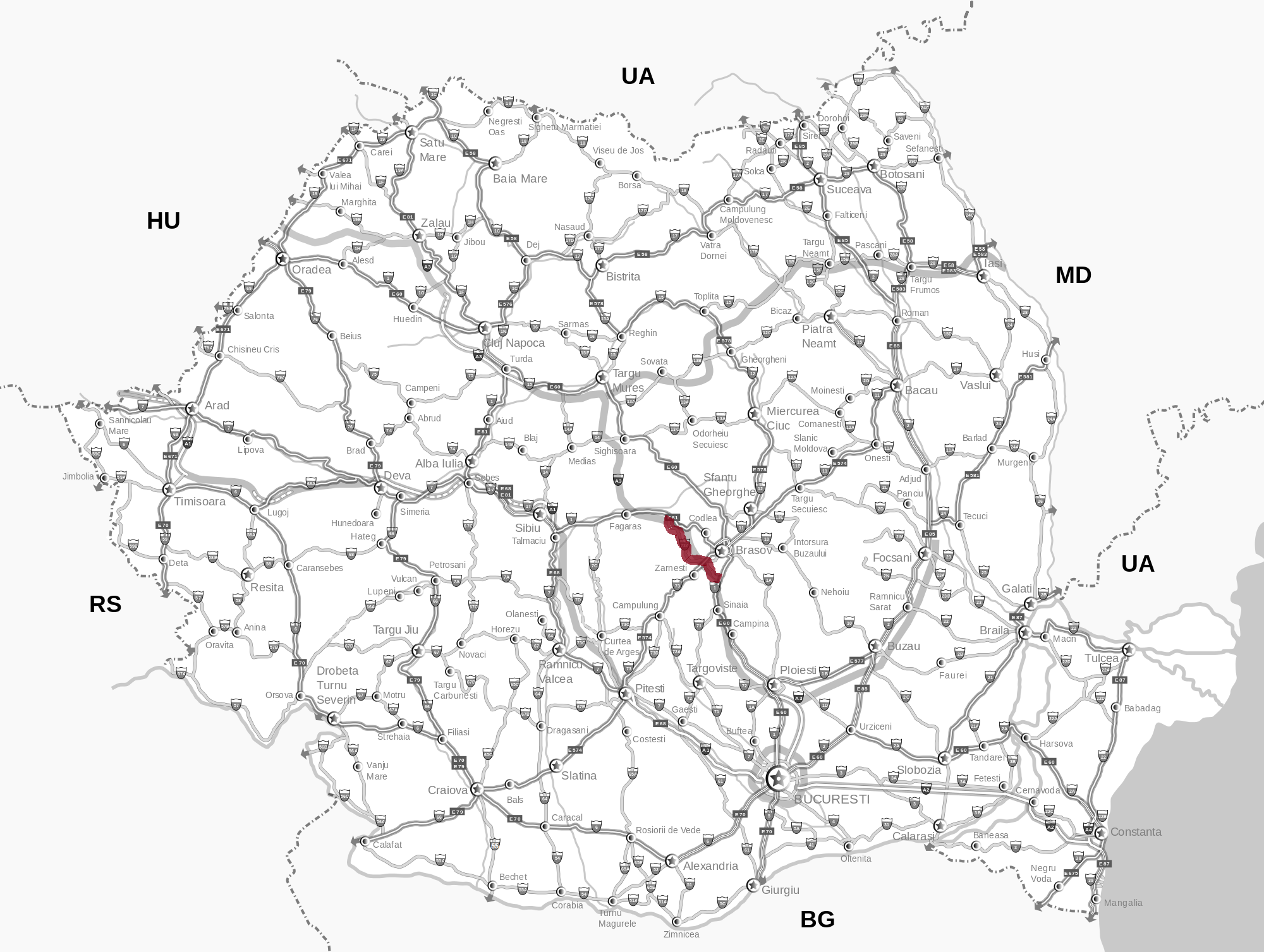

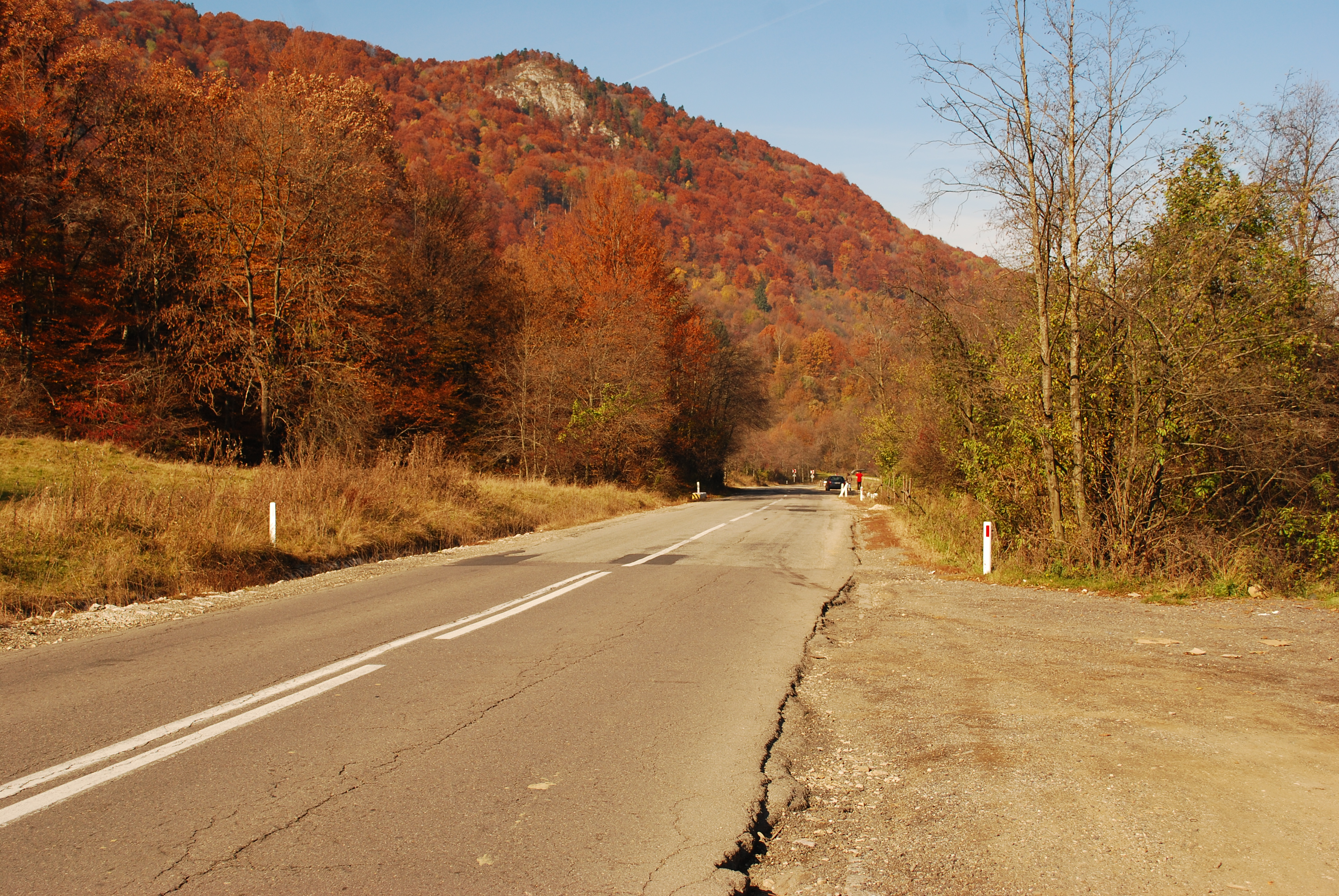

Route information
- Length: 68.3 km (42.4 mi)

Major junctions
- South end: Predeal
- DN1 at Predeal; DN73 at Râșnov; DN1 & DN1J at Șercaia
- North end: Șercaia

Location
- Country: Romania
- Counties: Brașov County
- Municipalities: Poiana Mărului, Șinca Nouă, Șinca, Șercaia
- Major cities: Predeal, Râșnov, Zărnești

Highway system
- Roads in Romania; Highways

DN73A (Romanian: Drumul Național 73A) is a national road in Romania that starts from Predeal, reaching Șercaia.

== Road ==
The national road DN73A starts from the entrance to Predeal, coming from DN1 from Bucharest, goes by Cold River, goes down to Burzenland in Râșnov, where it intersects with DN73. Then it goes through the Old Tohan neighborhood of Zărnești city, reaches Poiana Mărului, and then it goes down to Țara Făgărașului, goes to Șinca Nouă, and then Șinca Veche. Between Șinca Veche and Ohaba, DN73A shares a segment with county road DJ104. From Ohaba, it goes through Vad, ending in Șercaia, at the intersection with DN1.

== Historic and architectural monuments ==
- Râșnov Fortress
- Șinca
  - Grota (Monastery) under Pleșul Hill, also known as Temple of Fate, from Șinca Veche.
  - Monastic Hermitage Birth of Mary the Virgin from Șinca Veche.
  - The Great Cave from Merești, in the Perșani Mountains, discovered in the 18th century where it was found ceramics marks from the first Age of Steel (Hallstatt culture).
  - Bucium Monastery, near Bucium village.
- Fortified Saxon Church from Șercaia, attested in 1429, owned by Saint Katherine.
- Fortified Evangelical-Lutheran church from Halmeag, built in the second half of the 11th century, which illustrates the passing phase from Romanesque architecture to Gothic art.

== Other places with touristic interests and nature monuments ==
- Predeal
  - Ski area, with 5 areas
  - Climatic Station Cold River
- Zărnești
  - The City Day is celebrated each summer, in August: "Zărnești city days"-"Edelweiss Festival"
  - National Park Stone of Crawl
- Șinca
  - Perșani Baths from Perșani, with mineral springs
- Vad
  - Plugarul, folkloric habit that takes place in the second day of Easter
  - Poiana Narciselor from Vad, Nature reserve

== Bibliography ==
- ADAC Straßenatlas Ost-Europa, ADAC e.V. München, 1993
- Harta rutieră, Indexul localităților, România, Romania, Rumänien, Roumanie,1:700.000, Szarvas.Kárpátia, 2007
- Nicolae Pepene, Bogdan Popovici, Victor Ștefănescu, Florina Rusu, O istorie a Râșnovului în imagini, Editura Suvenir, 2006
