= Poiana Mărului =

- Commune
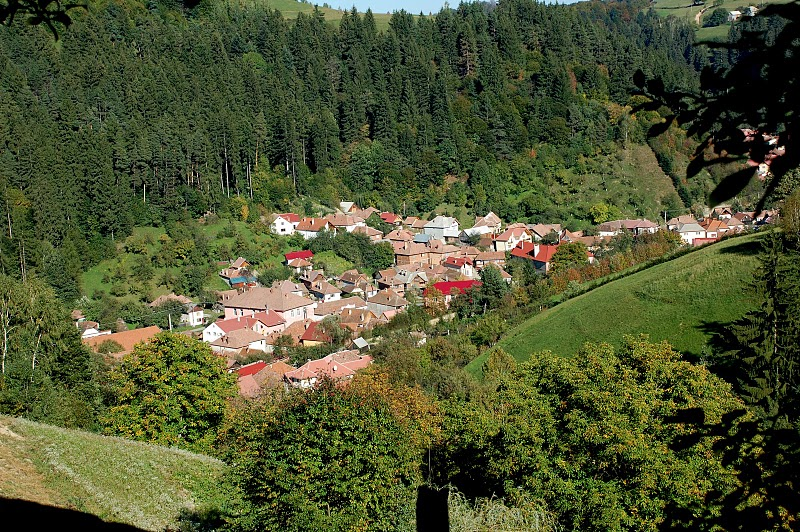

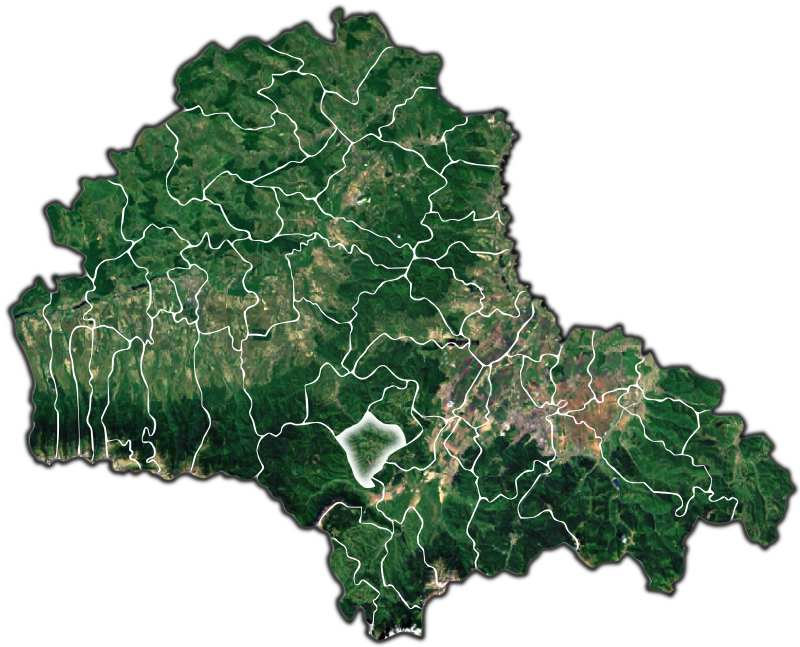
- Location within the county

- Location in Romania
- Coordinates: 45.6167°N 25.3167°E
- Country: Romania
- County: Brașov

Government
  - Mayor (2020–2024): Alexandru-Cătălin Perșoiu (PSD)
- Area: 94.6 km^{2} (36.5 sq mi)
- Elevation: 627 m (2,057 ft)
- Population (2021-12-01): 2,956
  - Density: 31.2/km^{2} (80.9/sq mi)
- Time zone: UTC+02:00 (EET)
  - Summer (DST): UTC+03:00 (EEST)
- Postal code: 507160
- Area code: (+40) 02 68
- Vehicle reg.: BV
- Website: primariapoianamarului.ro

Poiana Mărului (German: Bleschbach; Hungarian: Almásmező) is a commune in Brașov County, Transylvania, Romania. It is composed of a single village of the same name.

The commune is located in the central-south part of the county, in a hilly area north of the Piatra Craiului Mountains, on the banks of the river Șercaia. It is crossed by national road DN73A, which runs from Predeal to Șercaia; the county seat, Brașov, is 32 km (20 mi) to the east, and can be reached via DN73.

Historical population
Year	Pop.	±%
2002	3,456	—
2011	3,315	−4.1%
2021	2,956	−10.8%
Source: Census data

== Natives ==
- Ion Clopoțel (1892–1986), journalist, sociographer, and memoirist.
