= Părău =

- Commune
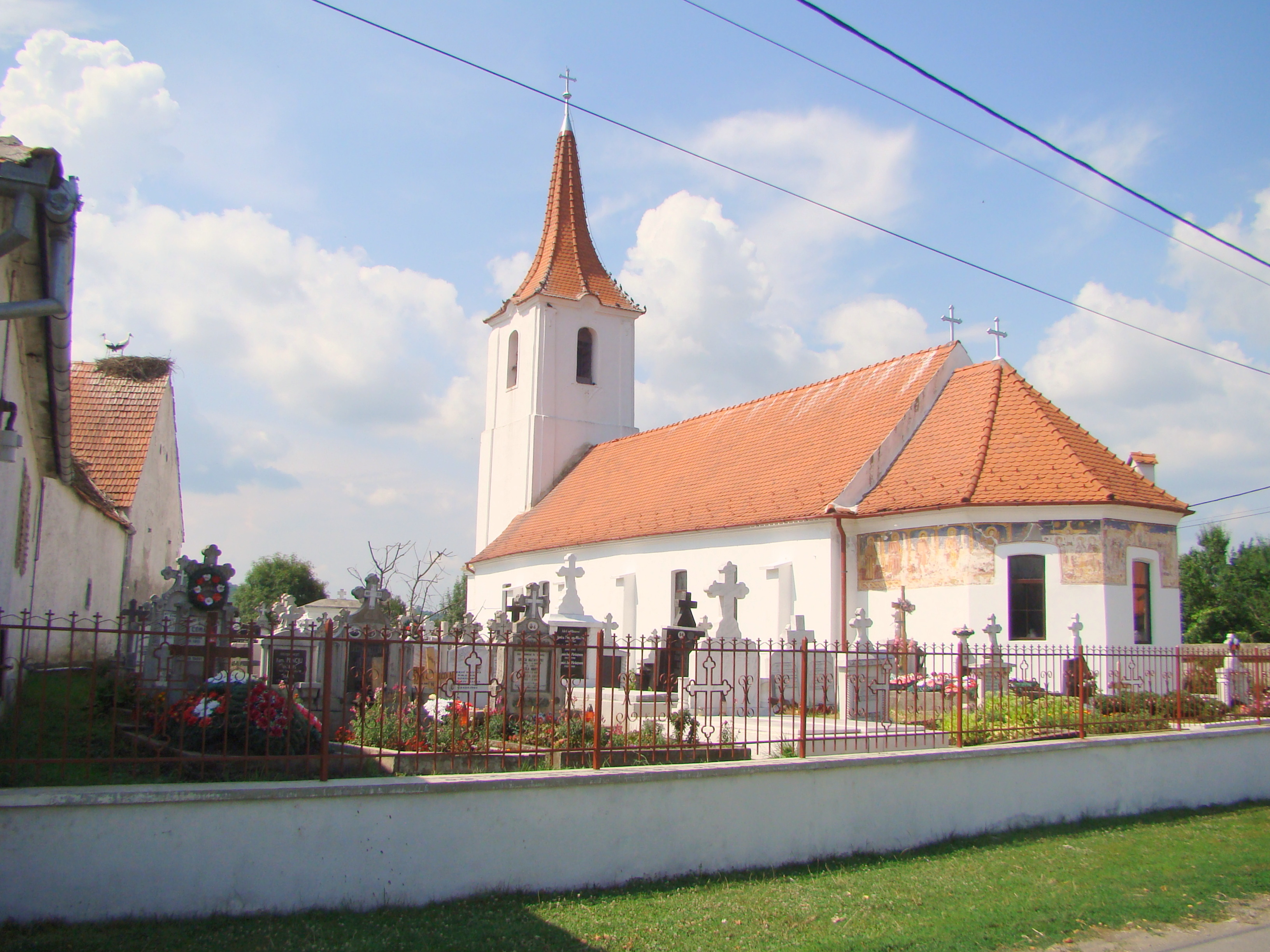
- Church of the Dormition in Veneția de Jos

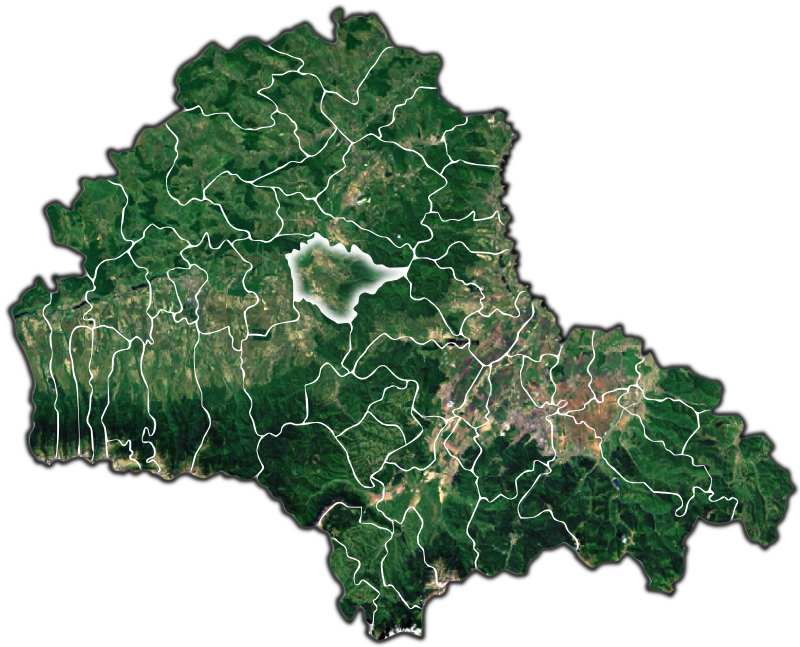
- Location within the county

- Location in Romania
- Coordinates: 45°51′N 25°11′E
- Country: Romania
- County: Brașov

Government
  - Mayor (2020–2024): Ovidiu-Alexandru Ovesea (PMP)
- Area: 111.62 km^{2} (43.10 sq mi)
- Elevation: 443 m (1,453 ft)
- Population (2021-12-01): 2,091
  - Density: 18.73/km^{2} (48.52/sq mi)
- Time zone: UTC+02:00 (EET)
  - Summer (DST): UTC+03:00 (EEST)
- Postal code: 507155
- Area code: (+40) 02 68
- Vehicle reg.: BV
- Website: comuna-parau.ro

Părău (German: Mikesdorf-Berau; Hungarian: Páró) is a commune in Brașov County, Transylvania, Romania. It is composed of four villages: Grid, Părău, Veneția de Jos (Untervenitze; Alsóvenice), and Veneția de Sus (Felsővenice).

The commune is situated in the center of the county, in the historic Țara Făgărașului region. It lies on the left bank of the Olt River. The river Veneția discharges into the Olt near Veneția de Jos, while the river Părău flows into the Olt near the village Părău.

Părău is crossed by the national road DN1S, which runs from Șercaia to Hoghiz. It is located at a distance of 19 kilometres (12 mi) from Făgăraș and 60 km (37 mi) from Brașov.

Historical population
Year	Pop.	±%
2002	2,123	—
2011	1,874	−11.7%
2021	2,091	+11.6%
Source: Census data

== Natives ==
- Aurel Cornea (1933 – 2005), mathematician
- Dimitrie Eustatievici (1730 – 1796), philologist, scholar, and pedagogue
