= Părău (river) =

Părău Perșani
- Location within Romania

Location
- Country: Romania
- Counties: Brașov County
- Villages: Perșani, Părău

Physical characteristics
- Source: Perșani Mountains
- Mouth: Olt
  - location: Părău
  - coordinates: 45.8655°N 25.1734°E
- Length: 20 km (12 mi)
- Basin size: 84 km^{2} (32 sq mi)

Basin features
- Progression: Olt→ Danube→ Black Sea
- Tributaries
  - right: Valea Lungă, Grid, Valea Comorilor

The Părău is a left tributary of the river Olt in Romania. It flows into the Olt near the village Părău. The upper reach is also known as Perșani. Its length is 20 km (12 mi) and its basin size is 84 km^{2} (32 sq mi).
