= Holbav =

- Commune
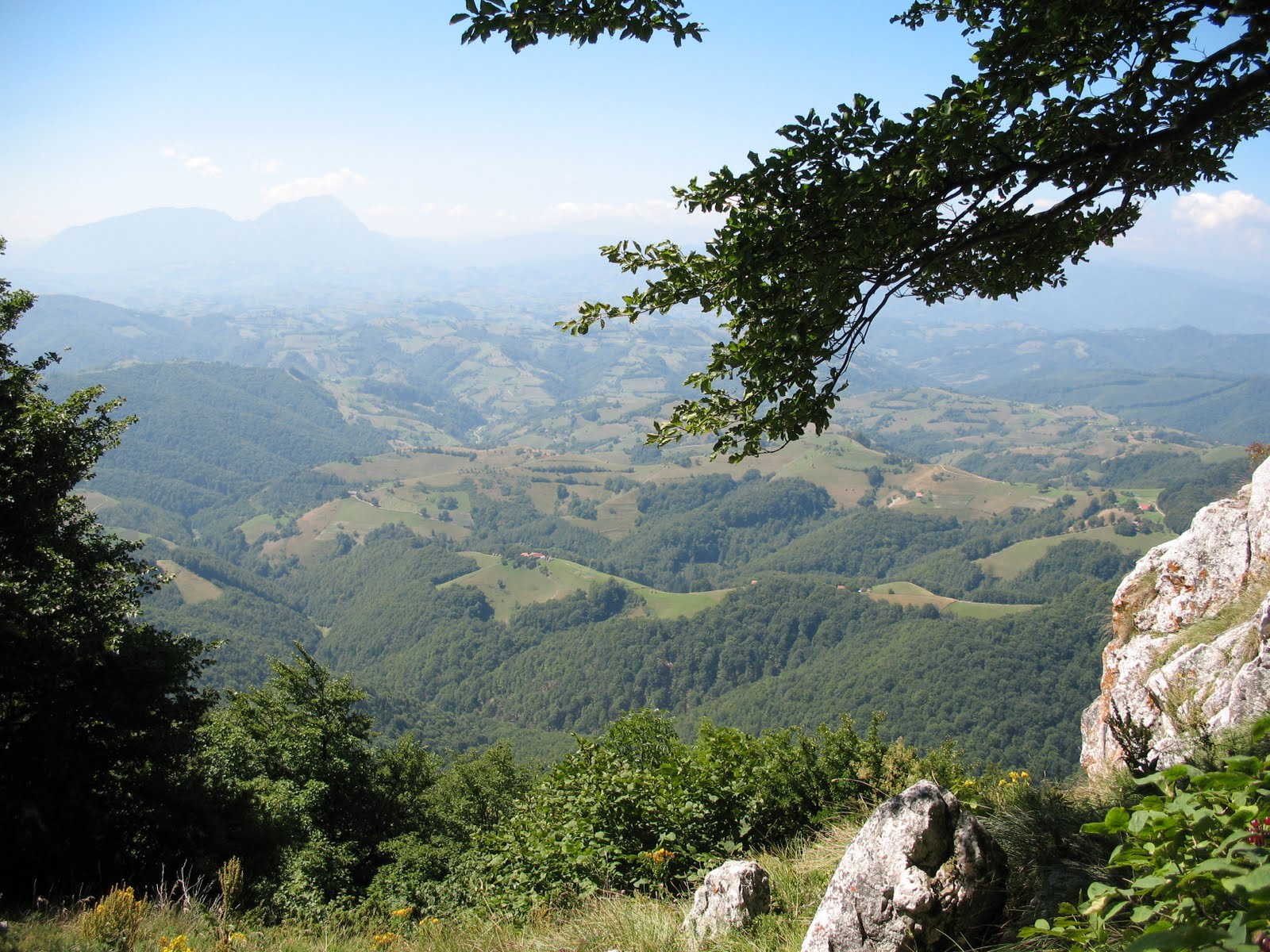
- View from Măgura Codlei towards Holbav

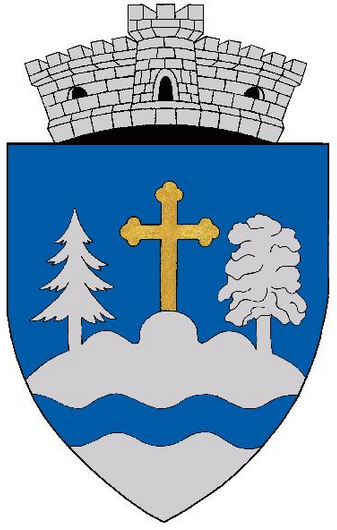
- Coat of arms

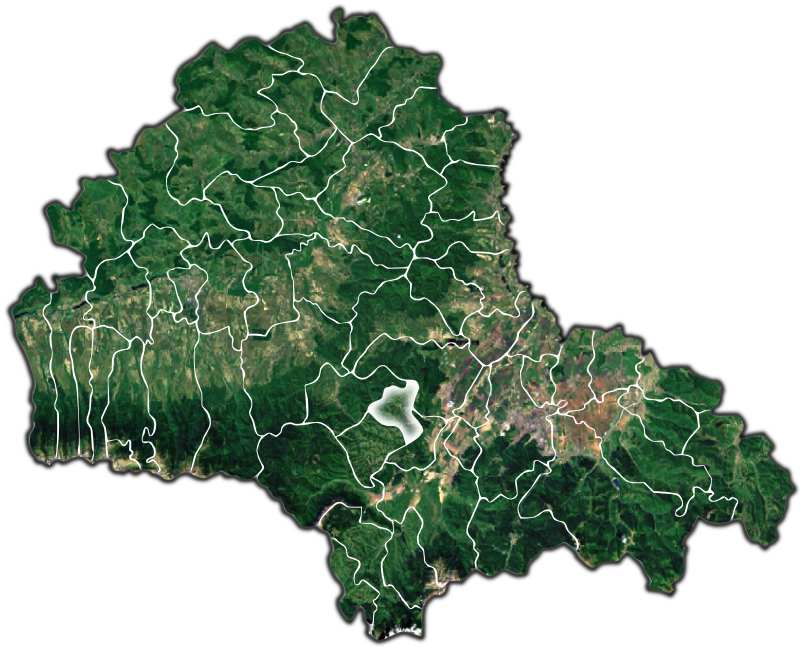
- Location within the county

- Location in Romania
- Coordinates: 45°39′N 25°23′E
- Country: Romania
- County: Brașov

Government
  - Mayor (2020–2024): Lucian-Vasile Oprea (PSD)
- Area: 20.94 km^{2} (8.08 sq mi)
- Elevation: 589 m (1,932 ft)
- Population (2021-12-01): 1,234
  - Density: 58.93/km^{2} (152.6/sq mi)
- Time zone: UTC+02:00 (EET)
  - Summer (DST): UTC+03:00 (EEST)
- Postal code: 507272
- Area code: (+40) 02 68
- Vehicle reg.: BV
- Website: primariaholbav.ro

Holbav (German: Holbach; Hungarian: Holbák) is a commune in Brașov County, Transylvania, Romania. It is composed of a single village, Holbav, part of Vulcan Commune until 2004, when it was split off.

The commune lies on the banks of the river Holbav, at the foot of the Perșani Mountains. It is located in the central part of the county, 10 km (6.2 mi) southwest of the city of the Codlea and 23 km (14 mi) west of the county seat, Brașov.

Historical population
Year	Pop.	±%
2002	1,362	—
2011	1,309	−3.9%
2021	1,234	−5.7%
Source: Census data

== See also ==
- Vlad Dumitrescu. "Satul Holbav". www.revista-satul.ro (in Romanian).
