= Șinca Nouă =

- Commune
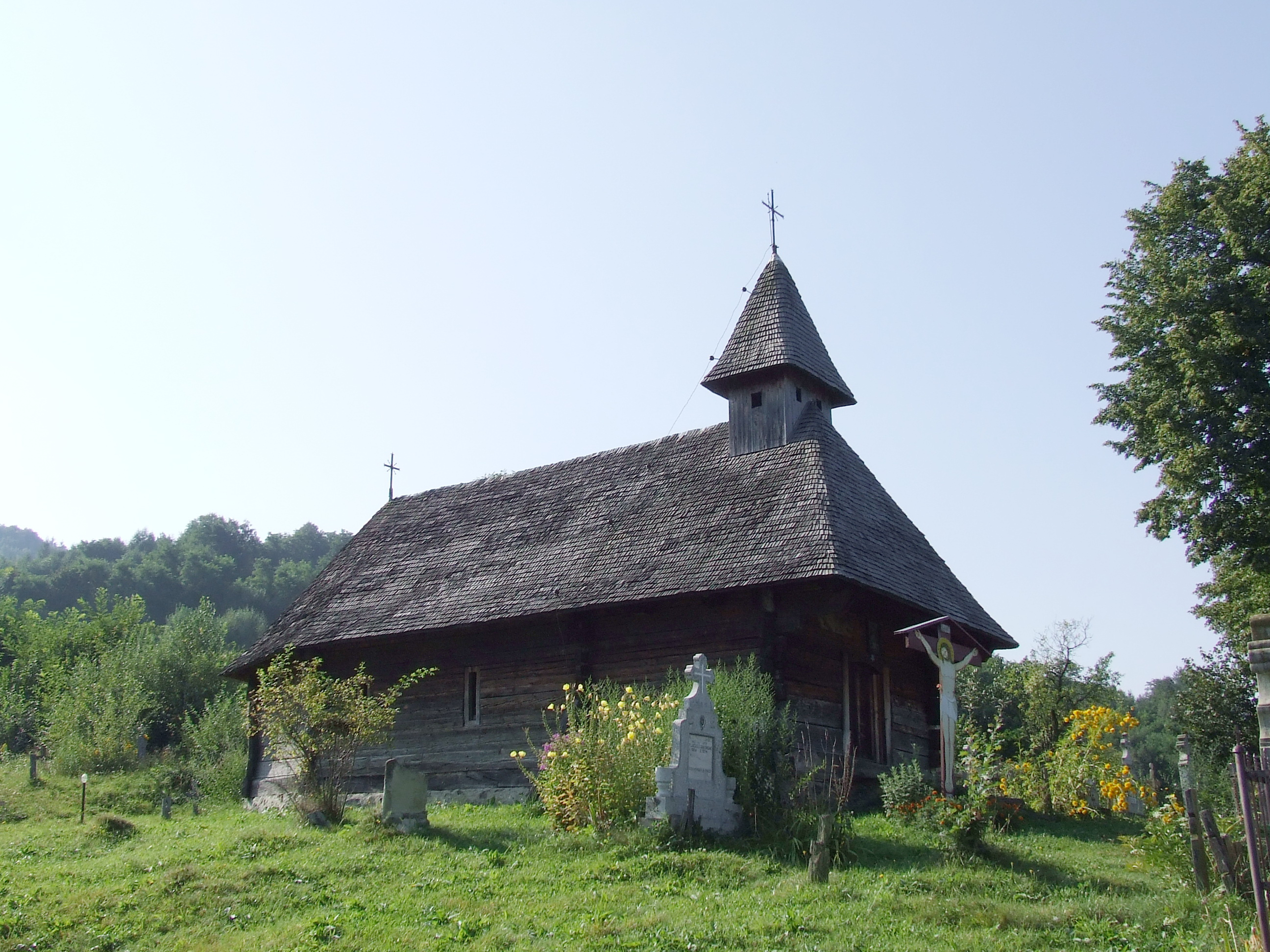
- Wooden church in Șinca Nouă

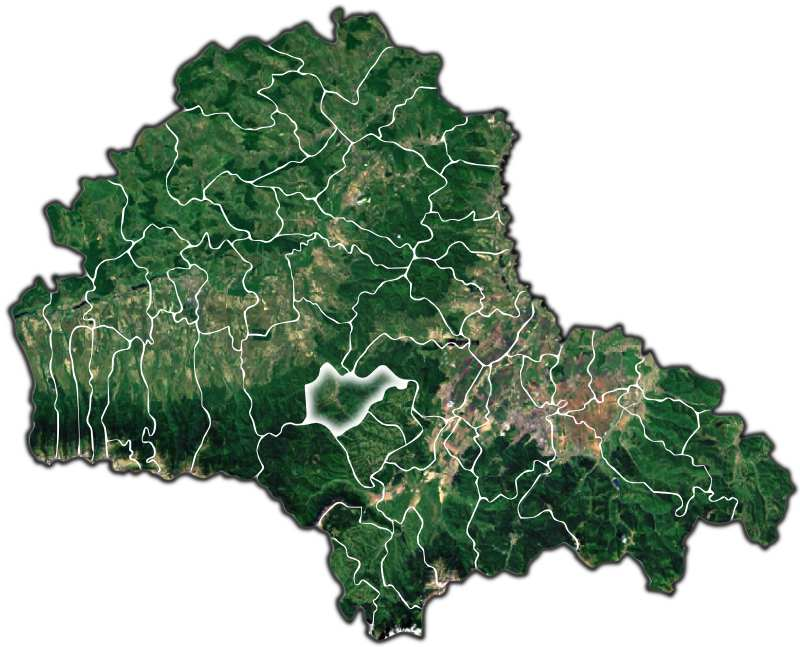
- Location within the county

- Location in Romania
- Coordinates: 45°42′N 25°14′E
- Country: Romania
- County: Brașov

Government
  - Mayor (2021–2024): Adrian-Dan Ciocan (PNL)
- Area: 86.94 km^{2} (33.57 sq mi)
- Elevation: 531 m (1,742 ft)
- Population (2021-12-01): 1,632
  - Density: 18.77/km^{2} (48.62/sq mi)
- Time zone: UTC+02:00 (EET)
  - Summer (DST): UTC+03:00 (EEST)
- Postal code: 507210
- Area code: (+40) 02 68
- Vehicle reg.: BV
- Website: www.sincanoua.eu

Șinca Nouă (German: Neu-Schenk; Hungarian: Újsinka) is a commune in Brașov County, Transylvania, Romania. It is composed of two villages, Paltin and Șinca Nouă, and also administers a hamlet, Strâmba.

The commune is located in the central part of the county, in a hilly area between the Piatra Craiului Mountains to the south and the Olt River to the north, at the eastern edge of the historic Țara Făgărașului region. It lies on the banks of the Șercaia River, a left tributary of the Olt.

Șinca Nouă is crossed by national road DN73A, which runs from Predeal to Șercaia. The county seat, Brașov, is 38 km (24 mi) to the east, and can be reached via DN73, while the city of Făgăraș is 34 km (21 mi) to the northwest.

Historical population
Year	Pop.	±%
2002	1,586	—
2011	1,690	+6.6%
2021	1,632	−3.4%
Source: Census data

At the 2021 census, the commune had a population of 1,632, with an absolute majority (97.18%) of Romanians.

The wooden church in Șinca Nouă dates from 1761.
