= Comăna =

- Commune
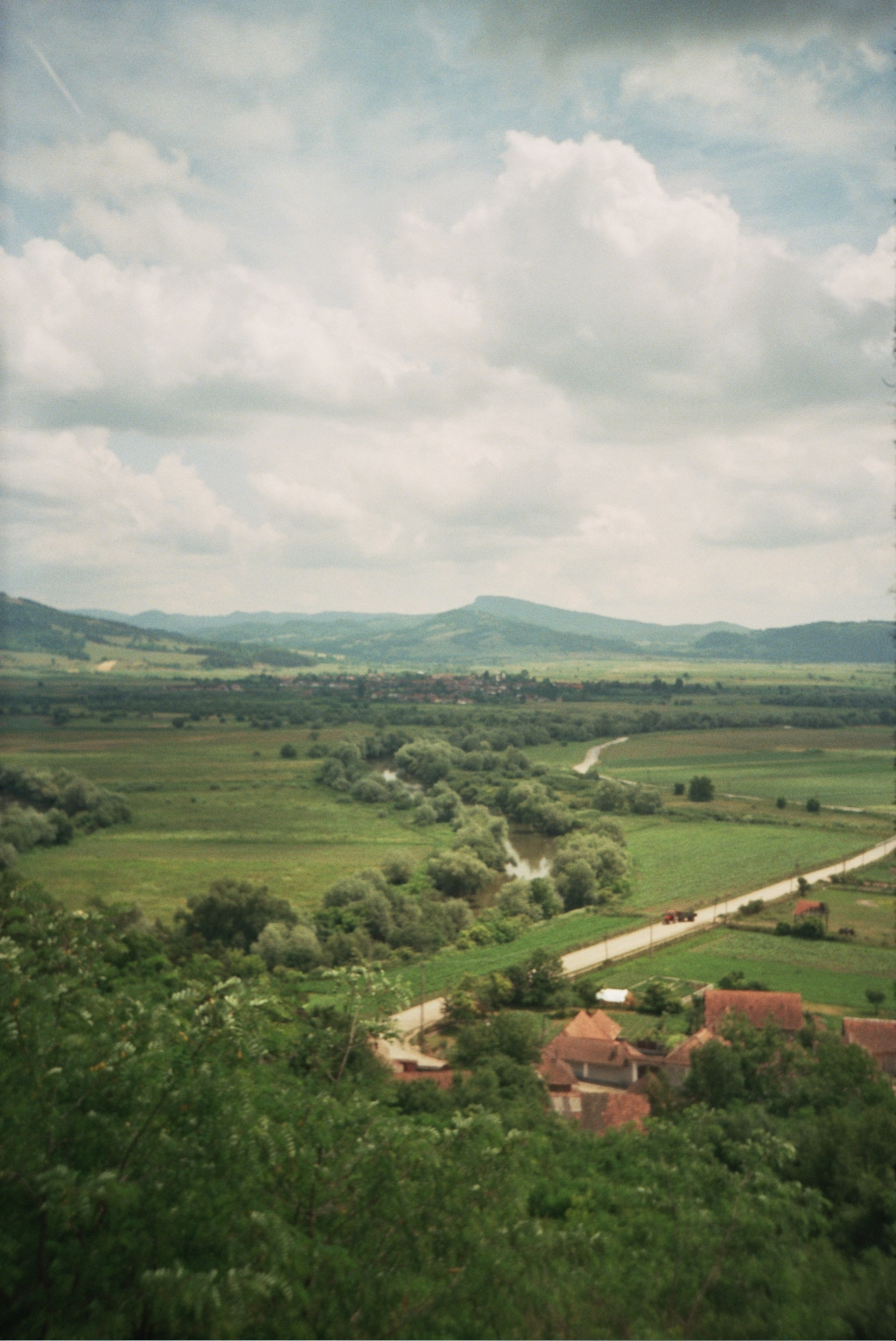
- View over Comăna commune

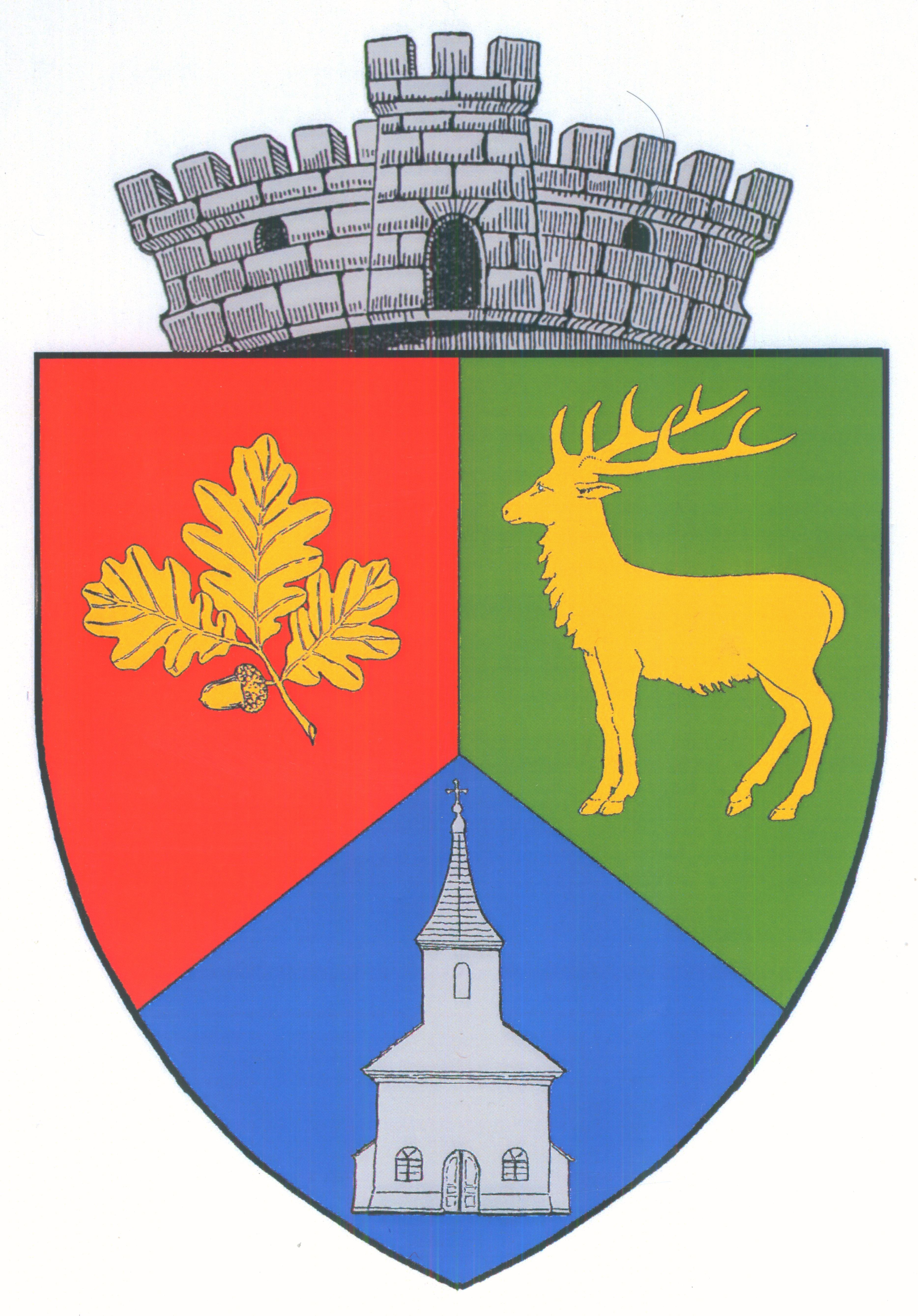
- Coat of arms

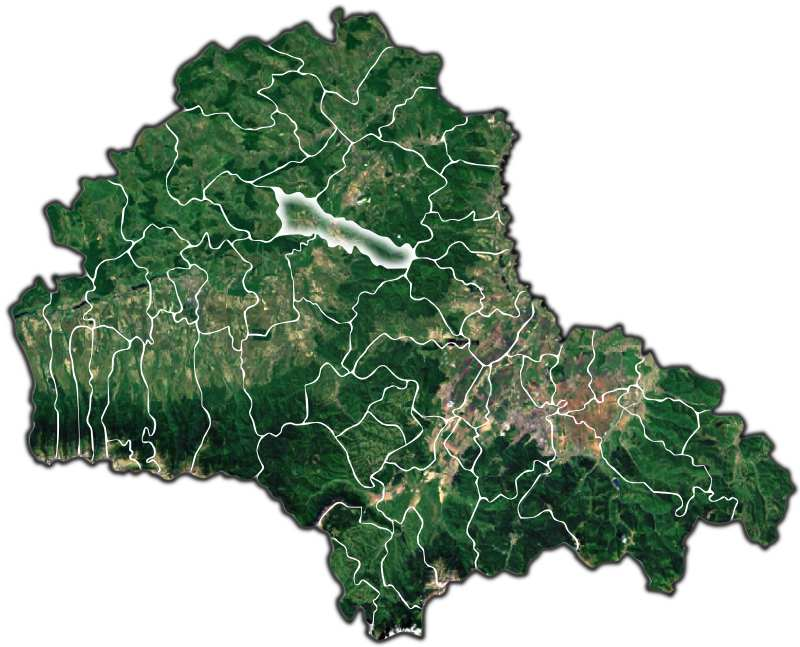
- Location within the county

- Location in Romania
- Coordinates: 45°54′36″N 25°13′48″E
- Country: Romania
- County: Brașov

Government
  - Mayor (2020–2024): Viorel Grusea (PNL)
- Area: 97.26 km^{2} (37.55 sq mi)
- Elevation: 430 m (1,410 ft)
- Population (2021-12-01): 2,803
  - Density: 28.82/km^{2} (74.64/sq mi)
- Time zone: UTC+02:00 (EET)
  - Summer (DST): UTC+03:00 (EEST)
- Postal code: 507050
- Area code: +40 x68
- Vehicle reg.: BV
- Website: www.comuna-comana.ro

Comăna (German: Kumanen, Komondjen; Hungarian: Alsókomána) is a commune in Brașov County, Transylvania, Romania. It is composed of four villages: Comăna de Jos (the commune center), Comăna de Sus (Felsőkomána), Crihalma (Königsberg; Királyhalma), and Ticușu Nou (Rumänisch Tekes; Felsőtyúkos).

Comăna is traversed north to south by the Olt River. It borders the following communes: Părău to the south, Măieruș to the east, Hoghiz to the north, and Ticușu to the west.

== History ==
Comăna de Jos was an important administrative center of the eastern part of Țara Făgărașului, at a time when Ștefan Mailat – who was born here in 1502 – ruled over Transylvania. Villages falling within the jurisdiction of this center were: Comăna de Sus, Veneția de Jos, Veneția de Jos, Crihalma, Ticușu Nou, Cuciulata, and Lupșa. In the current area of Comăna de Jos, human settlements were discovered that attest to the existence of people in the following places:

- A Bronze Age settlement from the 2nd to the 1st century B.C.
- The La Tène culture is represented by a Hallstatt settlement from the 8th and 9th centuries.
- Settlements from the early medieval era (11th to 13th century).

Important archaeological discoveries. In Comăna de Jos, it was investigated that dwellings dug into the soil at different depths, being unveiled 14 huts and 18 little huts, with diverse planimetry with installation of fire ovens consisting of stone and clay. Was also found and existing facilities upgraded fire outdoors. Archaeological research from 1974 to 1976 concluded that construction traces, ruins and ceramics (by wheel and by hand) belong to various periods of time. Ceramic found here is similar to the one found in the areas inhabited by the Dacians.

Early census In 1733, when the Romanian Greek Catholic bishop Inocențiu Micu-Klein decided to organize a census in Transylvania, 34 families were reviewed in the village of Comăna de Jos. In other words, in Comăna de Jos of the year 1733, there were around 170 inhabitants. In the same census is to be noted that in Comăna de Jos there were two Greek Catholic priests, both having the surname Iuon (John). The village had a Greek Catholic church and a manse. The name of the village was written in Hungarian as Alsó-Komana, whereas the results were intended for a committee consisting of non-Romanians, mostly Hungarians.

== Population ==
At the 2011 census, the population of Comăna commune numbered 2,556 inhabitants. At 2021 census, the population had increased to 2,803.

The population between 1850 and 2021, according to the Hungarian and Romanian censuses:

Census of Comăna		Ethnic structure
Year	Population	Romanians	Hungarians	Germans	Roma	Ukrainians	Other
1850	3,437	3,311	9	-	117
1857	3,578
1880	3,419	3,140	124	10	147
1890	3,383	3,164	158	9	52
1900	3,435	3,223	145	34	33		1
1910	3,580	3315	177	25	63	5	1
1920	3,620	3,569	37		14
1930	3,519	3,442	38	7	32
1941	3,312	3,069	18	-	225
1956	3,254	2,956	20	2	276
1966	3,135	2,867	23	-	245
1977	2,822	2,351	9	3	459
1992	2,619	1,575	11	1	1,032
2002	2,635	2,005	11	0	616	1	2
2011	2,556	2,083	3	0	375	0	95
2021	2,803	2,051			506

== Natives ==
- Ștefan Mailat (1502–1550) – captain of Făgăraș Citadel and Prince of Transylvania.

== Gallery ==
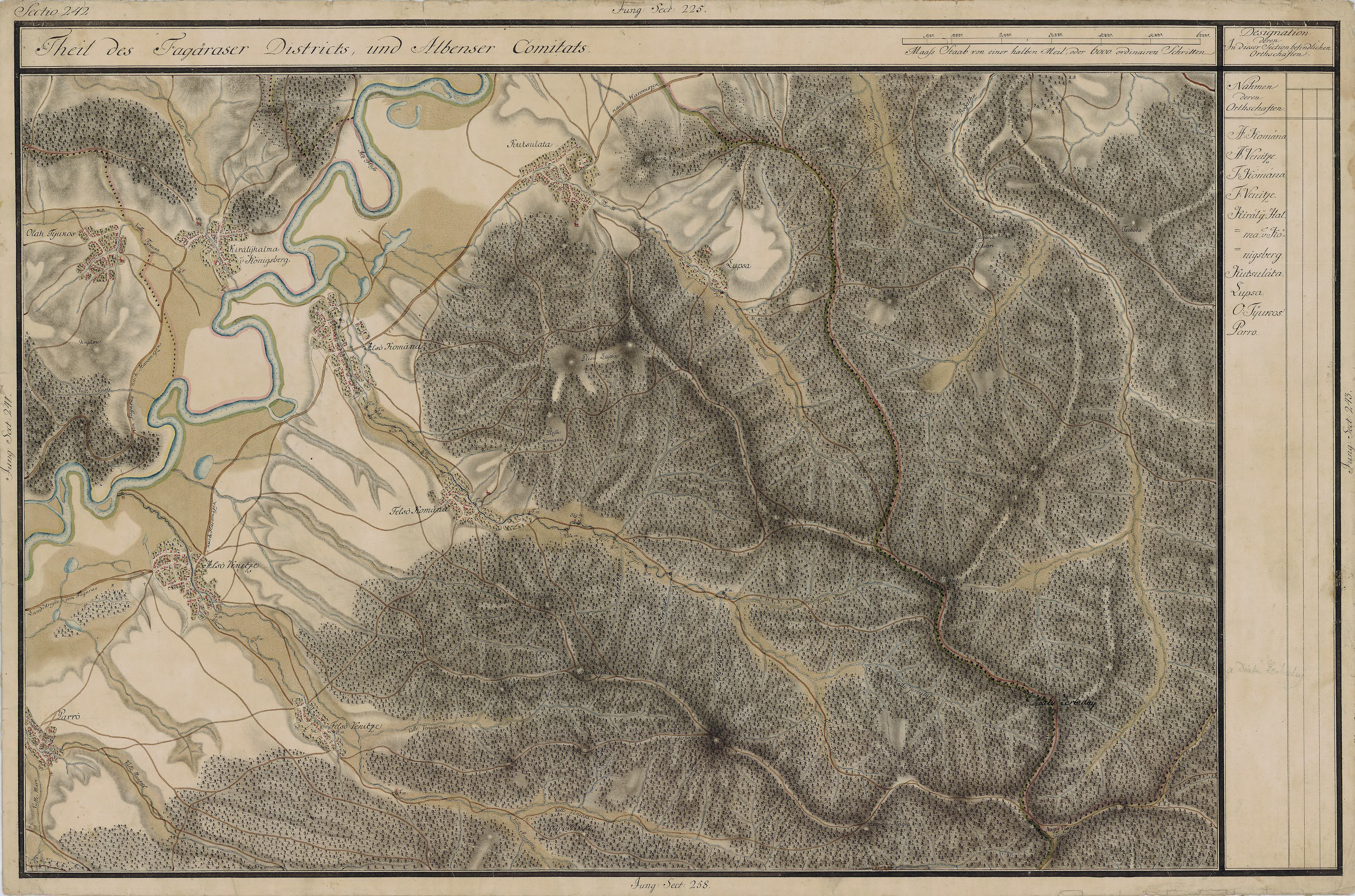
Old map of Comăna de Jos and the area

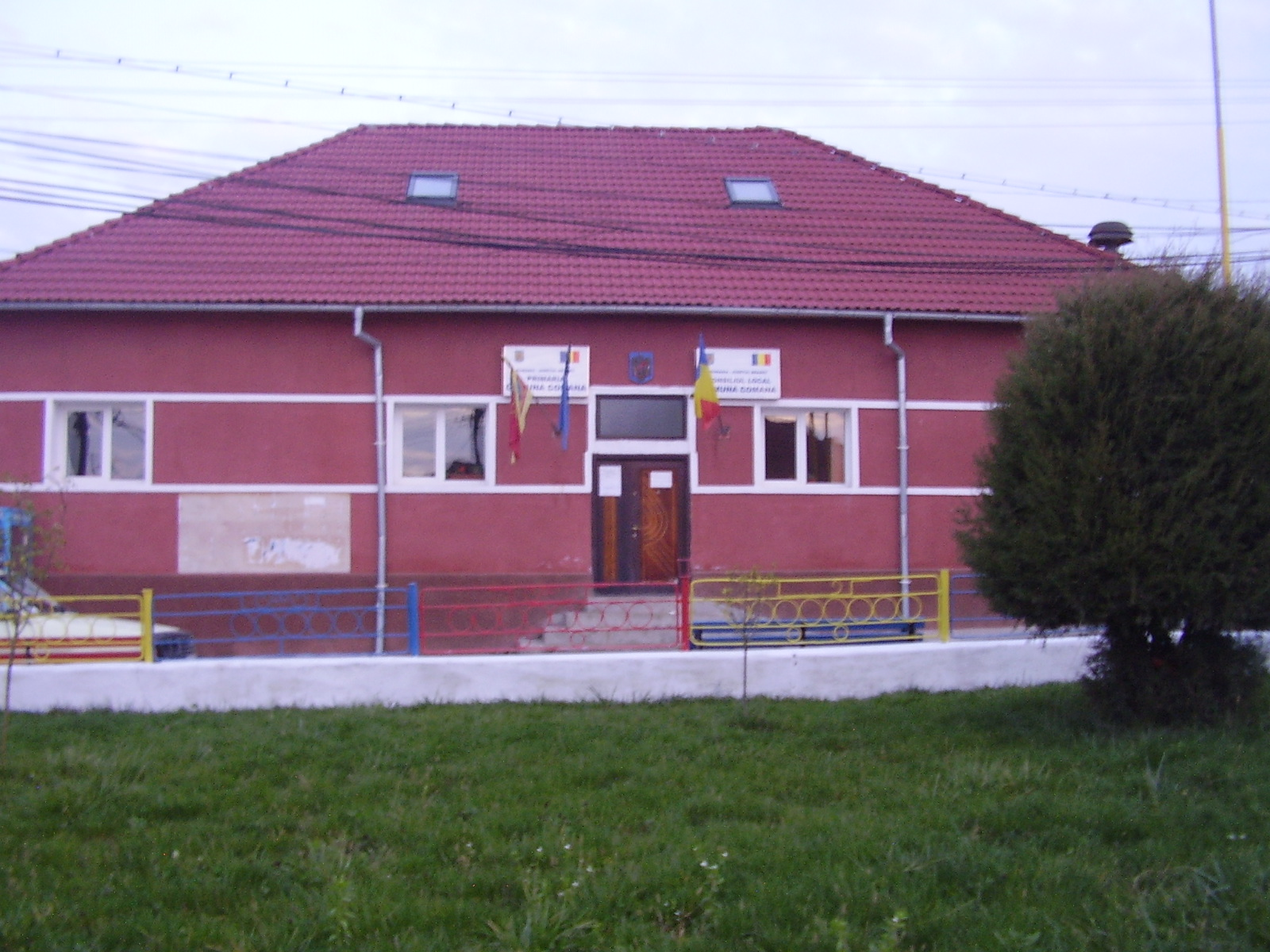
Town Hall

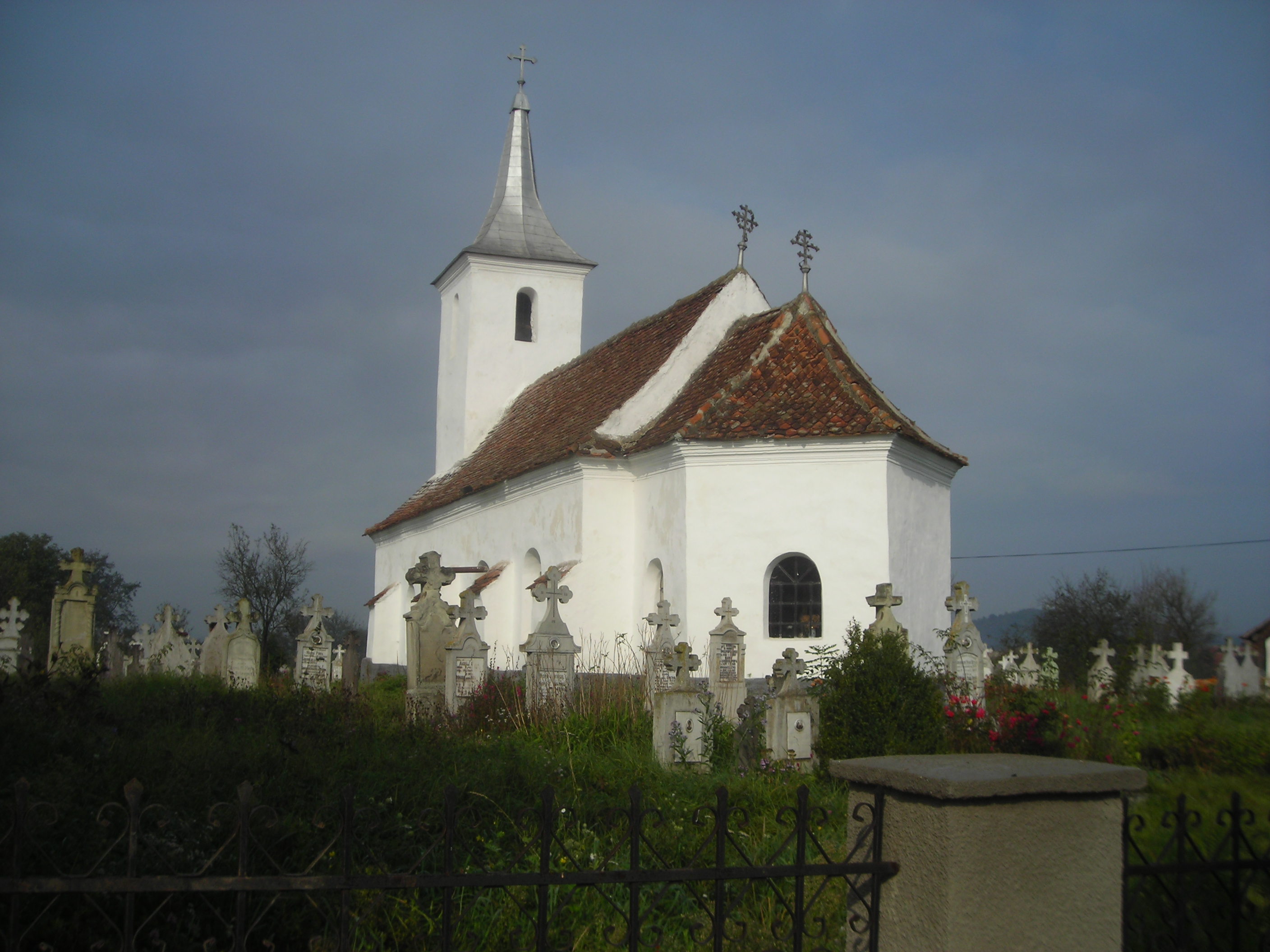
Church in Comăna de Jos
