= Ticușu =

- Commune
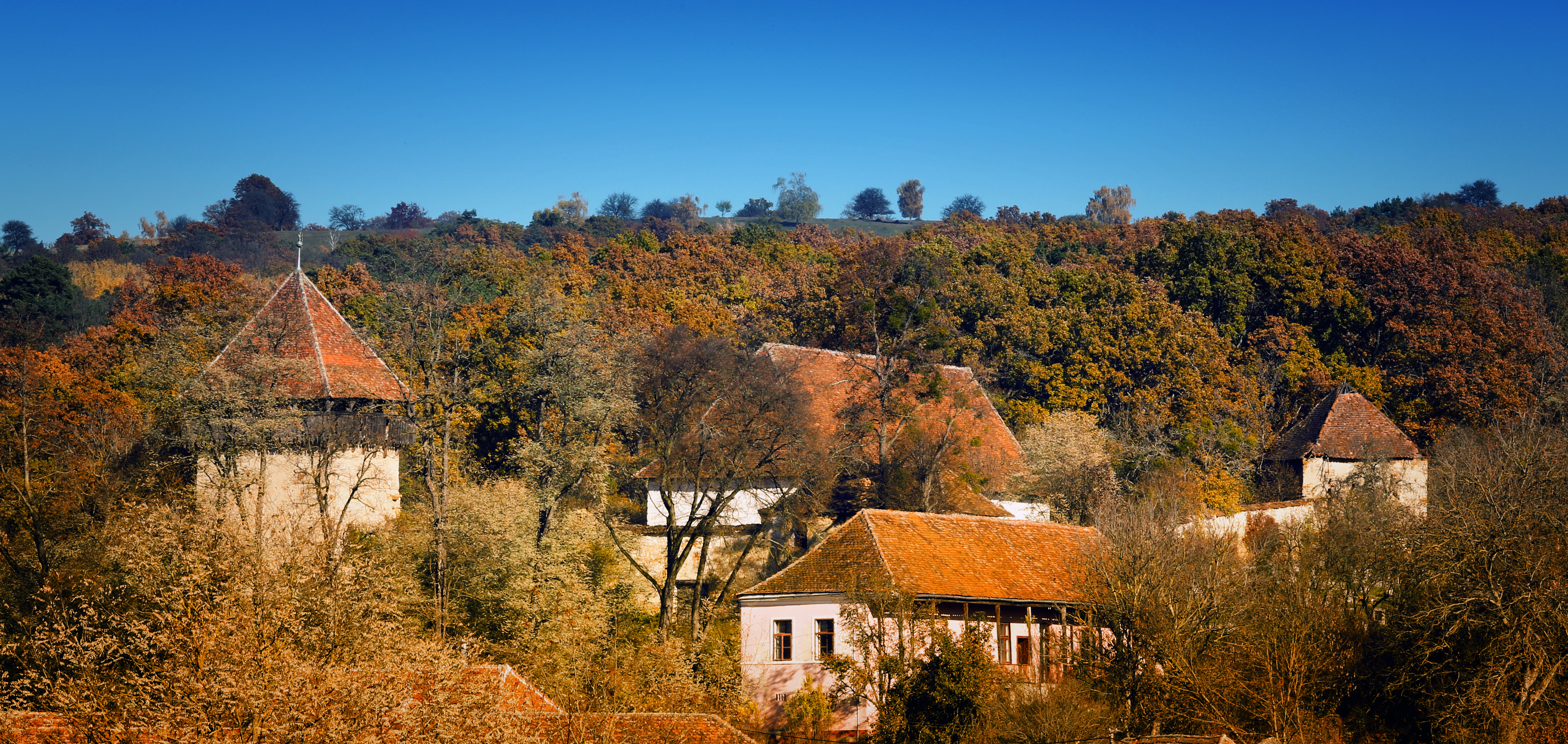
- Fortified Reformed church in Cobor

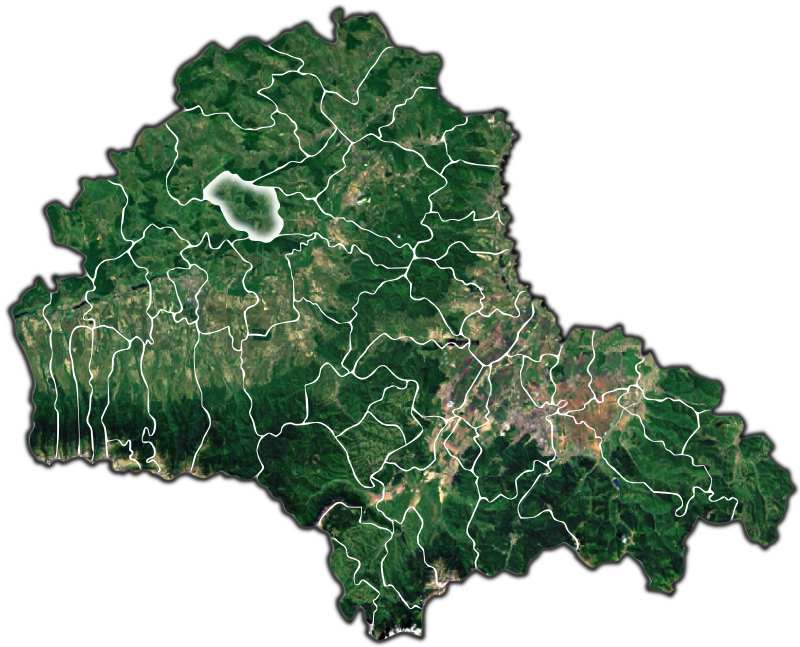
- Location within the county

- Location in Romania
- Coordinates: 45°55′48″N 25°05′59″E
- Country: Romania
- County: Brașov

Government
  - Mayor (2020–2024): Emil-Mircea Șchiopea (PNL)
- Area: 69.53 km^{2} (26.85 sq mi)
- Elevation: 488 m (1,601 ft)
- Population (2021-12-01): 960
  - Density: 14/km^{2} (36/sq mi)
- Time zone: UTC+02:00 (EET)
  - Summer (DST): UTC+03:00 (EEST)
- Postal code: 507225
- Area code: (+40) 02 68
- Vehicle reg.: BV
- Website: primaria-ticus.ro

Ticușu (German: Konradsdorf; Hungarian: Szásztyúkos) is a commune in Brașov County, Transylvania, Romania. It is composed of two villages, Cobor (Kiwern; Kóbor) and Ticușu Vechi (the commune center).

Ticușu is located in the northwestern part of the county, at 25 kilometres (16 mi) from Făgăraș, 33 kilometres (21 mi) from Rupea, and 80 kilometres (50 mi) from Brașov. It borders the following communes: Comăna to the east; Ungra to the northeast; Jibert to the north and west; and Mândra, Șercaia, and Șoarș to the south.

Historical population
Year	Pop.	±%
1850	2,308	—
1941	2,403	+4.1%
1977	1,483	−38.3%
2002	866	−41.6%
2011	908	+4.8%
2021	960	+5.7%
Source: Census data

At the 2011 census, Ticușu had 908 inhabitants, of whom 65.7% were Romanians, 20.4% Roma and 12.6% Hungarians. At the 2021 census, the commune had a population of 960; of those, 44.5% were Romanians, 7% Hungarians, and 1.46% Germans.
