= Șinca =

- Commune
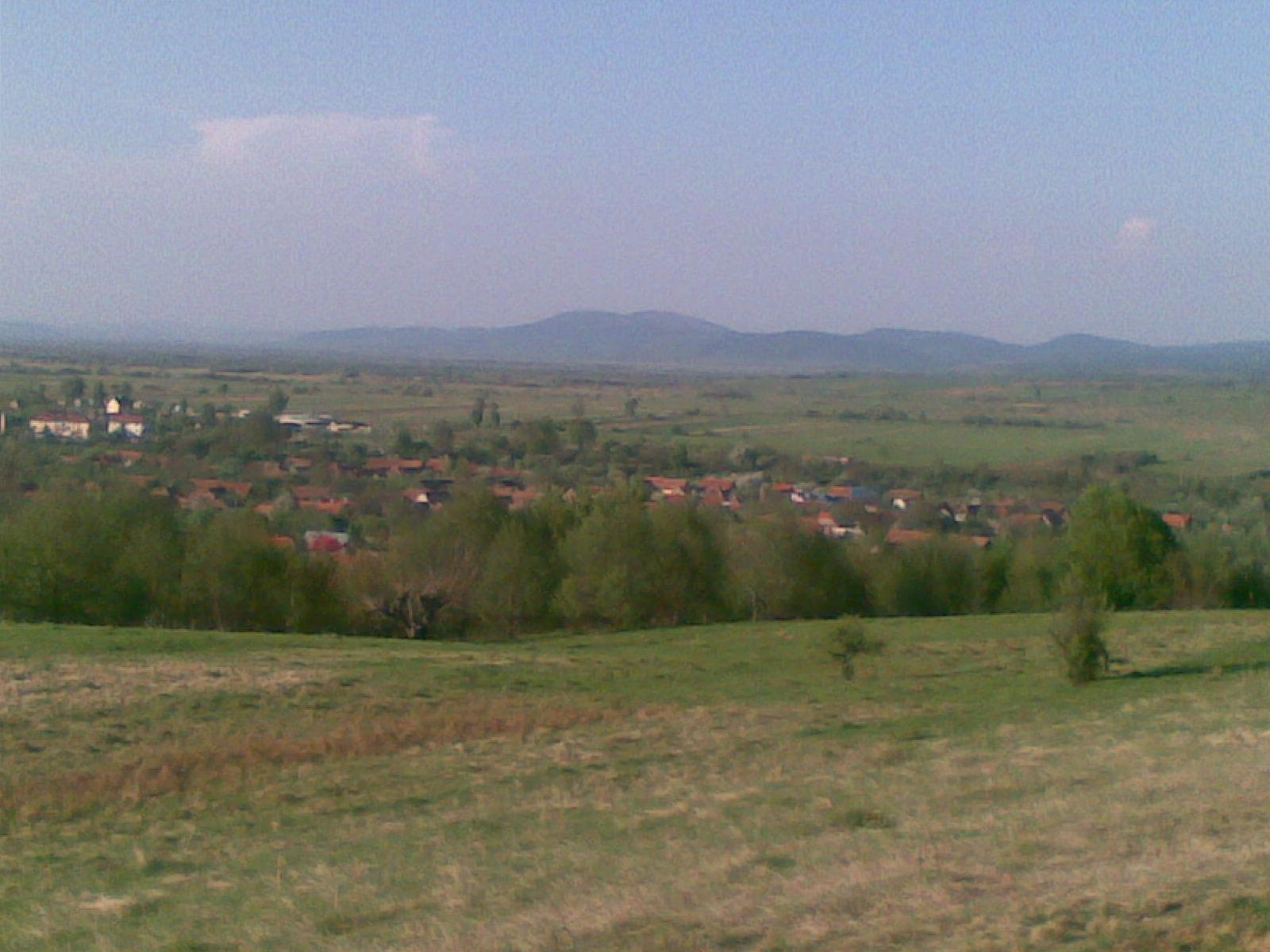

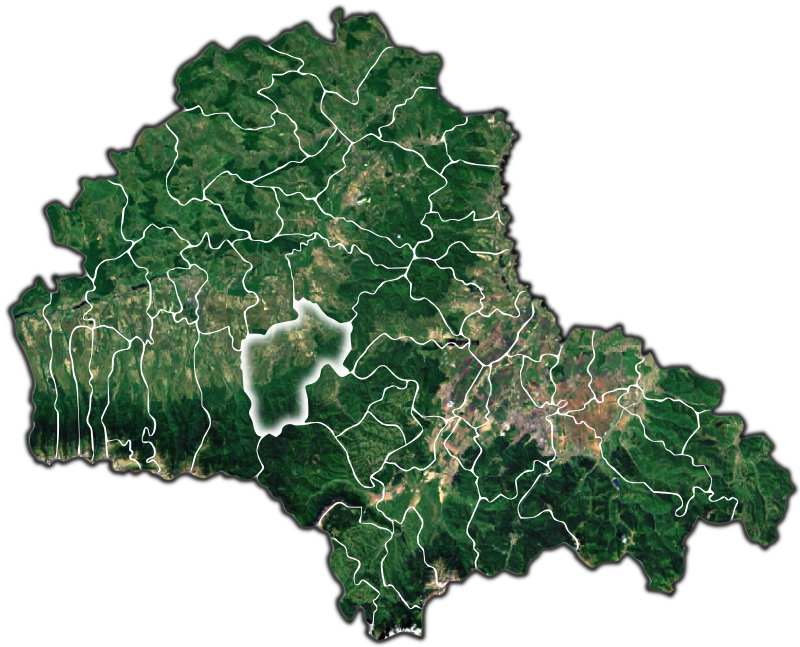
- Location within the county

- Location in Romania
- Coordinates: 45°44′04″N 25°08′59″E
- Country: Romania
- County: Brașov

Government
  - Mayor (2020–2024): Victor Bârlez (PNL)
- Area: 180.59 km^{2} (69.73 sq mi)
- Elevation: 531 m (1,742 ft)
- Population (2021-12-01): 3,521
  - Density: 19.50/km^{2} (50.50/sq mi)
- Time zone: UTC+02:00 (EET)
  - Summer (DST): UTC+03:00 (EEST)
- Postal code: 507206
- Area code: (+40) 02 68
- Vehicle reg.: BV
- Website: comunasinca.ro

Șinca (German: Alt-Schenk; Hungarian: Ósinka) is a commune in Brașov County, Transylvania, Romania. It is composed of six villages: Bucium (Bucsum), Ohaba (Ohába), Perșani (Persány), Șercăița (Sarkaica), Șinca Veche (the commune center), and Vâlcea (Valcsatelep).

The commune is located in the central part of the county, in a hilly area between the Făgăraș and Piatra Craiului mountains to the south, the Perșani Mountains to the east, and the Olt River to the north, at the eastern edge of the historic Țara Făgărașului region. It is situated in the southern part of the Transylvanian Plateau, at an altitude of 531 m (1,742 ft). The river Părău flows through Perșani village, the river Șercaia flows through Șinca Veche village, while its left tributary, the Șercăița, flows through Șercăița and Ohaba villages.

Șinca is crossed by national road DN73A, which runs from Predeal to Șercaia. The county seat, Brașov, is 50 km (31 mi) to the southeast and can be reached via DN1, while the city of Făgăraș is 24 km (15 mi) to the northwest.

Historical population
Year	Pop.	±%
2002	3,545	—
2011	3,401	−4.1%
2021	3,521	+3.5%
Source: Census data

At the 2021 census, the commune had a population of 3,521; of those, 70.29% were Romanians and 16.84% Roma.
