= Șercaia =

- Commune
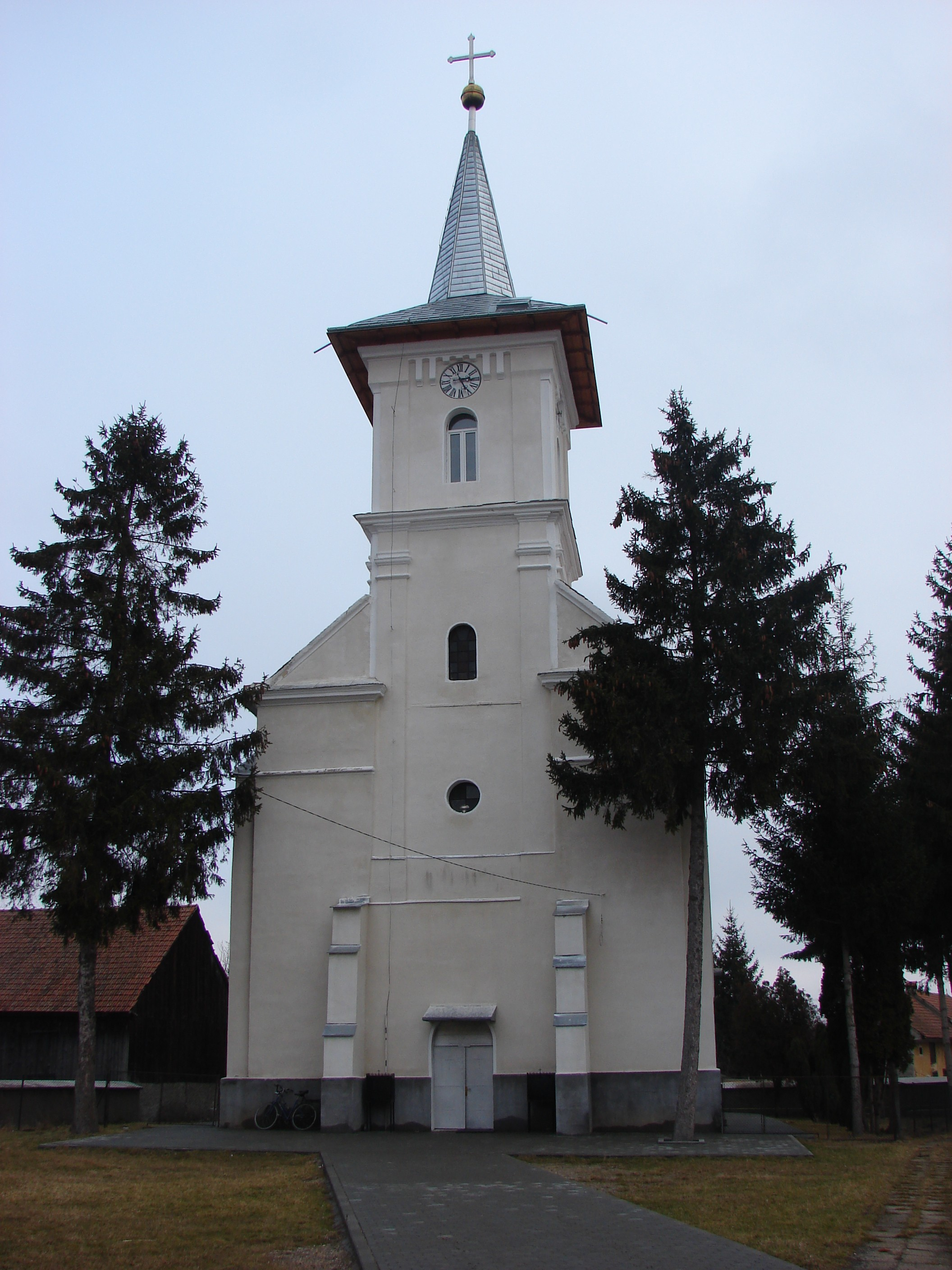
- Church in Vad village

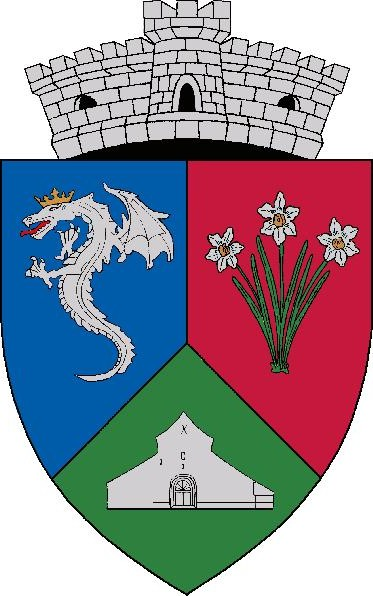
- Coat of arms

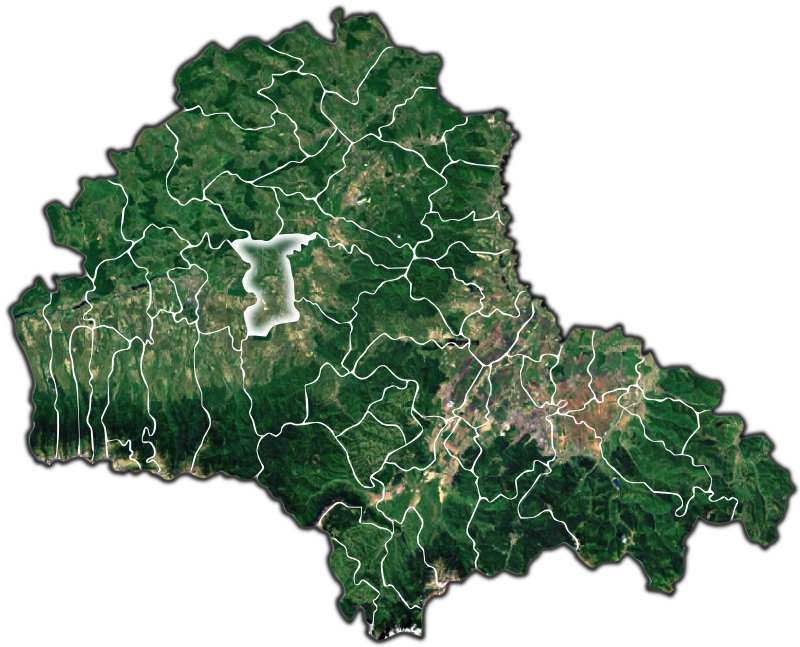
- Location within the county

- Location in Romania
- Coordinates: 45°50′N 25°8′E
- Country: Romania
- County: Brașov

Government
  - Mayor (2020–2024): Cristinel Paltin (PNL)
- Area: 92.64 km^{2} (35.77 sq mi)
- Elevation: 449 m (1,473 ft)
- Population (2021-12-01): 2,865
  - Density: 30.93/km^{2} (80.10/sq mi)
- Time zone: UTC+02:00 (EET)
  - Summer (DST): UTC+03:00 (EEST)
- Postal code: 507195
- Area code: (+40) 02 68
- Vehicle reg.: BV
- Website: www.primaria-sercaia.ro

Șercaia (German: Schirkanyen; Hungarian: Sárkány; Turkish: Saruhan) is a commune in Brașov County, Transylvania, Romania. It is composed of three villages: Hălmeag (Halmagen; Halmágy; Halmaç), Șercaia, and Vad (Waadt, Waden; Vád). The Hungarian name means "dragon".

== Geography ==
The commune is located in the Burzenland ethnographic area, in the central part of the county, 14 km (8.7 mi) east of Făgăraș and 53 km (33 mi) northwest of the county seat, Brașov. The river Șercaia (a left affluent of the Olt) flows south to north through the commune.

Șercaia is situated on European route E68, which connects Brașov to Szeged in Hungary. National Road DN73A runs from Predeal to Șercaia, going along the way through the towns of Râșnov and Zărnești.

The commune also has a small train station that serves the CFR Line 200, which runs from Brașov to Curtici, on the Hungarian border.

== Demographics ==
Historical population
Year	Pop.	±%
1850	3,973	—
1920	4,266	+7.4%
1966	3,756	−12.0%
2002	3,050	−18.8%
2011	2,822	−7.5%
2021	2,865	+1.5%
Source: Census data

At the 2011 census, the commune had 2,822 inhabitants, of which 81.33% were Romanians, 10.31% Hungarians, 4% Roma, and 0.8% Germans. At the 2021 census, Șercaia had a population of 2,865; of those, 69.9% were Romanians, 16.09% Roma, and 4.54% Hungarians.

== Natives ==
- Augustin Bunea (1857–1909), priest and historian
- Alexandru Ciurcu (1854–1922), inventor
- Katalin Varga (1802–aft. 1852), leader of the Transylvanian Miners' Movement

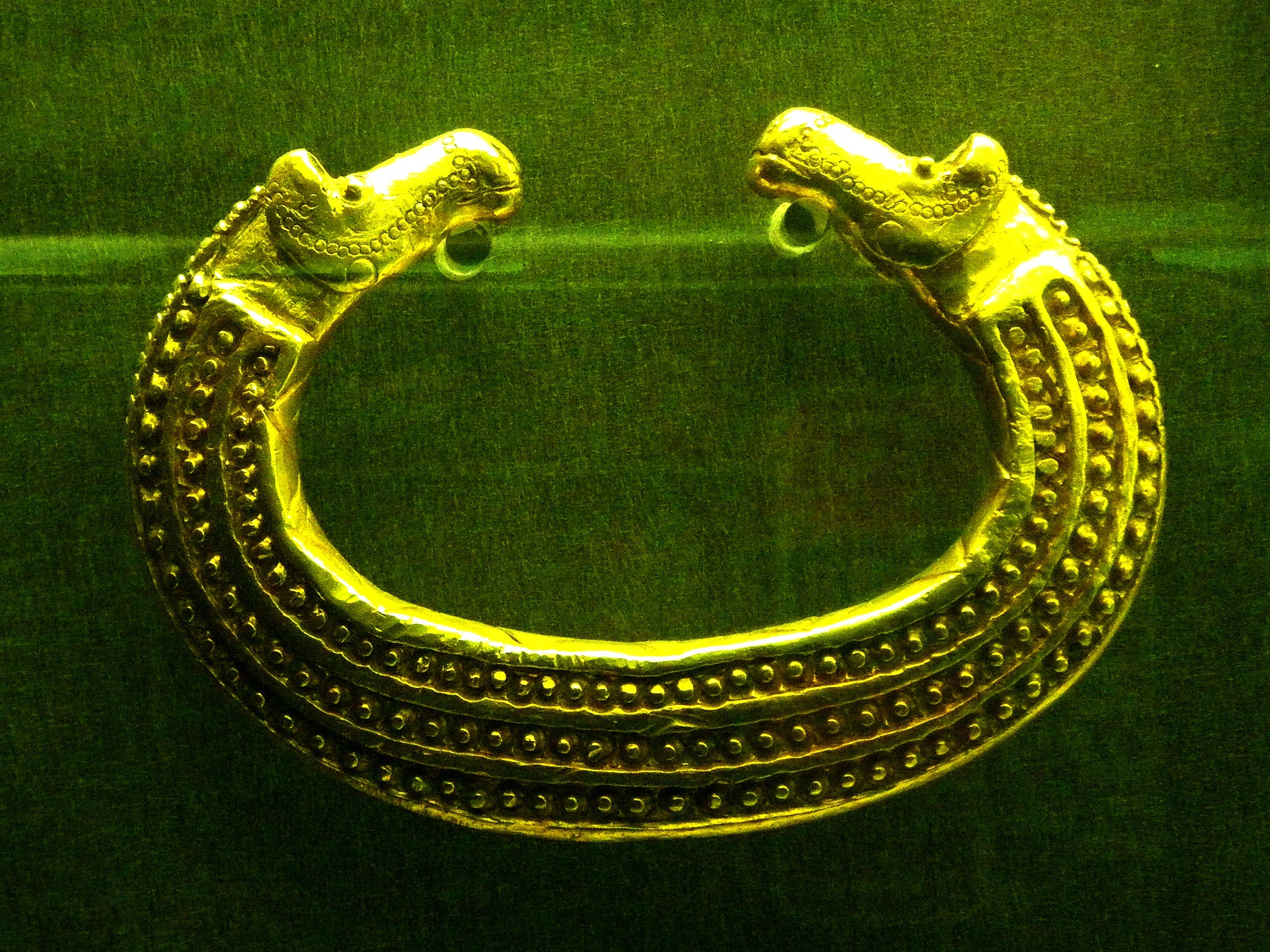
Dacian gold bracelet with horse heads from Vad-Făgăraș at Kunsthistorisches Museum, Vienna.
