= Entry of the Theotokos into the Temple Church =

Entry of the Theotokos into the Temple Church may refer to several Orthodox churches:

== Romania ==
- Entry of the Theotokos into the Temple Church, Bistrița
- Entry of the Theotokos into the Temple Church, Focșani
- Ovidenia Armeni Church, Focșani
- Entry of the Theotokos into the Temple Church, Iași
- Entry of the Theotokos into the Temple Church, Sighișoara
