= Church of the Holy Archangels, Satulung =

Orthodox church in Săcele, Romania

Coordinates: 45°37′00″N 25°42′17″E

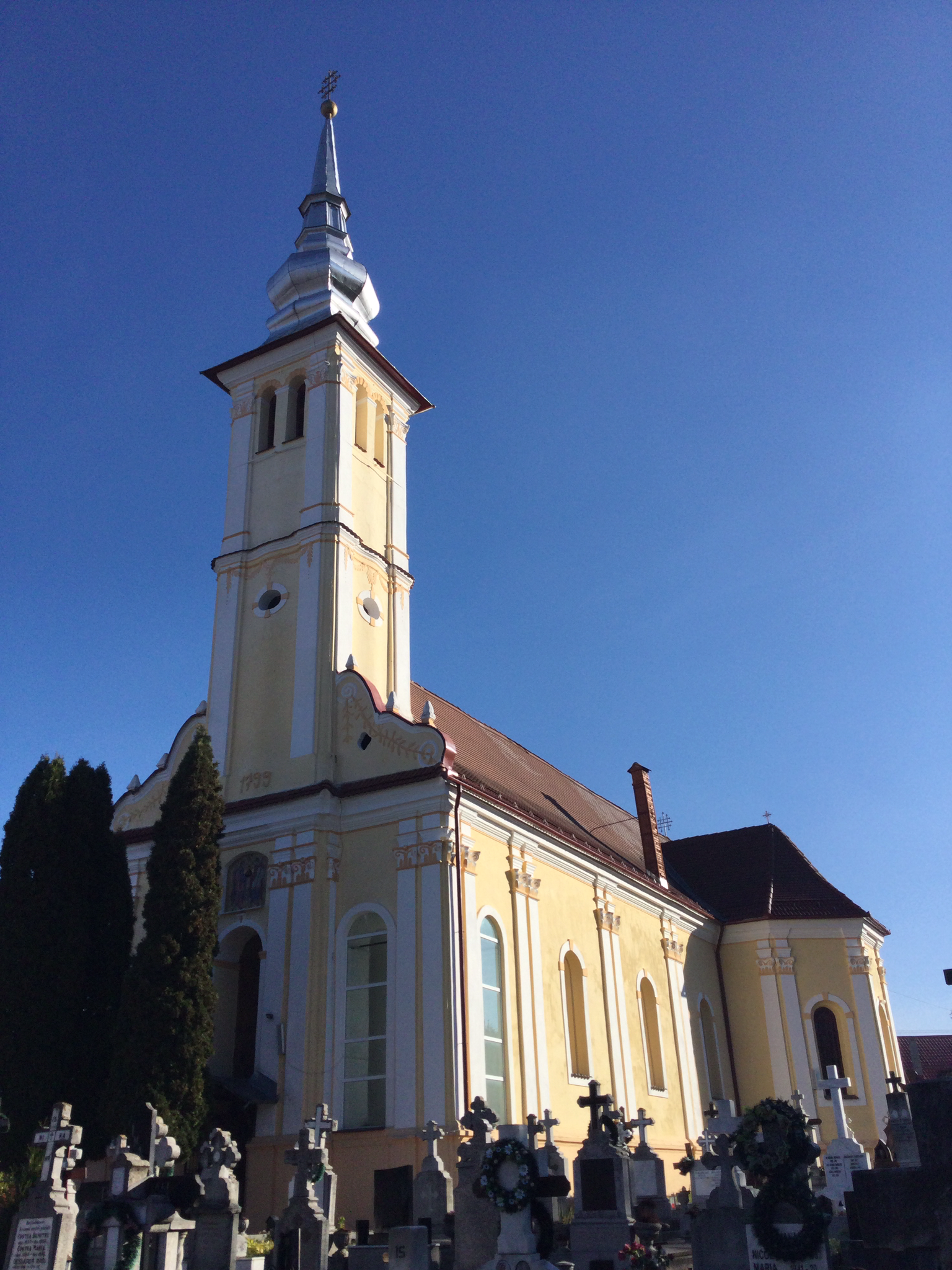
Church of the Holy Archangels

The Church of the Holy Archangels is a Romanian Orthodox Church located on Victor Jinga Street, Săcele, Romania. Located in Satulung, a former village that is now a district of Săcele, it is dedicated to the Archangels Michael and Gabriel.

A wooden church stood on the site as early as the 17th century. The present church was built between 1794 and 1799 with contributions from the local mocan shepherds, without help from the government. The church and its affiliated school were ready in spring, and dedicated in the summer of 1799. Earlier, in 1796, Bishop Gerasim Adamović had blessed the site of the future altar. Gradually, locals also donated censers, candelabra, candleholders and vestments. They also paid for four bells. During World War I, the Austro-Hungarian Army requisitioned three of them for war materiel, leaving only the large one; the three were replaced after the war.

The church has a trefoil plan adopted from Wallachia. However, the spatial arrangement, based on cylindrical ceilings of stone, brick and wood, is characteristic of Transylvania. The western entrance has a porch, initially open but later closed with large windows, to protect the structure from the elements. The narrow spire, flanked by tympana, rises above the porch. While the latter incorporates the Brâncovenesc style, the spire and the spacious interior point to the Transylvanian Baroque, as does the rich stucco facade decoration of double pilasters and composite capitols, later degraded by unskilled workers.

The painting is in Byzantine style fresco. A stone inscription above the door indicates a date of 1803, and the artists’ names. The large iconostasis icons are from the same year. The interior painting was restored in 1994–1999. The church museum holds several religious books from 1849 to 1858, a Gospel Book from 1829 and a collection of 18th-century icons. The parish has two cemeteries: one surrounding the church, with a brick wall; and another nearby. The two-room church school ran until 1919, when the Romanian state took over. In the interwar period, one room was used as a library with over 3000 books, while the other hosted a bank. Repaired in 1975 and 2006, they now hold the church museum.

The church is listed as a historic monument by Romania's Ministry of Culture, as are the old school and the wall.

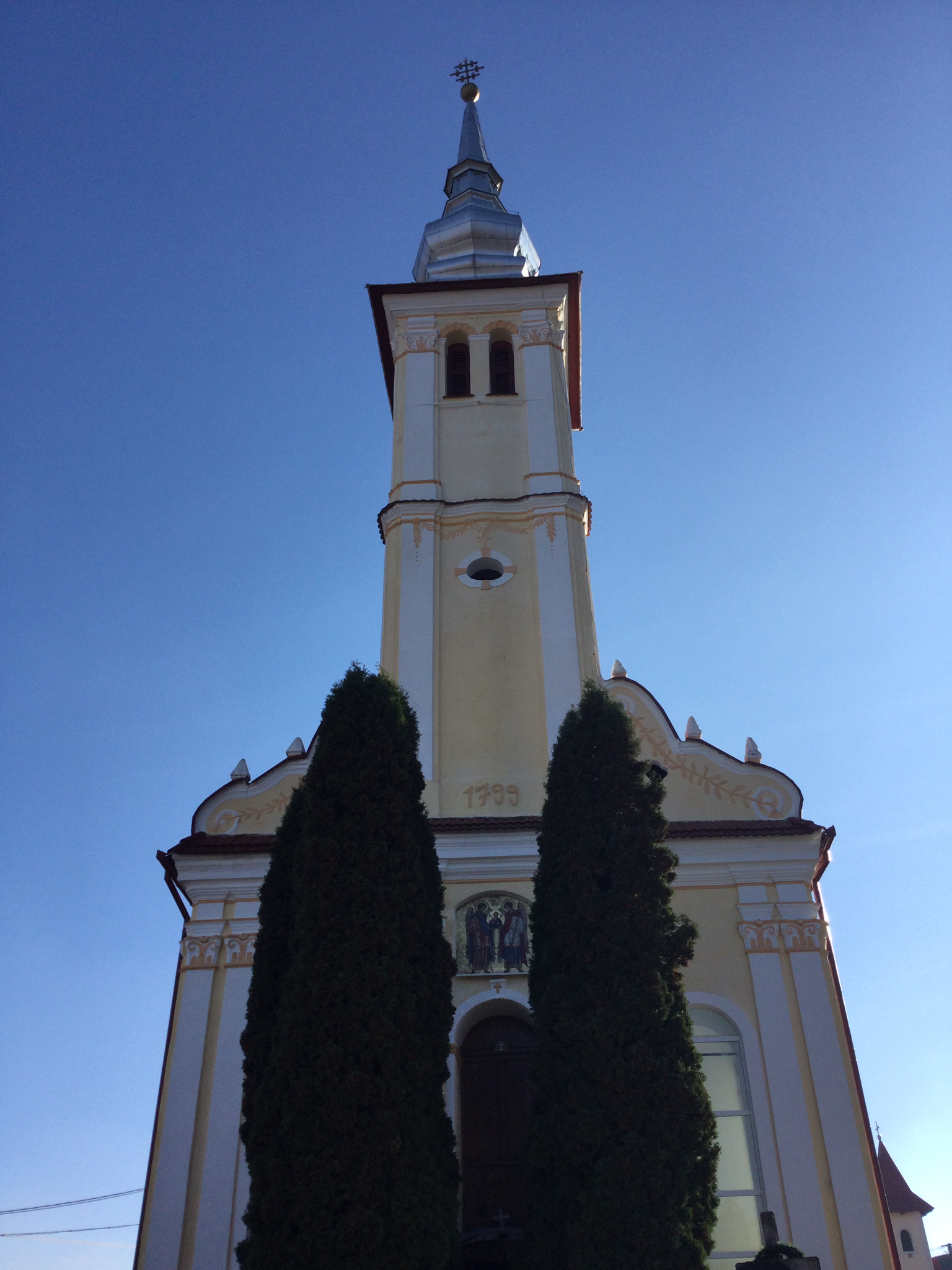
Facade

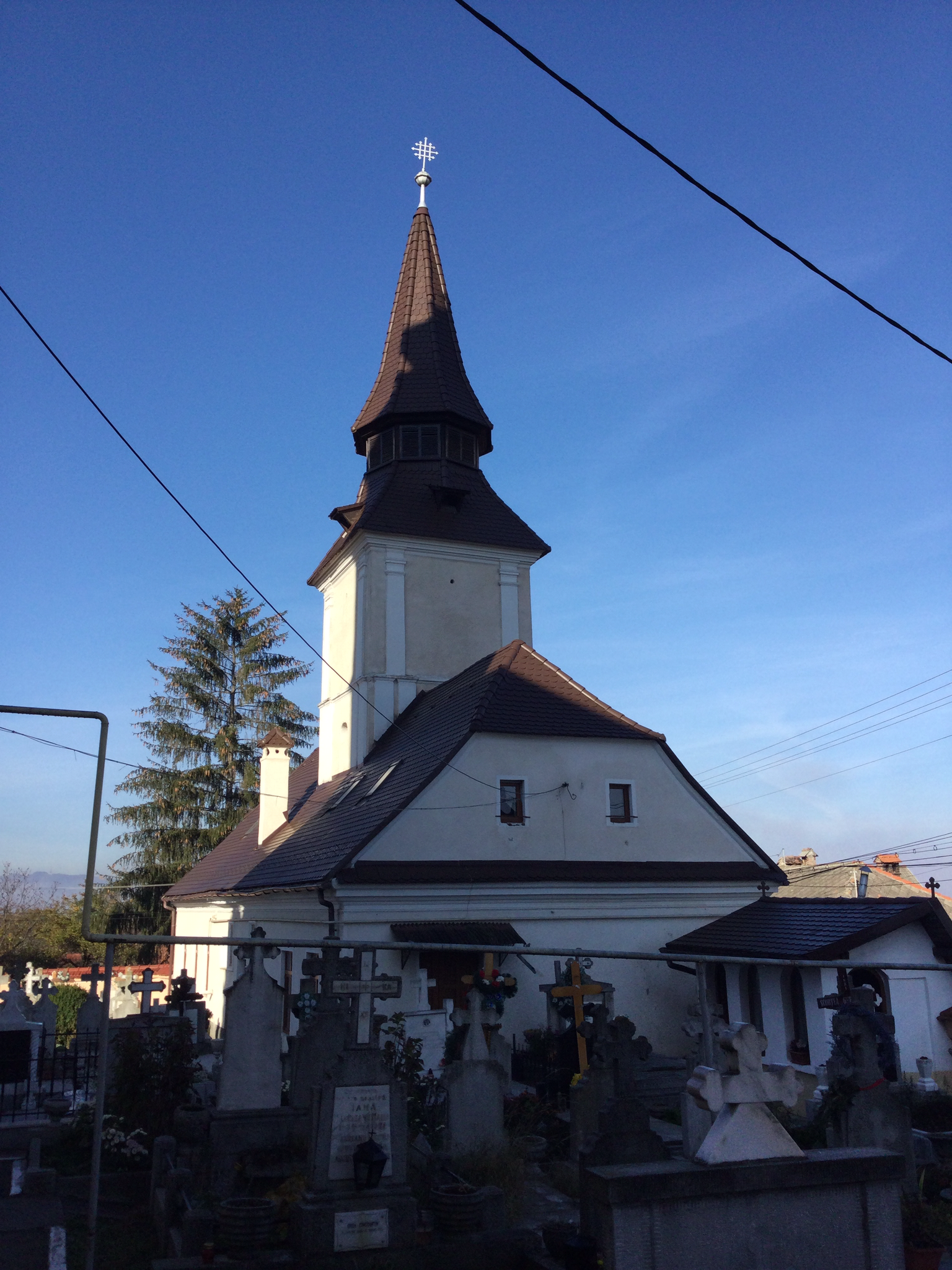
Old school

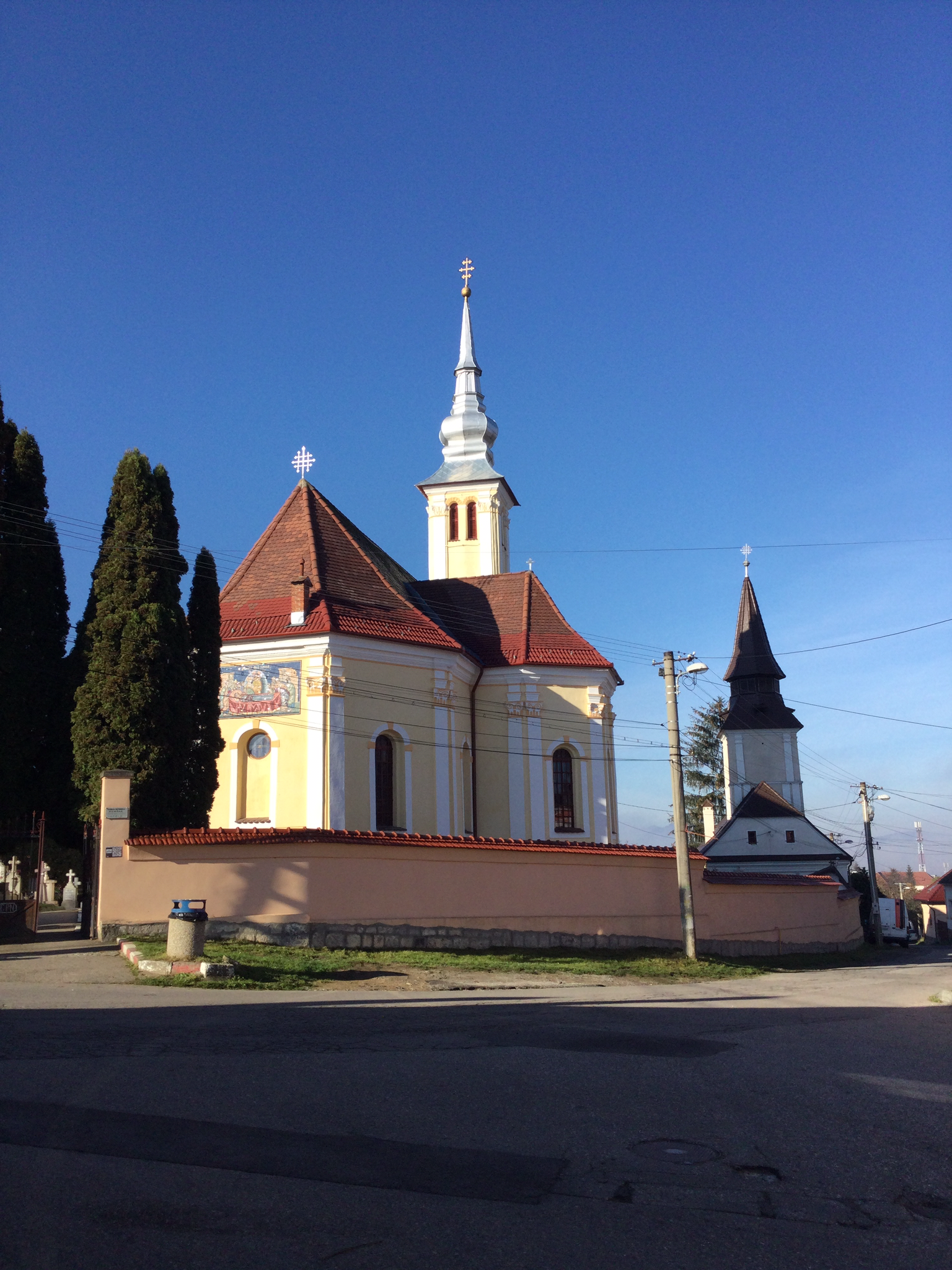
Rear

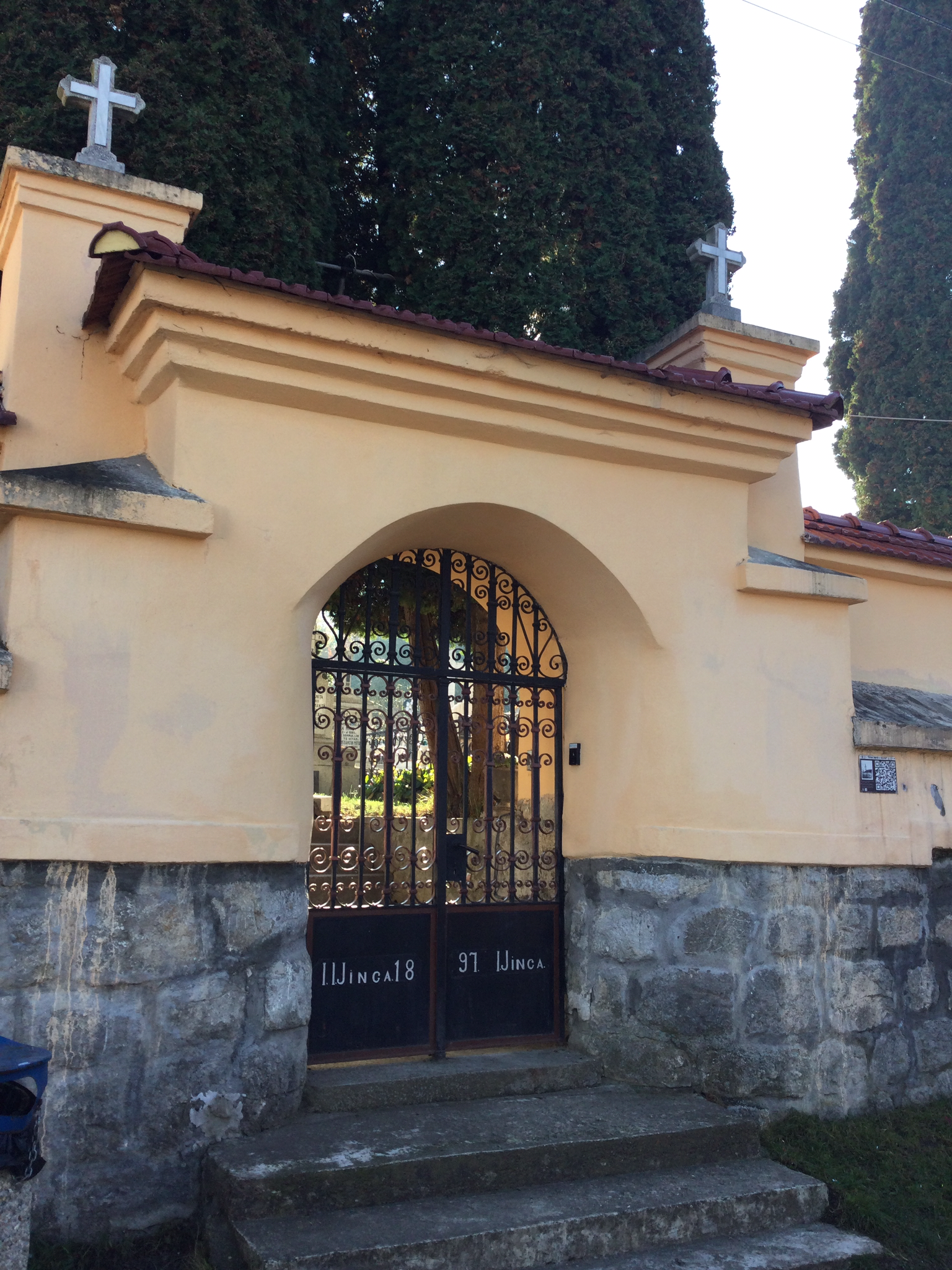
Gate
