= Entry of the Theotokos into the Temple Church, Sighișoara =

Orthodox church in Sighișoara, Romania

Coordinates: 46°13′13″N 24°46′56″E

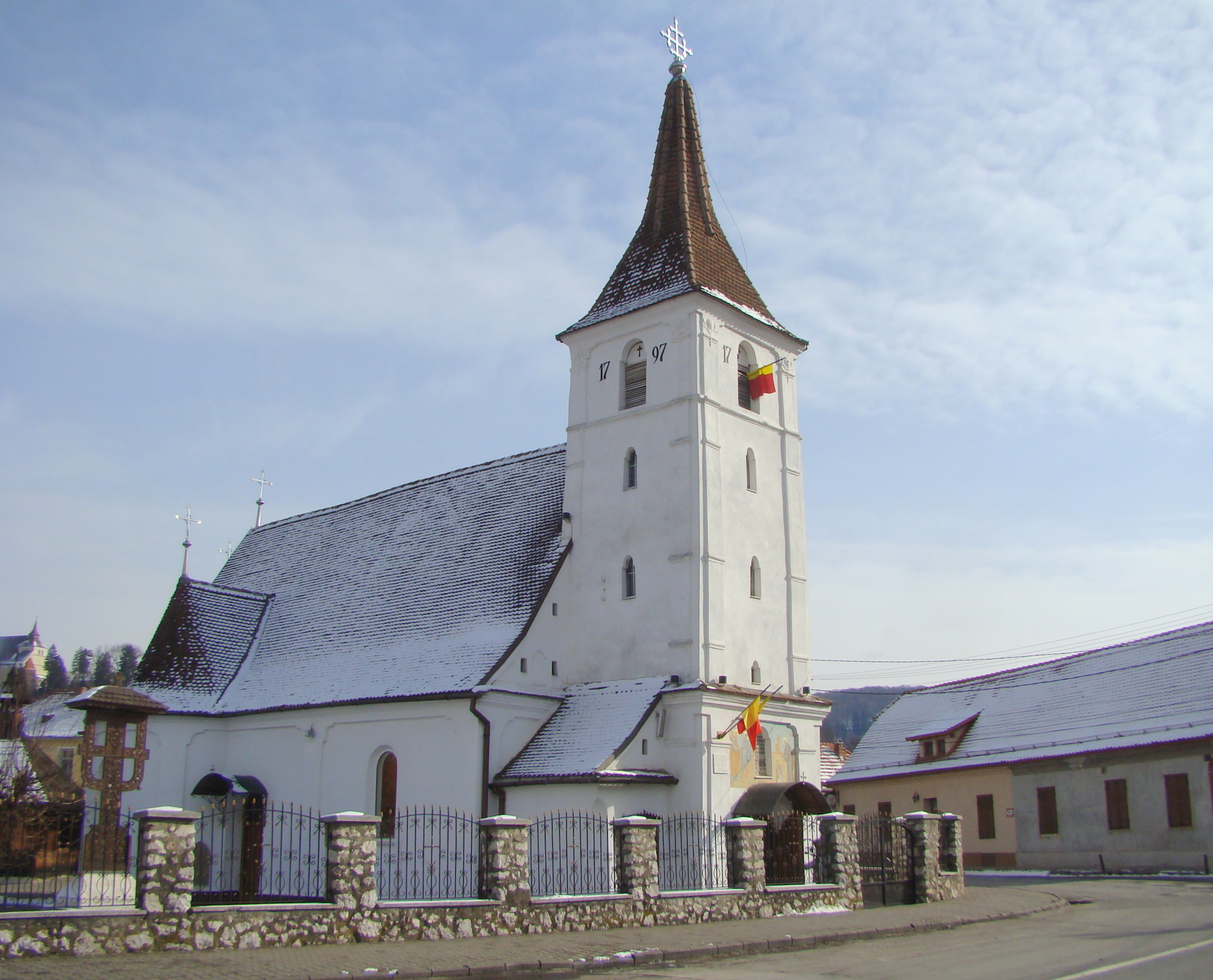
Entry of the Theotokos into the Temple Church

The Entry of the Theotokos into the Temple Church (Romanian: Biserica Intrarea Maicii Domnului în Biserică) is a Romanian Orthodox church located at 22 Ecaterina Varga Street, Sighișoara, Romania. It is dedicated to the Entry of the Theotokos into the Temple.

In the 18th century, the Romanians of Sighișoara were not recognized by the local authorities and did not have their own church. According to Zaharia Boiu, some 120 families converted an abandoned hayloft into a church at mid-century, with priests coming from neighboring villages to hold services. In 1775, a priest from Săcele founded a parish. He built a three-room stone parish house on land donated by Joseph II, with the front room serving as a church from 1780. A six-armed candelabra, still preserved, was carved for church use.

The stone church began to be built in 1780, with the main part finished in 1788. The altar dates to 1789, while the spire was completed in 1797. An inscription was placed above the entrance in 1805. The cross-shaped church is 25 by 8 meters, the spire rising to 21 meters. The iconostasis was carved and painted in 1818 by a Brașov artist. The murals date to 1974. Bishop Vasile Moga dedicated the church in 1822. The church owns a number of rare objects, including a Gospel Book printed at Bucharest in 1760, a silvered brass censer, a gilt silver chalice and an icon of the Theotokos.

The church is listed as a historic monument by Romania's Ministry of Culture and Religious Affairs.
