= Turcheș Church =

Historic Romanian Orthodox church in Brașov, Romania

Coordinates: 45°36′46″N 25°40′49″E

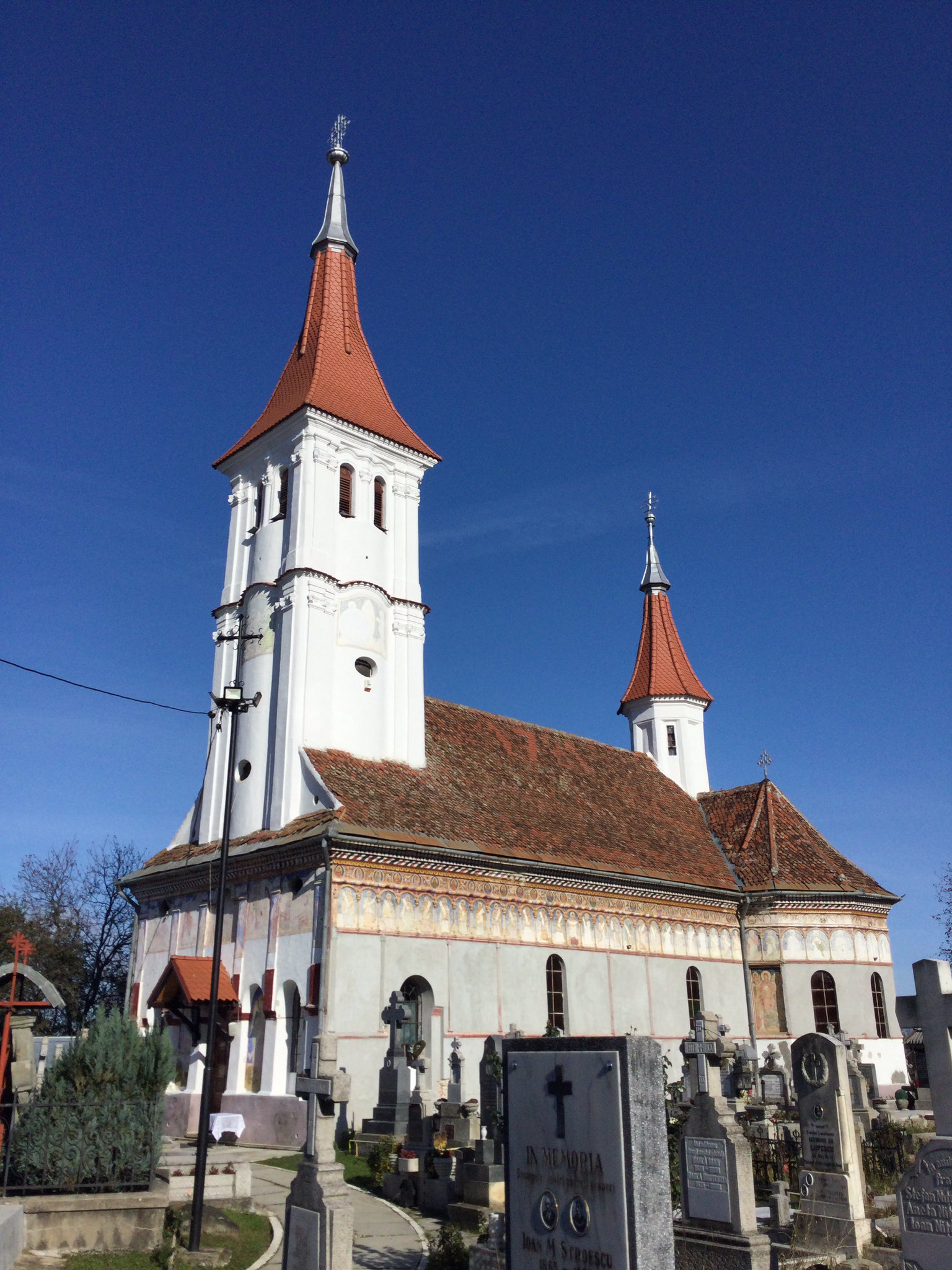
- Turcheș Church
- Location: 227–232 Ilie Minea Street, Săcele, Romania
- Denomination: Romanian Orthodox

Architecture
- Functional status: Parish church
- Heritage designation: Historic monument
- Groundbreaking: 1781
- Completed: 1783

Specifications
- Length: 26.31 m (86.3 ft)
- Width: 14.55 m (47.7 ft)

The Turcheș Church is a Romanian Orthodox church located at 227–232 Ilie Minea Street, Săcele, Romania. Located in Turcheș, a former village that is now a district of Săcele, it is dedicated to the Dormition of the Theotokos.

The local Orthodox community had a wooden church by 1650, when it requested permission to carry out repairs. The 1781 Patent of Toleration allowed for stone Orthodox churches to be built in the Habsburg monarchy. Taking advantage of the new freedom, the Romanians of Turcheș asked and received the right to build a new stone church, citing the fact that their wooden church, some two centuries old, lay in ruin. Construction began in 1781, as recorded above the nave entrance, and was completed in 1783.

The cruciform church is 26.31 meters long and 14.55 meters wide. The large bell tower, which reaches a height of 47 meters, was begun in 1821. Entry into the churchyard is beneath this structure, which completed the powerful brick surrounding wall. The interior and exterior of the church are attractively painted by an unknown artist, in the style of the Western Moldavian monasteries. The work was covered in a layer of lime in 1877 and uncovered in 1939.

The church owns a significant number of valuable objects, including a 1200 kilogram bell from 1837, an antimins donated by Andrei Șaguna, an 1815 epitaphios, a 1787 silver tabernacle, a large cross from 1881, chalices (1796, 1838, 1840), silver candleholders (1770-1771), three brass candelabra (1787), silver Tetraevangelion cover (1822), silver vessels for incense and holy oil (1822). The 1812-1815 iconostasis is particularly valuable. There is a large collection of old icons and books. The ktetors are recorded in the altar, while a stone inscription describes the founding. A cross, inscribed in Romanian Cyrillic, marks the site of the old wooden church's altar.

The parish cemetery surrounds the church. It is nearly round in shape and covers 3000 square meters. In 1994, a further 5000 square meters were added. A parish school operated from 1821 to 1873 in the two little rooms flanking the tower. In 1874, the school moved to a new building, which became a state school in 1920. The church is listed as a historic monument by Romania's Ministry of Culture and Religious Affairs, as are the old school, tower and wall, assigned completion dates of 1837.

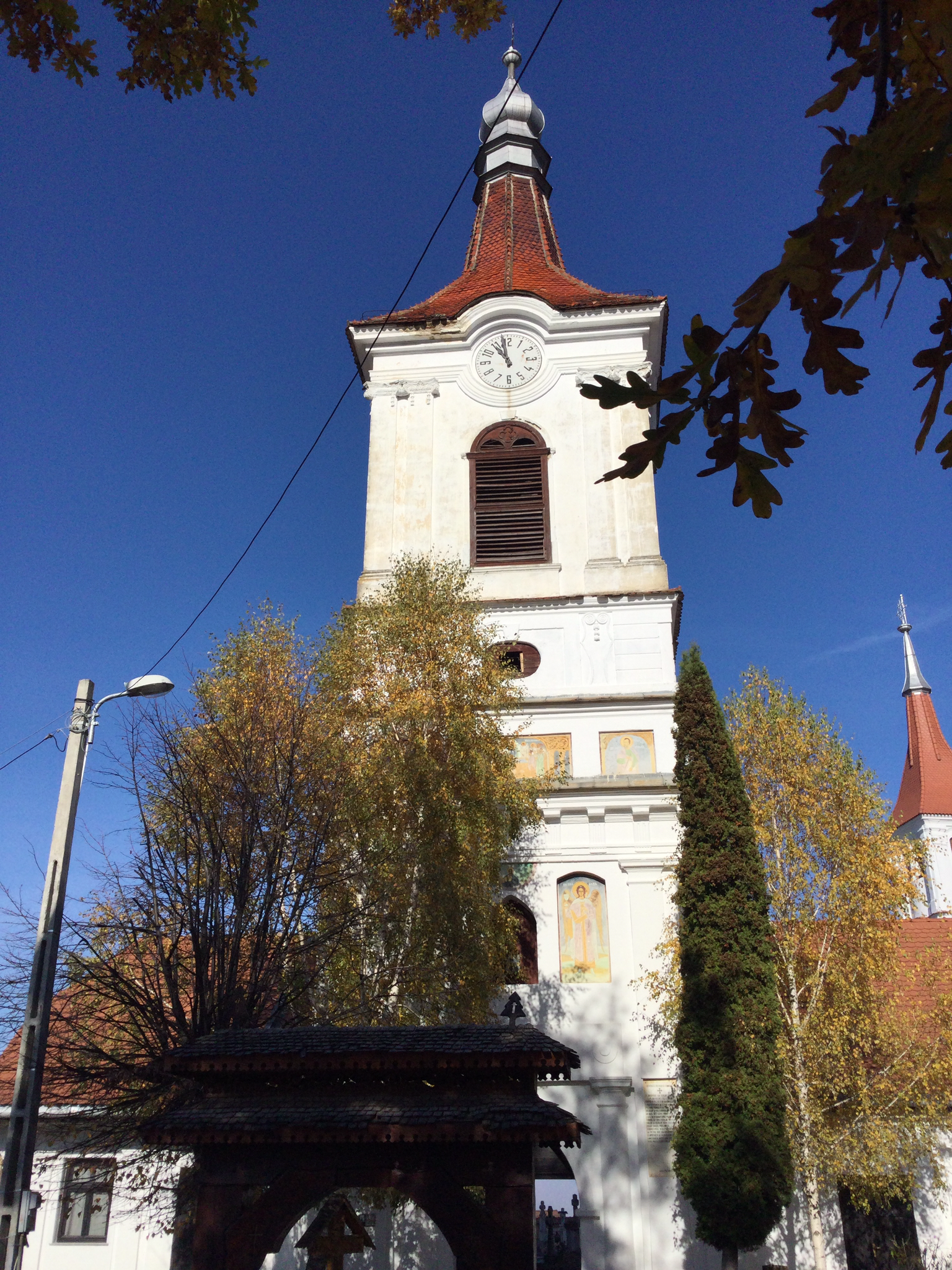
Bell tower

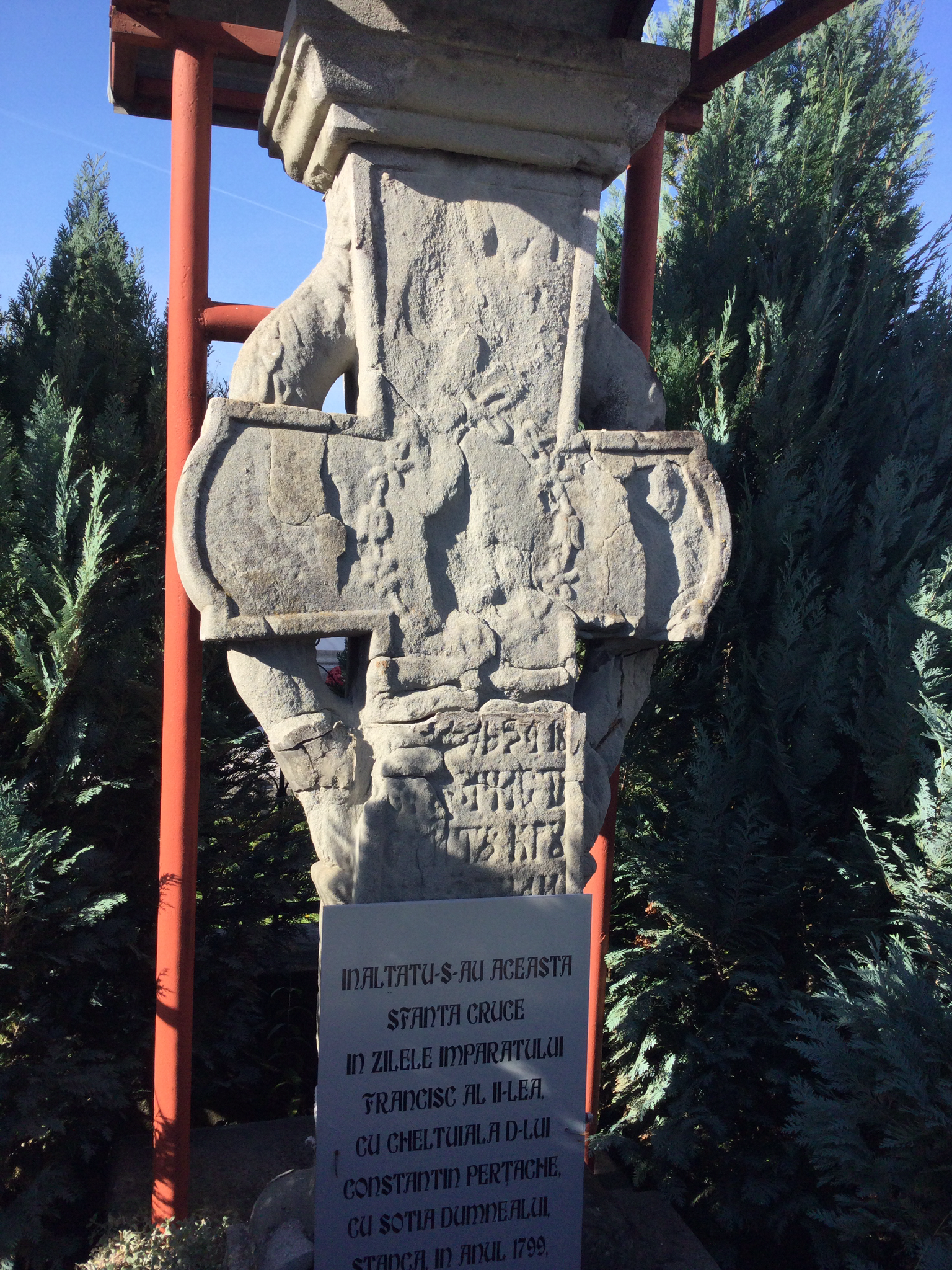
Old cross

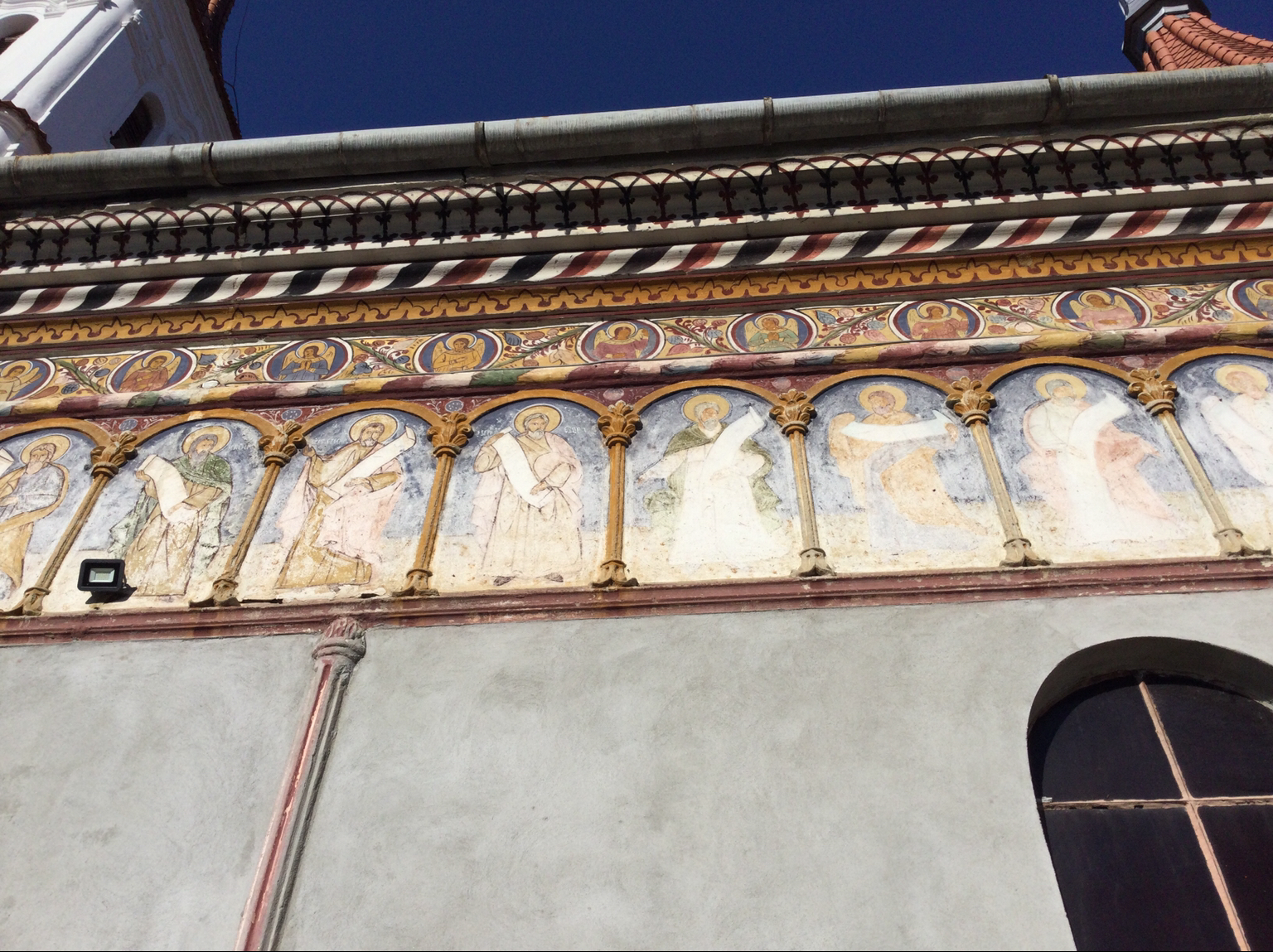
Artwork detail
