= Cernatu Church =

Orthodox church in Săcele, Romania

Coordinates: 45°36′54″N 25°41′37″E

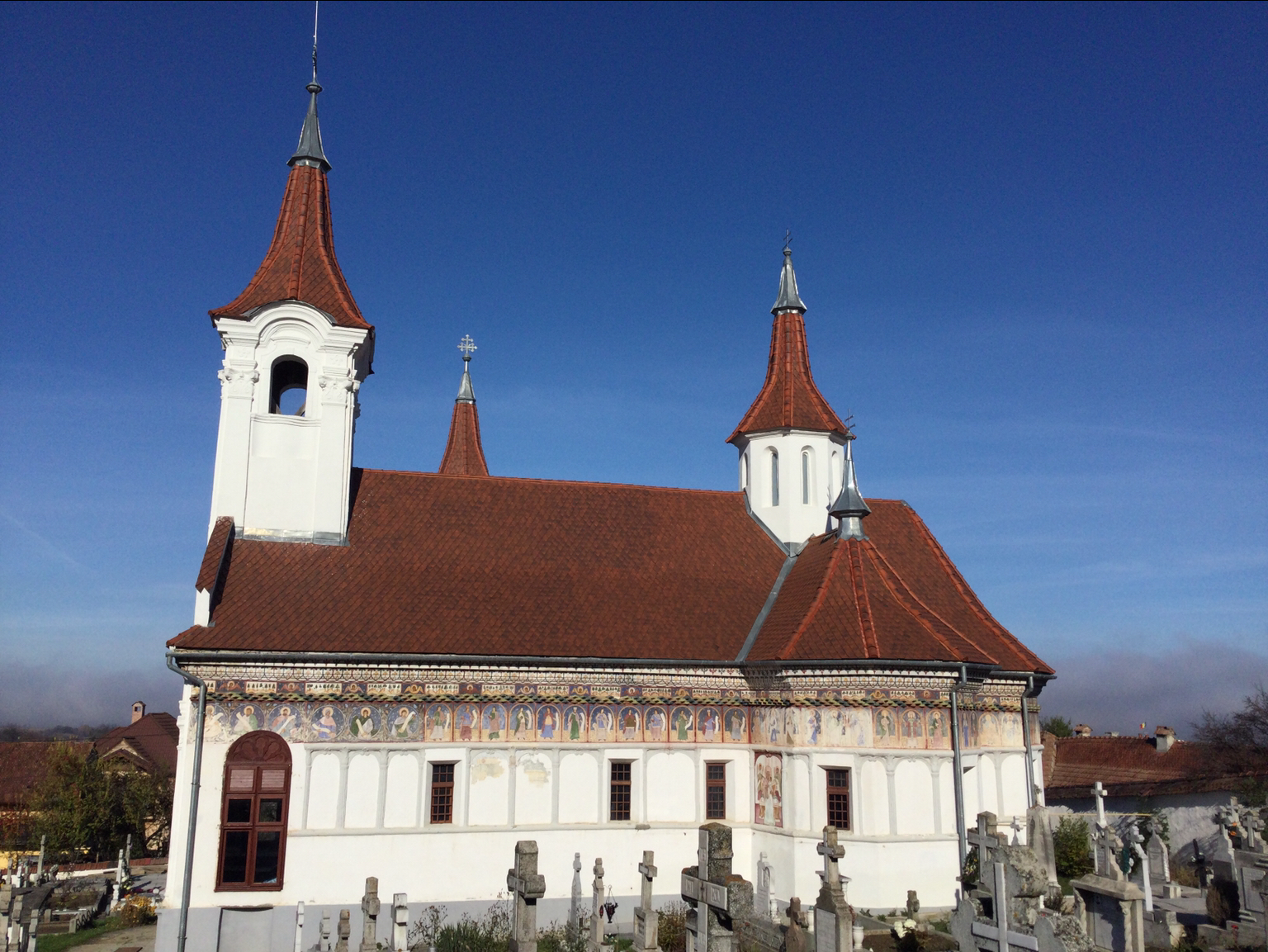
Cernatu Church

The Cernatu Church is a Romanian Orthodox church located on Bisericii Române Street, Săcele, Romania. Located in Cernatu, a former village that is now a district of Săcele, it is dedicated to Saint Nicholas.

According to a census of 1760-1762, the Romanian Orthodox community of Cernatu had no priest or church. It is likely they built a wooden church soon after, as a 1770 document mentions its being in need of repairs. In 1779, the parish wrote a letter in Romanian Cyrillic to the authorities of the Hapsburg Monarchy for permission to build a stone church. The favorable response came in Latin the following year, shortly before the Patent of Toleration was issued. The parishioners purchased land in 1783. No stone inscription plaque survives, so information about construction and ktetors is lacking. However, the church was likely also completed in 1783, the date carved into the stone vessel holding water for the priest to wash his hands.

The stone and brick church is shaped like a trefoil cross, with two apses. The church is 23 meters long, 8.5 meters wide and 10 meters high from foundation to roof. The walls are a meter thick. The interior is divided into altar, nave and narthex with porch. The floor is of square stone blocks, except in the altar, where it is made of fir beams. The semi-cylindrical brick nave ceiling is supported by four arcades, which also hold up the central, cylindrical spire. The windows are ogival. The spherical altar has a stone table. The wooden iconostasis features gilt decorations and icons in oil paint. The walls were repainted in 1994; only a small fragment of the original, Byzantine style frescoes survives.

The roof is made of tiles; it has been repaired once, in 1973. Above the windows on the exterior, there is a decorative row of bricks. Icons of saints, done in fresco by anonymous artists, surround the church on the outside; part of these have been effaced by exposure. The nearly square parish cemetery surrounds the church. It covers 3000 square meters and has a brick wall. The church is listed as a historic monument by Romania's Ministry of Culture and Religious Affairs, as are the bell tower and wall.

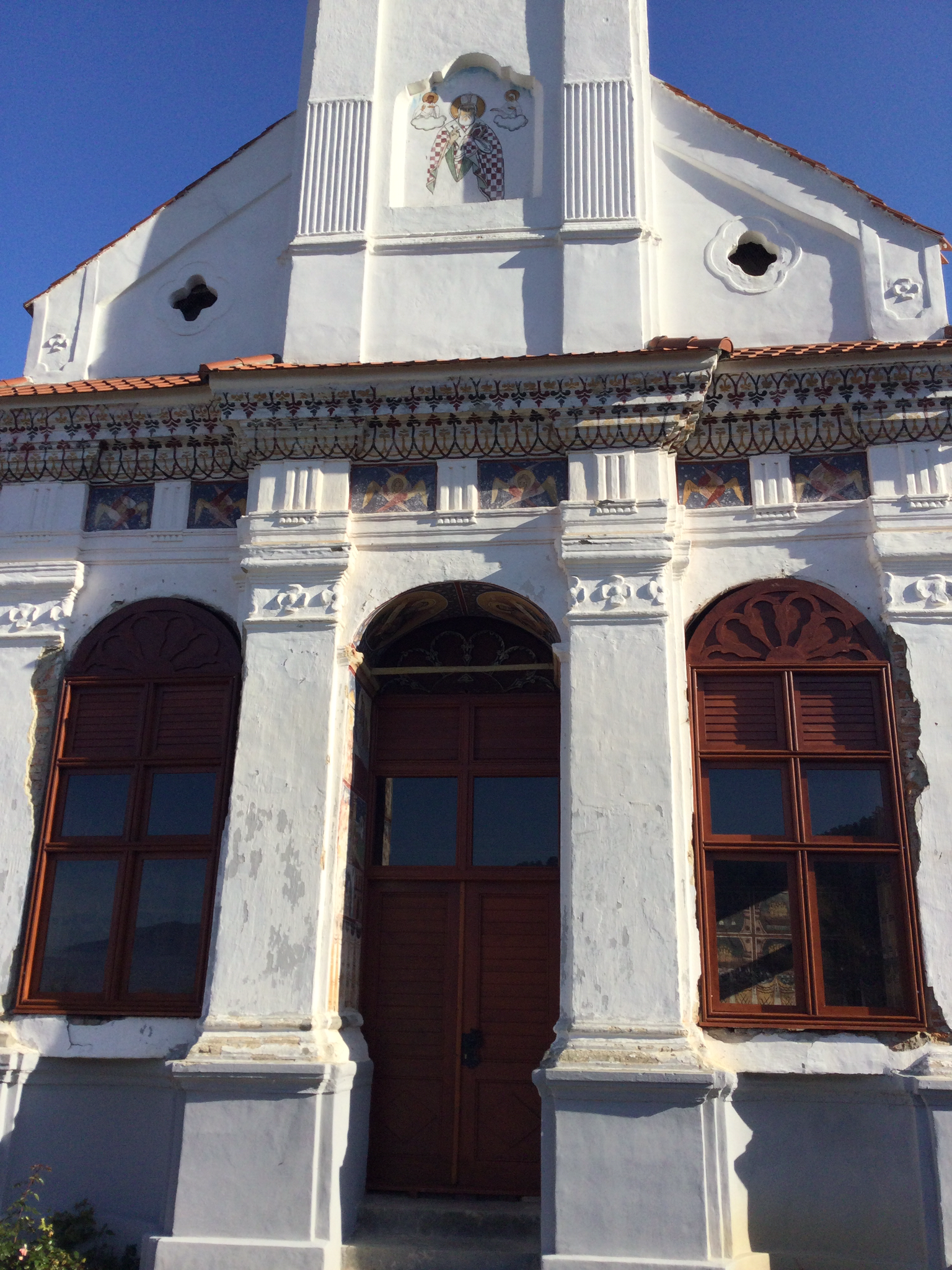
Entrance

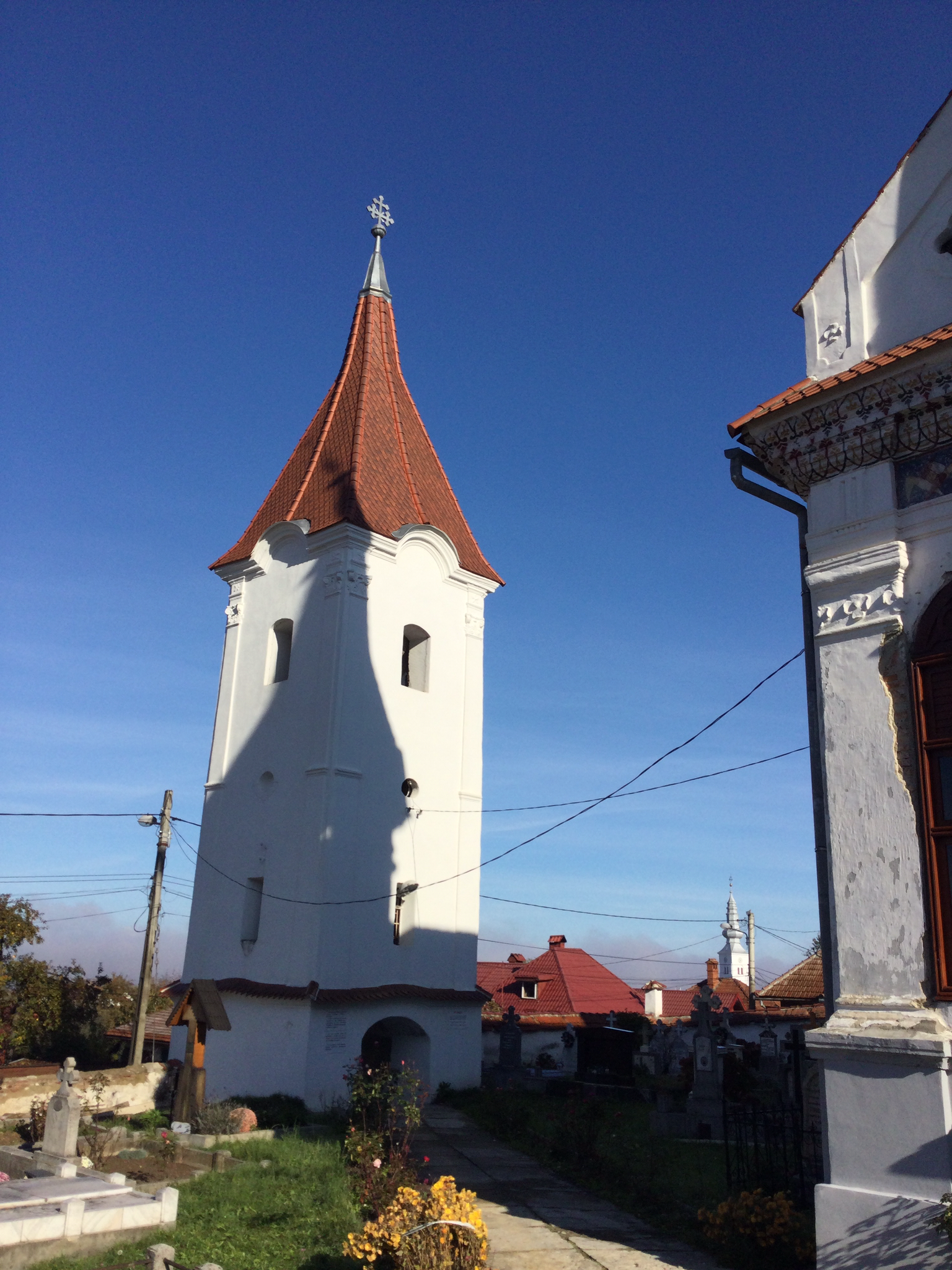
Bell tower

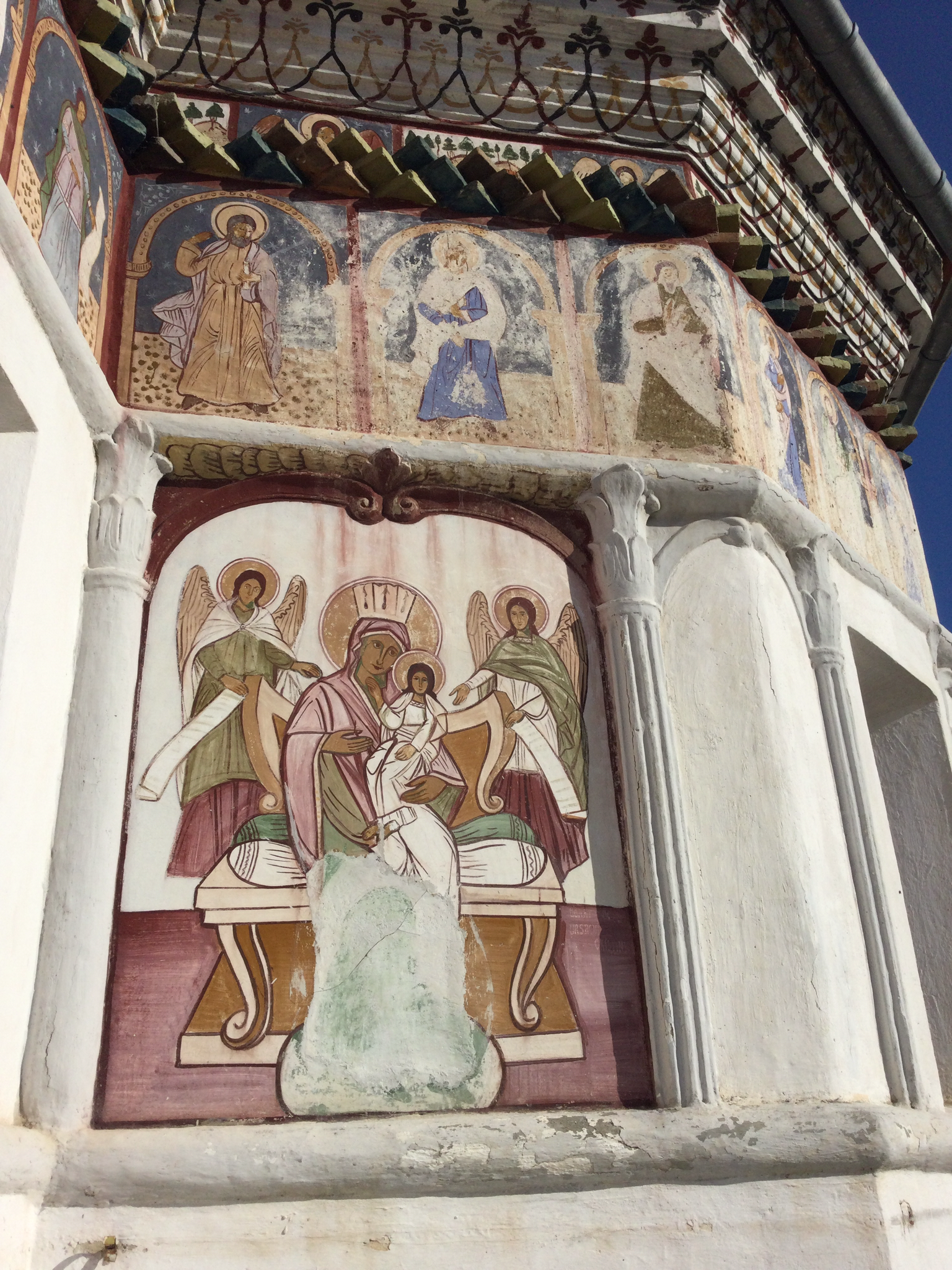
Artwork detail
