= Săcele =

Săcele Négyfalu
- Municipality
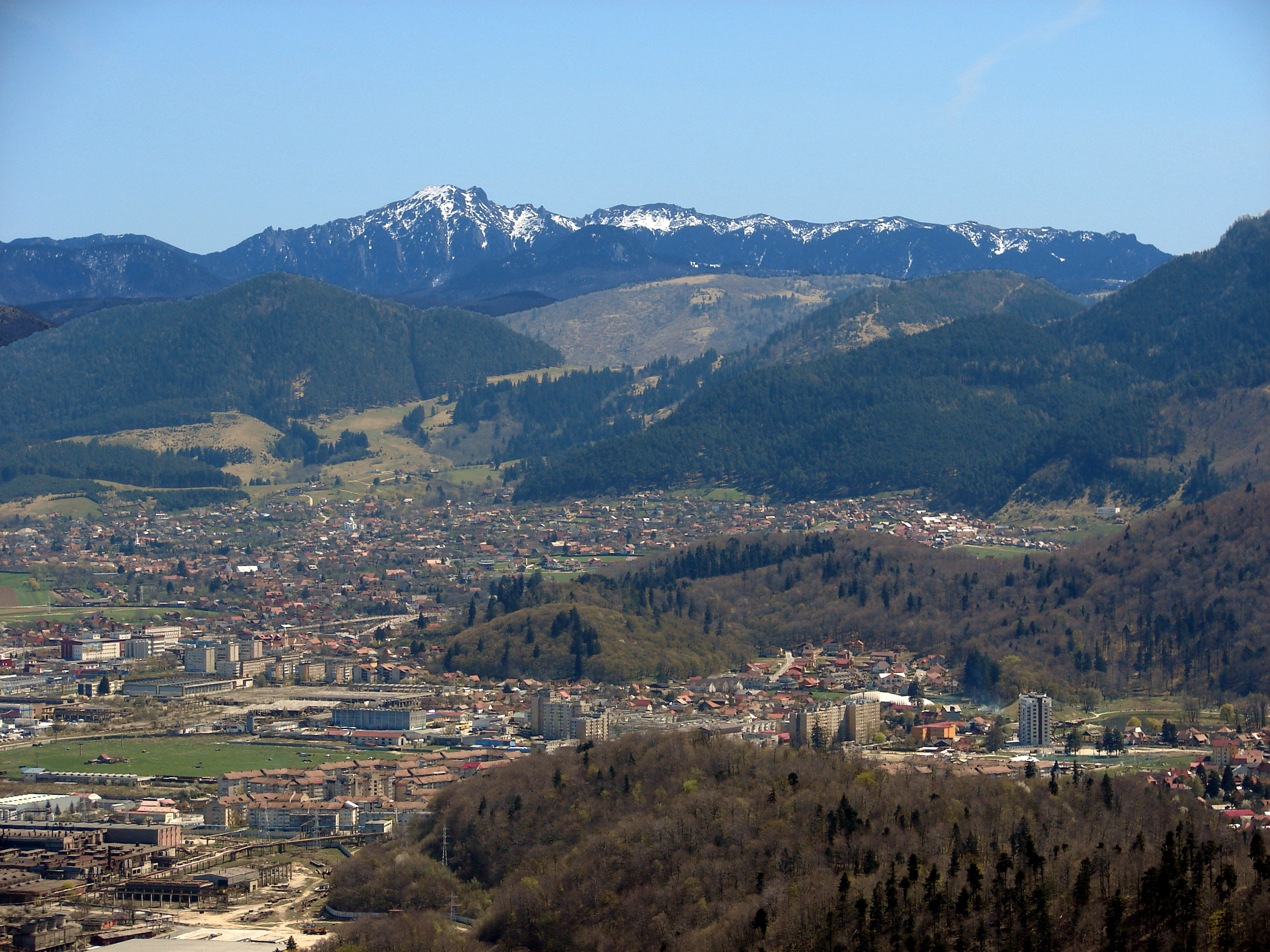
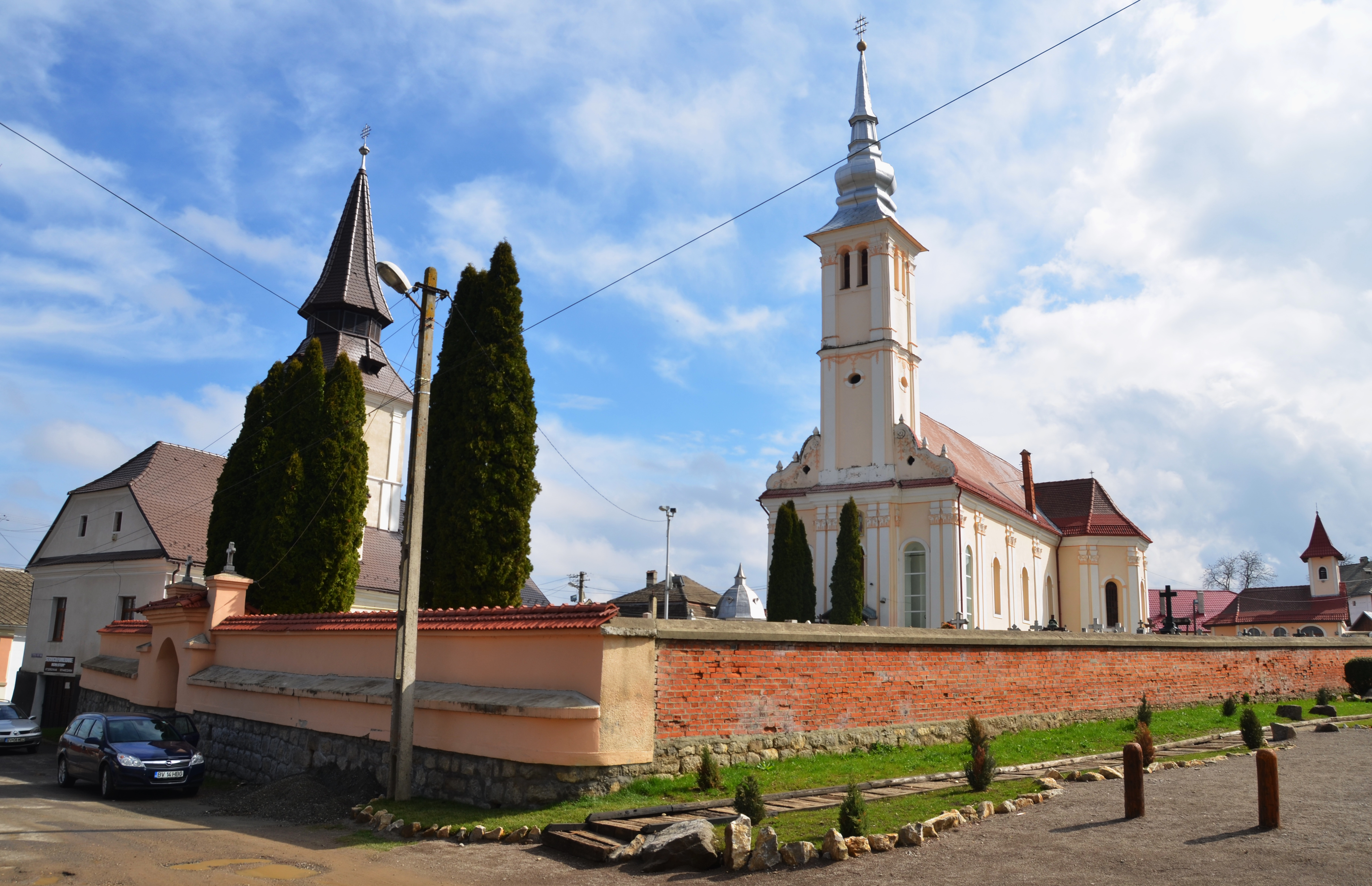
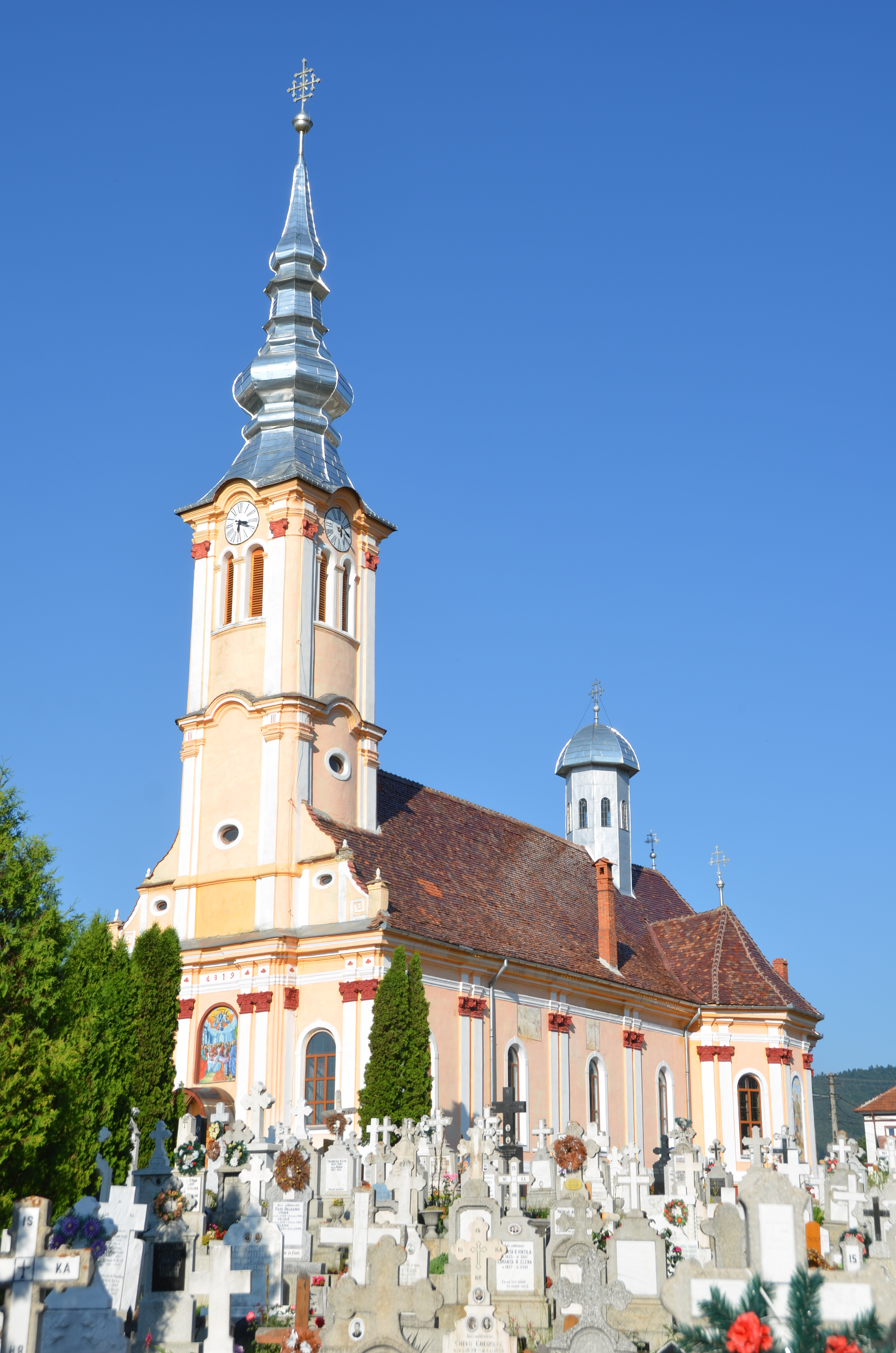
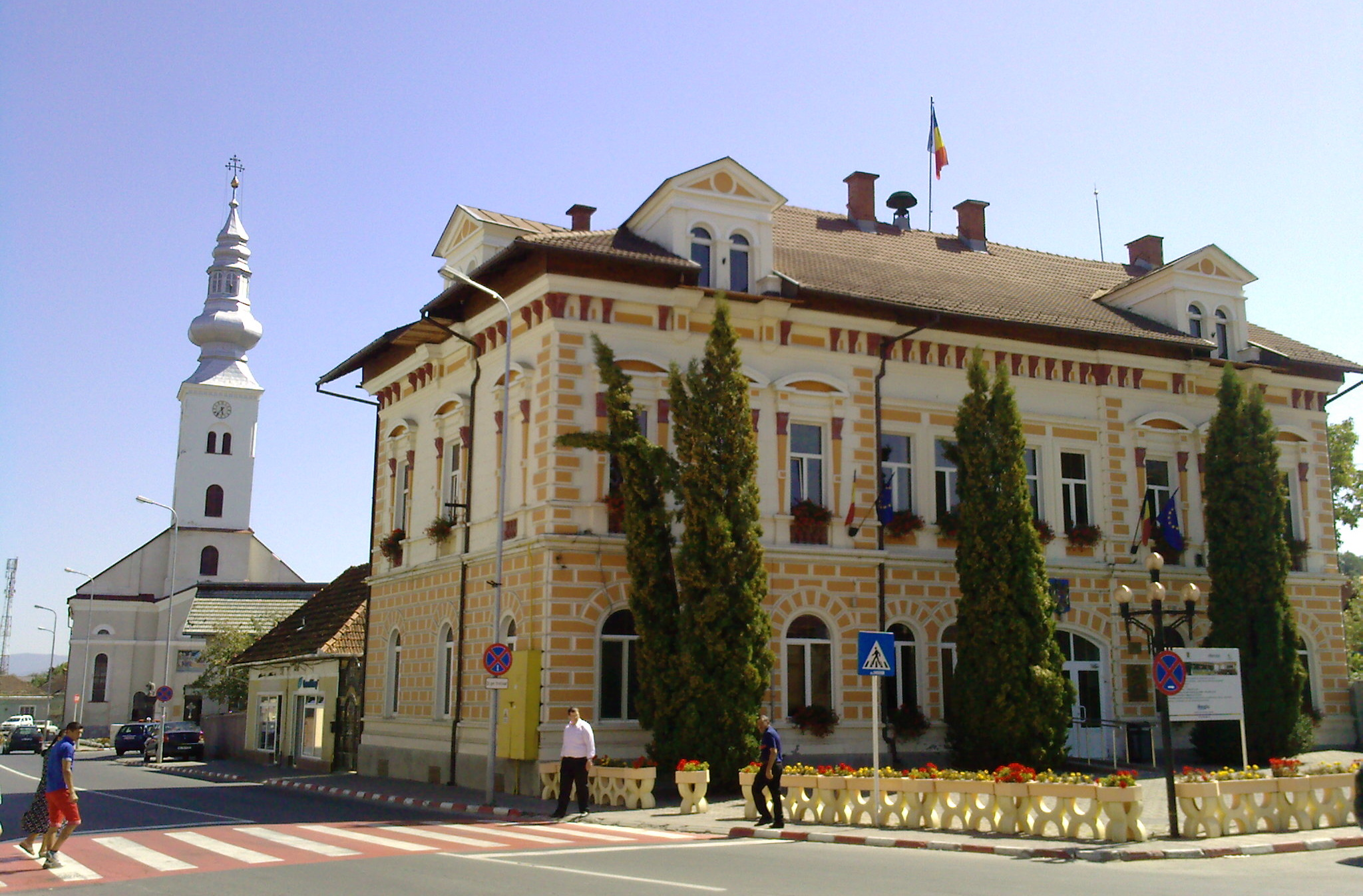
- View of Săcele near the Ciucaș Mountains “Sf. Arhangheli” Church Ensemble Dormition of Theotokos Church City hall

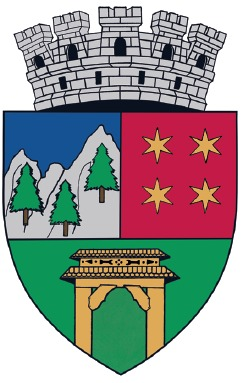
- Coat of arms

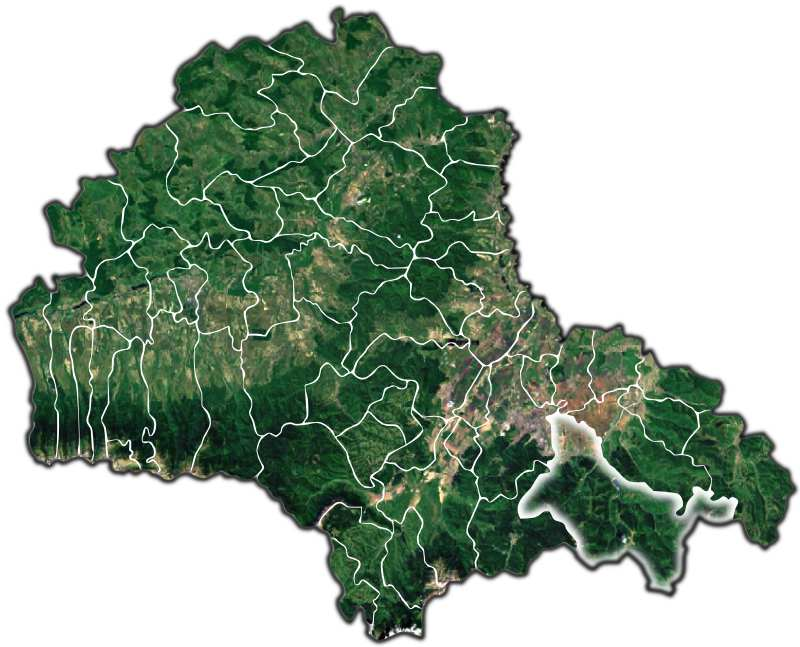
- Location in Brașov County

- Location in Romania
- Coordinates: 45°37′12″N 25°42′35″E
- Country: Romania
- County: Brașov

Government
  - Mayor (2024–2028): Virgil Popa (PSD)
- Area: 320 km^{2} (120 sq mi)
- Elevation: 717 m (2,352 ft)
- Lowest elevation: 650 m (2,130 ft)
- Population (2021-12-01): 30,920
  - Density: 97/km^{2} (250/sq mi)
- Time zone: UTC+02:00 (EET)
  - Summer (DST): UTC+03:00 (EEST)
- Postal code: 505600
- Area code: (+40) 02 68
- Vehicle reg.: BV
- Website: www.municipiulsacele.ro

Săcele (Romanian: [səˈtʃele]; German: Siebendörfer; Hungarian: Négyfalu, between 1950 and 2001 Szecseleváros) is a city in Brașov County, Romania, in the Burzenland area of southeastern Transylvania, with a population of 30,920 inhabitants in 2021. It is adjacent to the city of Brașov, its city centre being situated 15 kilometres (9.3 mi) away from downtown Brașov.

== History ==
The city since 1950 is composed of former villages which now form the main sectors: Baciu (Bácsfalu, Batschendorf), Turcheș (Türkös, Türkeschdorf), Cernatu (Csernátfalu, Zerndorf), and Satulung (Hosszúfalu, Langendorf). After the second half of the 11th century the villages were mentioned as "septem villae valacheles" (seven Vlach villages).

The first official mention of Săcele was a document issued on May 16, 1366, by the Hungarian King Louis I of Hungary in which he offers the area between the Timiș and Olt rivers to a trusted friend—Count Stanislav. Later it was under the Saxon management of Kronstadt (Brașov). Between the 13th and 14th centuries, an important Hungarian population settled in the region, marking the further development of the area.

During the Middle Ages three other villages belonged to the locality: Tărlungeni, Zizin, and Cărpiniș.

The Romanian name "Săcele" was first mentioned in a letter between the Wallachian Prince Vlad Călugărul (1482–1495) and the magistrate of Brașov. The Romanian etymology of "Săcele" is from "sătucele" meaning "small villages".

The German name was "Siebendörfen" which means "seven villages" and which is close to the Hungarian name "Hétfalu" or "Négyfalu". See also Seven Villages.

The inhabitants were the Mocani—local shepherds. They are mentioned in a few official documents and appear to have owned thousands of sheep, the villages being among the wealthiest in the area. They carried the local traditions across many Romanian lands due to the transhumance method of shepherding. Their customs exist to these days: the "Sîntilie" (Saint Elijah) festival, national costumes, etc.

After the Romanian Revolution of 1989, the city diversified its economy. In Săcele there are nowadays several small furniture factories, lumber-mills, as well as meat-packaging facilities.

== Climate ==
Săcele has a warm-summer humid continental climate (Dfb in the Köppen climate classification).

Climate data for Săcele
Month	Jan	Feb	Mar	Apr	May	Jun	Jul	Aug	Sep	Oct	Nov	Dec	Year
Mean daily maximum °C (°F)	−0.3 (31.5)	1.6 (34.9)	6 (43)	12 (54)	16.9 (62.4)	20.2 (68.4)	22.1 (71.8)	22.3 (72.1)	17.4 (63.3)	12.3 (54.1)	7.1 (44.8)	1.3 (34.3)	11.6 (52.9)
Daily mean °C (°F)	−4.2 (24.4)	−2.7 (27.1)	1.5 (34.7)	7.2 (45.0)	12.3 (54.1)	16 (61)	17.8 (64.0)	17.8 (64.0)	13 (55)	7.7 (45.9)	3.1 (37.6)	−2.3 (27.9)	7.3 (45.1)
Mean daily minimum °C (°F)	−8.1 (17.4)	−6.8 (19.8)	−3 (27)	2.1 (35.8)	7.2 (45.0)	11.2 (52.2)	13.1 (55.6)	13.2 (55.8)	8.8 (47.8)	3.7 (38.7)	−0.2 (31.6)	−5.6 (21.9)	3.0 (37.4)
Average precipitation mm (inches)	47 (1.9)	46 (1.8)	64 (2.5)	98 (3.9)	147 (5.8)	157 (6.2)	159 (6.3)	126 (5.0)	79 (3.1)	62 (2.4)	54 (2.1)	53 (2.1)	1,092 (43.1)
Source: https://en.climate-data.org/europe/romania/brasov/sacele-15408/

== Buildings and monuments ==
The city has 17 churches of the following denominations: Orthodox, Lutheran, Reformed, Roman Catholic.

The Orthodox Baciu Church, Turcheș Church, Cernatu Church and, in Satulung, the Dormition and Archangels churches are historic monuments.

There is a copy of the Capitoline Wolf in Săcele.

== Education ==
Săcele houses two highs schools: the George Moroianu Theoretical High School and the István Zajzoni Rab Theoretical High School.

== Sport ==
The local football team is FC Precizia Săcele, currently playing in Liga IV. Its home ground is Stadionul Electro-Precizia.

== Population ==
Historical population
Year	Pop.	±%
1956	18,365	—
1966	22,809	+24.2%
1977	30,551	+33.9%
1992	30,226	−1.1%
2002	29,967	−0.9%
2011	30,798	+2.8%
2021	30,920	+0.4%
Source: Census data

According to the 2021 census, Săcele has a population of 30,920. At the 2011 census, the city had a population of 30,798 of which 75.1% were Romanians, 23% Hungarians, 1.2% Roma, and 0.2% Germans. At the 2002 census, 69% were Romanian Orthodox, 15.2% Evangelical Lutheran, 4.9% Roman Catholic, 3.4% each Reformed, and Pentecostal, 1.1% belong to "another religion" and 0.5% Unitarian.

== International relations ==
Săcele is twinned with:

- Vire, France
- Kisújszállás, Hungary

== Natives ==
- Iosif Boroș (born 1953), handball player
- Moise Crăciun (born 1927), cross-country skier
- George Giuglea (1884–1967), linguist and philologist
- Alexandru Lapedatu (1876–1950), President of the Senate and of the Romanian Academy, state minister
- Ion Lapedatu (1876–1951), finance minister, governor of the National Bank of Romania
- Nicolae Nicoleanu (1835–1871), poet
- Nicolae Popea (1826–1908), bishop of the Romanian Orthodox Church and historian
- Ioan Socec (1830–1896), librarian and editor
