= Dormition of the Theotokos Church, Satulung =

Orthodox church in Săcele, Romania

Coordinates: 45°36′48″N 25°43′19″E

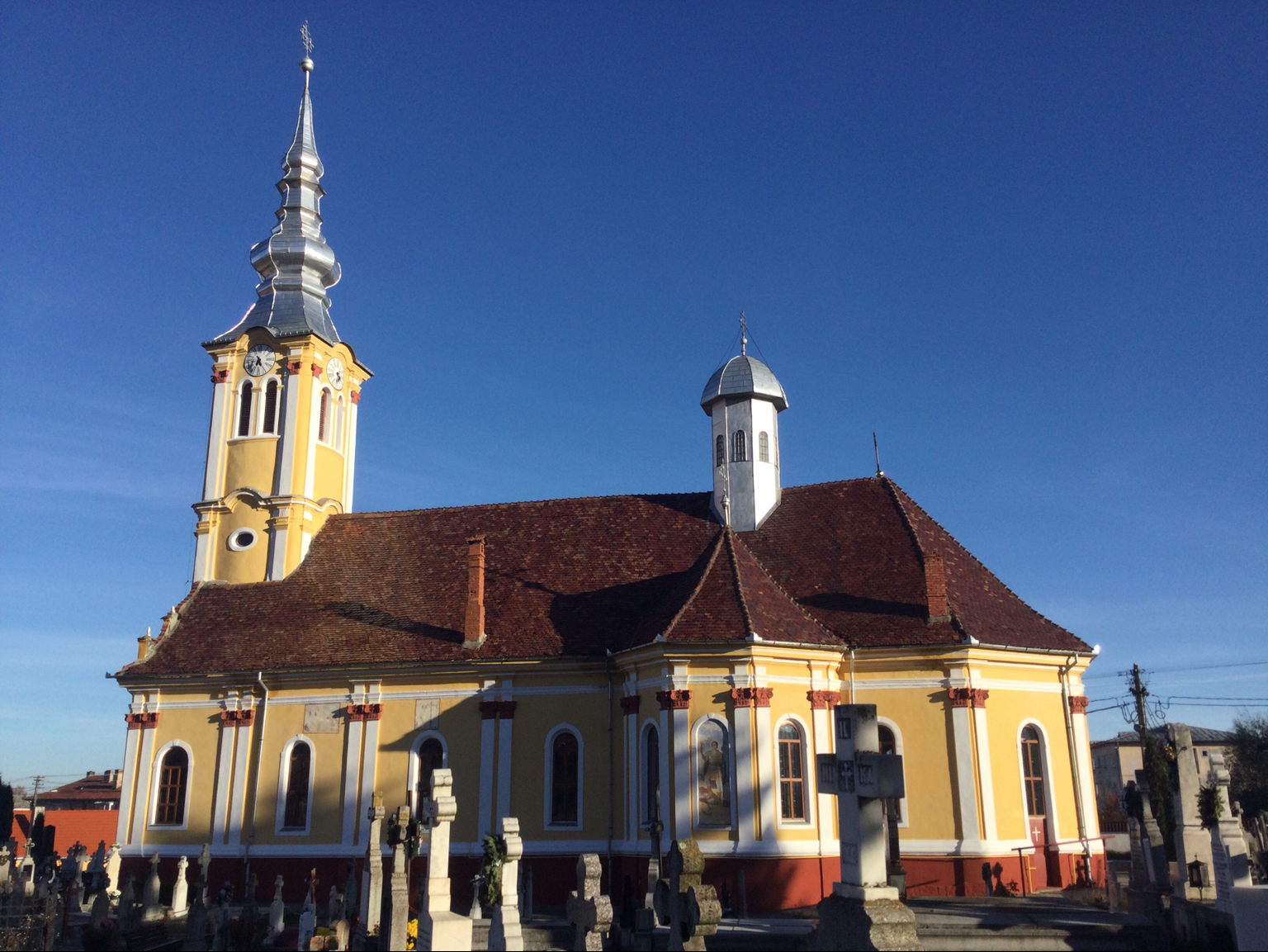
Dormition of the Theotokos Church

The Dormition of the Theotokos Church is a Romanian Orthodox church located on George Moroianu Boulevard, Săcele, Romania. Located in Satulung, a former village that is now a district of Săcele, it is dedicated to the Dormition of the Theotokos.

== Description ==
The church was built between 1811 and 1819, financed by contributions from parishioners. The materials are stone and brick, with a tile roof. It is 32 meters wide and 8 meters wide, with 14 meters separating the apses. On the western end, the narthex is preceded by a porch, above which rises a small bell tower. The oil painting dates to 1870–1874 and is the most ample project of Mișu Popp. The murals depict 67 scenes across the walls and ceilings of the nave and altar. Their style is realist, with Renaissance touches. The paintings were cleaned in 1924. The carved wood iconostasis largely features icons by an anonymous artist.

The exterior walls show traces of frescoes, indicating that the interior was also painted prior to Popp. Exterior repairs took place in 1911 and 1938, when the spire was coated in a fresh layer of tiles. The church owns a number of valuable objects, including a gilt silver chalice from 1853, a silver tabernacle, an epitaphios worked in gold thread at Odessa and a smaller one by Popp. The parish cemetery surrounds the church.

The church is listed as a historic monument by Romania's Ministry of Culture and Religious Affairs, a status it has held since 1924; the surrounding wall is also listed.

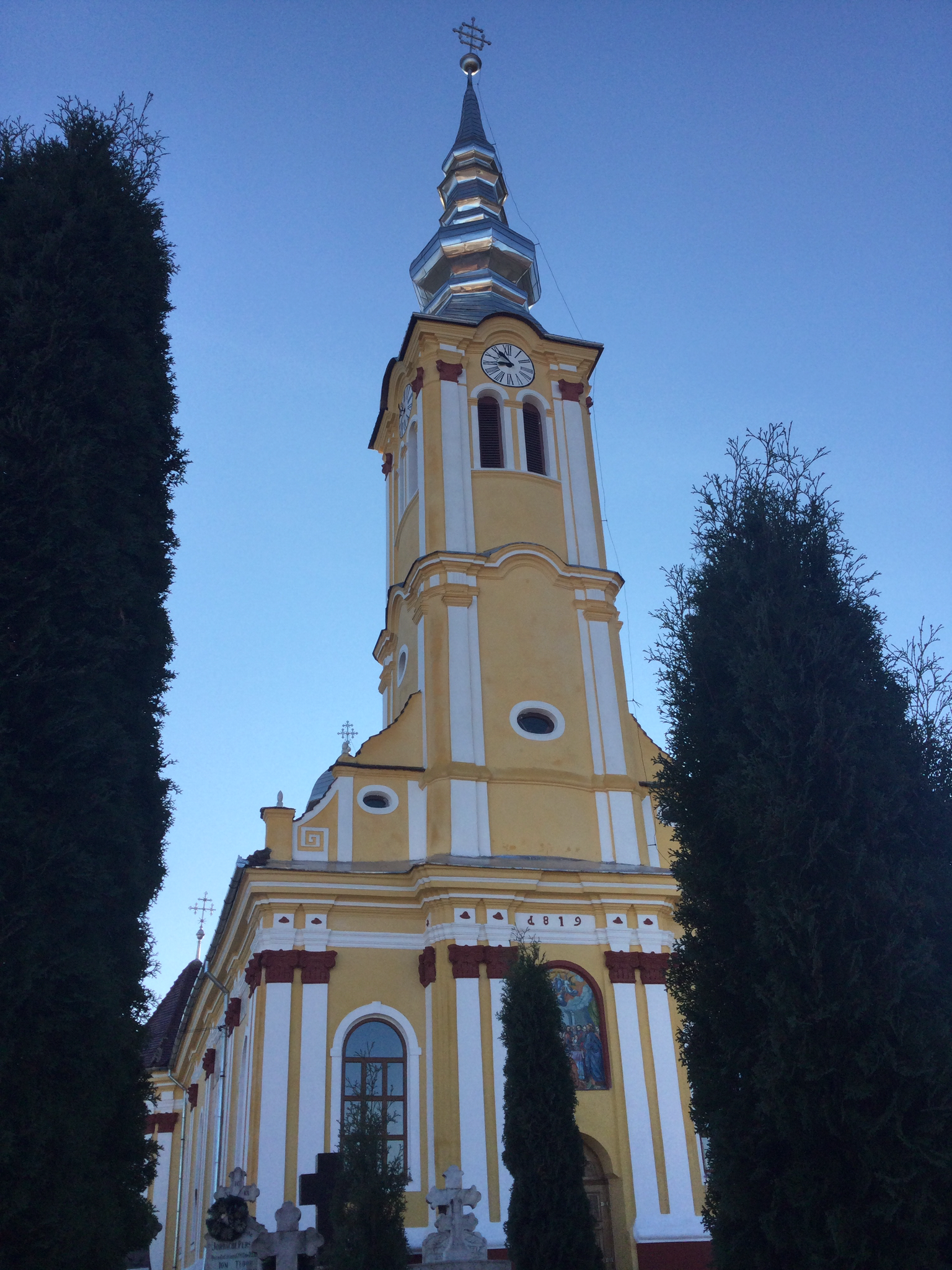
Façade

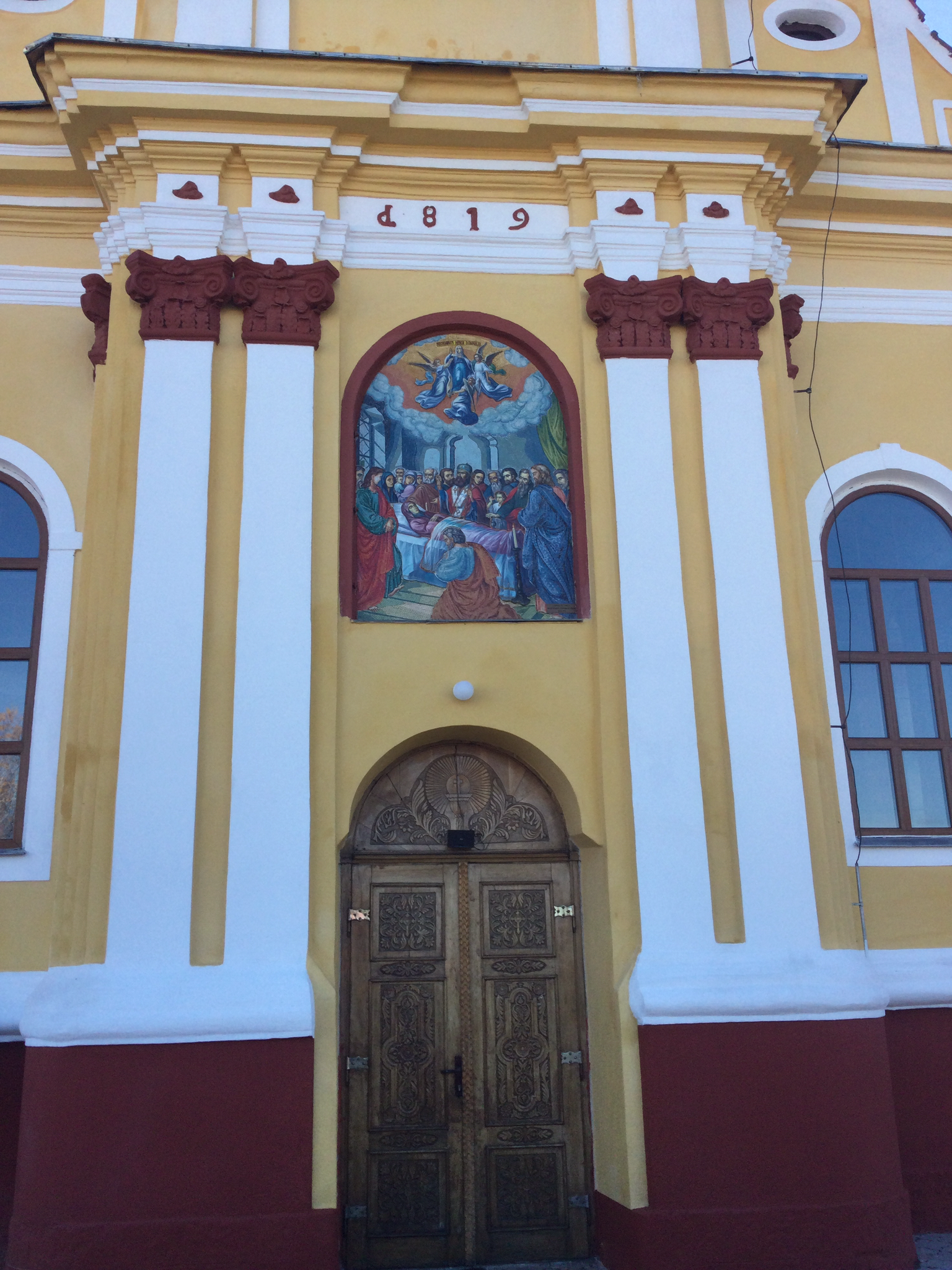
Entrance

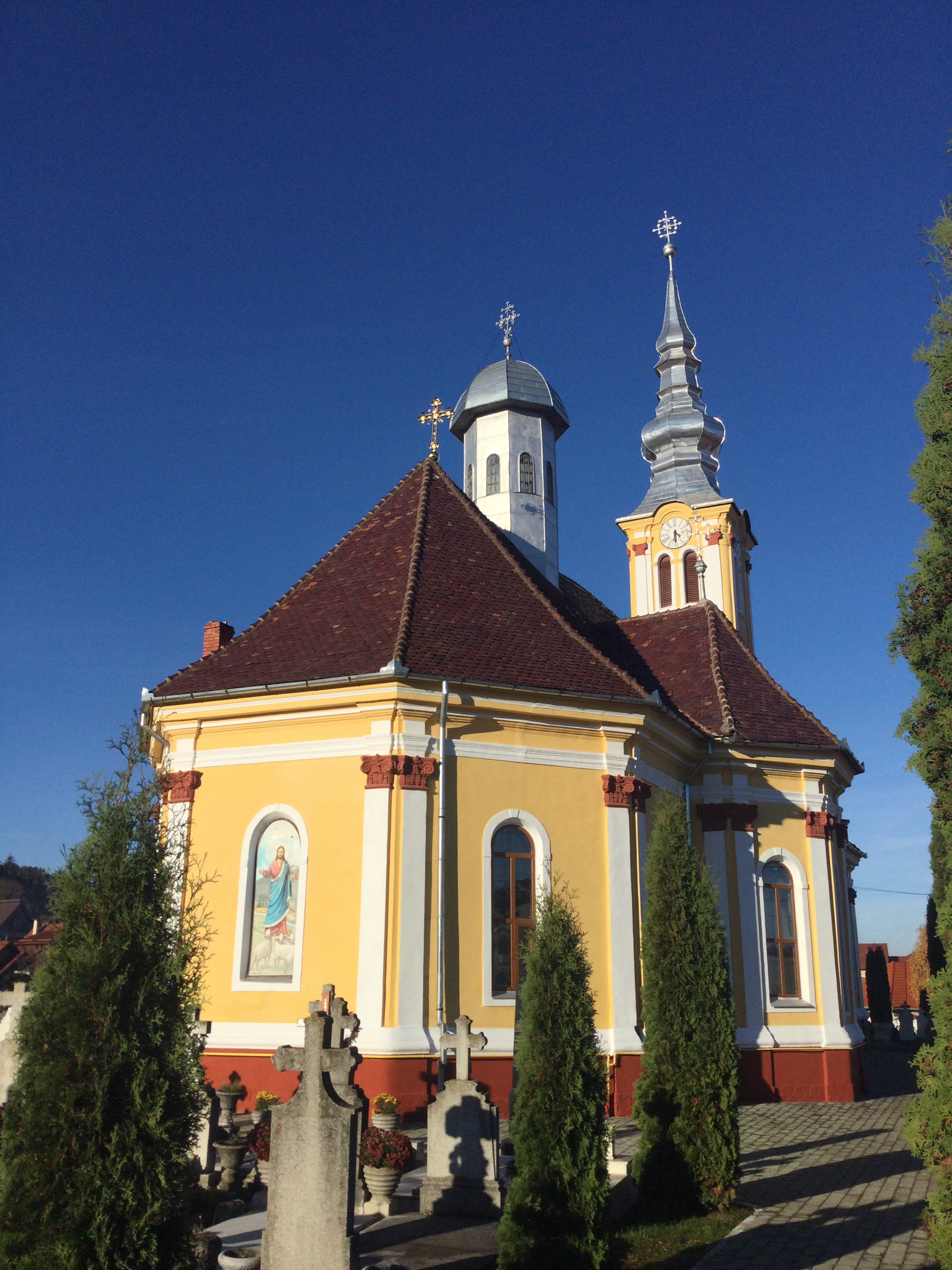
Rear

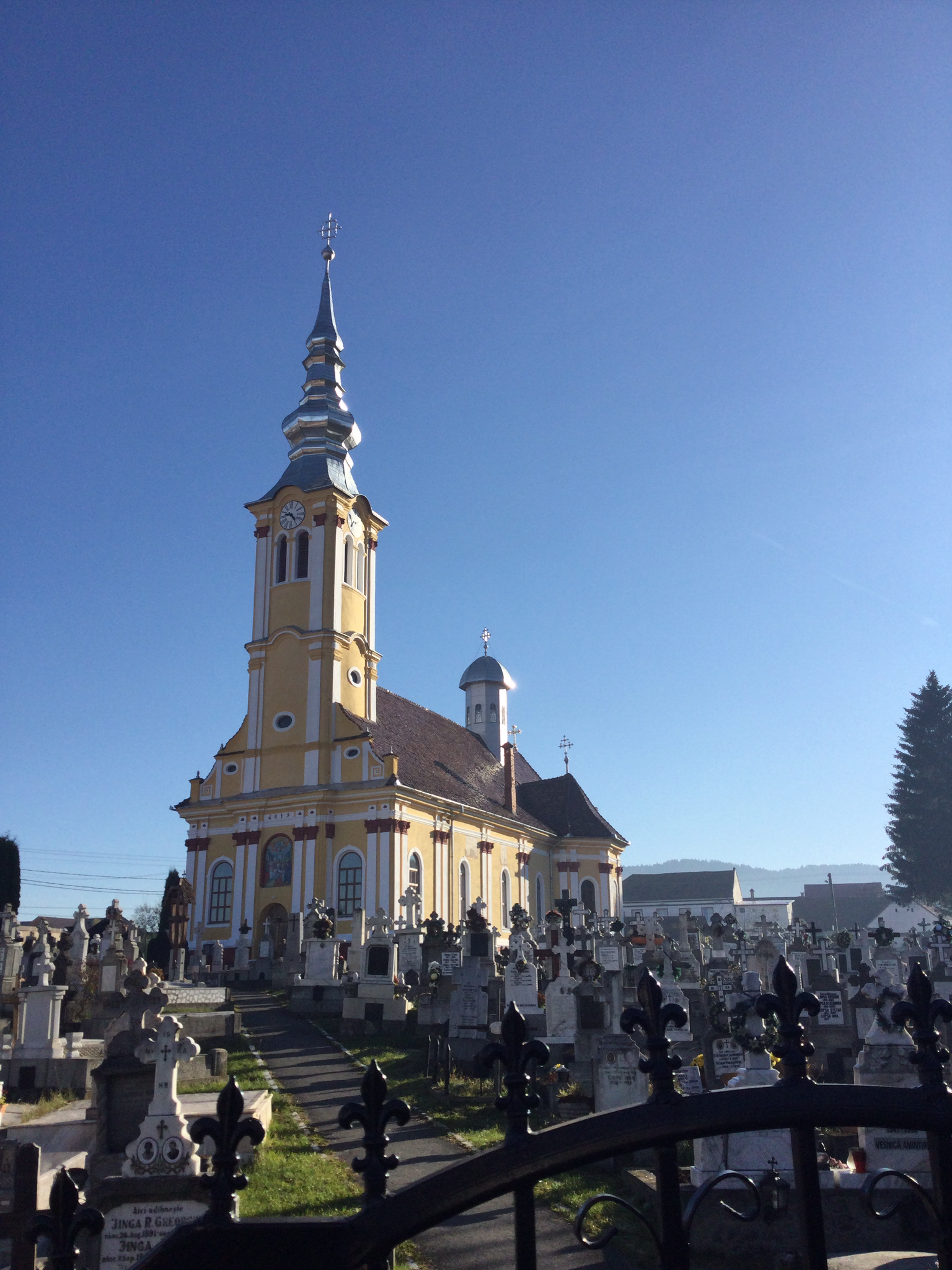
Ensemble
