= Baciu Church =

Orthodox church in Săcele, Romania

Coordinates: 45°36′29″N 25°40′26″E

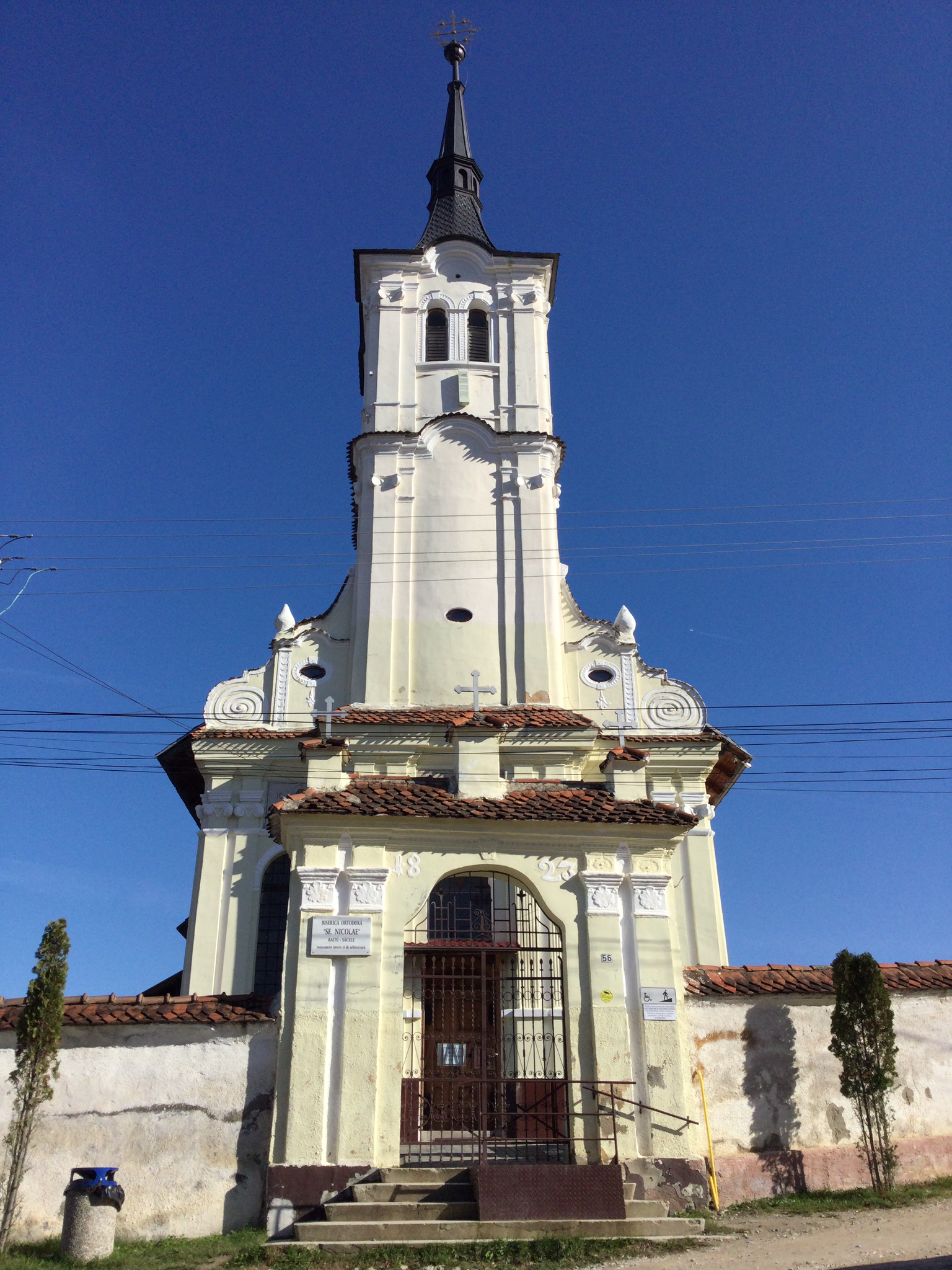
Baciu Church

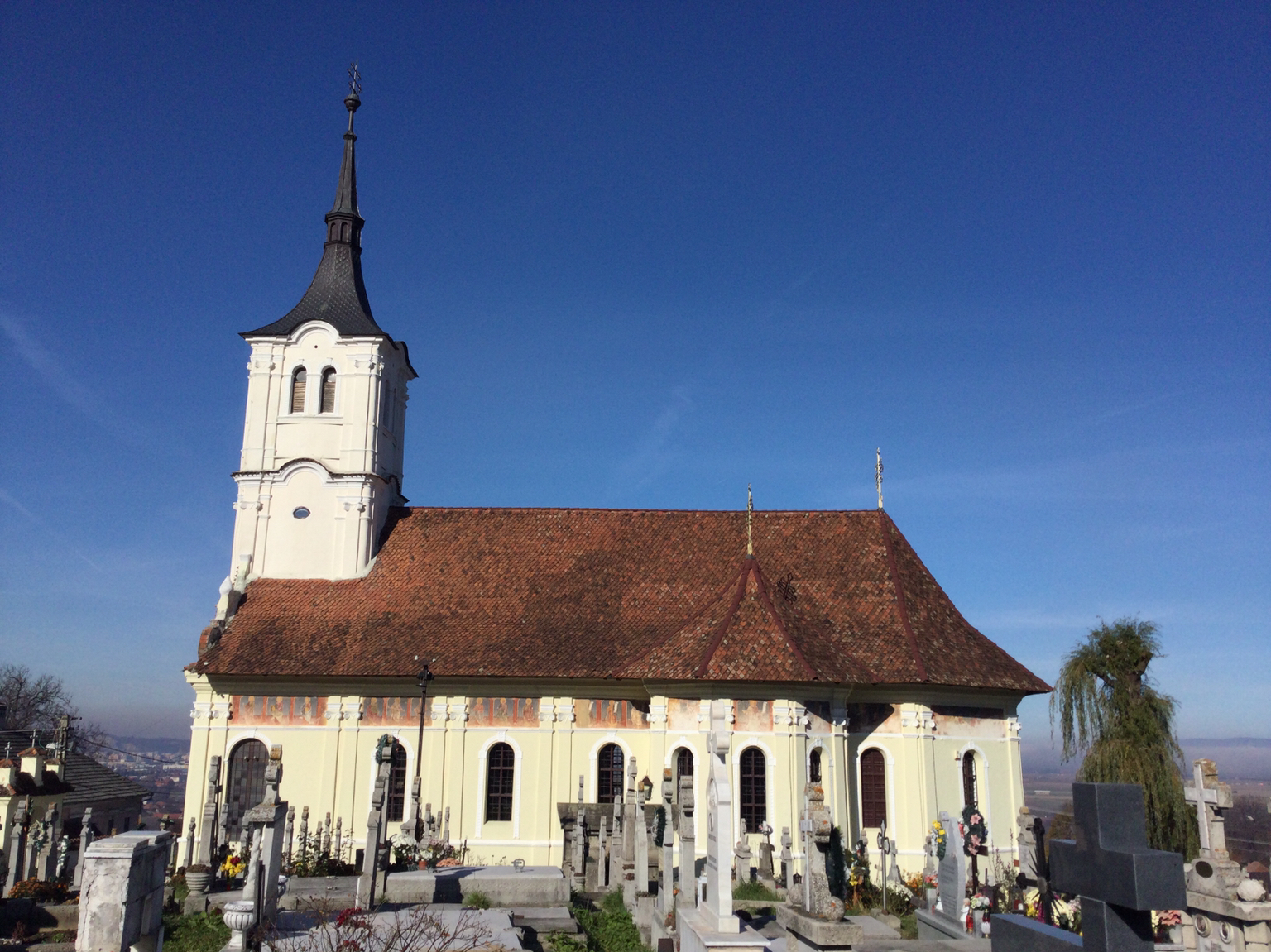
Side view

The Baciu Church is a Romanian Orthodox church located at 56 Alexandru Ioan Cuza Street, Săcele, Romania. Located in Baciu, a former village that is now a district of Săcele, it is dedicated to Saint Nicholas.

The church was built between 1776 and 1808 on the highest hill in the city. An old wooden church was adjacent to the site; there is now a funerary chapel in its place; the site of the former altar is marked by a stone cross from 1808. The lead ktetor was Urs Gâlă, who sold over 800 young sheep and donated the money to help build the church. He and other donors are commemorated on a stone plaque above the nave door.

The cruciform church sits in a nearly circular yard that serves as a parish cemetery. It is 29.74 meters long, 16.11 meters wide at the side apses and 14 meters high at the roof edge. The spire stretches to 32 meters, with the sound of the bells carrying far below into the valley. From the tower, one can see Brașov, Sfântu Gheorghe and several mountain ranges. The facade is in the contemporary Baroque typical of southern Transylvania. Pairs of Corinthian pilasters divide the facade into vertical registers. Pilasters also decorate the spire.

In the interior, there is a border of carved stone dividing the porch from the narthex. The two altar tables are each made of a single stone block, decorated with flowers, grape leaves, sun and moon in relief. The border and tables are inscribed with the date 1776. The cemetery gate bears the date 1823, when the thick stone and brick wall was built.

The church owns two metal crosses, one from 1799 and the other slightly newer; both are kept on the altar. It also has several 19th-century wooden icons and silver candleholders from the same period. A silvered icon of Saint Nicholas is held by tradition to be a gift from Michael the Brave. There are three liturgical books from the 1850s, and one from 1893. The exterior walls were painted with icons in 1934–1936; the interior frescoes are from the same period. The church, along with its gate and wall, is listed as a historic monument by Romania's Ministry of Culture and Religious Affairs.
