= Entry of the Theotokos into the Temple Church, Focșani =

Heritage site in Vrancea County, Romania

Coordinates: 45°41′47″N 27°10′37″E

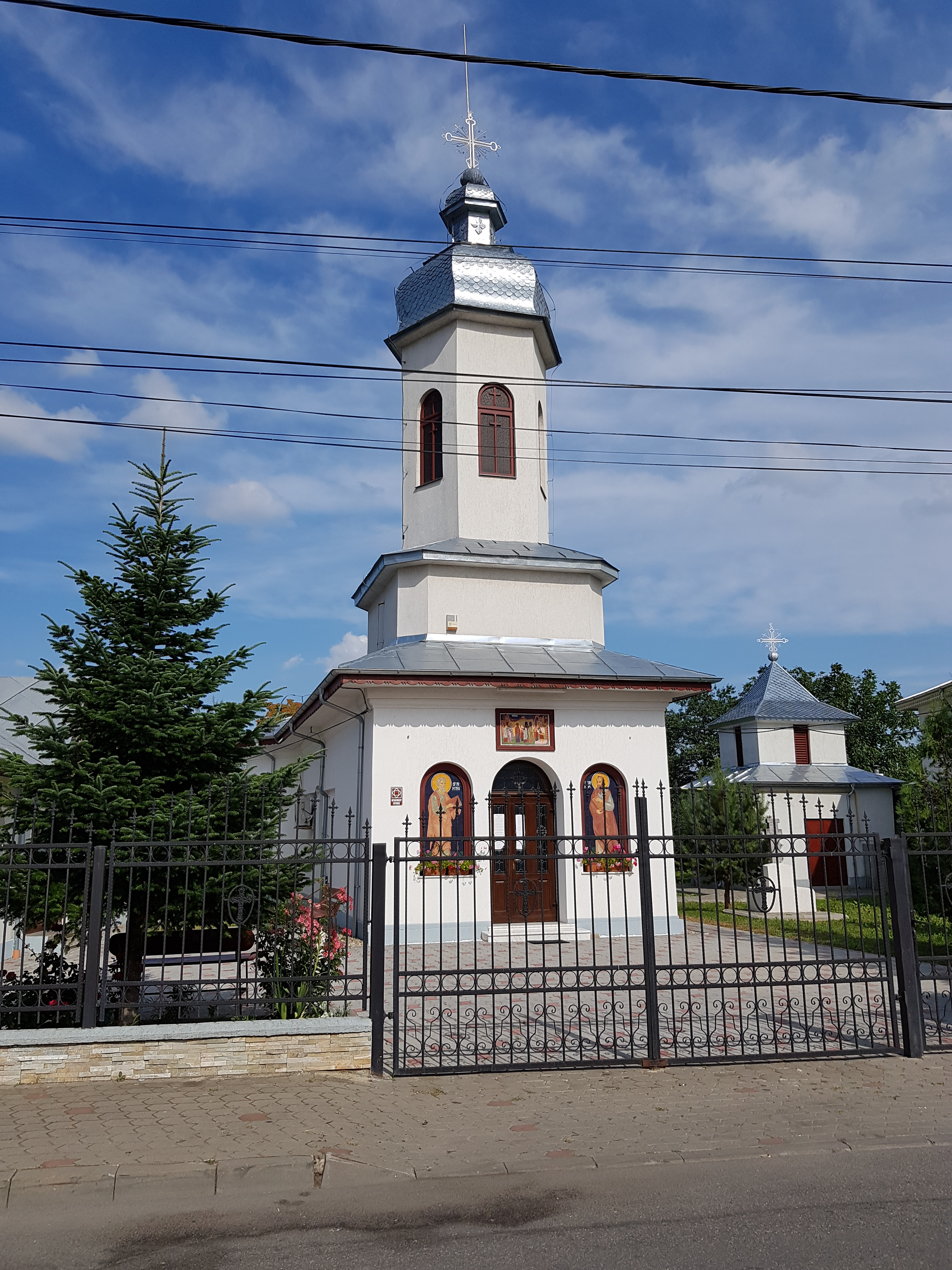
Entry of the Theotokos into the Temple Church

The Entry of the Theotokos into the Temple Church (Romanian: Biserica Intrarea Maicii Domnului în Biserică) is a Romanian Orthodox church located at 11 Ovidenia Street in Focșani, Romania. It is dedicated to the Entry of the Theotokos into the Temple (popularly called Ovidenia).

The church dates to the second half of the 17th century. It is mentioned in a 1687 document, whereby an individual made a donation to what was then a monastery. It appears on an Austrian map of 1789 as “Ovideni Monastery”.

The facades are simple, without ornamentation. The tall octagonal spire rises from the narthex. It has a square base and a bulb-shaped roof. The church is listed as a historic monument by Romania's Ministry of Culture and Religious Affairs, which supplies a completion date of 1687.
