= Ovidenia Armeni Church =

Heritage site in Vrancea County, Romania

Coordinates: 45°41′54″N 27°10′52″E

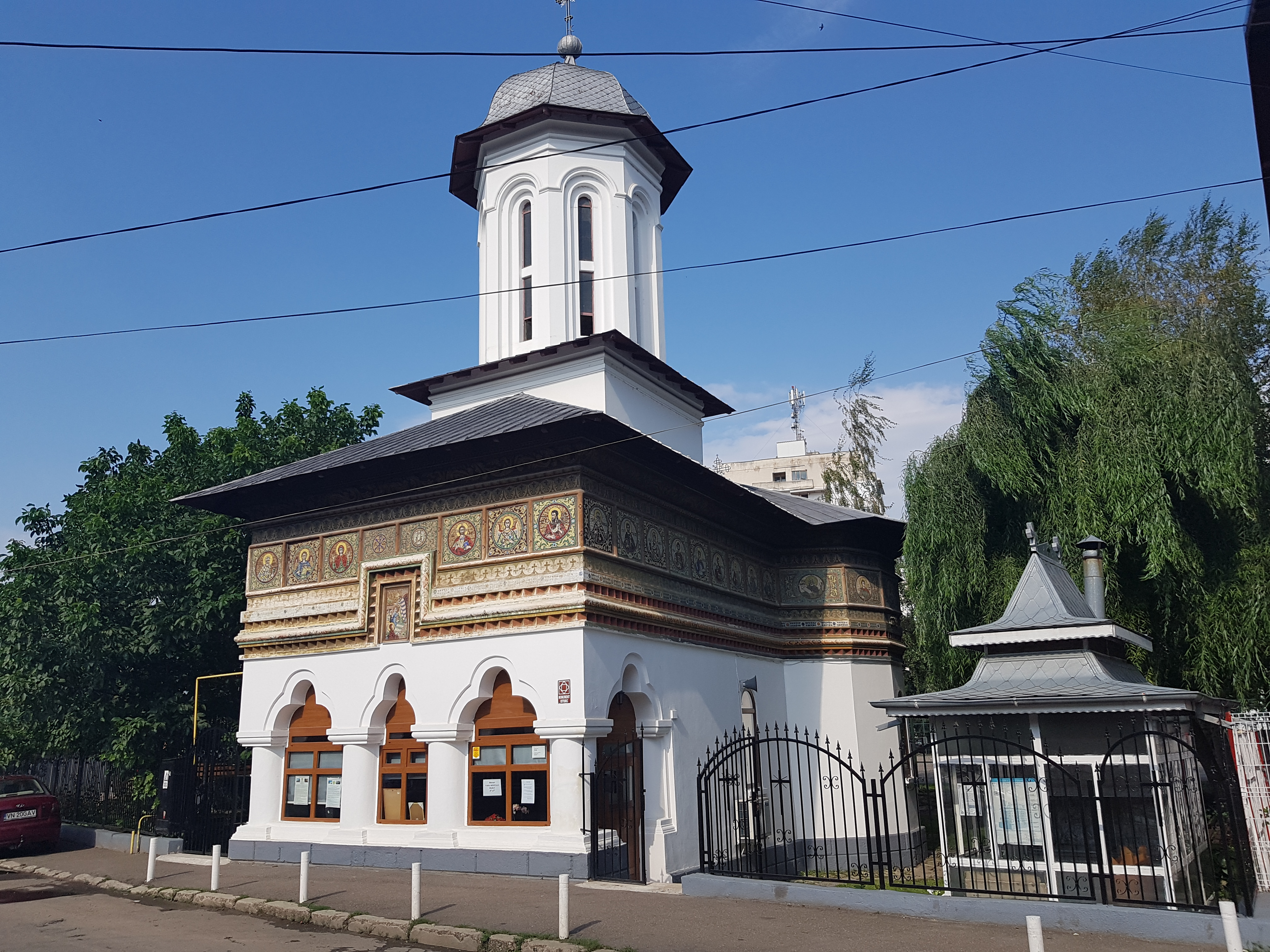
Ovidenia Armeni Church

The Ovidenia Armeni Church (Romanian: Biserica Ovidenia Armeni) is a Romanian Orthodox church located at 3 Făgăraș Street in Focșani, Romania. It is dedicated to the Entry of the Theotokos into the Temple (popularly called Ovidenia).

The church dates to the end of the 18th century; construction appears to have lasted from 1789 to 1798. The ktetors are anonymous. It was once in the midst of an Armenian quarter. The church was seriously damaged and abandoned during World War I. After 1975, the communist authorities wished to demolish the ruins, but a priest convinced them to abandon the idea. The interior was painted from 1980 to 1985. The parish reopened in 1998.

The church is listed as a historic monument by Romania's Ministry of Culture and Religious Affairs.
