= Entry of the Theotokos into the Temple Church, Iași =

Orthodox church in Iași, Romania

Coordinates: 47°09′55″N 27°35′16″E

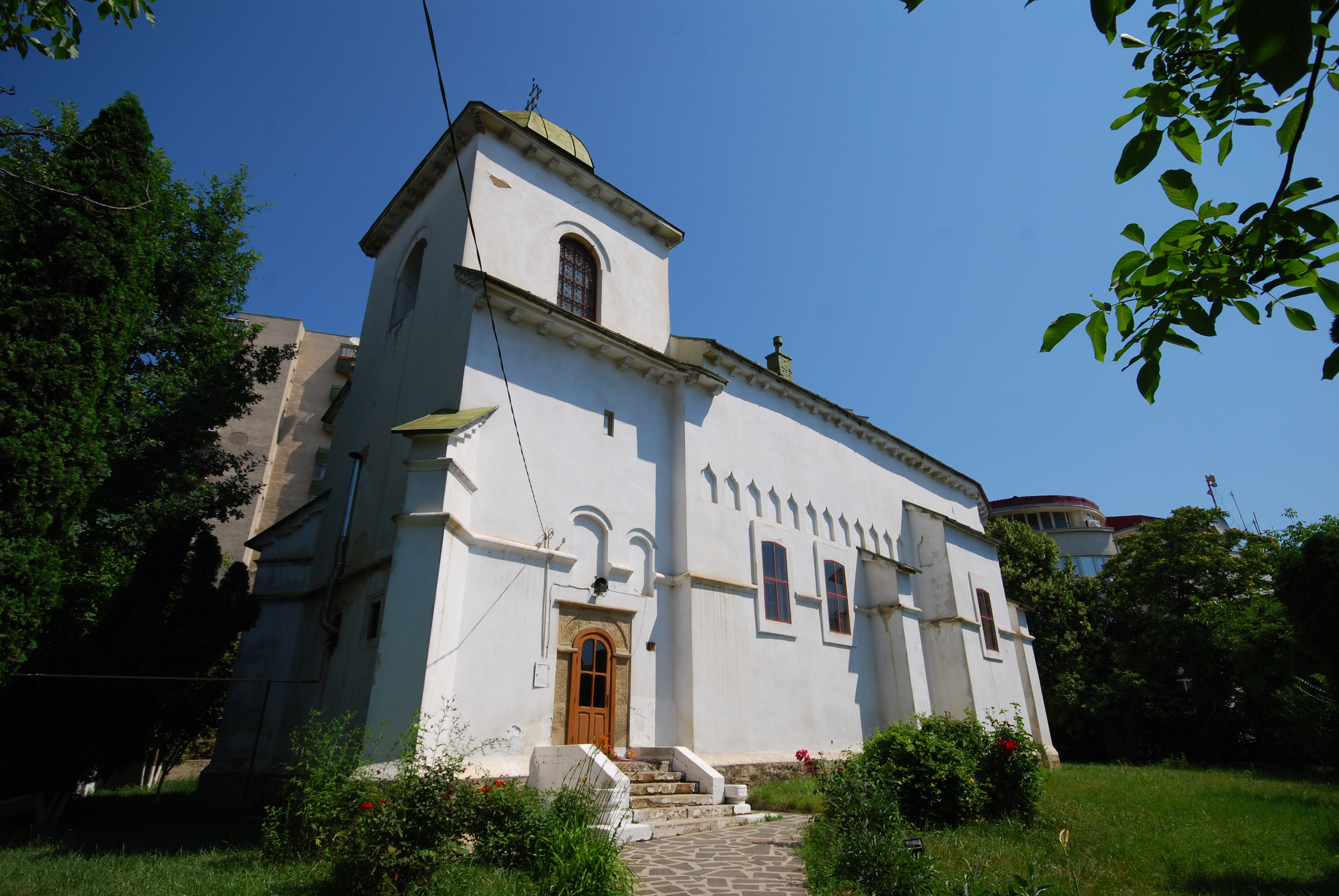
Entry of the Theotokos into the Temple Church

The Entry of the Theotokos into the Temple Church (Romanian: Biserica Vovidenia) is a Romanian Orthodox church located at 11 Vovidenia Street in Iași, Romania. It is dedicated to the Entry of the Theotokos into the Temple (popularly called Vovidenia).

A walled and fortified church, it is located near the Golia Monastery. Based on the oldest documentary mention, found on an icon, it dates to 1645, and the architecture is characteristic of Vasile Lupu's reign. Tradition holds that the ktitor was a Patriarch Nichifor, who had come from the Orient and settled in Iași; however, no document or inscription confirms this. The church was associated with two guilds: pastry makers and bragă sellers. During the 18th century, the spire supports were destroyed, and further renovation occurred the following century. Nevertheless, it was in ruins by 1902, when a thorough repair took place. The church was affected by the 1977 Vrancea earthquake, and restored in 1982-1983. In 1992, the church was given over to the local Greek students' association and served by priests who knew Greek; the students carried out repairs three years later. In 2006, with the number of Greek students much reduced, the church was made a chapel of the Metropolitan Cathedral. In 2010, it became a parish church.

The church owns old books and an icon from 1824. A princely school once functioned near the church. There used to be a cemetery in the churchyard, and in the early 20th century, several gravestones still existed, carved in the Romanian Cyrillic alphabet with one in Greek. In 2005, the church's collection of valuables was recovered from the National Bank of Romania. This includes German coins, jewelry and a small gold coin featuring Justinian I.

The church is listed as a historic monument by Romania's Ministry of Culture and Religious Affairs.
