= Mocani =

Romanian shepherd subgroup from Transylvania

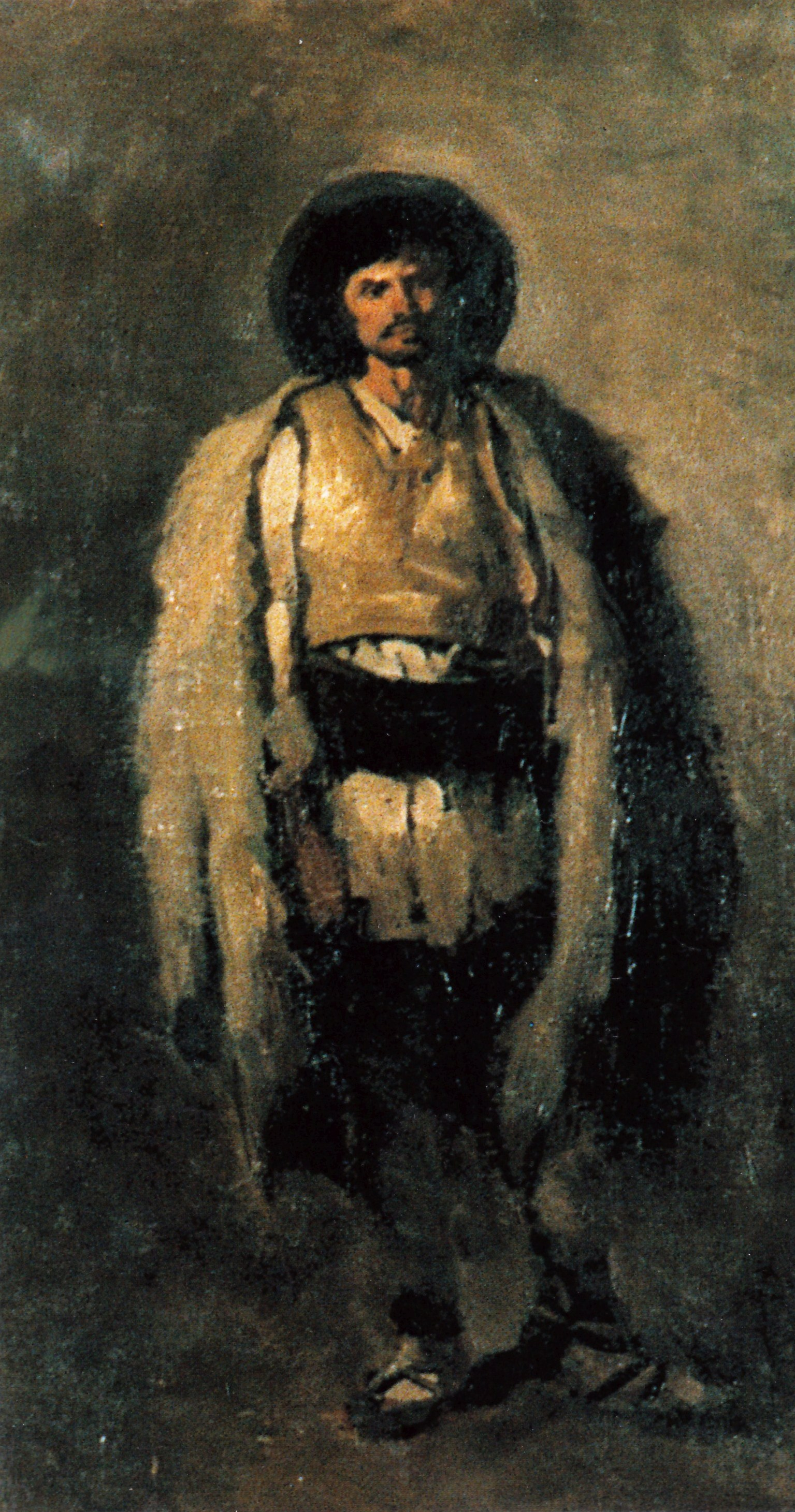
Mocanul ("The Mocan"), 1867 painting by Nicolae Grigorescu

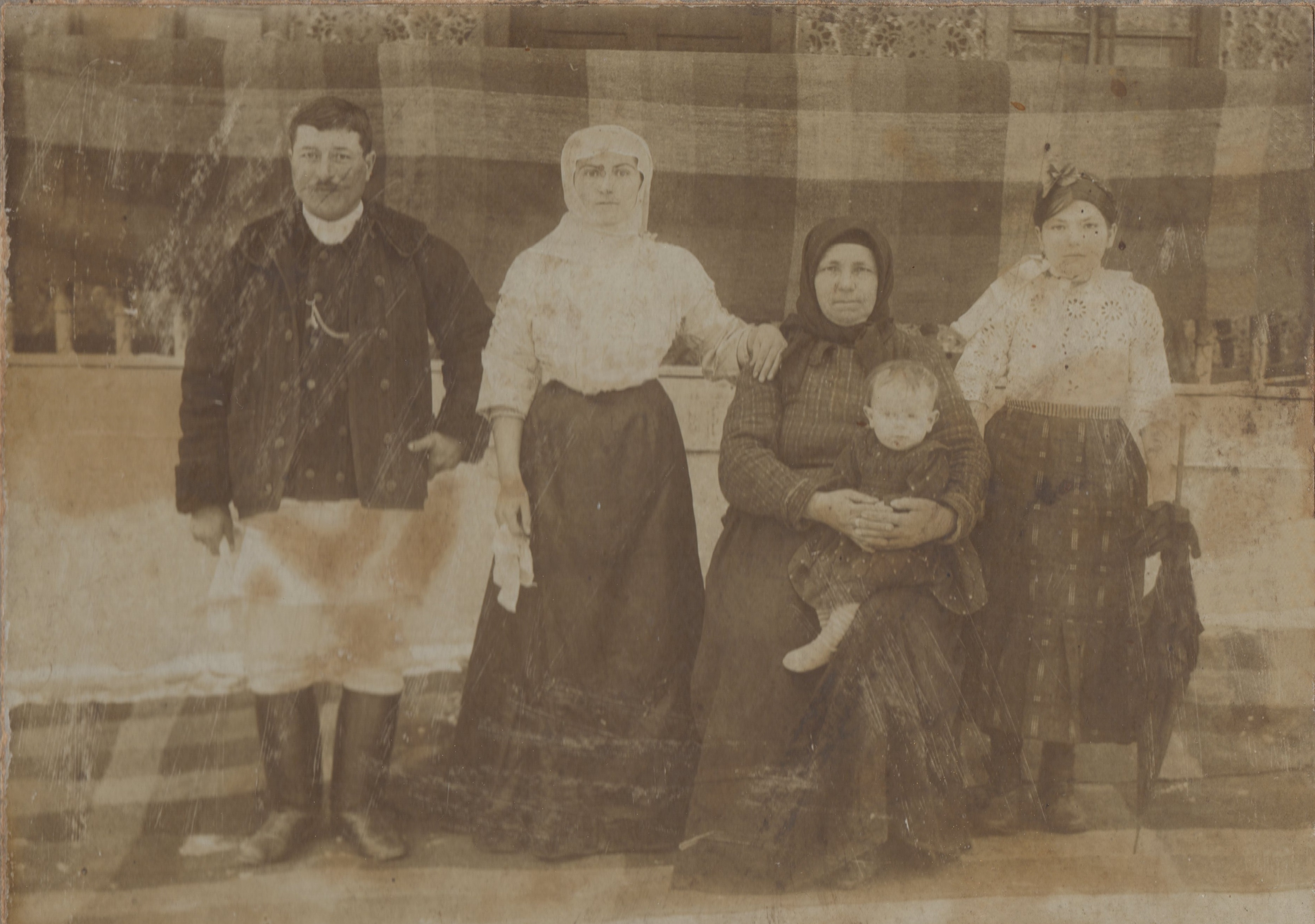
Mocani from Brețcu

The Mocani (sg. Mocan), sometimes referred to as Mocans in English, are an ethnic Romanian subgroup composed by shepherds from Transylvania traditionally practicing transhumance between southern Transylvania and the region of Dobruja.

A large number of Mocani left the Habsburg monarchy to escape the oppression they were subjected to in their homeland and settled permanently in Dobruja, a region then under the Ottoman Empire where they had more freedom and could own more land. This region was then multiethnic, composed of native ethnic Romanians but also of many other peoples such as Turks or Tatars. Following the integration of Northern Dobruja into Romania in 1878, more Mocani migrated to the region. This phenomenon had an effect on the local Romanian dialects, which adopted many words typically belonging to the Transylvanian varieties of Romanian.

== See also ==
- Gugulani
- Momârlani
