= Homorod (Dumbrăvița) =

Homorod Ciucaș
- Location within Romania

Location
- Country: Romania
- Counties: Brașov County
- Villages: Vlădeni, Dumbrăvița, Satu Nou

Physical characteristics
- Source: Perșani Mountains
- Mouth: Olt
  - coordinates: 45.8233°N 25.6105°E
- Length: 40 km (25 mi)
- Basin size: 322 km^{2} (124 sq mi)

Basin features
- Progression: Olt→ Danube→ Black Sea
- Tributaries
  - right: Vulcănița
- River code: VIII.1.51

The Homorod or Ciucaș is a left tributary of the river Olt in Romania. It discharges into the Olt in Feldioara. Its length is 40 km (25 mi) and its basin size is 322 km^{2} (124 sq mi). Near the village of Satu Nou, the river divides into two branches, the main branch keeping the name of Homorod, while the secondary branch is named Homorodul Vechi. The two branches rejoin upstream of Feldioara.

== Tributaries ==
The following rivers are tributaries to the river Homorod (from source to mouth):

- Left: Popilnica, Hămăradia, Valea Caselor, Valea Ursului, Geamăna (near Satu Nou)
- Right: Valea Boului, Valea Cărbunelui, Geamăna (near Dumbrăvița), Pârâul Auriu, Vulcănița
