= Romanian Special Operations Forces Command =

Joint Special Operations Forces Command
- Comandamentul Forțelor pentru Operații Speciale
- Coat of arms of the Joint Special Operations Forces Command
- Active: 1 March 2003 (as the 1st Special Operations Battalion); 1 March 2018 (as the Special Operations Forces Command)
- Country: Romania
- Allegiance: Romania
- Branch: Romanian Armed Forces
- Type: Special forces command
- Garrison/HQ: Târgu Mureș
- Anniversaries: 1 March
- Engagements: Kosovo Force; Iraq War; War in Afghanistan

Commanders
- Current commander: Brigadier General Claudiu-Ovidiu Dobocan

Insignia
- Flag of the Romanian Special Operations Forces Command

The Romanian Special Operations Forces Command (Romanian: Comandamentul Forțelor pentru Operații Speciale; FOS) is the special forces command of the Romanian Army formed on 01 March 2018 from the former 6th Special Operations Brigade. The Special Forces Command is headquartered in Târgu Mureș, and it is the structure through which the Chief of the General Staff exercises the control over all Special Forces units.

== History ==
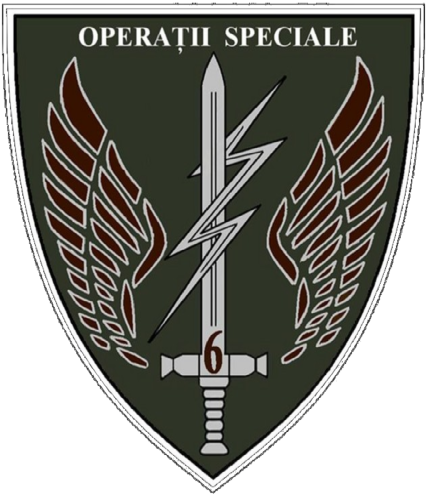
Badge of the former 6th Special Operations Brigade

In the late 1990s, the Romanian Armed Forces considered the possibility of creating a unified special operations force. The Romanian Joint Chiefs of Staff had discussions in which they sought to decide whether to keep the existing orders of battle of elite units incorporated into each separate category of forces (ground forces, the air force and the navy), or to create a new, integrated unit. They decided on the latter plan, especially considering the (at that time) future integration of Romania into NATO.

Rapid changes took place soon after the September 11, 2001 attacks, when the decision was made to create this new unit.

Selection started in 2003. Four allied nations—the United States, the United Kingdom, Israel, and Turkey—advised in the selection process, incorporating their experience into the new SOF battalion – Batalionul 1 Operații Speciale "Vulturii". On 1 August 2009, Regimentul 1 Operații Speciale (1st Special Operations Regiment) was established.

In preparation for the creation of the military unit, several elite units were disbanded. These included the 119th Recon Battalion in Oradea, the 56th Para battalion in Caracal–Deveselu, the 64th Para battalion at Titu–Boteni, and the 62nd para battalion in Câmpia Turzii. All but the last were elite units that participated in a large number of international exercises, as well as deployments abroad.

In 2017, it was announced that the Romanian Army was going to form a Special Forces Command in order to expand joint operations across air, land and maritime forces. On 1 March 2018, on the occasion of the Special Operations Forces Day, the Special Operations Forces Command was established in the Târgu Mureș garrison. The 6th Special Operations Brigade was officially transformed into the Special Forces Command on 25 October 2018. On the same day, it received its battle flag.

== Structure ==
- Special Forces Command in Târgu Mureș
  - 51st Special Operations Battalion "Vulturii" in Târgu Mureș
  - 52nd Special Operations Battalion "Băneasa–Otopeni" in Buzău
  - 53rd Commando Battalion "Smaranda Brăescu" in Bacău
  - 54th Support Battalion "Horea, Cloșca and Crișan" in Târgu Mureș
  - 164th Naval Special Operations Divizion in Mangalia
  - Special Operations Forces Training School "Burebista" in Vlădeni
    - Naval Special Operations Training Center in Mangalia

=== Batalionul 51 Operații Speciale "Vulturii" ===
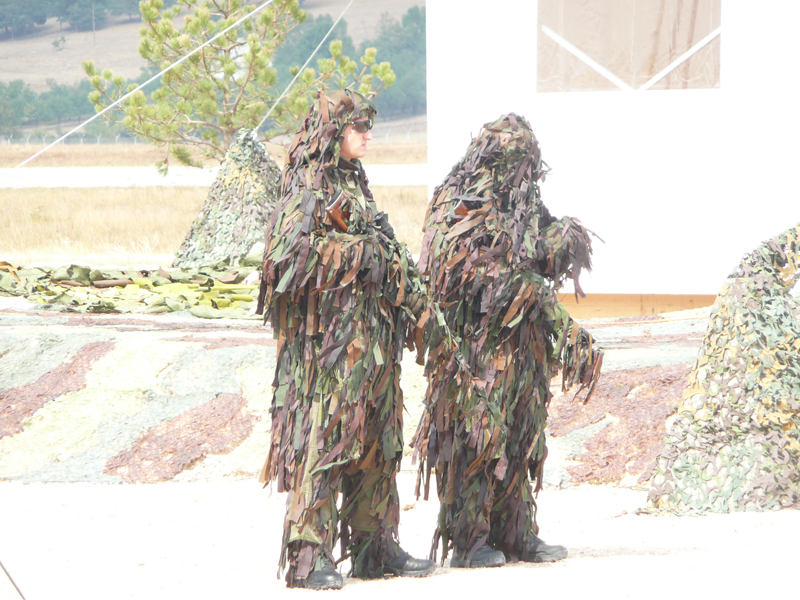
Sniper team from the 1st Special Operations Battalion

Batalionul 1 Operații Speciale "Vulturii", nowadays Batalionul 51 Operații Speciale "Vulturii" (51st Special Operations Battalion Vulturii) was created on 1 March 2003. Battalion became operational in late 2005, after several batches of graduates had already been selected. Members of the SOF battalion have benefitted from courses abroad, such as the US Army Special Forces course, the Force Recon course of the United States Marine Corps, as well as other courses. The US Army Special Forces also sent several instructors who were stationed in Romania for periods of up to 6 months at a time. The Turkish Special Forces were also heavily involved in advising on the selection process, due to the high number of exercises previously held in common with various units in Romania. The United Kingdom and Israel also sent instructors, although it is unclear from which units they came.

Special operations battalion became fully operational in 2007, with a company having been already active since 2006. Elements of the battalion were deployed in Afghanistan. A notable casualty of this deployment was Captain (posthumously Major) Tiberius-Marcel Petre, who was killed in a firefight. He was posthumously awarded the Order of the Star of Romania and the U.S. Bronze Star Medal.

Asked if members of the unit will take part in real missions abroad, the former Minister of National Defense Teodor Atanasiu replied "with certainty".

Batalionul 610 was renamed from Batalionul 1 on October 25, 2011. The current name of the is Batalionul 51 Operații Speciale.

=== Batalionul 52 Operații Speciale "Băneasa–Otopeni" ===
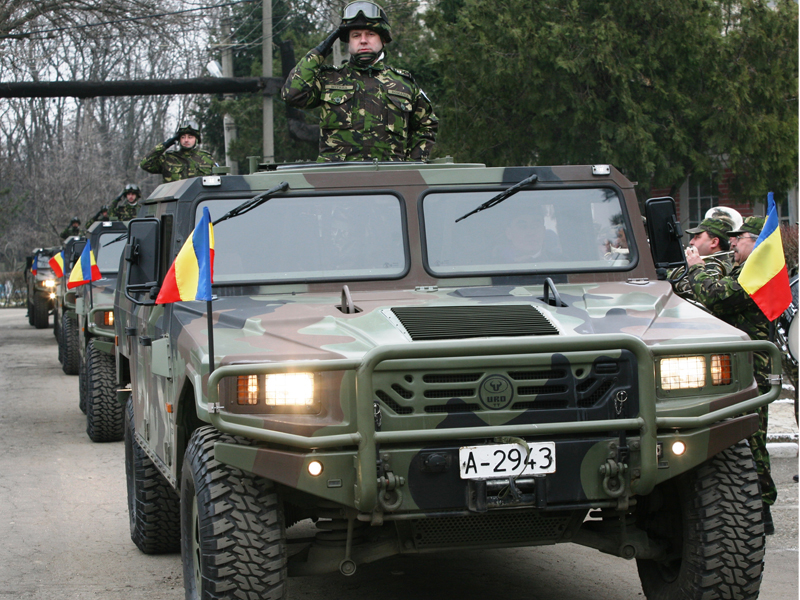
Romanian paratroopers on VAMTACs.

Batalionul 52 Operații Speciale "Băneasa–Otopeni" (52nd Special Operations Battalion "Băneasa–Otopeni") was formerly known as Batalionul 60 Parașutiști "Băneasa–Otopeni", which was the main paratrooper unit of the Romanian Land Forces. It was originally formed in 1941. It was previously subordinated to the 1st Territorial Army Corps, and its headquarters are located in Buzău. The battalion was part of the 2nd Paratroopers Brigade (HQ Clinceni), which was disbanded in 2005 due to a reorganization program of the Romanian Land Forces, in order to reach NATO standards. Batalionul 60 Parașutiști "Băneasa–Otopeni" was renamed Batalionul 620 Operații Speciale in 2011.

Their first foreign operation came in 2009 in Kosovo, where an 86-man unit was deployed. The unit was equipped with URO VAMTAC vehicles.

=== Batalionul 53 Comando "Smaranda Brăescu" ===
Batalionul 53 Comando "Smaranda Brăescu" (53rd Commando Battalion "Smaranda Brăescu") is a commando paratrooper unit of the Romanian Armed Forces. It was formerly known as Batalionul 498 Parașutiști "Smaranda Brăescu" (498th Paratroopers Battalion), a paratrooper battalion of the Romanian Land Forces, established on 30 November 1990. It was previously subordinated to the 4th Infantry Division (HQ Cluj-Napoca) and its headquarters are located at Bacău. The battalion was part of the 4th Para Brigade (HQ Bacău), which was disbanded in 2005 due to a reorganization program of the Romanian Land Forces, in order to reach NATO standards. Batalionul 498 Paraşutiști "Smaranda Brăescu" was renamed Batalionul 630 Parașutiști "Smaranda Brăescu" in 2011.

=== Batalionul 54 Sprijin "Horea, Cloșca și Crișan" ===
Batalionul 54 Sprijin "Horea, Cloșca și Crișan" (54th Support Battalion "Horea, Cloșca and Crișan"), former Batalionul 640 Logistic (640th Logistics Battalion), is responsible for command and logistics support for the Special Operations Forces Command.

=== Divizionul 164 Forțe Navale Pentru Operații Speciale ===
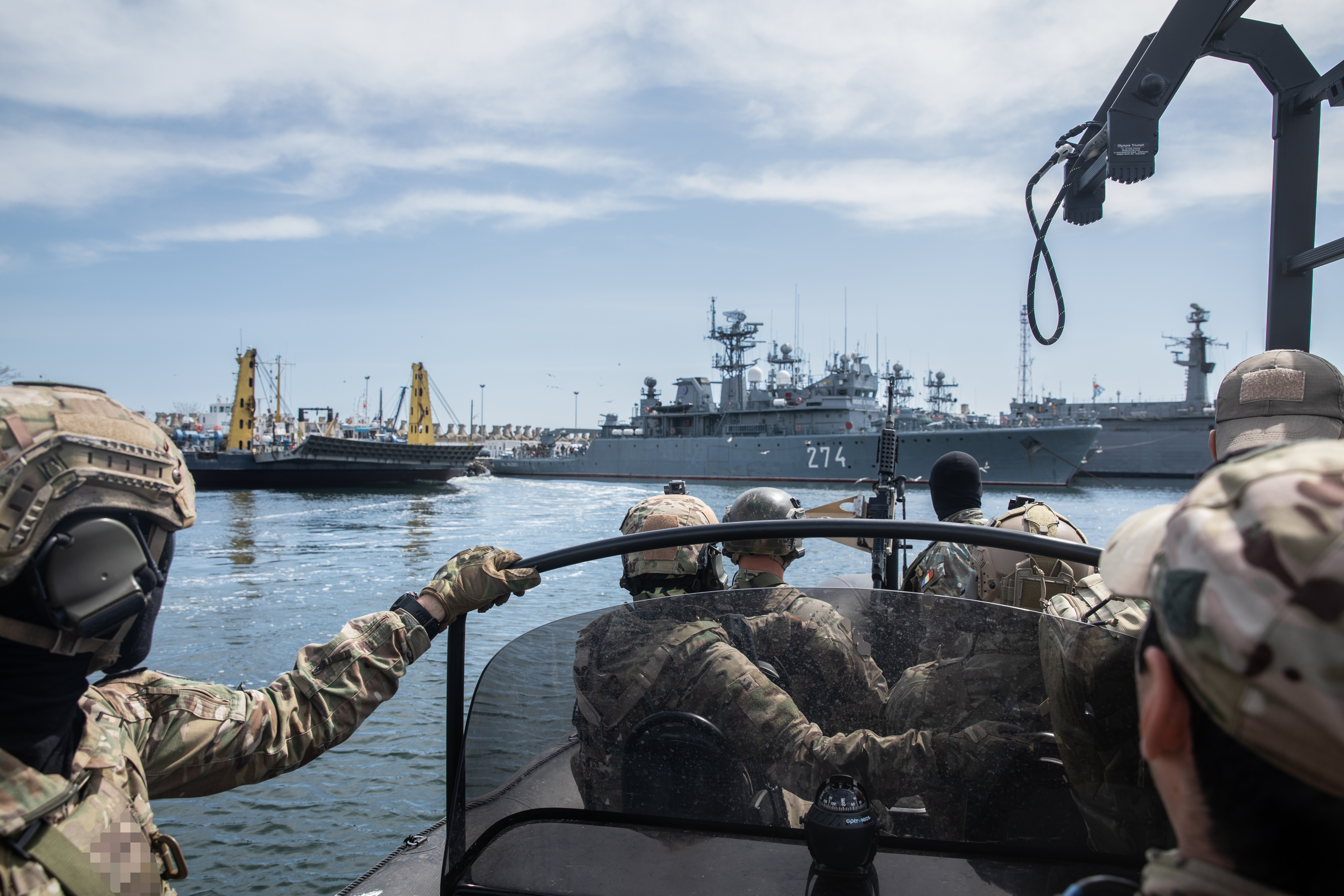
Romanian Naval Special Operations Forces (NAVSOF) train together with US Navy SEALS during exercise Trojan Footprint 2022

Divizionul 164 Forțe Navale Pentru Operații Speciale (164th Naval Special Operations Divizion) is naval component of the elite troops of the Romanian Army. In 1998, the 175 Diver Ship Divizion (Divizionul 175 Nave Scafandri) was formed by merging all the deep-sea diver and combat diver units. In December 2014, the combat diver section of the 175th Divizion became the "Combat and Special Operations Divers Section". From May 2016, it was named the 164th Naval Special Operations Divizion. At that time it was under the command of the 39th Diver Center (Centrului 39 Scafandri).

=== Școala de instruire a forțelor pentru operații speciale "Burebista" ===
In 2017 the School of Application of Forces for Special Operations was formed. The first course was carried out with the support of the Joint Training Center for Paratroopers, Special Operations and JTAC from Buzău. The school received the nickname "Burebista" in 2020. In 2021, the school was transformed into the Special Operations Forces Training School (Școală de instruire a forțelor pentru operații speciale - ScIFOS) following the establishment of the Naval Special Operations Training Center in Mangalia.

The barracks of the Special Operations Forces Training School are located near Vlădeni, Brașov County. Student accommodation is provided in modular buildings with a capacity of 130 places.

== Timeline ==
- Batalionul 1 Operații Speciale 1 March 2003 - 1 August 2009
- Regimentul 1 Operații Speciale 1 August 2009 – 25 October 2011
- Brigada 6 Operații Speciale 25 October 2011 – 01 March 2018
- Comandamentul Forțelor pentru Operații Speciale 01 March 2018 – present
