= Maria Constantinescu =

Maria Constantinescu may refer to:

- Maria Constantinescu (handballer)
- Maria Constantinescu (rower)
