= Arena Hărman =

Stadium in Romania

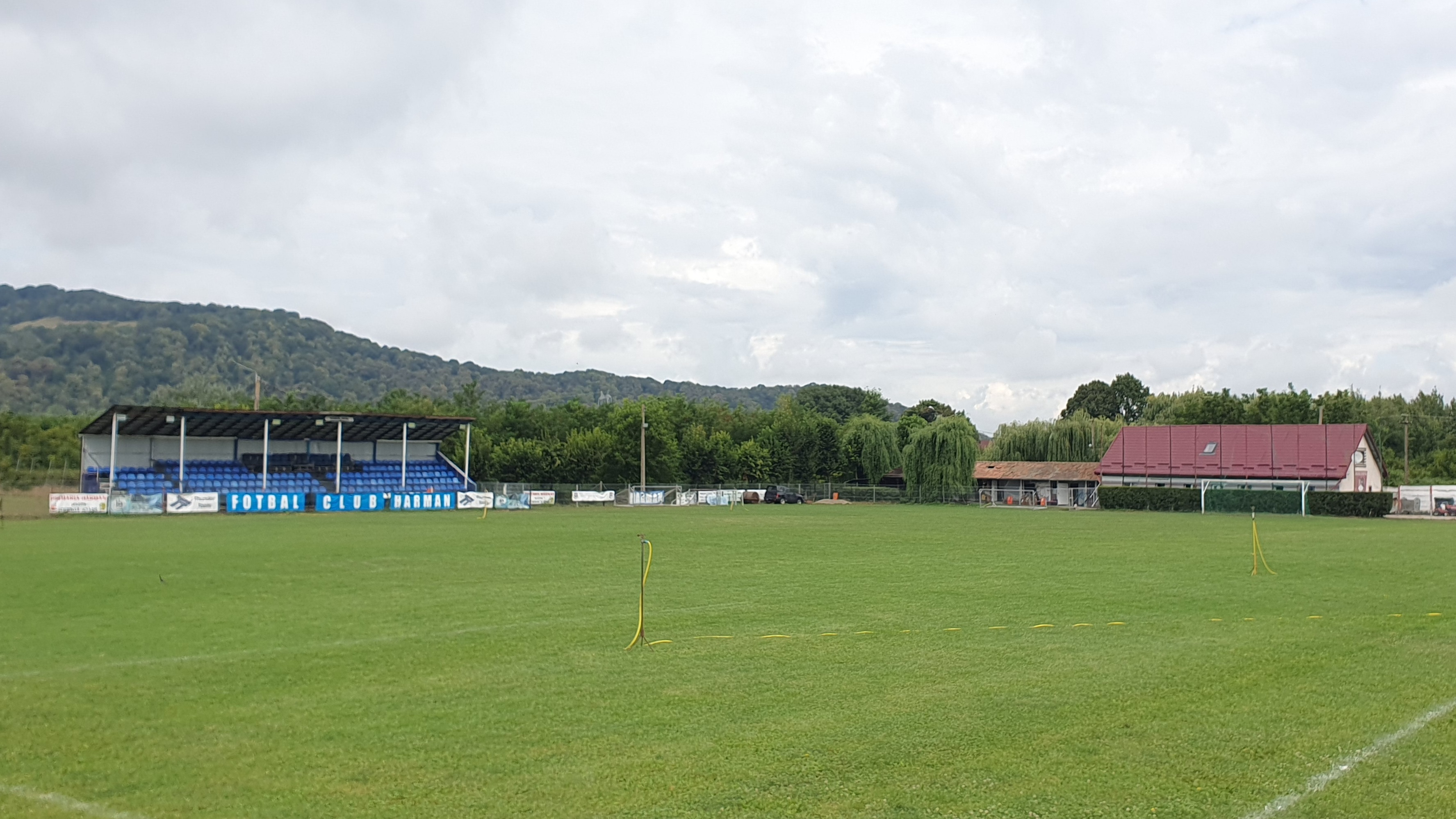
- Interactive map of Arena Hărman
- Former names: Stadionul Înfrățirea
- Address: Str. Ecaterina Teodoroiu 61A
- Location: Hărman, Romania
- Coordinates: 45°43′04.2″N 25°40′51.2″E
- Owner: Commune of Hărman
- Operator: Unirea Hărman
- Capacity: 500 seated
- Surface: Grass

Construction
- Opened: 1980s
- Renovated: 2010s

Tenant
- Unirea Hărman (1980–present)

Arena Hărman is a multi-purpose stadium in Hărman, Romania. It is currently used mostly for football matches, has a capacity of 500 seats and is the home ground of Unirea Hărman.
