= Vizurești =

Vizurești may refer to several villages in Romania:

- Vizurești, a village in Ciocănești Commune, Dâmbovița County
- Vizurești, a village in Buciumeni Commune, Galați County
