= Brașov metropolitan area =

- Metropolitan area
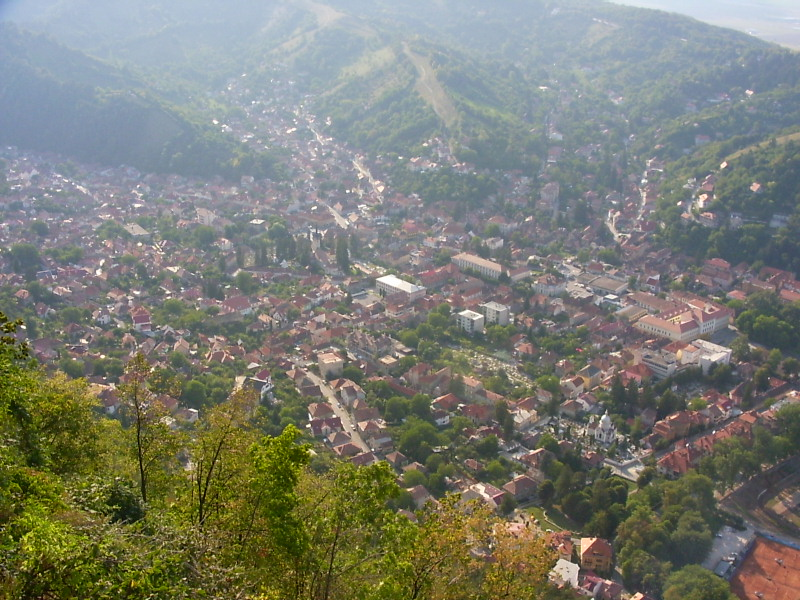
- Șchei seen from Tâmpa Mountain

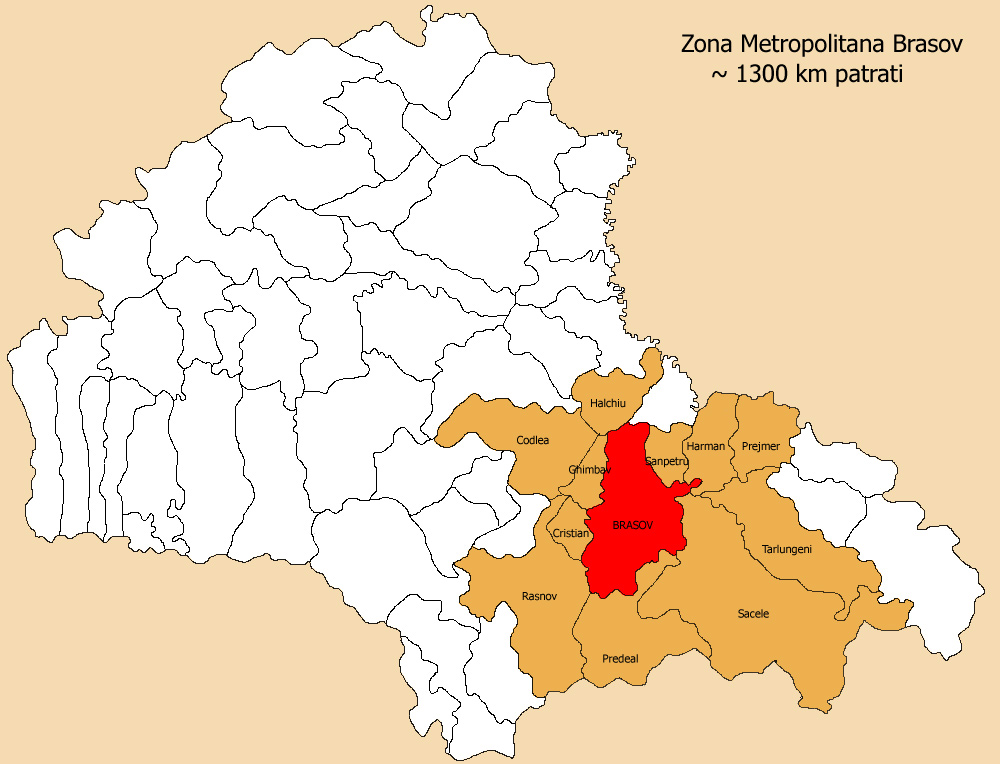
- Coordinates: 45°40′N 25°37′E
- Country: Romania
- County: Brașov
- Central Municipality: Brașov
- Other cities: Codlea, Săcele, Ghimbav, Predeal, Râșnov
- Other localities: Cristian, Sânpetru, Hălchiu, Tărlungeni, Prejmer, Bod, Hărman
- Functional: 2007

Area
  - Total: 1,368.58 km^{2} (528.41 sq mi)

Population (2021 census)
  - Total: 371,802
  - Density: 272/km^{2} (700/sq mi)
- Time zone: UTC+2 (EET)
  - Summer (DST): UTC+3 (EEST)
- Postal Code: 50wxyz^{1}
- Area code: +40 x68^{2}
- Website: www.metropolabrasov.ro
- ^{1}w, x, y, and z are digits that indicate the street, part of the street, or even the building of the address^{2}x is a digit indicating the operator: 2 for the former national operator, Romtelecom, and 3 for the other ground telephone networks

The Brașov metropolitan area is a metropolitan area in Brașov County, Romania, that includes the municipality of Brașov and 12 other nearby communities. It was constituted in 2007 with the aim of creating business opportunities, building and administering of living spaces and recreational areas, to attract more consistent investment, and to coordinate better environment and infrastructure projects. As of 2021, the metropolitan area has a population of 371,802, of whom 237,589 live in Brașov. The total area is 1,368.5 km^{2}.

As defined by Eurostat, the Brașov functional urban area has a population of 398,953 residents (as of 2015).

== Localities ==
- Municipalities: Brașov, Codlea, Săcele
- Cities: Ghimbav, Predeal, Râșnov
- Communes: Cristian, Sânpetru, Hălchiu, Tărlungeni, Prejmer, Bod, and Hărman

== Statistics ==
Population census
Year	2002	2011	2021
Pop.	399,902	369,896	371,802
±%	—	−7.5%	+0.5%

Name	Population (2002 census)	Population (2007 estimation)	Population (2011 census)	Area (km^{2})	Density (pop/km^{2})
Brașov	283,901	277,945	253,200	267.32	1,204
Codlea	24,256	24,550	21,708	132.79	182
Săcele	30,044	31,796	30,798	320	93
Ghimbav	5,100	5,357	4,698	28.08	181.62
Predeal	5,625	5,174	4,755	58.4	96.14
Râșnov	15,436	16,055	15,022	164.36	94
Cristian	3,952	4,300	4,490	27.73	142.51
Sânpetru	3,401	3,759	4,819	30.74	110.63
Hălchiu	4,072	4,560	4,218	56.67	71.85
Tărlungeni	7,413	7,996	8,320	135.66	54.65
Prejmer	8,323	8,876	8,472	60.48	137.61
Hărman	4,437	4,775	5,402	52.79	84.05
Bod	3,942	4,173	3,994	33.56	117.46
Total	399,902	399,316	369,896	1,368.58	270
