= Vulcănița =

Vulcănița may refer to the following rivers in Romania:

- Vulcănița, a tributary of the Holbav in Brașov County
- Vulcănița (Homorod), a right tributary of the river Homorod in Brașov County
- Vulcănița, a tributary of the Vulcana in Dâmbovița County
