= Crizbav =

- Commune
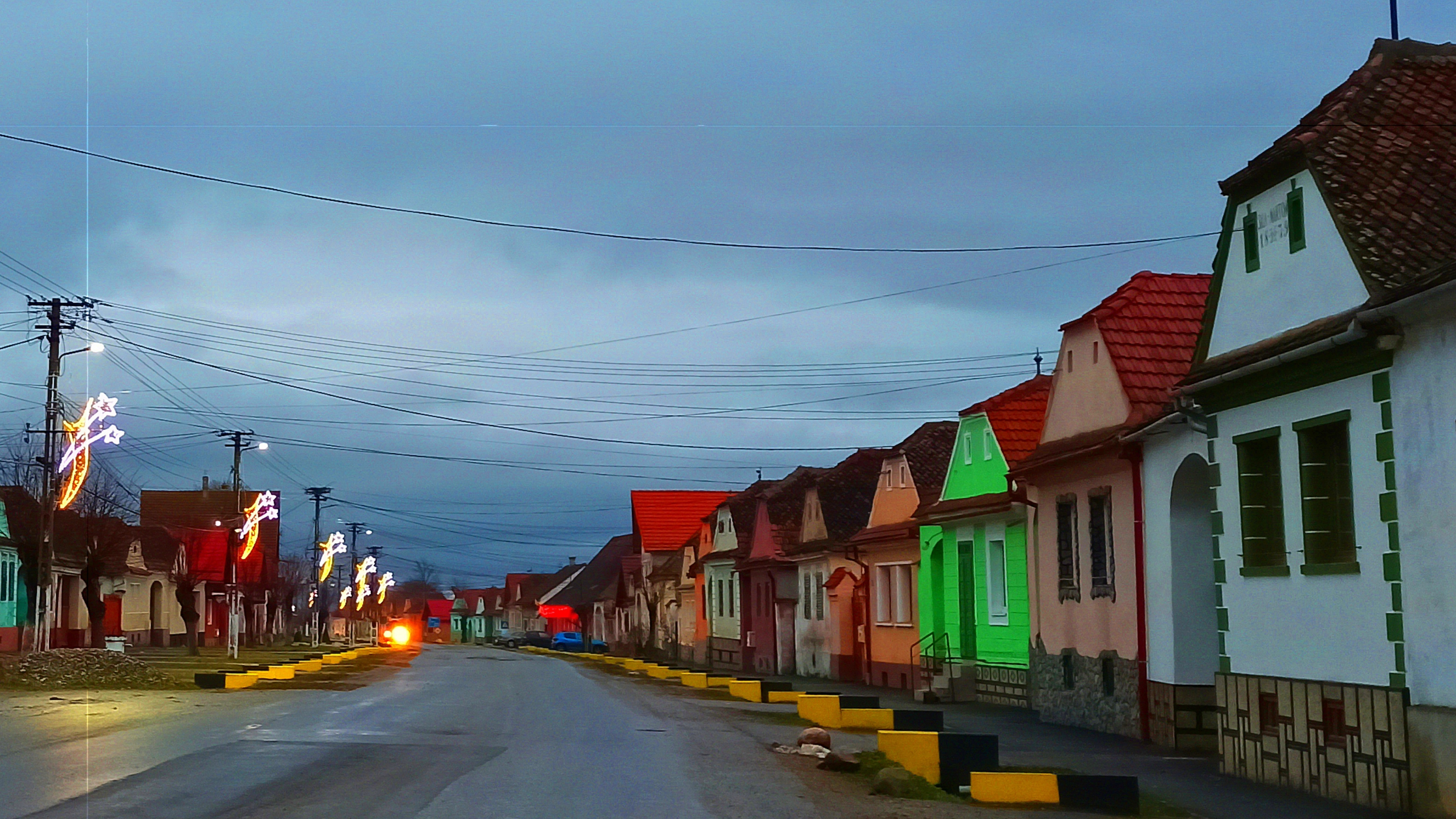
- Crizbav main street

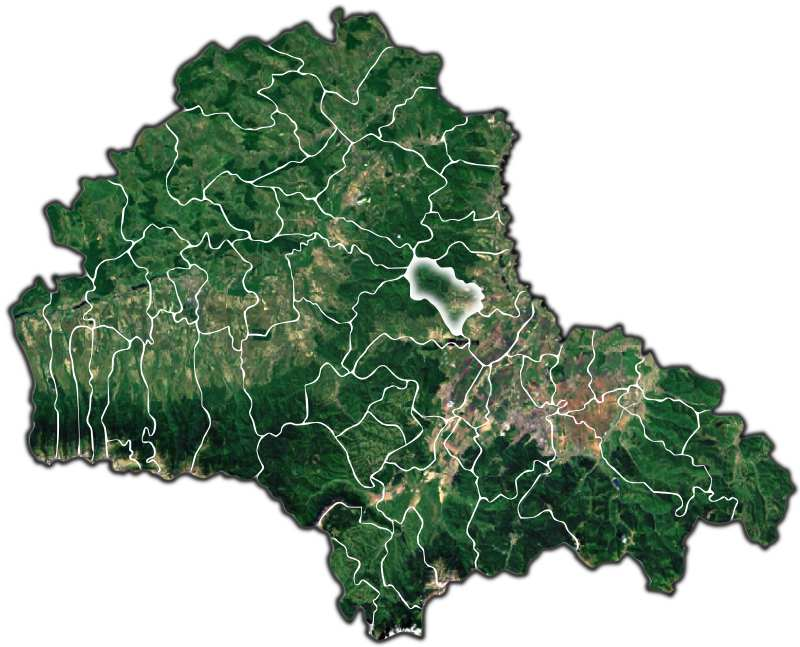
- Location within the county

- Location in Romania
- Coordinates: 45°49′N 25°28′E
- Country: Romania
- County: Brașov

Government
  - Mayor (2020–2024): Sorin Balași (PSD)
- Area: 53.13 km^{2} (20.51 sq mi)
- Elevation: 572 m (1,877 ft)
- Highest elevation: 1,055 m (3,461 ft)
- Lowest elevation: 513 m (1,683 ft)
- Population (2021-12-01): 2,952
  - Density: 55.56/km^{2} (143.9/sq mi)
- Time zone: UTC+02:00 (EET)
  - Summer (DST): UTC+03:00 (EEST)
- Postal code: 507081
- Area code: (+40) 02 68
- Vehicle reg.: BV
- Website: new.comunacrizbav.ro

Crizbav (Hungarian: Krizba, German: Krebsbach) is a commune in Brașov County, Transylvania, Romania. It is composed of two villages, Crizbav and Cutuș (Kutastelep).

== Geographical setting ==
Crizbav is located 24 km (15 mi) northwest of the county seat, the city of Brașov. It lies on the banks of the Crizbav River, on a high plateau of the Burzenland depression, at the southern foot of the Perșani Mountains. The commune belongs to the Burzenland historic region and is situated 10 km (6.2 mi) from national road DN13 (Feldioara commune) and 6 km (3.7 mi) from DN1 (Dumbrăvița commune).

Crizbav borders:

- to the north – the communes Comăna and Măieruș;
- to the east – the commune Feldioara;
- to the south – the commune Hălchiu;
- to the west – the communes Dumbrăvița and Părău.

The Crizbav commune altitude is 572 m (1,877 ft), decreasing to Feldioara and Satu Nou at 513–514 m (1,683–1,686 ft). Higher elevations in the commune are Horezu Peak, at 1,055 m (3,461 ft) and Citadel Peak, at 1,104 m (3,622 ft), both located in the foothills of the Perșani Mountains, approximately 6 km (3.7 mi) from the village center.

== Short history ==
The first written documents of the material and spiritual life of the commune dates back to Roman times. Evidence is provided by the Crizbav Citadel, which experts consider that it was built by the Romans after the occupation of Dacia, but certain written attestations are from 1335.

The history of the village is rich, beginning with the German name of the city, (Krebs Bach = Crabs Valley) and continuing with the use of Crizbav Citadel as military observation tower, as confirmed by the "Diploma of King Louis the Great" of March 12, 1344, or that of Prince Stephen Báthory of October 30, 1484.

== Demographics ==
Historical population
| Year | Pop. | ±% |
|---|---|---|
| 2002 | 2,139 | — |
| 2011 | 2,518 | +17.7% |
| 2021 | 2,952 | +17.2% |
Source: Census data

At the 2011 census, Crizbav had 2,518 inhabitants; 83.1% of those were Romanians and 16.1% Hungarians. At the 2021 census, the commune had a population of 2,952, of which 80.79% were Romanians and 9.55% Hungarians.

== Landmarks ==
- Archaeological site "La Cetate" (Crizbav) code LMI 2004 ISA-11273-BV formed by:
  - medieval fortification, LMI 2004 Code: BV-ImA-11273.01
  - Hallstatt settlement, LMI 2004 Code: BV-ImA-11273.02
  - Dacian fortress, LMI 2004 Code: BV-ImA-11273.03
- Heldenburg Citadel code LMI 2004: BV-II-I A-11662
