= Vulcănița (Homorod) =

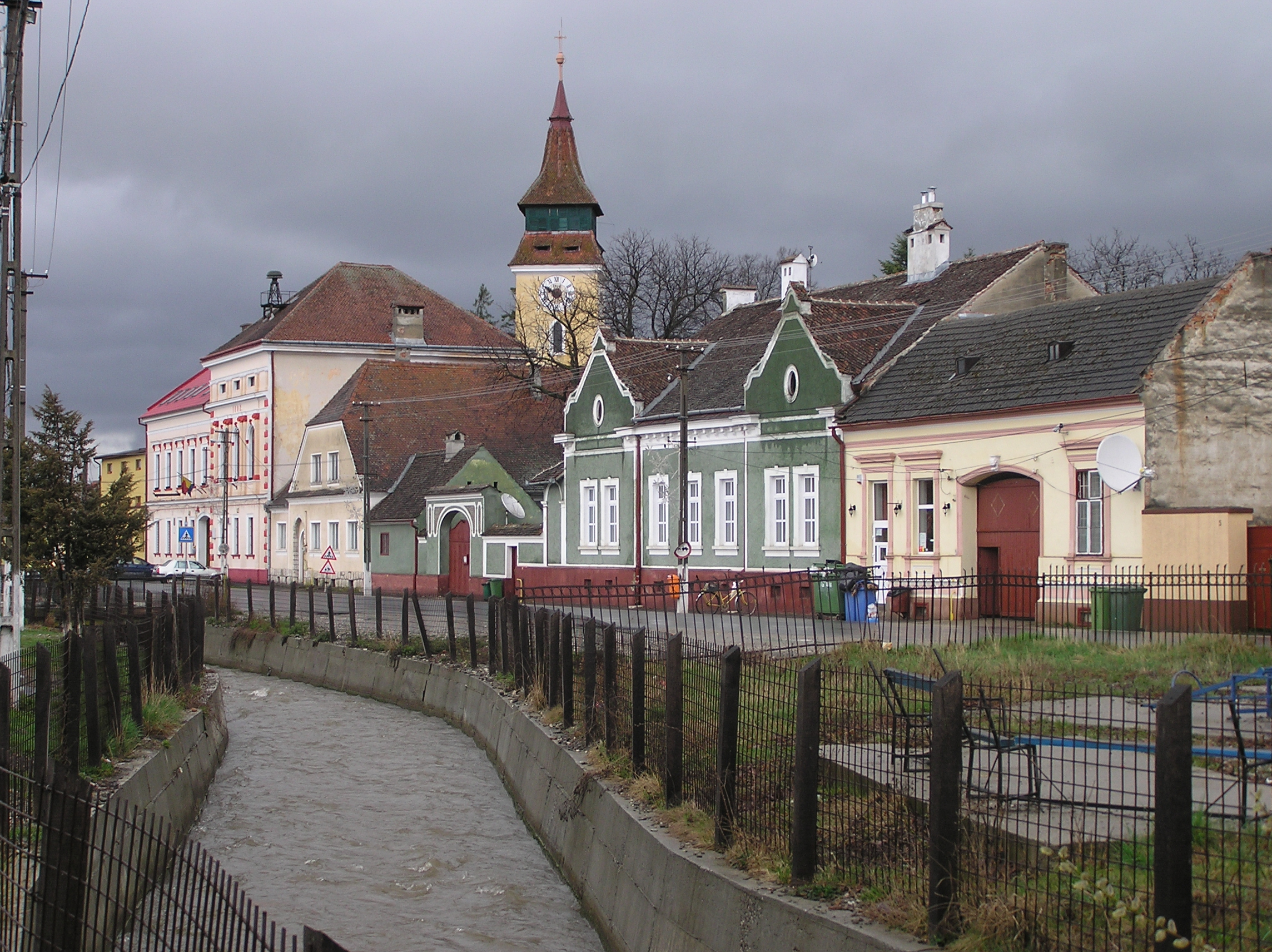
- The Vulcănița in Vulcan

- Location within Romania

Location
- Country: Romania
- Counties: Brașov County
- Villages: Vulcan, Codlea, Hălchiu

Physical characteristics
- Mouth: Homorod
  - location: Downstream of Hălchiu
  - coordinates: 45.7913°N 25.5610°E
- Length: 28 km (17 mi)
- Basin size: 97 km^{2} (37 sq mi)

Basin features
- Progression: Homorod→ Olt→ Danube→ Black Sea
- Tributaries
  - left: Hoapec, Valea Lată
  - right: Crepeș
- River code: VIII.1.51.6

The Vulcănița is a right tributary of the river Homorod in Romania. It discharges into the Homorod near Hălchiu. Its length is 28 km (17 mi) and its basin size is 97 km^{2} (37 sq mi).
