= Crizbav (river) =

River in Romania

- Location within Romania

Location
- Country: Romania
- Counties: Brașov County
- Villages: Crizbav

Physical characteristics
- Source: Perșani Mountains
- Mouth: Olt
  - coordinates: 45.8308°N 25.5766°E
- Length: 22 km (14 mi)
- Basin size: 46 km^{2} (18 sq mi)

Basin features
- Progression: Olt→ Danube→ Black Sea
- Tributaries
  - left: Hotaru

The Crizbav is a left tributary of the river Olt in Romania. It discharges into the Olt in Colonia Reconstrucția. Its length is 22 km (14 mi) and its basin size is 46 km^{2} (18 sq mi).
