= Dacian fortress of Crizbav =

- Location within Romania
- 45.8185°N 25.4388°E
- Location: La cetate, Crizbav, Brașov, Romania

Site notes
- Condition: Ruined

Monument istoric
- Reference no.: BV-I-s-A-11273

It was a Dacian fortified town.
