= Vulcan, Brașov =

Vulcan
- Commune
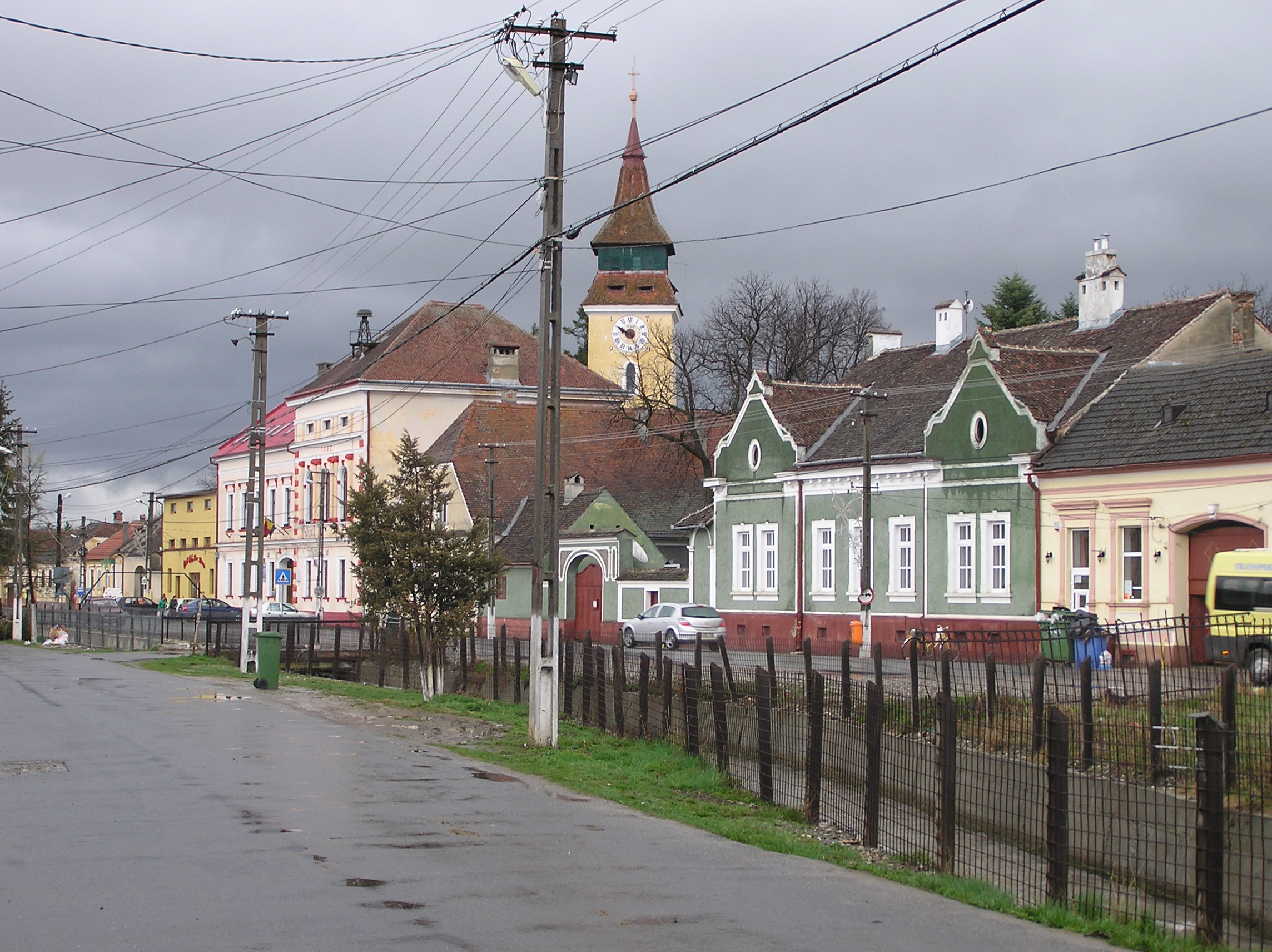
- Main street of Vulcan with the fortified church in the background

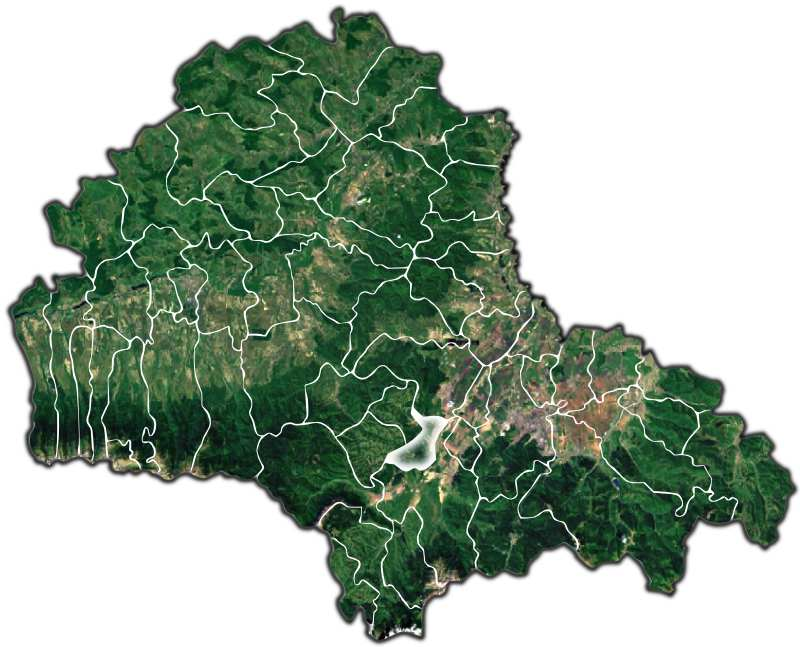
- Location in Brașov County

- Location in Romania
- Coordinates: 45°38′07″N 25°25′02″E
- Country: Romania
- County: Brașov

Government
  - Mayor (2020–2024): Marius-Adrian Doda (PSD)
- Area: 42.37 km^{2} (16.36 sq mi)
- Elevation: 606 m (1,988 ft)
- Population (2021-12-01): 4,823
  - Density: 113.8/km^{2} (294.8/sq mi)
- Time zone: UTC+02:00 (EET)
  - Summer (DST): UTC+03:00 (EEST)
- Postal code: 507270
- Area code: (+40) 02 68
- Vehicle reg.: BV
- Website: primaria-vulcan.ro

Vulcan (German: Wolkendorf; Hungarian: Szászvolkány) is a commune in Brașov County, Transylvania, Romania. It is composed of two villages, Colonia 1 Mai (Konkordiabányatelep) and Vulcan. It also included Holbav village until 2004, when it was split off to form a separate commune.

The commune is situated in the foothills of the Southern Carpathians, at an altitude of 606 m (1,988 ft), on the banks of the river Vulcănița. It is located in the south-central part of Brașov County, 16 km (9.9 mi) west of the county seat, Brașov. Since its founding around the year 1377, Vulcan was one of the most important villages in the Burzenland area, where there was a strong Transylvanian Saxon community.

Historical population
Year	Pop.	±%
1850	1,291	—
1941	2,781	+115.4%
1977	4,455	+60.2%
2002	4,264	−4.3%
2011	4,567	+7.1%
2021	4,823	+5.6%
Source: Census data

At the 2021 census, Vulcan had a population of 4,823; of those, 80% were Romanians and 8.1% Roma.
