= Dumitru Stăniloae =

Romanian Orthodox saint (1903–1993)

Saint Dumitru Stăniloae
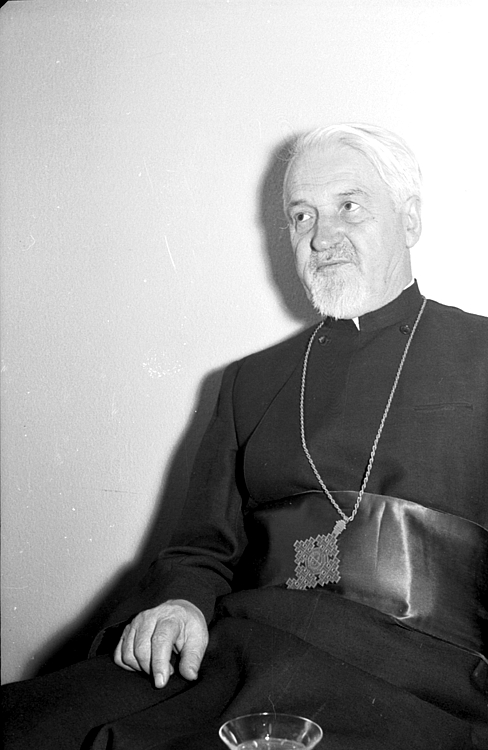
- Stăniloae in 1968

Holy Confessor, Priest
- Born: 29 November 1903; Vlădeni, Dumbrăvița, Brașov, Austria-Hungary
- Died: 4 October 1993 (aged 89); Bucharest, Romania
- Resting place: Cernica Monastery
- Venerated in: Eastern Orthodox Church
- Canonized: 4 February 2025, Patriarchal Cathedral, Romania by Holy Synod of the Romanian Orthodox Church
- Feast: 4 October

Dumitru Stăniloae (Romanian: [duˈmitru stəniˈlo̯aje]; 29 November [O.S. 16 November] 1903 – 4 October 1993), also Anglicized as Demetrius Staniloae, was a Romanian Orthodox Christian priest, theologian and professor. He worked for over 45 years on a comprehensive Romanian translation of the Greek Philokalia, together with the hieromonk Arsenius Boca, who brought manuscripts from Mount Athos. His book, The Dogmatic Orthodox Theology (1978), made him one of the best-known Christian theologians of the second half of the 20th century. He also produced commentaries on earlier Christian thinkers, such as Gregory of Nyssa, Maximus the Confessor, and Athanasius of Alexandria. On 4 February 2025, he was canonized as a saint by the Romanian Orthodox Church, but he is highly venerated throughout the Eastern Orthodox communion for his theological works and impact on the collective faith of the Church.

He is a controversial figure outside the Orthodox Church, primarily due to his early activity as a journalist when he promoted antisemitism and praised totalitarian figures such as Ion Antonescu and Adolf Hitler, before and during World War II, and his continued nationalistic and ultraconservative positions in his later years. He was recruited by the Securitate under the codename "Văleanu Ion" as an informant following his release from prison in 1963 but he did not cooperate. Accused of being a "mystical element with hostile concepts", he would be removed from the network of informants in 1973.

== Biography ==
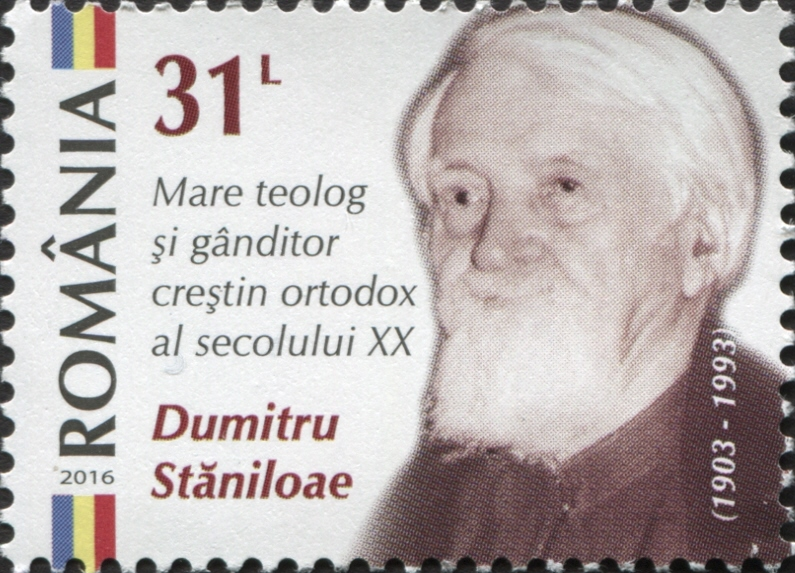
Stăniloae on a 2016 Romanian stamp

Dumitru Stăniloae was born on 16 November 1903, in Vlădeni, in what is now Brașov County, Romania. He was the last of five children of Rebeca (mother) and Irimie (father). His mother was a priest's niece. On 10 February 1917 he went to Brașov to study at the Andrew Șaguna High School. He received a fellowship from the Gojdu Foundation in 1918 and a fellowship from the University of Cernăuți in 1922. Disappointed by the quality of the manuals and the teaching methods, he left for the University of Bucharest after one year. He was offered a fellowship by metropolitan bishop Nicolae Bălan at the Metropolitan Center in Sibiu in 1924 during Lent. Stăniloae graduated from the University of Cernăuți in 1927, receiving a fellowship to study theology in Athens. In the fall of 1928 he earned his PhD degree at Cernăuți, with thesis Life and work of Dositheos II of Jerusalem (1641-1707) and his connections with the Romanian Principalities. The Metropolitan Center in Sibiu offered him a fellowship in Byzantine studies and Dogmatics. He went to Munich to attend the courses of German Byzantinist August Heisenberg (father of physicist Werner Heisenberg), and then went to Berlin, Paris, and Istanbul to study the work of Gregory Palamas.

He married on 4 October 1930, and his wife gave birth to twins in 1931, named Demetrius and Maria. He and his wife had another daughter, Lidia, on 8 October of the following year; and that year he met and befriended ultra-right ideologist Nichifor Crainic.

In January 1934, Stăniloae took over as editor in chief of the Transylvanian bi-weekly church newspaper Telegraful român (The Romanian Telegraph). He would hold the position until May 1945. Under the previous editor in chief, George Proca, Telegraful român had published ambivalent articles about the Jewish minority. Under Stăniloae, the editorial line became aggressively antisemitic, promoting the theory of Jewish Bolshevism. It published eulogies of legionaries Ion Moța and Vasile Marin, far-right politician A. C. Cuza, Romanian dictator Ion Antonescu and even Adolf Hitler. As antisemitic legislation was adopted by the successive Romanian governments, Telegraful supported the legislation. Deportations of Roma and Jews were also encouraged. Some editorials (including a 1942 article suggestively titled Au să dispară din Europa, i.e., They will disappear from Europe) go as far as advocating the Final Solution:

"The newspaper Raza from Bessarabia prints the joyful news that the last Jewish convoy from Chișinău is heading towards the Russian steppe, and thus the city got rid of the Jewish cancer. According to the aforementioned newspaper, the departure of the Jews took place with the same swiftness in the other cities of Bessarabia. So it should be – in Bessarabia and all the other provinces of the country."

Under Stăniloae's leadership, the newspaper also promoted anti-Catholicism and anti-Protestantism.

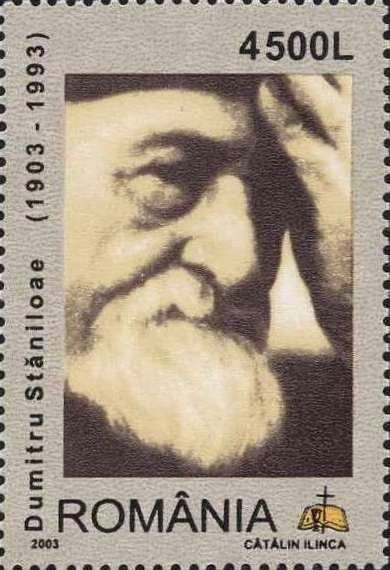
Stamp featuring Stăniloae

As a result of his political writing and his notability, a generation of theologians, associated with him or sharing his political views - in particular antisemitism, is known as "Stăniloae Generation".

Stăniloae was ordained a deacon on 8 October 1931 and was ordained priest on 25 September 1932. In June 1936 he became rector of the Theological Academy in Sibiu. In 1940, at the initiative of poet Sandu Tudor, the Rugul aprins (Burning Bush) group was founded. It was composed of priest-monk Ioan Kulîghin (in Russian: Ivan Kulygin; confessor of Russian Metropolitan bishop of Rostov, refugee at Cernica Monastery), priest-monk Benedict Ghius, priest-monk Sofian Boghiu, Prof. Alex. Mironescu, poet Vasile Voiculescu, architect Constantin Joja, Father Andrei Scrima and Ion Marin Sadoveanu. The group gathered regularly at the Cernica and Antim monasteries, maintaining Christian life in Bucharest.

In 1946 he was asked by metropolitan bishop Nicholas Bălan, under pressure from Petru Groza, first Communist Prime Minister of Romania, to resign as rector of the Theological Academy in Sibiu. He remained a professor until 1947, when he was transferred to the University of Bucharest's Faculty of Theology, as the Ascetics and Mystics chair.

Because of political unrest in Romania in 1958, following a split in the Romanian Communist Party, Father Demetrius was arrested by the Securitate on 5 September. While he was in Aiud Prison as a political prisoner, his only surviving child, Lidia, gave birth to his grandchild, Demetrius Horia. Lidia was asked to leave the University of Bucharest's Faculty of Physics because of the arrest of her father.

He was freed from prison in January 1963, and then began work as a clerk at the Holy Synod of the Romanian Orthodox Church, and began teaching again in October. He attended conferences in Freiburg and Heidelberg at the invitation of Prof. Paul Miron, with the permission of the State Department of Cults, who wanted to change the image of Romania. While lecturing at Oxford University, he became friends with the theologian Donald Allchin. He retired in 1973.

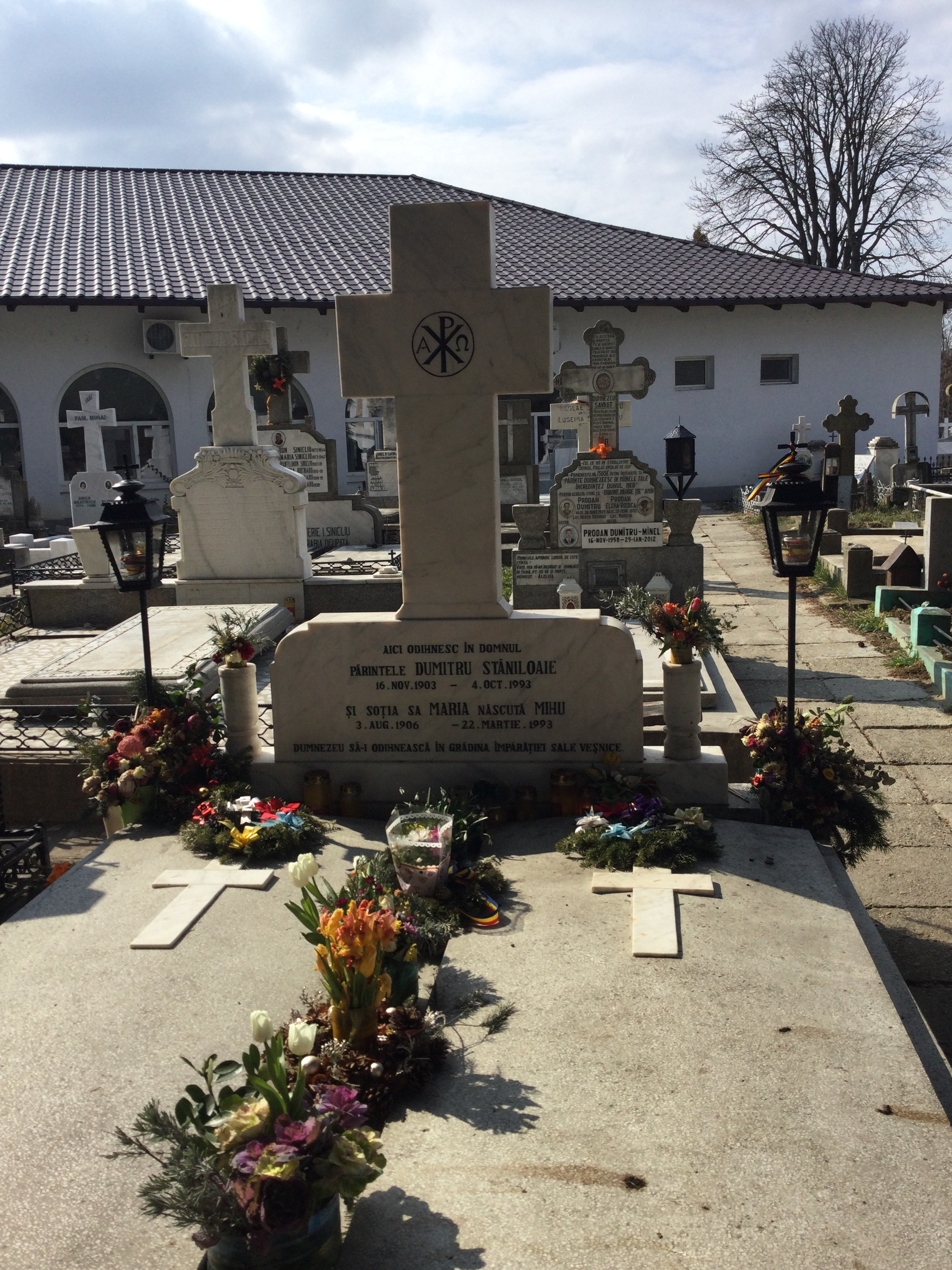
Grave at Cernica Monastery

He received honorary doctorates from the University of Thessaloniki in 1976, St. Sergius Institute of Orthodox Theology in Paris in 1981, the Faculty of Orthodox Theology in Belgrade in 1982, and the University of Bucharest in 1992. He was awarded the Dr. Leopold Lucas prize of the Faculty of Theology in Tübingen in 1980 and the Cross of St Augustine in Canterbury in 1982.

He died in Bucharest on 4 October 1993, aged 89.

=== Canonization ===
Father Dumitru Stăniloae was canonised in 2025 as the Romanian Orthodox Church celebrates 140 years of autocephaly and 100 years since obtaining the status of a patriarchate. On 11 and 12 July 2024, the Romanian Orthodox Church officially approved the canonization of Stăniloae along with 15 other Romanian Orthodox saints. His feast day is on 4 October.

His canonization, along with Ilarion Felea's and Ilie Lăcătuşu's, was criticised by Elie Wiesel National Institute for Studying the Holocaust in Romania:

"We question whether elevating to sainthood individuals who, during their lives, shared the values of fascism through words or deeds is consonant with Christian ethics"

The Romanian Orthodox Church promptly replied to criticism, supporting the decision:

"Some saints venerated in the Orthodox Church have had, at certain times in their lives, attitudes, and gestures that are hard to understand or even contrary to Christian teachings. However, the Church considers the sinner's change of life and, especially, how they ended their lives, without encouraging (sanctifying) certain deviations that these persons may have had during their lives."

== Reception ==
Dumitru Stăniloae is widely recognised as one of the most prolific theologians in Romanian history.

In 2012 research on the theology of Stăniloae, Mihail Neamțu takes a position similar to that of his former professor Andrew Louth, writing that "Stăniloae's apologetics was shaped by confessional bias and rhetorical clichés", including "the reduction of Roman Catholic spirituality to mere legalism". Neamțu notes Stăniloae's lasting heritage not as nationalism, but his "truly inspired" exegetical work on Scripture and the Church Fathers.

== See also ==
- Lucian Turcescu
- Vladimir Lossky

== Works ==
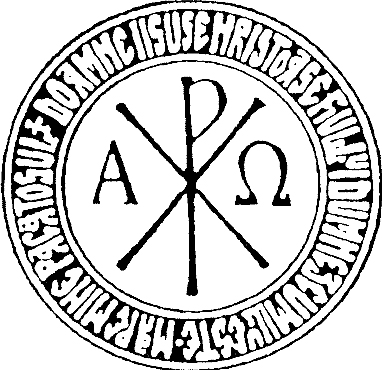
Christogram with Jesus Prayer in Romanian: Lord Jesus Christ, Son of God, have mercy on me, the sinner. The image appears on Romanian Philokalia book cover.

- Catholicism after the War, Sibiu, 1932
- Life and teachings of Gregory Palamas, Sibiu, 1938
- Orthodoxy and Romanianism, Sibiu, 1939
- The standing of Mr. Lucian Blaga on Christianity and Orthodoxism, Sibiu, 1942
- Jesus Christ or man's restoration, Sibiu, 1943
- Philokalia (translation); vol. 1: Sibiu, 1946; vol. 2: Sibiu, 1947; vol. 3: Sibiu, 1948; vol. 4: Sibiu, 1948; vol. 5: Bucharest, 1976; vol. 6: Bucharest, 1977; vol. 7: Bucharest, 1978; vol. 8: Bucharest, 1979; vol. 9: Bucharest, 1980.
- Uniatism in Transylvania, an attempt to dismember the Romanian people, Bucharest, 1973
- Treaty of Orthodox Dogmatic Theology, Bucharest, 1978
- Dieu est Amour, Geneva, 1980
- Theology and the Church, New York City, 1980
- Praying, freedom, holiness, Athens, 1980
- Prière de Jésus et experience de Saint Esprit, Desclée de Brouwer, Paris, 1981 (ISBN 2220023206, OCLC 300381429)
- Orthodox Spirituality, Bucharest, 1981
- Moral Orthodox Theology, vol. 2, Bucharest, 1981
- St. Gregory of Nyssa – Writings (translation), Bucharest, 1982
- Orthodoxe Dogmatik, 1985
- Le genie de l'orthodoxie, Paris, 1985
- Spirituality a communion in Orthodox lithurgy, Craiova, 1986.
- God's eternal face, Craiova, 1987
- St. Athanasius the Great – Writings (translation), Bucharest, 1987
- Orthodox Dogmatic Theology Studies (Christology of St. Maximus the Confessor, Man and God, St. Symeon The New Theologian, Hymns of God's love), Craiova, 1991
- St. Cyril of Alexandria – Writings (translation), Bucharest, 1991

In English Translation:

- The Victory of the Cross: A Talk on Suffering, Fairacres Publications, Oxford, 1970 (ISBN 978-0728300491)
- Theology and the Church, SVS Press, Crestwood, 1980 (ISBN 978-0913836699)
- Liturgy of the Community and the Liturgy of the Heart: From the Viewpoint of the Philokalia, Fairacres Publications, Oxford, 1980 (ISBN 978-0948108037)
- Prayer and Holiness: The Icon of God Renewed in Man, Fairacres Publications, Oxford, 1982 (ISBN 978-0728300934)
- Eternity and Time, Fairacres Publications, Oxford, 2001 (ISBN 978-0728301535)
- Orthodox Spirituality: A Practical Guide for the Faithful and a Definitive Manual for the Scholar, STS Press, South Canaan, 2002 (translation of Orthodox Spirituality, Bucharest, 1981) (ISBN 978-1878997661)
- The Experience of God: Orthodox Dogmatic Theology. Holy Cross Orthodox Press
  - Vol. 1, Revelation and Knowledge of the Triune God (Brookline, 2005) (ISBN 978-0917651700).
  - Vol. 2, The World: Creation and Deification (Brookline, 2005) (ISBN 978-1885652416).
  - Vol. 3, The Person of Jesus Christ as God and Savior (Brookline, 2011) (ISBN 978-1935317180).
  - Vol. 4, The Church: Communion in the Holy Spirit (Brookline, 2012) (ISBN 978-1935317265).
  - Vol. 5, The Sanctifying Mysteries (Brookline, 2012) (ISBN 978-1935317296).
  - Vol. 6, The Fulfillment of Creation (Brookline, 2013) (ISBN 978-1-935317-34-0).
- The Holy Trinity: In the Beginning There Was Love, Holy Cross Orthodox Press (Brookline, 2012) (ISBN 978-1935317319)
