= Smaranda Brăescu =

Romanian skydiver (1897–1948)

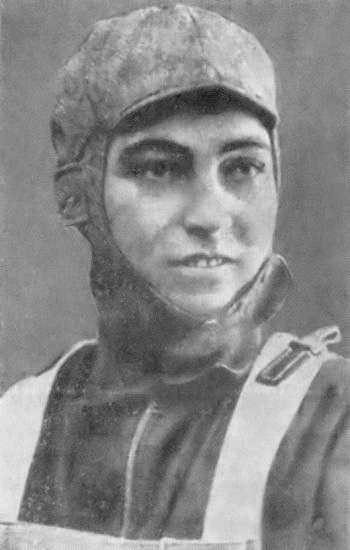
- Born: 21 May 1897; Hânțești, Buciumeni commune, Covurlui County (now Galați County), Kingdom of Romania
- Died: February 2, 1948 (aged 50); Cluj, Romanian People's Republic
- Known for: Early world records in parachuting

Smaranda Brăescu (21 May 1897 – 2 February 1948) was a Romanian parachuting and aviation pioneer, former multiple world record holder. Her achievements earned her the nickname "Queen of the Heights".

In the late 1920s and early 1930s she achieved several notable records, becoming the first Romanian woman to hold a parachuting license, the first European woman to be granted an American pilot license and the women's record holder for highest parachute jump. While visiting California in 1932 she broke the overall parachuting height record, jumping from around 7,000 metres (23,000 feet).

These feats made her a popular heroine both in Romania and abroad, a status that was further confirmed by her participation as part of a White Squadron medical wing in several battles of World War II. Opposition to the newly installed communist regime led to her being sent to prison in 1946, where she most likely died two years later.

== Biography ==
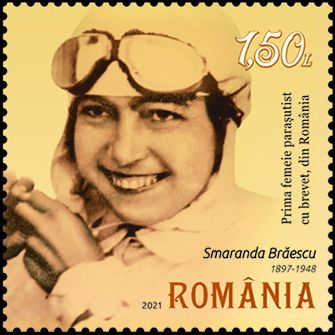
Brăescu on a 2021 stamp of Romania

=== Early life ===
She was born in the village of Hânțești, Buciumeni commune, in the present-day Galați County. After World War I she worked as a substitute teacher in her native village.

=== Career ===
In 1918, she flew for the first time in a Farman plane piloted by Captain Dumitru Naidinescu. In 1928, while in Germany, she bought a parachute, and jumped for the first time from a 6,000 metres (20,000 ft) height, becoming the first female Romanian parachutist.

She obtained her parachuting license on 5 July 1928, while traveling to Berlin, after a two days course and a jump without incidents. She became the first Romanian woman to ever obtain a parachuting license and one of the first women in the world to do so. This feat made Romania the third country in the world with a female parachutist.

In 1930, after a jump near Satu Mare, she was seriously injured and remained bedridden for six months. On 2 October 1931, Brăescu set the women's world record for highest parachute jump (from around 6,000 meters or 20,700 feet), landing in the Bărăgan Plain, Romania.

In 1932, in her Miles Hawk, she established the record crossing the Mediterranean Sea between Rome and Tripoli – 1,100 km (680 mi) in 6 hours and 10 minutes.

On 19 May 1932, she set the absolute world record for highest parachute jump, in Sacramento, California. It was homologated by the Aero Club of Washington. Sources disagree on the exact height of her jump, but it is usually given at somewhere around 7000 meters. From then on, she becomes a heroine, being escorted by 30 other planes to an air show in Canada, where she is invited. Later that year, Brăescu obtained her private pilot's license in the United States, becoming the first European woman to receive an American pilot's license.

She was in the White Squadron medical wing during battles on the Eastern Front in World War II, remaining active until 12 May 1945. She owned two biplanes.

=== Later life ===
After World War II, she signed a document condemning the November 1946 election, and was sentenced in absentia to prison. It is believed she died on 2 February 1948, and is possibly buried in the Central Cemetery in Cluj, under the name of Maria Popescu. Her grave is now marked in her name in Cluj.

== Legacy ==
A street in Bucharest and the 53rd Commando Battalion of the Special Operations Forces Command are named after her.
