= Maria Constantinescu (handballer) =

Romanian handball player (1934–2026)

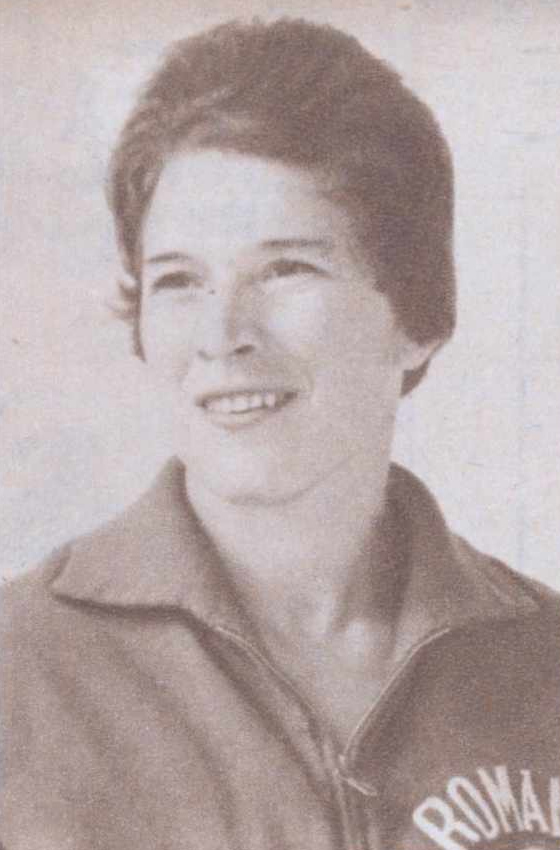

Personal information
- Nationality: Romanian
- Born: 21 September 1934 Hălchiu, Romania
- Died: 26 January 2026 (aged 91)

Sport
- Sport: Handball
- Position: Left wing

Senior clubs
- Years: Team
- –: Progresul Brașov
- –: Rapid București
- –: Progresul București
National team
- Years: Team
- –: Romania
Medal record
Field World Championship
Gold medal – first place	1956 West Germany
Gold medal – first place	1960 Netherlands
World Championship
Gold medal – first place	1962 Romania

Maria Constantinescu (née Scheip; 21 September 1934 – 26 January 2026) was a Romanian handballer who played for the Romanian national team. Constantinescu resided in Bucharest, where she regularly attended church. She died on 26 January 2026, at the age of 91.

== Trophies ==
=== Club ===
- Liga Națională:
  - Winner: 1961, 1963, 1967
- European Champions Cup:
  - Winner: 1964

=== National team ===
- Field World Championship:
  - Gold Medalist: 1956, 1960
- 7-players World Championship:
  - Gold Medalist: 1962
