= Buciumeni, Galați =

Buciumeni
- Commune
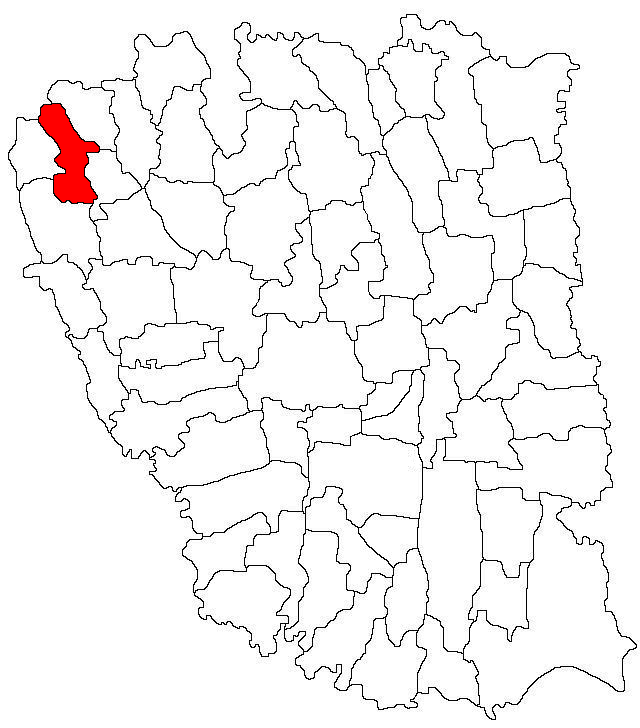
- Location in Galați County

- Location in Romania
- Coordinates: 46.002°N 27.305°E
- Country: Romania
- County: Galați

Government
  - Mayor (2020–2024): Petrache Năstasă (PSD)
- Area: 44.95 km^{2} (17.36 sq mi)
- Elevation: 200 m (660 ft)
- Population (2021-12-01): 2,156
  - Density: 47.96/km^{2} (124.2/sq mi)
- Time zone: UTC+02:00 (EET)
  - Summer (DST): UTC+03:00 (EEST)
- Postal code: 807060
- Area code: (+40) 0236
- Vehicle reg.: GL
- Website: www.primariabuciumeni.ro

Buciumeni is a commune in Galați County, Western Moldavia, Romania. It is composed of four villages: Buciumeni, Hănțești, Tecucelu Sec, and Vizurești.

Historical population
Year	Pop.	±%
2002	2,674	—
2011	2,326	−13.0%
2021	2,156	−7.3%
Source: Census data

At the 2021 census, the commune had a population of 2,156, of which 92.16% were Romanians.

== Natives ==
- Smaranda Brăescu (1897–1948), parachuting and aviation pioneer
