= Hălchiu =

- Commune
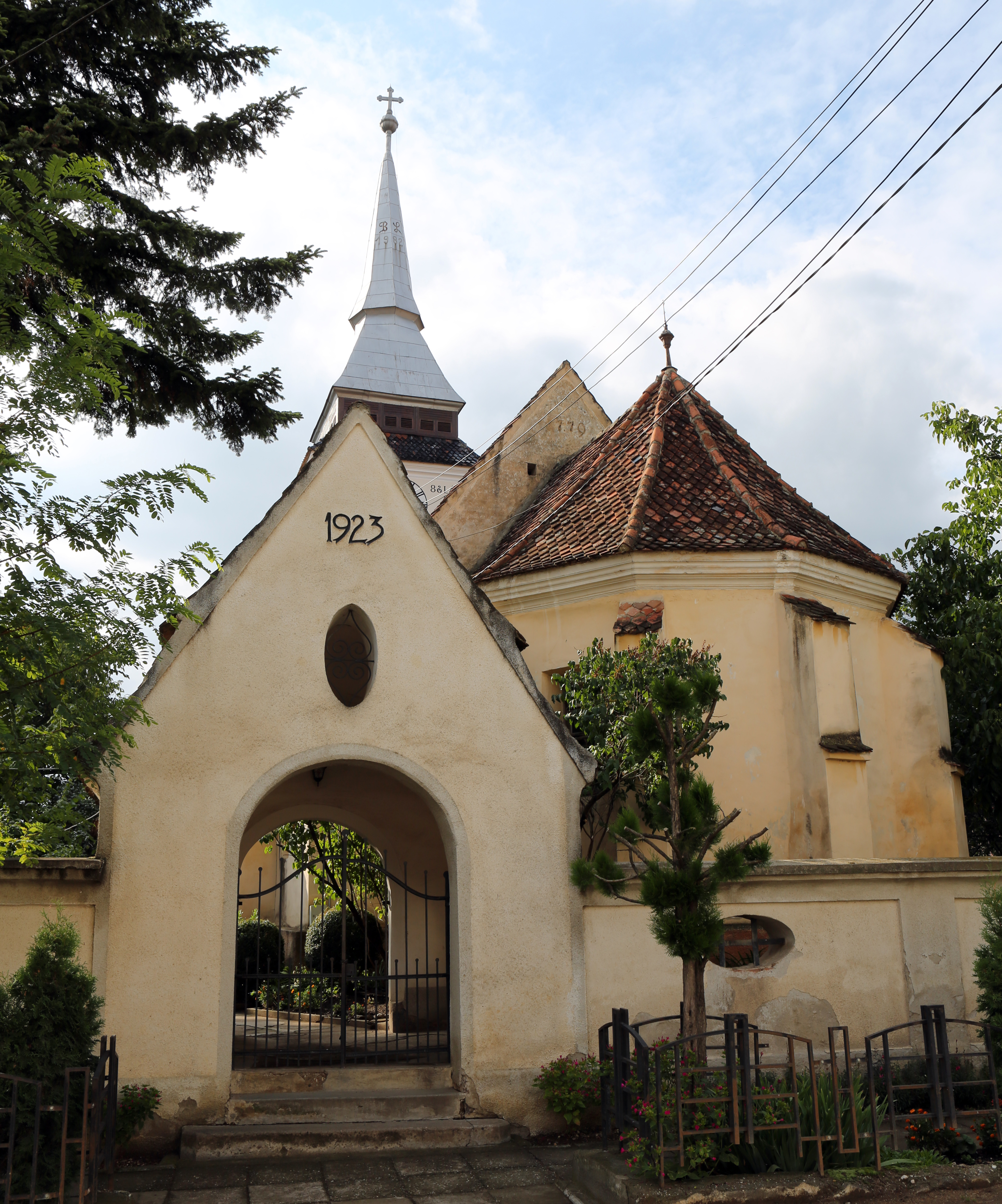
- Lutheran church in Satu Nou

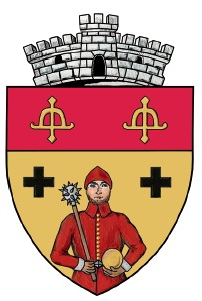
- Coat of arms

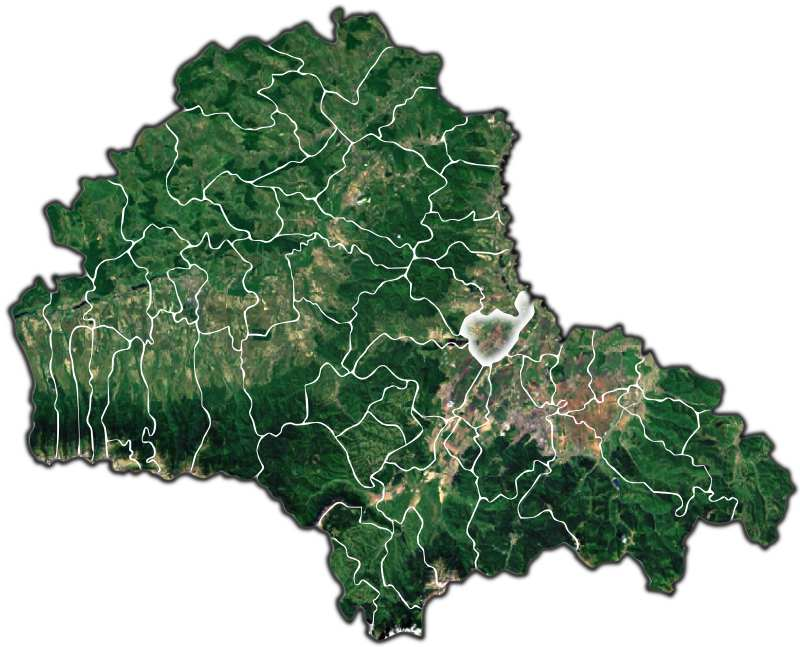
- Location within the county

- Location in Romania
- Coordinates: 45°46′N 25°33′E
- Country: Romania
- County: Brașov

Government
  - Mayor (2024–2028): Ioana Drugan (PNL)
- Area: 54.43 km^{2} (21.02 sq mi)
- Elevation: 505 m (1,657 ft)
- Population (2021-12-01): 4,560
  - Density: 83.8/km^{2} (217/sq mi)
- Time zone: UTC+02:00 (EET)
  - Summer (DST): UTC+03:00 (EEST)
- Postal code: 507080
- Area code: (+40) 02 68
- Vehicle reg.: BV
- Website: primariahalchiu.ro

Hălchiu (German: Heldsdorf; Hungarian: Höltövény) is a commune in Brașov County, Transylvania, Romania. It is composed of two villages, Hălchiu and Satu Nou (Neudorf bei Hopfenseifen; Barcaújfalu).

== Geography ==
The commune is located in the east-central part of the county, in the northern part of the Burzenland historical region. It lies 16 km (9.9 mi) north of the county seat, Brașov, and belongs to the Brașov metropolitan area.

To the west is Dumbrăvița Lake, with a surface area of 414 ha (1,020 acres). This is the only place in Transylvania and one of the few places in Romania where the grey heron nests in reeds.

Hălchiu is bordered to the north by Feldioara and Crizbav communes, to the east by Bod commune and the city of Brașov, to the south by the town of Ghimbav, and to the west by the city of Codlea and by Dumbrăvița commune.

== Demographics ==
Historical population
Year	Pop.	±%
1850	1,961	—
1920	2,786	+42.1%
1941	2,775	−0.4%
1966	3,440	+24.0%
1977	3,742	+8.8%
1992	2,752	−26.5%
2002	2,989	+8.6%
2011	4,218	+41.1%
2021	4,560	+8.1%
Source: Census data

At the 2011 census, the commune had 4,218 inhabitants; of those, 77.4% were Romanians, 16.4% Hungarians, 4.8% Roma, and 1.4% Germans (more specifically Transylvanian Saxons). At the 2021 census, Hălchiu had a population of 4,560, of which 78.25% were Romanians and 12.54% Hungarians.

== Natives ==
- Maria Constantinescu (1934 –2026), handball player

== Sights ==
- Hălchiu fortified church
- Satu Nou Lutheran church
- Satu Nou wooden church
