= Hărman =

- Commune
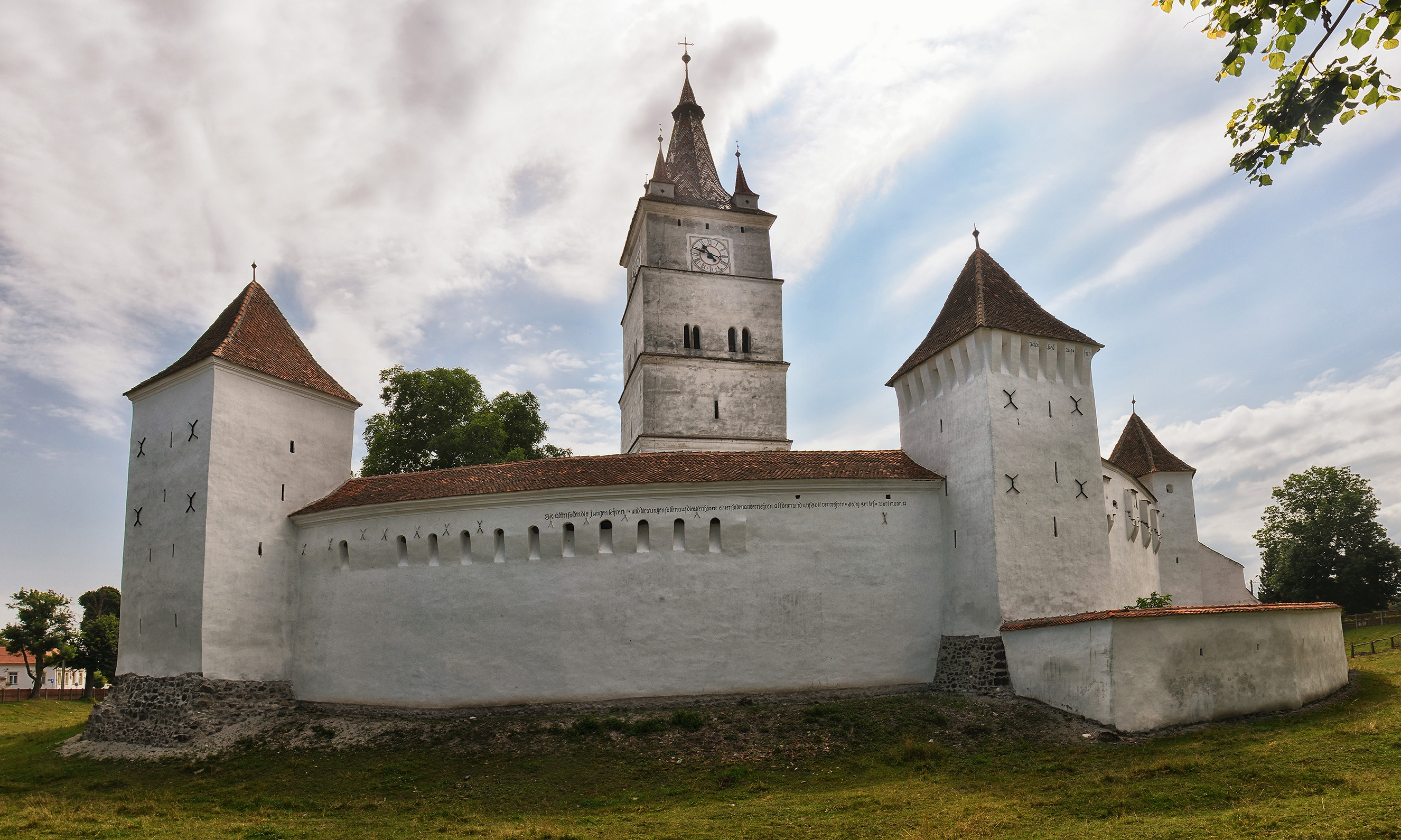
- Fortified church

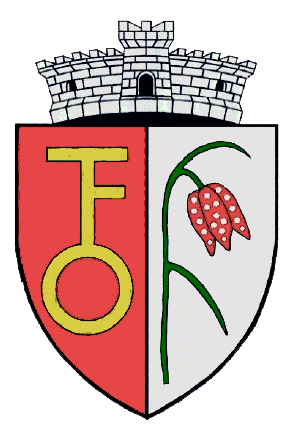
- Coat of arms

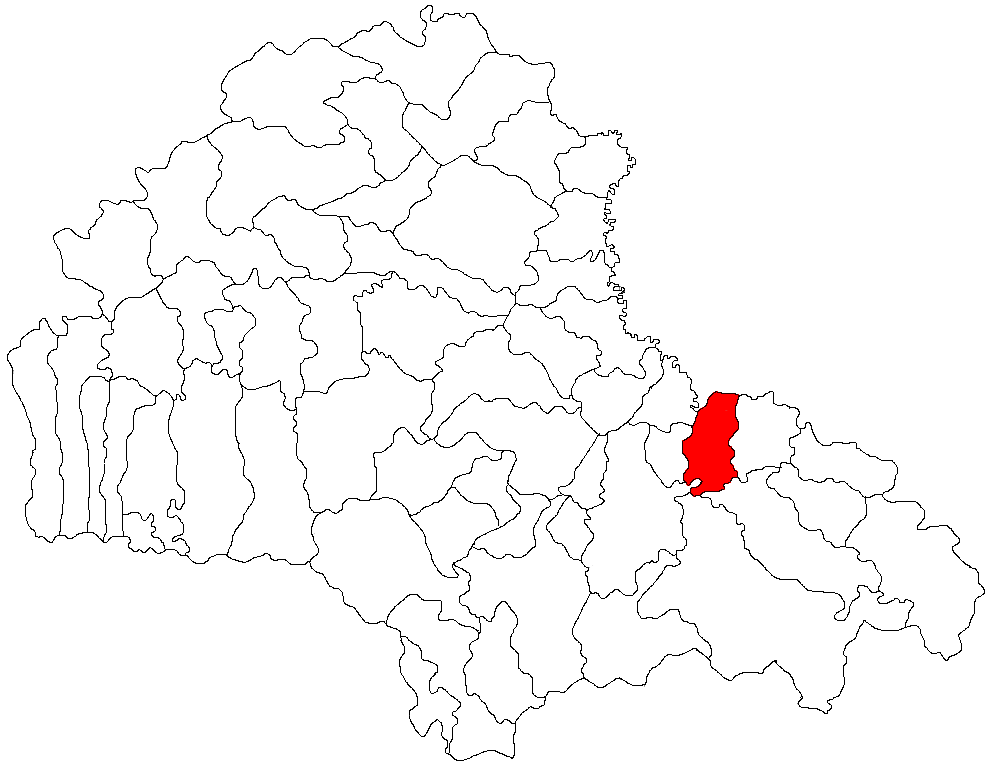
- Location within Brașov County

- Location in Romania
- Coordinates: 45°43′N 25°41′E
- Country: Romania
- County: Brașov

Government
  - Mayor (2024–2028): Onoriu Aurelian Velican (PNL)
- Area: 52.79 km^{2} (20.38 sq mi)
- Elevation: 530 m (1,740 ft)
- Population (2021-12-01): 7,154
  - Density: 135.5/km^{2} (351.0/sq mi)
- Time zone: UTC+02:00 (EET)
  - Summer (DST): UTC+03:00 (EEST)
- Postal code: 507085
- Area code: +(40) x59
- Vehicle reg.: BV
- Website: www.primariaharman.ro

Hărman (German: Honigberg; Zåksesch: Hooentschprich; Hungarian: Szászhermány) is a commune in Brașov County, Transylvania, Romania. It is composed of two villages, Hărman and Podu Oltului (Vámoshíd). The commune is located some 10 km (6.2 mi) east of Brașov, in the Burzenland region of southeastern Transylvania.

Hărman was established and long inhabited mainly by Transylvanian Saxons.

Historical population
Year	Pop.	±%
1850	2,031	—
1880	2,039	+0.4%
1910	2,339	+14.7%
1930	2,968	+26.9%
1941	2,962	−0.2%
1966	4,288	+44.8%
1977	5,778	+34.7%
1992	4,280	−25.9%
2002	4,425	+3.4%
2011	5,402	+22.1%
2021	7,154	+32.4%
Source: Census data

At the 2011 census, Hărman had 5,402 inhabitants; 90.6% were Romanians, 4.7% Roma, 2.3% Hungarians, and 1.2% Germans. At the 2021 census, the commune had a population of 7,154; of those, 81.93% were Romanians, 1.94% Hungarians, and 1.22% Roma.
