= Dumbrăvița, Brașov =

Dumbrăvița
- Commune
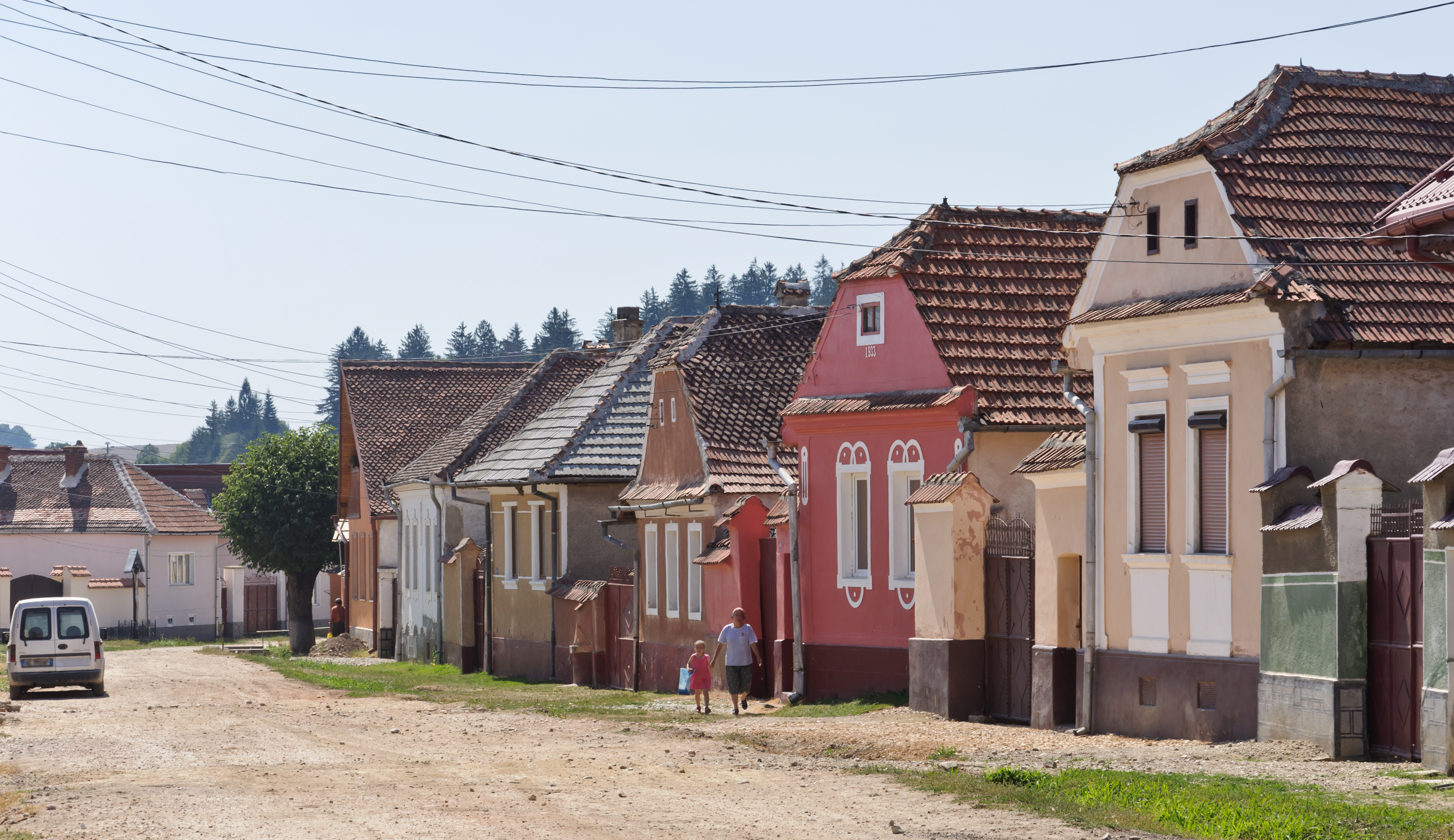

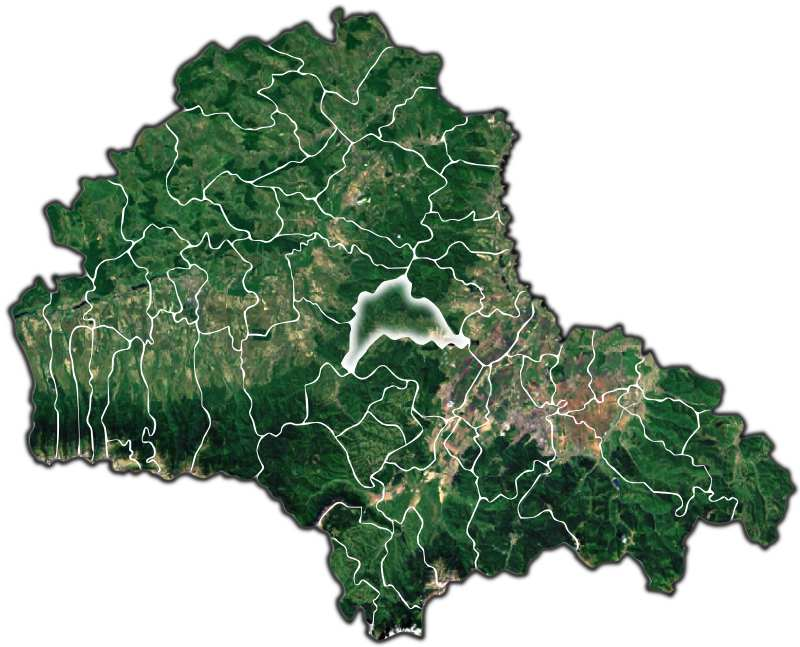
- Location within the county

- Location in Romania
- Coordinates: 45.7667°N 25.4333°E
- Country: Romania
- County: Brașov

Government
  - Mayor (2020–2024): Zachiu Popa (PNL)
- Area: 99.10 km^{2} (38.26 sq mi)
- Elevation: 530 m (1,740 ft)
- Population (2021-12-01): 4,633
  - Density: 46.75/km^{2} (121.1/sq mi)
- Time zone: UTC+02:00 (EET)
  - Summer (DST): UTC+03:00 (EEST)
- Postal code: 507060
- Area code: +(40) 268
- Vehicle reg.: BV
- Website: primariadumbravita.ro

Dumbrăvița (until 1960 Țânțari; German: Schnackendorf; Hungarian: Szunyogszék) is a commune in Brașov County, Transylvania, Romania. It is composed of two villages, Dumbrăvița and Vlădeni (Wladein; Vledény).

The commune is located in the central part of the county, 10 km (6.2 mi) north of Codlea and 24 km (15 mi) from the county seat, Brașov, in the western part of the Burzenland region. It is surrounded by the Perșani Mountains, with the Măgura Codlei Peak at 1,292 m (4,239 ft) to the south.

Just to the east is the Dumbrăvița Lake, with a surface area of 414 ha (1,020 acres). This is the only place in Transylvania and one of the few places in Romania where the grey heron nests in reeds.

Dumbrăvița is bordered to the north by Crizbav commune, to the east by Hălchiu commune, to the south by the city of Codlea, and to the west by the Șinca and Părău communes.

The village of Vlădeni is traversed by the national road DN1, which runs from Bucharest to the border with Hungary. Dumbrăvița has a train station that serves the CFR Line 200, which connects Brașov to Făgăraș, some 44 km (27 mi) to the west.

Historical population
Year	Pop.	±%
1850	2,964	—
1977	5,160	+74.1%
2002	4,542	−12.0%
2011	4,624	+1.8%
2021	4,633	+0.2%
Source: Census data

At the 2011 census, the commune had 4,624 inhabitants; of those, 92.86% were ethnic Romanians and 3.2% Roma. At the 2021 census, Dumbrăvița had a population of 4,633, of which 90.48% were Romanians.

== Natives ==
- Dumitru Stăniloae (1903 – 1993), priest, theologian, and professor
